= WKHR =

Radio station in Bainbridge, Ohio

- Bainbridge, Ohio; United States
- Broadcast area: Geauga County; Greater Cleveland (limited)
- Frequency: 91.5 MHz
- RDS: 1. WKHR-FM; 2. Clevelands only FM home of Swing, Sweet and Jive
- Branding: WKHR FM 91.5

Programming
- Format: Adult standards/MOR

Ownership
- Owner: Kenston Local School District

History
- First air date: May 1, 1977
- Former frequencies: 88.3 MHz (1977–95)
- Call sign meaning: Kenston High Radio

Technical information
- Licensing authority: FCC
- Facility ID: 34028
- Class: A
- ERP: 750 watts
- HAAT: 141 meters (463 ft)
- Transmitter coordinates: 41°27′49.00″N 81°17′38.00″W

Links
- Public license information: Public file; LMS
- Webcast: Listen live
- Website: wkhr.org

WKHR (91.5 FM) is a non-commercial educational radio station licensed to Bainbridge, Ohio, United States. Owned by the Kenston Local School District, the station broadcasts an adult standards/MOR format and serves Geauga County and eastern parts of Greater Cleveland. The WKHR studios are located at Kenston Middle School in Bainbridge Township, while the transmitter resides in Newbury Township. In addition to a standard analog transmission, WKHR streams online.

== History ==
WKHR first went on the air on May 1, 1977, broadcasting at 88.3 MHz. The station originated as a high school broadcast class under the direction of Marilyn Teague at Kenston High School on May 6, 1977. Initially, WKHR broadcast with only 10 watts of power and featured a rockformat; the station was managed by both students and staff. By 1983, the station's power increased to 300 watts. In 1990, WKHR was reorganized under a nonprofit company, WKHR Radio, Inc. Over time, the station transitioned from a student-run alternative rock station to a big band station run by adult volunteers.

In May 1995, the station received permission from the FCC to increase its power to 1000 watts. The increased power along with an improved antenna in Newbury Township allowed WKHR to be heard for the first time throughout the eastern portion of Greater Cleveland. Due to this, WKHR moved from 88.3 MHz to 91.5 MHz to avoid interference with WBWC in Berea; the move was part of a two-way frequency swap with WSTB in Streetsboro.

== Current programming ==
WKHR broadcasts 24 hours a day, seven days a week; on air personalities include a mix of adult volunteers and students of Kenston High School. The station plays big band, swing, jazz and pop standards from the 1920s to the 1960s.
