= Chardon Local School District =

School district in Ohio

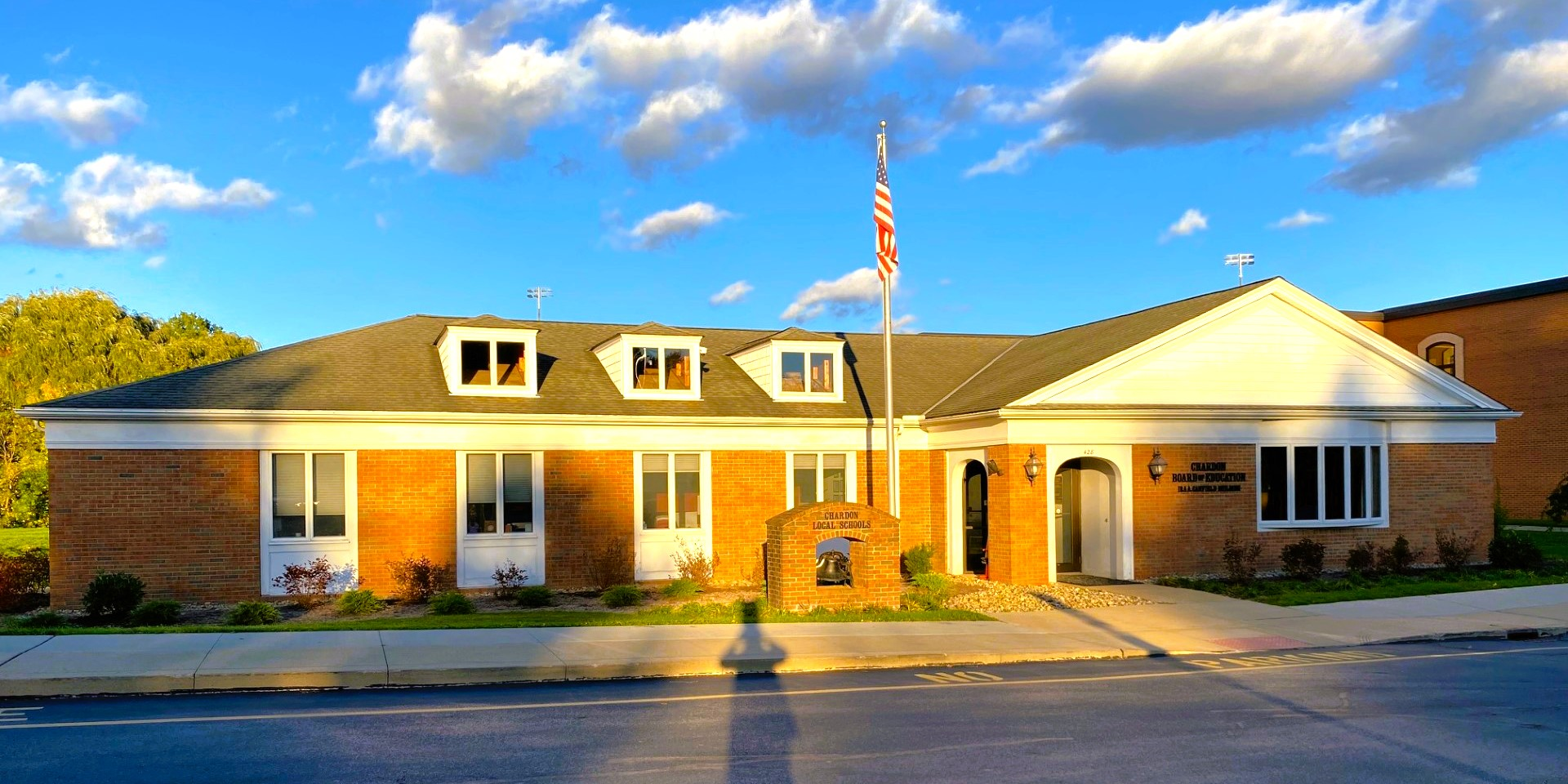

Address
- 428 North Street Chardon, Geauga, Ohio, 44024; United States
- Coordinates: 41°35′26″N 81°12′17″W

District information
- Type: Public
- Grades: PreK–12
- Superintendent: Michael P. Hanlon, Jr., Ph.D.
- NCES District ID: 3904718

Students and staff
- Enrollment: 2,457 (2024-25)
- Teachers: 125.37
- Student–teacher ratio: 19.60

Other information
- Website: www.chardon.k12.oh.us

The Chardon Local School District is a school district located in northern Geauga County, Ohio. The district serves students in grades Pre-K through twelve living in Chardon, Aquilla, Munson, Hambden, and small portions of Claridon and Concord townships. The district consists of one high school, one middle school and three elementary schools. All buildings and offices are located in Chardon.

== History ==
The Chardon Local School District was formed in 1957, after the merger of several township school systems.

Chardons original high school building was built in 1908. It was later demolished in 1984. Park Elementary school currently sits at its former site.

The current high school was built in 1938, originally as an elementary school, with later additions in the 50s, 60s and 70s. a levy was on the ballot for Chardon in 2019 to build a new $76 million new 6-12 building but was later rejected.

2012 Chardon High School Shooting

On February 27, 2012, six students were shot at the school by 17-year-old T.J. Lane. According to local news reports, the six victims were chosen at random, countering early reports that a group of students were targeted. Three of the victims died. All Chardon local schools were immediately closed following the shooting, while the high school was put under a lock-down procedure. The entire school district was closed on Tuesday, February 28. The district board also canceled classes in all schools until Friday, with numerous counseling services available until then. On March 19, 2013, Lane was given three life sentences, one for each of the victims killed in the shooting.

Hambden Elementary and Maple Elementary were both closed after the 2018-19 school year as part of a district wide cost-saving and modernization efforts. Students were consolidated into three elementary schools such as Park, Munson and Chardon Early Learning Center.

== District area ==
Most of the district is in Geauga County; the district includes the majorities of Chardon, Hambden, and Munson townships, as well as a portion of Claridon Township. It includes Chardon, Aquilla, and Bass Lake.

A piece of the district extends into Concord Township, Lake County.

== Schools ==
It operates the following schools:

Secondary schools

- Chardon High School
- Chardon Middle School

Elementary schools

- Chardon Early Learning Center
- Munson Elementary School
- Park Elementary School

Former schools

- Maple Elementary School
- Hambden Elementary School
