= Huntsburg, Ohio =

Unincorporated community in Ohio, U.S.

Coordinates: 41°32′05″N 81°03′06″W

Huntsburg is an unincorporated community in Huntsburg Township, Geauga County, in the U.S. state of Ohio.

== History ==
A post office called Huntsburgh was established in 1823, and the name was changed to Huntsburg in 1893. Huntsburg was named after Eben Hunt, the original owner of the town site.
