= Fullertown, Ohio =

Unincorporated community in Ohio, U.S.

Coordinates: 41°29′33″N 81°17′54″W

Fullertown is an unincorporated community in Geauga County, in the U.S. state of Ohio.

== History ==
A post office called Fullertown was established in 1879, and remained in operation until 1906. The community was named for Thomas Fuller, an early settler.

There are few remaining signs that Fullertown once existed as a village; plus, it is within the confines of Newbury Township, which is a shrinking community and has lost its school, grocery store, hardware store, and many other businesses in recent decades. As a result, most Fullertown residents favor Chesterland, which has a lot of what they need, and they avoid going to the center of Newbury Township altogether.
