= South Newbury =

South Newbury may refer to:

- South Newbury, New Hampshire, an unincorporated community
- South Newbury, Ohio, an unincorporated community
