= Ohio State Route 608 =

State highway in northeastern Ohio, US

State Route 608

Route information
- Maintained by ODOT
- Length: 19.47 mi (31.33 km)
- Existed: 1938–present

Major junctions
- South end: SR 528 / CR 6 in Middlefield
- US 322 in East Claridon; US 6 in Hambden
- North end: Ravenna Road (C-360) in Concord Township

Location
- Country: United States
- State: Ohio
- Counties: Geauga, Lake

Highway system
- Ohio State Highway System; Interstate; US; State; Scenic
← SR 607	→ SR 609

State Route 608 (SR 608) is a north–south state highway in the northeastern portion of the U.S. state of Ohio. Its southern terminus is at State Route 528 about 2 miles (3.2 km) south of Middlefield. The northern terminus is at Ravenna Road (Lake County Road 360, former State Route 44) about 4 miles (6.4 km) south of Painesville. The route passes through one of the largest Amish settlements in Ohio; an Amish-run cheese factory is located at Nauvoo Road north of Middlefield.

== Route description ==
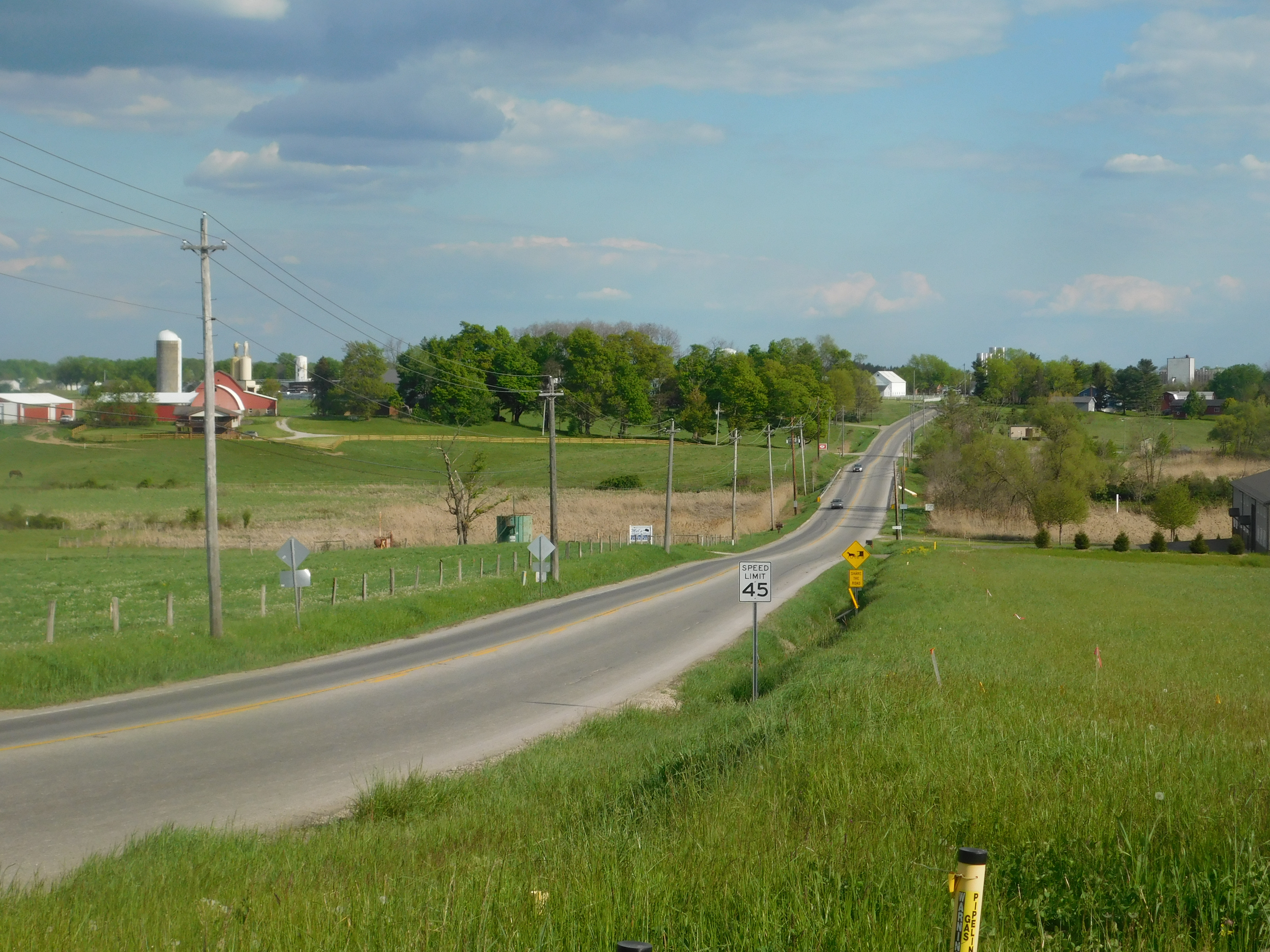
SR 608 southbound in Middlefield

== History ==
SR 608 follows part of the Old State Road, which was constructed in 1805 between Painesville and Warren. SR 608 was original commissioned in 1938, between SR 87 and its current northern terminus. The entire route was paved by 1949. The route was extended south to its current southern terminus, at SR 528, in 1965. In that same year SR 44 was rerouted westward, leaving the northern terminus of SR 608 disconnected from the state route system.

== Major intersections ==
County	Location	mi	km	Destinations	Notes
Geauga	Middlefield Township	0.00	0.00	SR 528 / CR 6 (Old State Road)	
Geauga	Middlefield	2.09	3.36	SR 87 (High Street)	
Geauga	Claridon Township	7.53	12.12	US 322 (Mayfield Road)	
Geauga	Hambden Township	12.84	20.66	US 6	
Lake	Concord Township	19.47	31.33	CR 360 (Ravenna Road) / CR 412 (Concord Hambden Road)	
1.000 mi = 1.609 km; 1.000 km = 0.621 mi
