= Claridon, Geauga County, Ohio =

- Unincorporated community
- Location within Ohio Location within the United States
- Coordinates: 41°32′19″N 81°07′44″W
- Country: United States
- State: Ohio
- County: Geauga
- Township: Claridon
- Elevation: 1,247 ft (380 m)
- Time zone: UTC-5 (Eastern (EST))
  - Summer (DST): UTC-4 (EDT)
- Area code: 440
- GNIS feature ID: 1060973

Claridon is an unincorporated community in Claridon Township, Geauga County, Ohio, United States. It is located on U.S. Route 322 southeast of Chardon and to the west of East Claridon.

== History ==
Claridon was originally to be named "Burlington", but since there was another Burlington in the state, the name was changed in order to avoid repetition. A post office called Claridon was established in 1819, and remained in operation until it was discontinued in 1906. The origin of the name Claridon is obscure.
