= South Thompson =

South Thompson may refer to:

- South Thompson, Ohio
- South Thompson River

== See also ==
- Kamloops-South Thompson
