= Montville Township, Ohio =

Montville Township, Ohio may refer to:

- Montville Township, Geauga County, Ohio
- Montville Township, Medina County, Ohio
