= South Russell, Ohio =

- Village
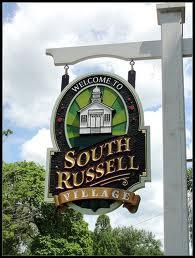
- Village limits sign

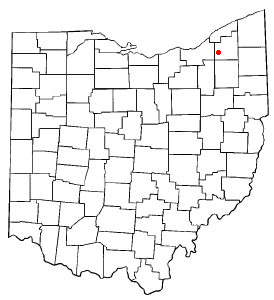
- Location of South Russell, Ohio

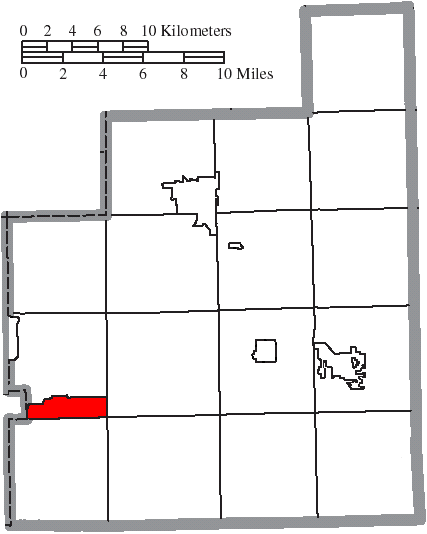
- Location of South Russell in Geauga County
- Coordinates: 41°25′54″N 81°20′07″W
- Country: United States
- State: Ohio
- County: Geauga

Area
  - Total: 3.86 sq mi (10.00 km^{2})
  - Land: 3.81 sq mi (9.86 km^{2})
  - Water: 0.054 sq mi (0.14 km^{2})
- Elevation: 1,201 ft (366 m)

Population (2020)
  - Total: 3,972
  - Density: 1,043.5/sq mi (402.89/km^{2})
- Time zone: UTC-5 (Eastern (EST))
  - Summer (DST): UTC-4 (EDT)
- FIPS code: 39-73684
- GNIS feature ID: 2399857
- Website: http://www.southrussell.com/

South Russell is a village in Geauga County, Ohio, United States. The population was 3,972 at the 2020 census. It is part of the Cleveland metropolitan area.

== History ==
South Russell was incorporated in 1923, the last village in Geauga County to have done so.

== Geography ==
According to the United States Census Bureau, the village has a total area of 3.83 square miles (9.92 km^{2}), of which 3.75 square miles (9.71 km^{2}) is land and 0.08 square miles (0.21 km^{2}) is water.

== Demographics ==
Historical population
| Census | Pop. | Note | %± |
|---|---|---|---|
| 1930 | 141 | | — |
| 1940 | 231 | | 63.8% |
| 1950 | 349 | | 51.1% |
| 1960 | 1,276 | | 265.6% |
| 1970 | 2,673 | | 109.5% |
| 1980 | 2,784 | | 4.2% |
| 1990 | 3,402 | | 22.2% |
| 2000 | 4,022 | | 18.2% |
| 2010 | 3,819 | | −5.0% |
| 2020 | 3,972 | | 4.0% |
U.S. Decennial Census

98.07% of the population speaks English as their primary language, and 1.93% speak French.

=== 2020 census ===
As of the 2020 census, South Russell had a population of 3,972. The median age was 45.0 years. 24.5% of residents were under the age of 18 and 19.8% of residents were 65 years of age or older. For every 100 females there were 93.6 males, and for every 100 females age 18 and over there were 94.2 males age 18 and over.

99.1% of residents lived in urban areas, while 0.9% lived in rural areas.

There were 1,413 households in South Russell, of which 37.4% had children under the age of 18 living in them. Of all households, 71.5% were married-couple households, 10.0% were households with a male householder and no spouse or partner present, and 16.2% were households with a female householder and no spouse or partner present. About 18.3% of all households were made up of individuals and 11.1% had someone living alone who was 65 years of age or older.

There were 1,477 housing units, of which 4.3% were vacant. The homeowner vacancy rate was 1.3% and the rental vacancy rate was 0.0%.

Racial composition as of the 2020 census
| Race | Number | Percent |
|---|---|---|
| White | 3,735 | 94.0% |
| Black or African American | 13 | 0.3% |
| American Indian and Alaska Native | 0 | 0.0% |
| Asian | 60 | 1.5% |
| Native Hawaiian and Other Pacific Islander | 3 | 0.1% |
| Some other race | 6 | 0.2% |
| Two or more races | 155 | 3.9% |
| Hispanic or Latino (of any race) | 82 | 2.1% |

=== 2010 census ===
As of the census of 2010, there were 3,819 people, 1,373 households, and 1,121 families living in the village. The population density was 1,016.0 inhabitants per square mile (392.3/km^{2}). There were 1,436 housing units at an average density of 382.9 per square mile (147.8/km^{2}). The racial makeup of the village was 97.5% White, 0.4% African American, 0.1% Native American, 1.2% Asian, 0.1% Pacific Islander, 0.1% from other races, and 0.7% from two or more races. Hispanic or Latino of any race were 0.8% of the population.

There were 1,373 households, of which 41.2% had children under the age of 18 living with them, 73.5% were married couples living together, 5.4% had a female householder with no husband present, 2.8% had a male householder with no wife present, and 18.4% were non-families. 16.5% of all households were made up of individuals, and 7.7% had someone living alone who was 65 years of age or older. The average household size was 2.77 and the average family size was 3.13.

The median age in the village was 44.9 years. 29.1% of residents were under the age of 18; 4.8% were between the ages of 18 and 24; 16.4% were from 25 to 44; 35.7% were from 45 to 64; and 14.1% were 65 years of age or older. The gender makeup of the village was 49.7% male and 50.3% female.

=== 2000 census ===
As of the census of 2000, there were 4,022 people, 1,364 households, and 1,159 families living in the village. The population density was 1,043.6 inhabitants per square mile (402.9/km^{2}). There were 1,401 housing units at an average density of 363.5 per square mile (140.3/km^{2}). The racial makeup of the village was 98.43% White, 0.35% African American, 0.80% Asian, and 0.42% from two or more races. Hispanic or Latino of any race were 0.72% of the population.

There were 1,364 households, out of which 47.0% had children under the age of 18 living with them, 77.6% were married couples living together, 5.1% had a female householder with no husband present, and 15.0% were non-families. 13.4% of all households were made up of individuals, and 6.6% had someone living alone who was 65 years of age or older. The average household size was 2.95 and the average family size was 3.26.

In the village, the population was spread out, with 32.8% under the age of 18, 3.8% from 18 to 24, 23.7% from 25 to 44, 28.8% from 45 to 64, and 10.9% who were 65 years of age or older. The median age was 40 years. For every 100 females there were 96.3 males. For every 100 females age 18 and over, there were 91.3 males.

The median income for a household in the village was $94,714, and the median income for a family was $103,174. Males had a median income of $84,783 versus $38,854 for females. The per capita income for the village was $41,091. None of the families and 0.6% of the population were living below the poverty line, including no under eighteens and none of those over 64.

== Education ==
South Russell is served by the Chagrin Falls Exempted Village School District.

== Notable person ==
- David Joyce – U.S. representative, former Geauga County Prosecutor
