= Bundysburg, Ohio =

Unincorporated community in Ohio, U.S.

Coordinates: 41°25′12″N 81°00′29″W

Bundysburg is an unincorporated community in Geauga County, in the U.S. state of Ohio.

== History ==
The first settlement at Bundysburg was made in 1815. The community was named for the local Bundy family. A post office was in operation in Bundysburg from 1830 until 1906.
