= Bass Lake, Ohio =

- Census-designated place
- Location within Ohio Location within the United States
- Coordinates: 41°33′20″N 81°13′32″W
- Country: United States
- State: Ohio
- County: Geauga
- Township: Munson

Area
  - Total: 1.03 sq mi (2.66 km^{2})
  - Land: 0.89 sq mi (2.31 km^{2})
  - Water: 0.14 sq mi (0.35 km^{2})
- Elevation: 1,158 ft (353 m)

Population (2020)
  - Total: 530
  - Density: 593.6/sq mi (229.18/km^{2})
- Time zone: UTC-5 (Eastern (EST))
  - Summer (DST): UTC-4 (EDT)
- ZIP Code: 44024 (Chardon)
- Area code: 440
- FIPS code: 39-04136
- GNIS feature ID: 2812820

Bass Lake is a census-designated place (CDP) in Geauga County, Ohio, United States, corresponding to the unincorporated community of West Bass Lake. The area was first listed as a CDP prior to the 2020 census. As of the 2020 census, Bass Lake had a population of 530.

The CDP is in the northwest part of Geauga County, in northeastern Munson Township. It is on the northwest side of Bass Lake, a natural lake on the Chagrin River, and extends up the valley side to the northwest as far as Wilson Mills Road at the top of the hill. It is 2 miles (3 km) southwest of Chardon, the Geauga county seat, and 27 miles (43 km) east of downtown Cleveland.

== Demographics ==
Historical population
Census	Pop.	Note	%±
2020	530		—
U.S. Decennial Census

== Education ==
It is in the Chardon Local School District.
