= Welshfield, Ohio =

- Unincorporated community
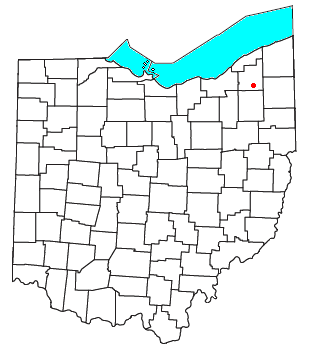
- Location of Welshfield, Ohio
- Coordinates: 41°23′13″N 81°8′32″W
- Country: United States
- State: Ohio
- County: Geauga
- Township: Troy
- Elevation: 1,234 ft (376 m)
- Time zone: UTC-5 (Eastern (EST))
  - Summer (DST): UTC-4 (EDT)
- GNIS feature ID: 1061727

Welshfield (also Troy, Troy Center, Troy Centre, or Wellsfield) is an unincorporated community in central Troy Township, Geauga County, Ohio, United States.

== History ==
Welshfield was named for Jacob Welsh, a pioneer settler. Jacob Welsh helped build a local church and school in exchange for the naming rights. The community once had a post office that was established on February 23, 1838. When it was discontinued on December 30, 1958, the Burton office began to handle mail for Welshfield addresses.

== Geography ==
It lies at the intersection of U.S. Route 422 and State Route 700, 1 mile (1.6 km) east of the Cuyahoga River and 3 miles (4.8 km) east of the LaDue Reservoir. Its elevation is 1,234 feet (376 m).
