= Hampden, Ohio =

Unincorporated community in Ohio, U.S.

Coordinates: 41°36′15″N 81°08′44″W

Hambden is an unincorporated community in Geauga County, in the U.S. state of Ohio.

== History ==
A post office called Hampden was established in 1826, and remained in operation until 1906. The community most likely was named after Hampden, Massachusetts.
