= Popes Corners, Ohio =

Unincorporated community in Ohio, U.S.

Coordinates: 41°23′13″N 81°10′19″W

Popes Corners is an unincorporated community in Geauga County, in the U.S. state of Ohio.

Popes Corners was named for D. L. Pope, the original owner of the site.
