= Mesopotamia Township, Trumbull County, Ohio =

Township in Ohio, US

- Civil township
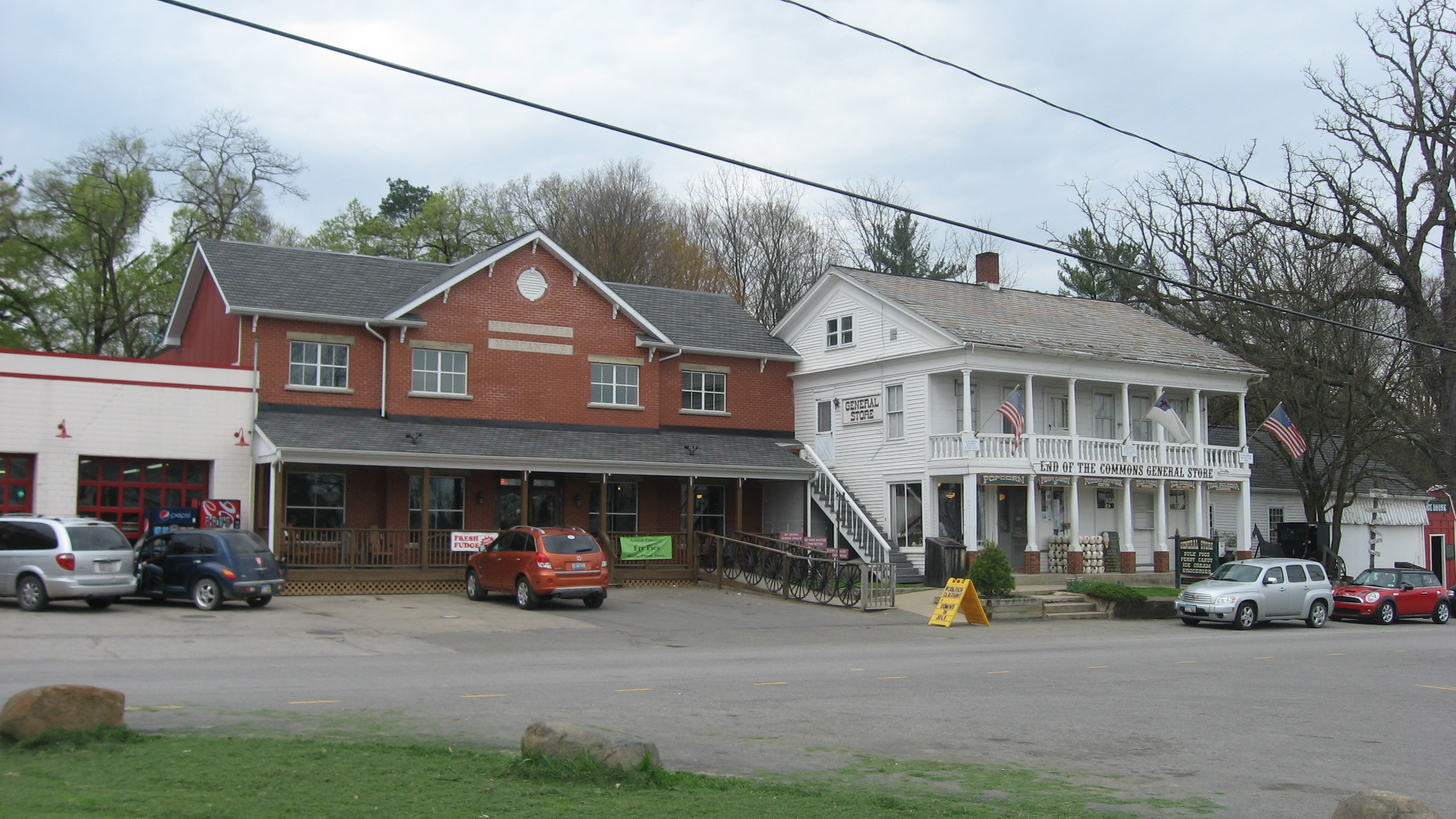
- Buildings on the village green at Mesopotamia Center

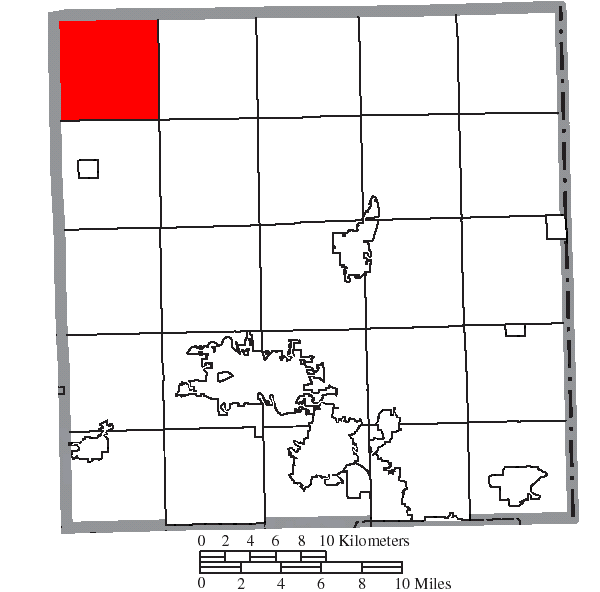
- Location of Mesopotamia Township in Trumbull County
- Coordinates: 41°27′46″N 80°56′43″W
- Country: United States
- State: Ohio
- County: Trumbull

Area
  - Total: 27.1 sq mi (70.1 km^{2})
  - Land: 27.1 sq mi (70.1 km^{2})
  - Water: 0 sq mi (0.0 km^{2})
- Elevation: 850 ft (259 m)

Population (2020)
  - Total: 3,404
  - Density: 126/sq mi (48.6/km^{2})
- Time zone: UTC-5 (Eastern (EST))
  - Summer (DST): UTC-4 (EDT)
- ZIP code: 44439
- Area code: 440
- FIPS code: 39-49210
- GNIS feature ID: 1087040

Historical population
Census	Pop.	Note	%±
1990	2,533		—
2000	3,051		20.5%
2010	3,387		11.0%
2020	3,404		0.5%
U.S. Census:

Mesopotamia Township is one of the twenty-four townships of Trumbull County, Ohio, United States. The 2020 census found 3,404 people in the township.

== Geography ==
Located in the northwestern corner of the county, it borders the following townships:

- Windsor Township, Ashtabula County - north
- Orwell Township, Ashtabula County - northeast corner
- Bloomfield Township - east
- Bristol Township - southeast corner
- Farmington Township - south
- Parkman Township, Geauga County - southwest corner
- Middlefield Township, Geauga County - west
- Huntsburg Township, Geauga County - northwest corner

No municipalities are located in Mesopotamia Township.

== Name and history ==
Named after the ancient region of Mesopotamia, it is the only Mesopotamia Township statewide.

== Notable people ==
- Leander F. Frisby, Wisconsin Attorney General, was born in the township.

== Government ==
The township is governed by a three-member board of trustees, who are elected in November of odd-numbered years to a four-year term beginning on the following January 1. Two are elected in the year after the presidential election and one is elected in the year before it. There is also an elected township fiscal officer, who serves a four-year term beginning on April 1 of the year after the election, which is held in November of the year before the presidential election. Vacancies in the fiscal officership or on the board of trustees are filled by the remaining trustees.
