= Fowlers Mill, Ohio =

Unincorporated community in Ohio, U.S.

Coordinates: 41°31′39″N 81°15′21″W

Fowlers Mill is an unincorporated community in Geauga County, in the U.S. state of Ohio.

== History ==
The namesake of the town, Fowler's Mills, was a gristmill built in 1831 by Hiram and Milo Fowler. A post office operated at Fowlers Mill from 1834 until 1906.
