= Bostwick, Ohio =

Unincorporated community in Ohio, U.S.

Coordinates: 41°39′03″N 81°04′59″W

Bostwick is an unincorporated community in Geauga County, in the U.S. state of Ohio.

== History ==
A post office called Bostwick was established in 1887, and remained in operation until 1905. A variant name was Bostwick Corners. The community was named for Shelburn Bostwick, a pioneer settler.
