= Russell Center, Ohio =

Unincorporated community in Ohio, U.S.

Coordinates: 41°27′45″N 81°20′26″W

Russell Center is an unincorporated community in Geauga County, in the U.S. state of Ohio. Russell Center is a synonym for Russell Township. Russell Center is not a Census designated place, nor does it have its own postal code. The postal codes for Russell Township include 44072 and 44022.

== History ==
A variant name was Russell. A post office called Russell was established in 1828, and remained in operation until 1881. Ebenezer Russell served as first postmaster.
