= Claridon Township, Geauga County, Ohio =

Township in Ohio, US

- Township
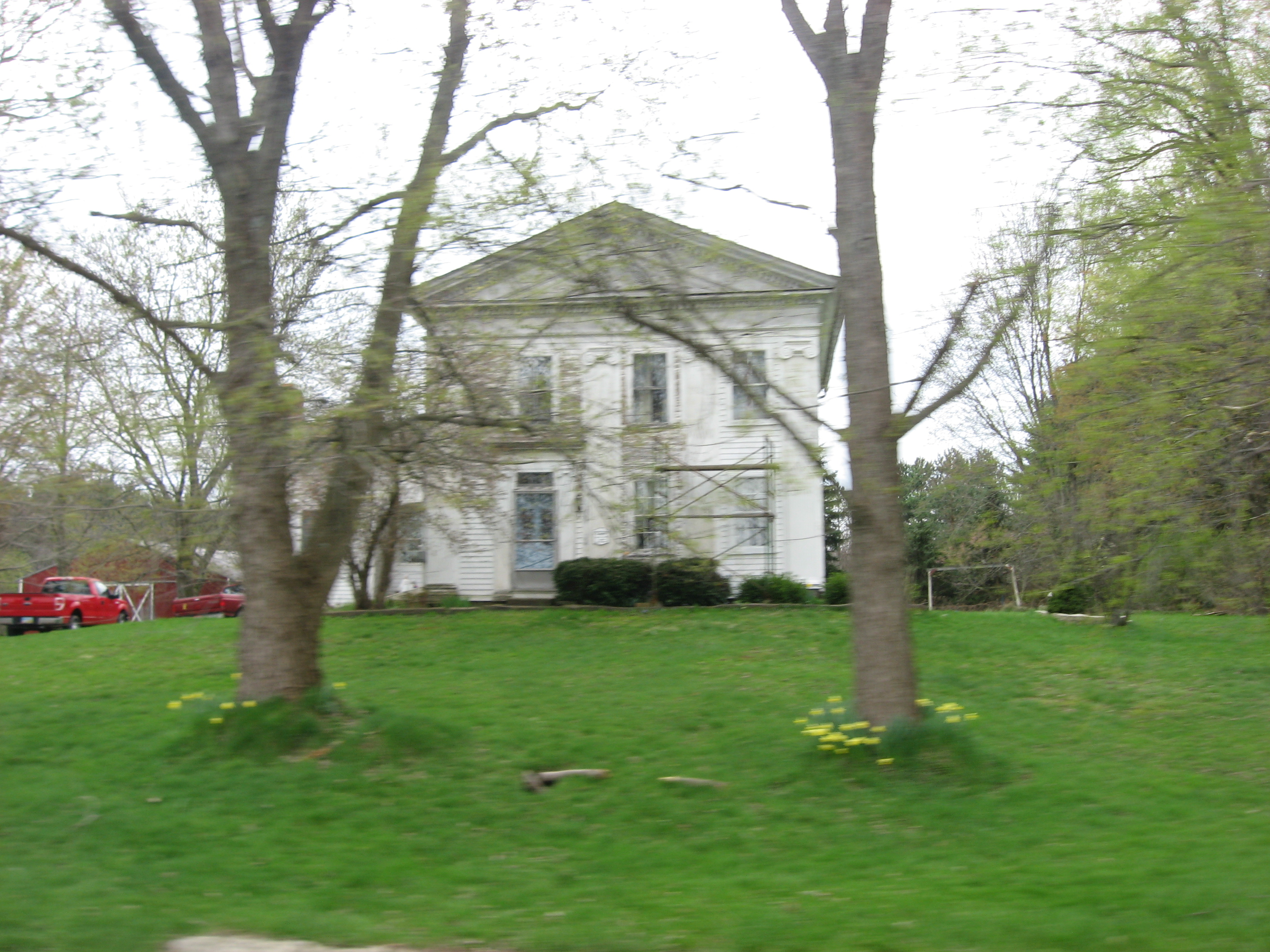
- The Lot Hathaway House, a historic site in the township
- Motto: "Land of Steady Habits"
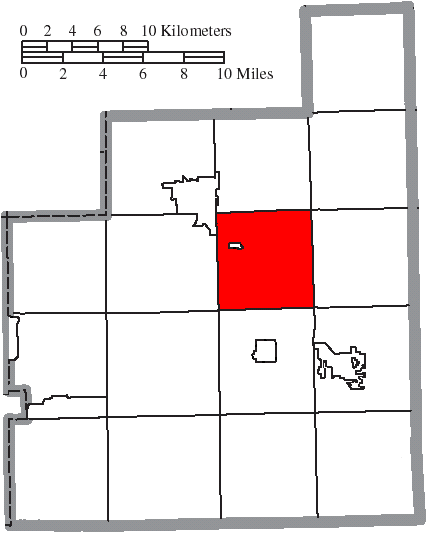
- Location of Claridon Township in Geauga County
- Coordinates: 41°32′8″N 81°9′8″W
- Country: United States
- State: Ohio
- County: Geauga

Area
  - Total: 22.6 sq mi (58.6 km^{2})
  - Land: 22.3 sq mi (57.8 km^{2})
  - Water: 0.35 sq mi (0.9 km^{2})
- Elevation: 1,250 ft (381 m)

Population (2020)
  - Total: 3,103
  - Density: 144/sq mi (55.5/km^{2})
- Time zone: UTC-5 (Eastern (EST))
  - Summer (DST): UTC-4 (EDT)
- FIPS code: 39-15168
- GNIS feature ID: 1086152
- Website: claridontownship.com

Claridon Township is one of the sixteen townships of Geauga County, Ohio, United States. As of the 2020 census the population was 3,103, of whom 2,865 lived in the unincorporated portions of the township.

== History ==
Claridon Township was settled in 1808 by Asa Cowles and Seth Spencer. Claridon was originally named "Canton" then "Burlington" when part of Burton Township. Early settlers relied heavily upon an agriculturally based economy, with included dairying, poultry and potato crops. Several cheese factories were built in the township, including the Hall Cheese Factory constructed in 1863. Other industries were blacksmith shops, carpentry shops, maple sugaring, and Nathaniel Spencer's chair factory (the oldest manufacturing business in the township, built in 1811). A railroad was constructed in 1872, with a line running through eastern and northern sections of Claridon. This aided in shipping butter, eggs, cheese and maple syrup to the other communities. One of the oldest roads in Geauga County, Old State Road (State Route 608), runs diagonally across the eastern part of Claridon. In 1932, the city of Akron started a reservoir project, seeking to supply the city with fresh water. Known as the East Branch Reservoir, it is on the East Branch of the Cuyahoga River and is situated partially within Claridon Township. Munson Township, once named "McDonough", was cut out of Claridon, but East Branch Reservoir remains. Claridon was split east and center due to religious differences, and the Methodist Church was moved as a result of those differences.

== Geography ==
Located in the north central part of the county, it borders the following townships:

- Hambden Township - north
- Montville Township - northeast corner
- Huntsburg Township - east
- Middlefield Township - southeast corner
- Burton Township - south
- Newbury Township - southwest corner
- Munson Township - west
- Chardon Township - northwest corner

The township covers a total area of 22.6 square miles (58.6 km^{2}), of which 22.3 square miles (57.8 km^{2}) is land and 0.3 square miles (0.9 km^{2}), or 1.53%, is water. The West and East branches of the Cuyahoga River flow through the township.

The unincorporated community of Aquilla is located in northwestern Claridon Township, and the unincorporated community of East Claridon lies in the eastern part of the township.

== Name ==
Statewide, the only other Claridon Township is located in Marion County.

== Government ==
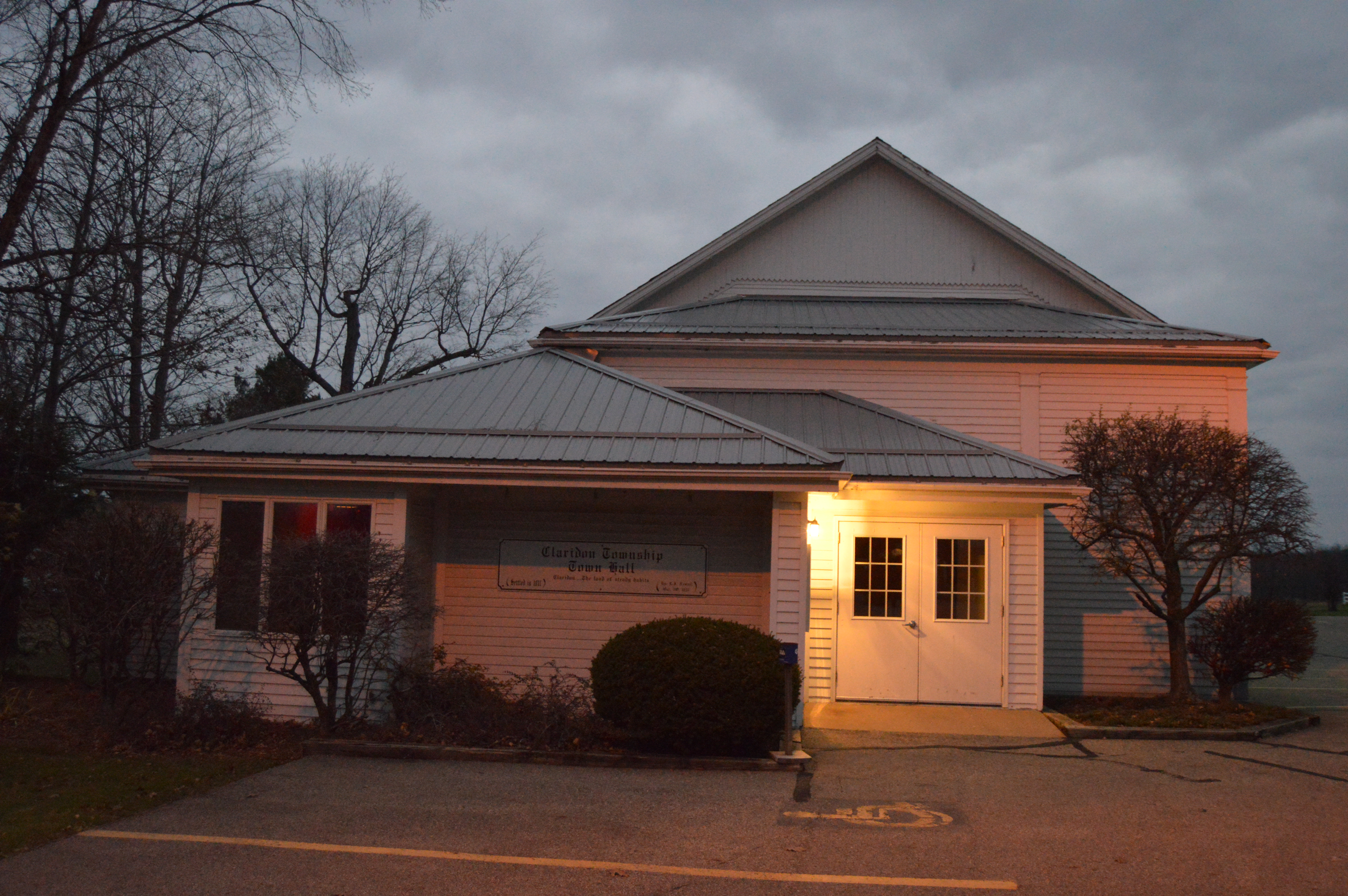
Township hall

The township is governed by a three-member board of trustees, who are elected in November of odd-numbered years to a four-year term beginning on the following January 1. Two are elected in the year after the presidential election and one is elected in the year before it. There is also an elected township fiscal officer, who serves a four-year term beginning on April 1 of the year after the election, which is held in November of the year before the presidential election. Vacancies in the fiscal officership or on the board of trustees are filled by the remaining trustees.

== Public services ==
=== Education ===
Students from the eastern two-thirds of the township attend schools in the Berkshire Local School District in Burton, while students from the western third of the township attend schools in the Chardon Local School District. Both school districts received excellent ratings in the 2006–2007 school year.

=== Parks ===
Parks in Claridon Township include Headwaters Park and the Maple Highlands Trail.

=== Transportation ===
Claridon Township is traversed by the following Ohio state and U.S. highways:

- - U.S. Route 322
- - State Route 608
