= Troy Township, Geauga County, Ohio =

Township in Ohio, US

- Township
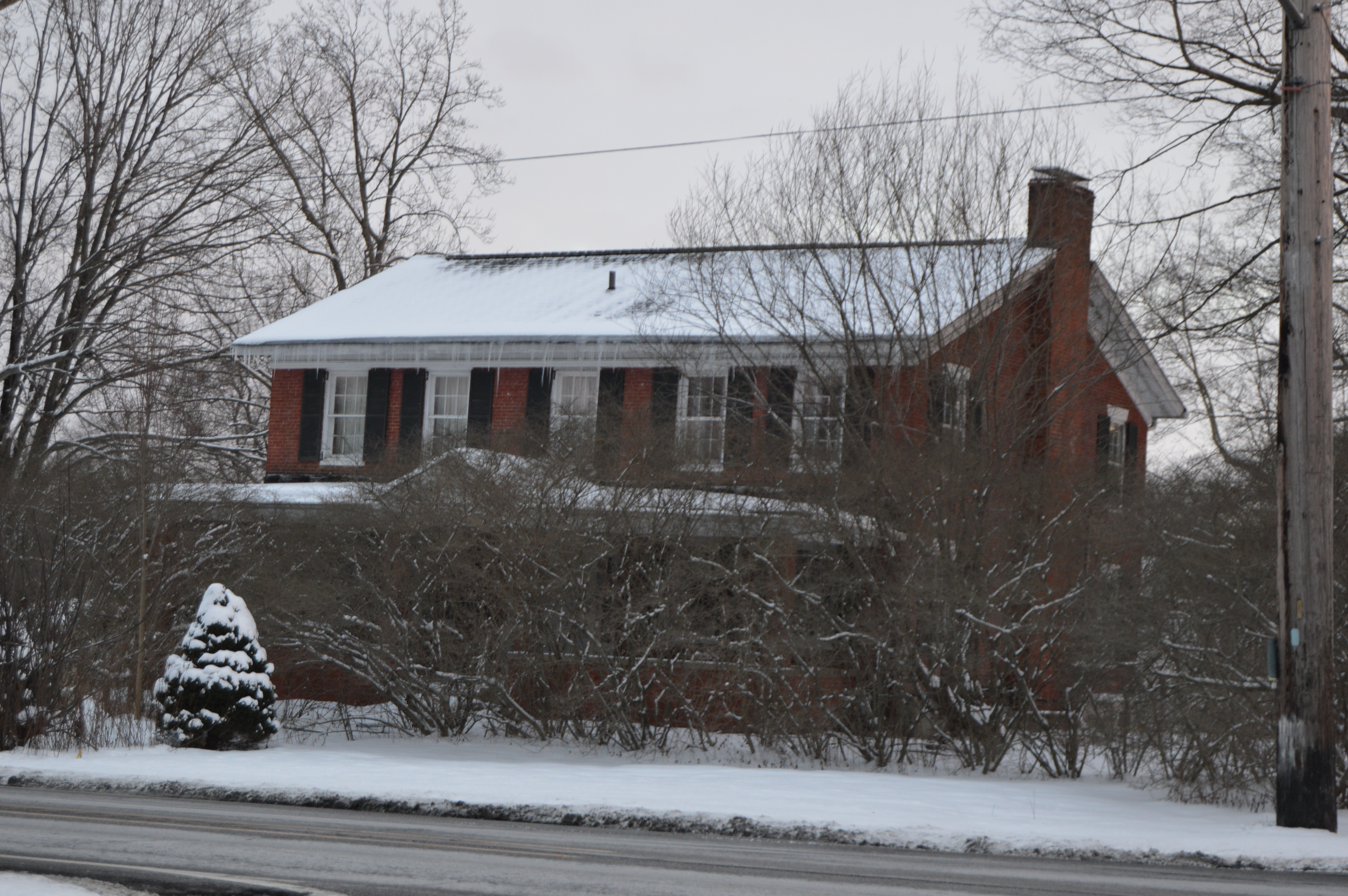
- Fox-Pope Farmhouse, built 1820

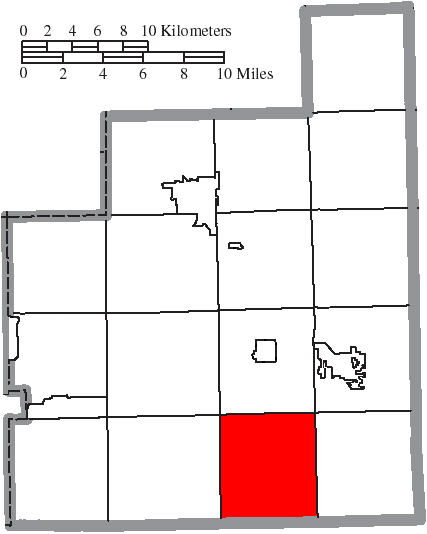
- Location of Troy Township in Geauga County
- Coordinates: 41°23′0″N 81°9′2″W
- Country: United States
- State: Ohio
- County: Geauga

Area
  - Total: 25.8 sq mi (66.7 km^{2})
  - Land: 25.1 sq mi (64.9 km^{2})
  - Water: 0.69 sq mi (1.8 km^{2})
- Elevation: 1,220 ft (372 m)

Population (2020)
  - Total: 2,778
  - Density: 112/sq mi (43.2/km^{2})
- Time zone: UTC-5 (Eastern (EST))
  - Summer (DST): UTC-4 (EDT)
- FIPS code: 39-77574
- GNIS feature ID: 1086162
- Website: https://www.troytwpgeauga.com/

Troy Township is one of the sixteen townships of Geauga County, Ohio, United States. As of the 2020 census the population was 2,778, up from 2,567 at the 2000 census.

== Geography ==
Located in the southern part of the county, it borders the following townships:

- Burton Township - north
- Middlefield Township - northeast corner
- Parkman Township - east
- Nelson Township, Portage County - southeast corner
- Hiram Township, Portage County - south
- Mantua Township, Portage County - southwest corner
- Auburn Township - west
- Newbury Township - northwest corner

No municipalities are located in Troy Township, although the unincorporated community of Welshfield is located in the township's center.

== Name and history ==
It is one of seven Troy Townships statewide.

== Government ==
The township is governed by a three-member board of trustees, who are elected in November of odd-numbered years to a four-year term beginning on the following January 1. Two are elected in the year after the presidential election and one is elected in the year before it. There is also an elected township fiscal officer, who serves a four-year term beginning on April 1 of the year after the election, which is held in November of the year before the presidential election. Vacancies in the fiscal officership or on the board of trustees are filled by the remaining trustees.
