= Parkman Township, Geauga County, Ohio =

Township in Ohio, US

- Township
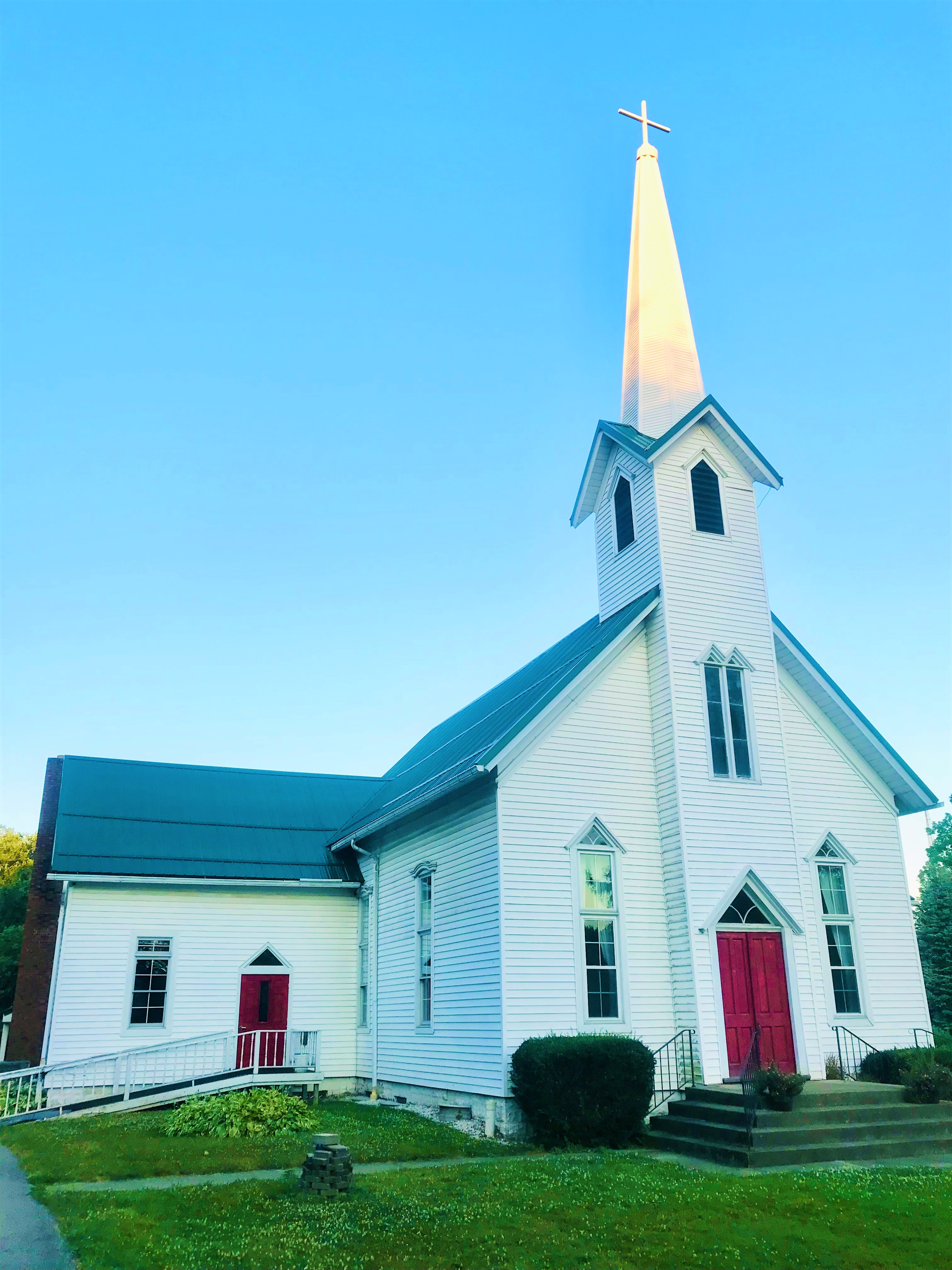

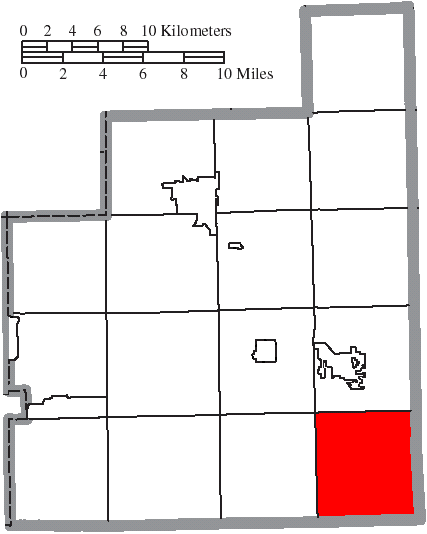
- Location of Parkman Township in Geauga County
- Coordinates: 41°22′41″N 81°3′1″W
- Country: United States
- State: Ohio
- County: Geauga

Area
  - Total: 27.0 sq mi (69.9 km^{2})
  - Land: 26.8 sq mi (69.5 km^{2})
  - Water: 0.15 sq mi (0.4 km^{2})
- Elevation: 1,198 ft (365 m)

Population (2020)
  - Total: 4,446
  - Density: 166/sq mi (64.0/km^{2})
- Time zone: UTC-5 (Eastern (EST))
  - Summer (DST): UTC-4 (EDT)
- ZIP code: 44080
- Area code: 440
- FIPS code: 39-59948
- GNIS feature ID: 1086159
- Website: https://www.parkmanohio.com/

Parkman Township is one of the sixteen townships of Geauga County, Ohio, United States. As of the 2020 census the population was 4,446, up from 4,136 at the previous census.

According to the 2020 "ACS 5-Year Estimates Data Profiles", 37.4% of the township's population spoke only English, while 62.6 spoke an "other [than Spanish] Indo-European language" (basically Pennsylvania German/German).

== History ==
Named for Samuel Parkman, an agent with the Connecticut Land Company, it is the only Parkman Township statewide.

== Geography ==
Located in the southeastern corner of the county, it borders the following townships:

- Middlefield Township - north
- Mesopotamia Township, Trumbull County - northeast corner
- Farmington Township, Trumbull County - east
- Southington Township, Trumbull County - southeast corner
- Nelson Township, Portage County - south
- Hiram Township, Portage County - southwest corner
- Troy Township - west
- Burton Township - northwest corner

No municipalities are located in Parkman Township, although the census-designated place of Parkman lies in the southern part of the township.

== Demographics ==
Historical population
Census	Pop.	Note	%±
1990	3,083		—
2000	3,546		15.0%
2010	4,131		16.5%
2020	4,446		7.6%
U.S. Censuses: 1990, 2000, 2010, and 2020

== Government ==
The township is governed by a three-member board of trustees, who are elected in November of odd-numbered years to a four-year term beginning on the following January 1. Two are elected in the year after the presidential election and one is elected in the year before it. There is also an elected township fiscal officer, who serves a four-year term beginning on April 1 of the year after the election, which is held in November of the year before the presidential election. Vacancies in the fiscal officership or on the board of trustees are filled by the remaining trustees.
