= East Claridon, Ohio =

- Unincorporated community
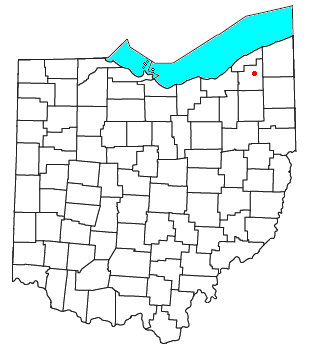
- Location of East Claridon, Ohio
- Coordinates: 41°31′57″N 81°06′56″W
- Country: United States
- State: Ohio
- County: Geauga
- Township: Claridon
- Elevation: 1,221 ft (372 m)
- Time zone: UTC-5 (Eastern (EST))
  - Summer (DST): UTC-4 (EDT)
- ZIP codes: 44033
- GNIS feature ID: 1064576

East Claridon is an unincorporated community in eastern Claridon Township, Geauga County, Ohio, United States. It has a post office with the ZIP code 44033. It lies at the intersection of U.S. Route 322 with State Route 608. The unincorporated community of Claridon lies to the west along Route 322.

== History ==
The first permanent settlement at East Claridon was made in 1829. A post office called East Claridon has been in operation since 1828.
