= Montville, Ohio =

- Unincorporated community
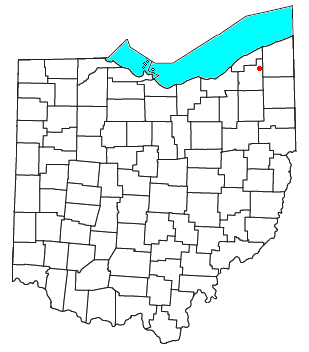
- Location of Montville, Ohio
- Coordinates: 41°36′26″N 81°03′01″W
- Country: United States
- State: Ohio
- County: Geauga
- Township: Montville
- Elevation: 1,204 ft (367 m)
- Time zone: UTC-5 (Eastern (EST))
  - Summer (DST): UTC-4 (EDT)
- ZIP codes: 44064
- GNIS feature ID: 1048983

Montville is an unincorporated community in central Montville Township, Geauga County, Ohio, United States. It has a post office with the ZIP code 44064. It lies at the intersection of U.S. Route 6 with State Route 528.

A post office called Montville has been in operation since 1825. The area of Montville was named for its lofty elevation.
