= Burton Township, Ohio =

Township in Ohio, US

Burton Township, Geauga County, Ohio
- Township
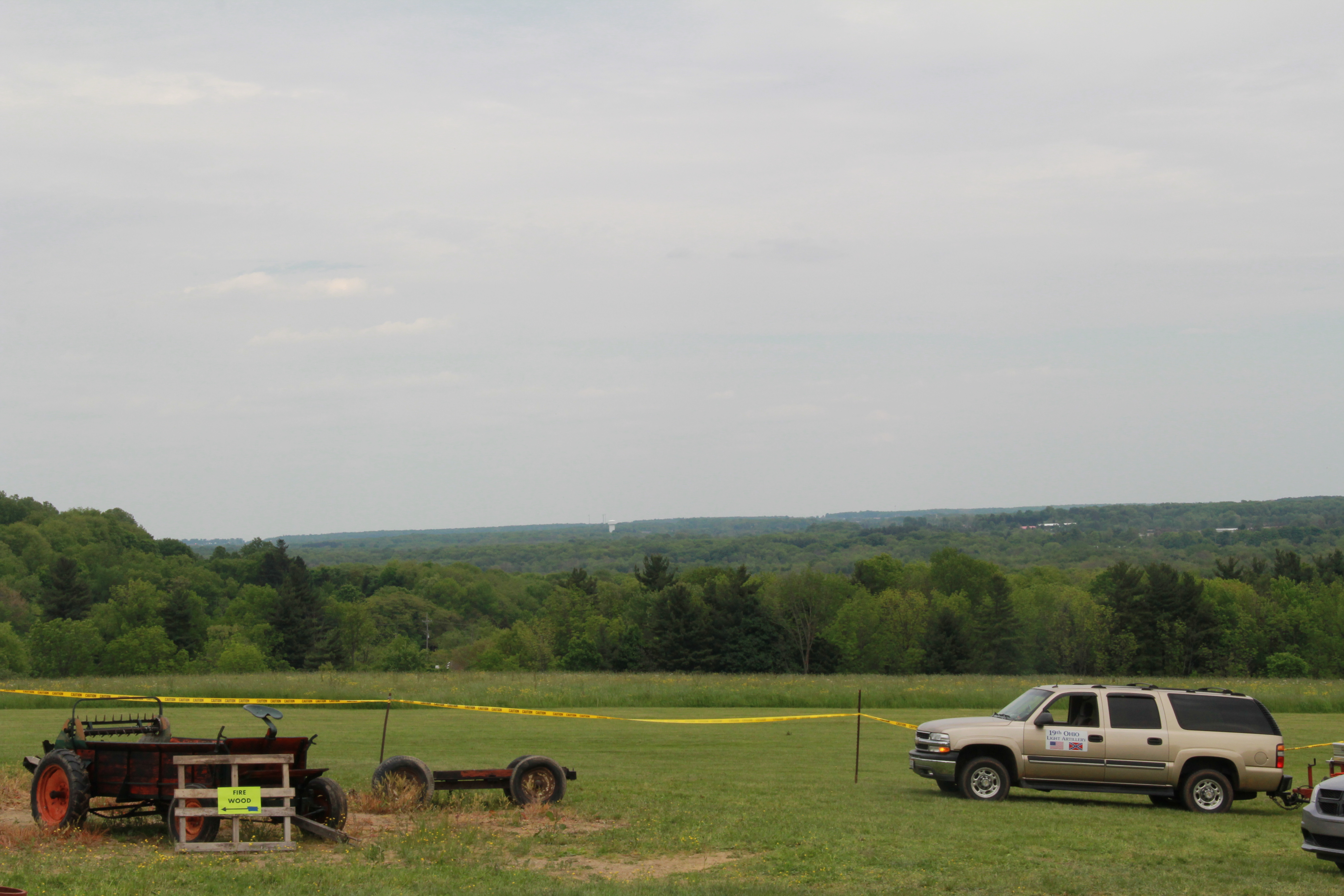

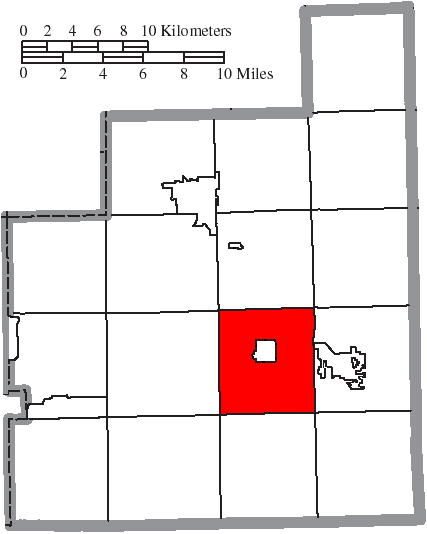
- Location of Burton Township in Geauga County
- Coordinates: 41°28′8″N 81°8′52″W
- Country: United States
- State: Ohio
- County: Geauga

Area
  - Total: 24.4 sq mi (63.1 km^{2})
  - Land: 23.8 sq mi (61.7 km^{2})
  - Water: 0.58 sq mi (1.5 km^{2})
- Elevation: 1,260 ft (384 m)

Population (2020)
  - Total: 4,379
  - Density: 184/sq mi (71.0/km^{2})
- Time zone: UTC-5 (Eastern (EST))
  - Summer (DST): UTC-4 (EDT)
- ZIP code: 44021
- Area code: 440
- FIPS code: 39-10464
- GNIS feature ID: 1086149
- Website: www.burtontownship.org

Burton Township is one of the sixteen townships of Geauga County, Ohio, United States. As of the 2020 census the population was 4,379.

== Geography ==
Located in the central part of the county, it borders the following townships:

- Claridon Township - north
- Huntsburg Township - northeast corner
- Middlefield Township - east
- Parkman Township - southeast corner
- Troy Township - south
- Auburn Township - southwest corner
- Newbury Township - west
- Munson Township - northwest corner

The village of Burton is located in central Burton Township. Hopsons Creek is a stream in Burton Township.

== Name and history ==
Burton Township was established in 1806, and named after Titus Burton, the son of a first settler. It is the only Burton Township statewide.

== Government ==
The township is governed by a five-member board of trustees, who are elected in November of odd-numbered years to a four-year term beginning on the following January 1. Two are elected in the year after the presidential election and one is elected in the year before it. There is also an elected township fiscal officer, who serves a four-year term beginning on April 1 of the year after the election, which is held in November of the year before the presidential election. Vacancies in the fiscal officership or on the board of trustees are filled by the remaining trustees.
