= Huntsburg Township, Geauga County, Ohio =

Township in Ohio, US

- Township
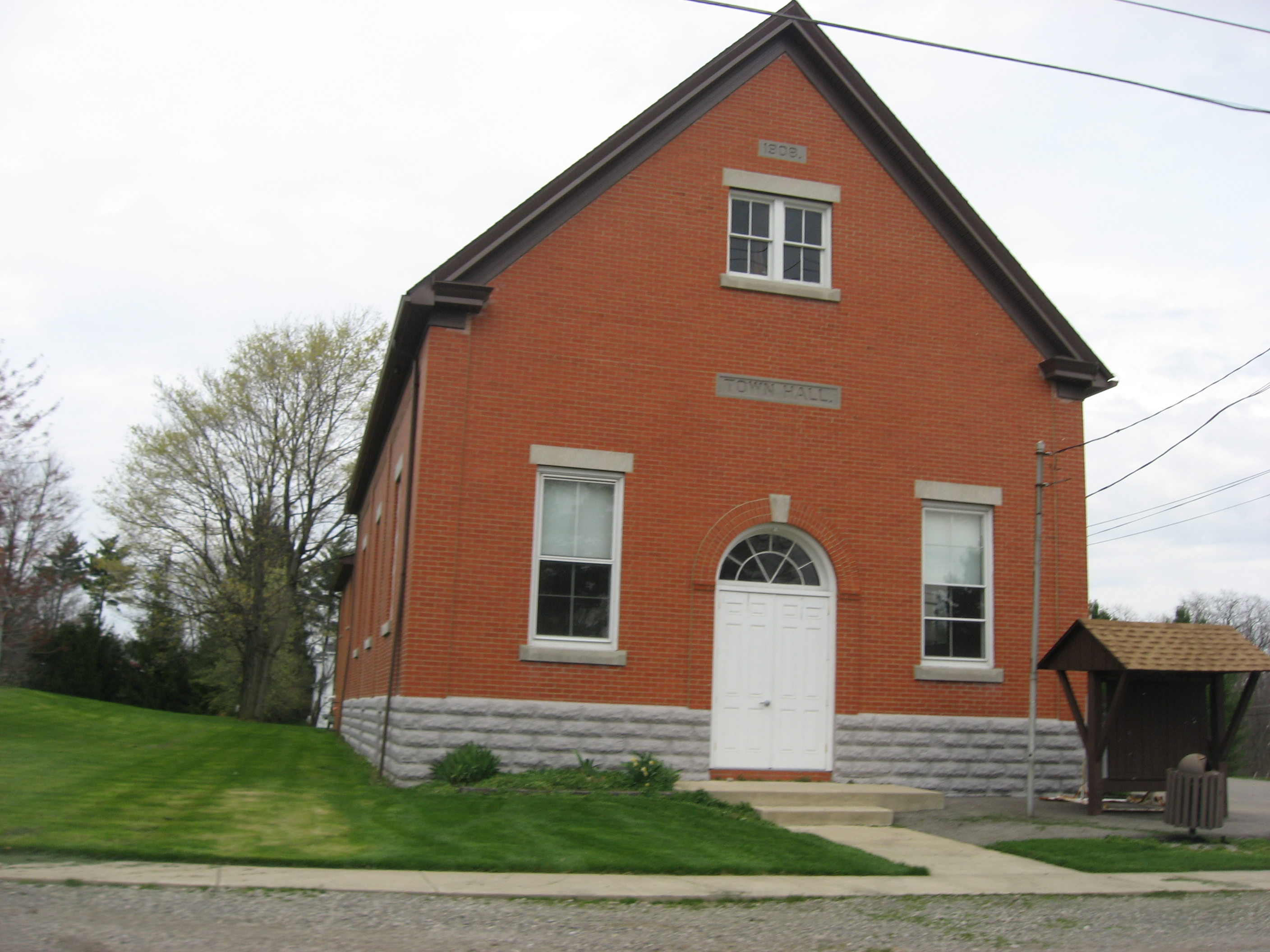
- Huntsburg Township's Town Hall

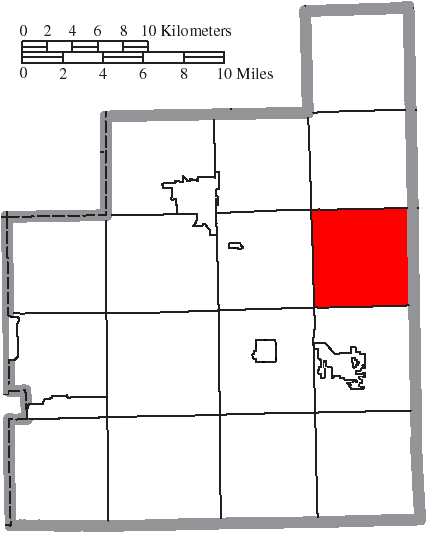
- Location of Huntsburg Township in Geauga County
- Coordinates: 41°32′30″N 81°3′33″W
- Country: United States
- State: Ohio
- County: Geauga

Area
  - Total: 24.4 sq mi (63.2 km^{2})
  - Land: 23.7 sq mi (61.3 km^{2})
  - Water: 0.69 sq mi (1.8 km^{2})
- Elevation: 1,260 ft (384 m)

Population (2020)
  - Total: 3,657
  - Density: 154/sq mi (59.5/km^{2})
- Time zone: UTC-5 (Eastern (EST))
  - Summer (DST): UTC-4 (EDT)
- ZIP code: 44046
- Area code: 440
- FIPS code: 39-36946
- GNIS feature ID: 1086154
- Website: huntsburg.org

Historical population
Census	Pop.	Note	%±
1990	2,642		—
2000	3,297		24.8%
2010	3,637		10.3%
2020	3,657		0.5%
U.S. Census:

Huntsburg Township is one of the sixteen townships of Geauga County, Ohio, United States. As of the 2020 census the population was 3,657, up from 3,297 at the 2000 census.

Huntsburg is home to a sizable Amish community that is part of the Middlefield settlement, the fourth largest in the world.

== Geography ==
Located in the eastern part of the county, it borders the following townships:

- Montville Township - north
- Hartsgrove Township, Ashtabula County - northeast corner
- Windsor Township, Ashtabula County - east
- Mesopotamia Township, Trumbull County - southeast corner
- Middlefield Township - south
- Burton Township - southwest corner
- Claridon Township - west
- Hambden Township - northwest corner

No municipalities are located in Huntsburg Township.

== Name and history ==
Huntsburg Township was established in 1821. The township was named for Dr. Eben Hunt, an original owner of the land. It is the only Huntsburg Township statewide.

== Government ==
The township is governed by a three-member board of trustees, who are elected in November of odd-numbered years to a four-year term beginning on the following January 1. Two are elected in the year after the presidential election and one is elected in the year before it. There is also an elected township fiscal officer, who serves a four-year term beginning on April 1 of the year after the election, which is held in November of the year before the presidential election. Vacancies in the fiscal officership or on the board of trustees are filled by the remaining trustees.

== Huntsburg Pumpkin Festival ==
A Pumpkin Festival is held near the town hall each year in October. The festival features giant pumpkins, live performers, contests, food vendors and more.
