= Middlefield Township, Geauga County, Ohio =

Township in Ohio, US

- Township
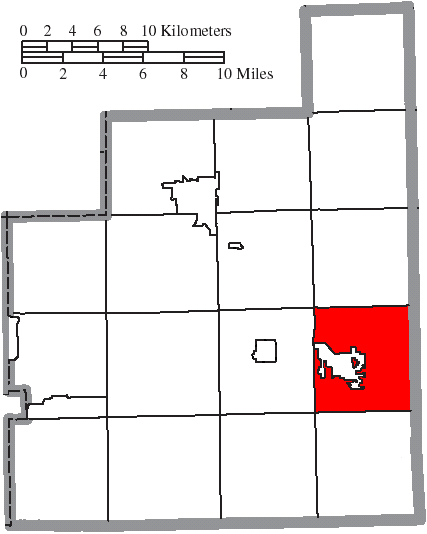
- Location of Middlefield Township in Geauga County
- Coordinates: 41°27′42″N 81°3′25″W
- Country: United States
- State: Ohio
- County: Geauga

Area
  - Total: 23.0 sq mi (59.5 km^{2})
  - Land: 22.8 sq mi (59.0 km^{2})
  - Water: 0.19 sq mi (0.5 km^{2})
- Elevation: 1,165 ft (355 m)

Population (2020)
  - Total: 4,525
  - Density: 199/sq mi (76.7/km^{2})
- Time zone: UTC-5 (Eastern (EST))
  - Summer (DST): UTC-4 (EDT)
- ZIP code: 44062
- Area code: 440
- FIPS code: 39-49714
- GNIS feature ID: 1086155
- Website: https://middlefieldtownship.us/

Middlefield Township is one of the sixteen townships of Geauga County, Ohio, United States. As of the 2020 census the population was 4,525.

== Geography ==
Located in the southeastern part of the county, it borders the following townships:

- Huntsburg Township - north
- Windsor Township, Ashtabula County - northeast corner
- Mesopotamia Township, Trumbull County - east
- Farmington Township, Trumbull County - southeast corner
- Parkman Township - south
- Troy Township - southwest corner
- Burton Township - west
- Claridon Township - northwest corner

The village of Middlefield is located in western Middlefield Township.

== Name and history ==
Middlefield Township was so named for its location roughly halfway between Warren and Painesville. It is the only Middlefield Township statewide.

== Economy ==
Some of Middlefield's Amish continue to farm with horses, while other farmers use modern machinery.

The Middlefield Cheese House has manufactured cheese locally since 1956, and gives public tours. In addition to tourism, other major employers include Middlefield Plastics, Mercury Plastics, and Masco Corporation, which manufactures KraftMaid kitchen cabinets.

== Government ==
The township is governed by a three-member board of trustees, who are elected in November of odd-numbered years to a four-year term beginning on the following January 1. Two are elected in the year after the presidential election and one is elected in the year before it. There is also an elected township fiscal officer, who serves a four-year term beginning on April 1 of the year after the election, which is held in November of the year before the presidential election. Vacancies in the fiscal officership or on the board of trustees are filled by the remaining trustees.
