= Geauga County, Ohio =

County in Ohio, United States

- County
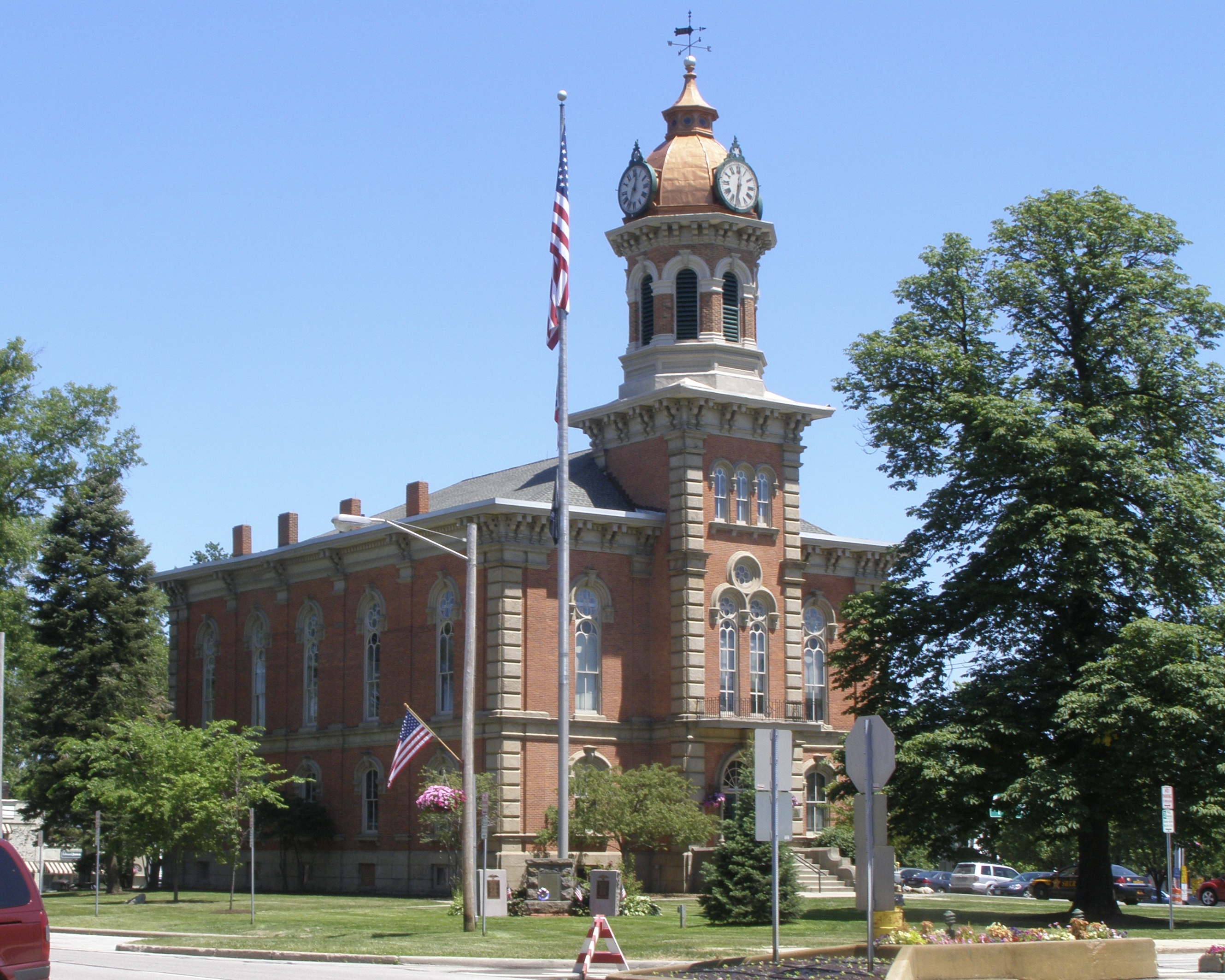
- Geauga County Courthouse

- Flag Seal

- Location within the U.S. state of Ohio
- Coordinates: 41°30′N 81°10′W
- Country: United States
- State: Ohio
- Founded: March 1, 1806
- Named for: an Iroquoian word for "raccoon"
- Seat: Chardon
- Largest city: Chardon

Area
  - Total: 408 sq mi (1,060 km^{2})
  - Land: 400 sq mi (1,000 km^{2})
  - Water: 8.1 sq mi (21 km^{2}) 2.0%

Population (2020)
  - Total: 95,397
  - Estimate (2025): 95,676 ▲
  - Density: 239.2/sq mi (92.4/km^{2})
- Time zone: UTC−5 (Eastern)
  - Summer (DST): UTC−4 (EDT)
- Congressional district: 14th
- Website: geauga.oh.gov

Geauga County (/dʒiˈɔːɡə/ jee-AW-gə) is a county located in the northeast portion of the U.S. state of Ohio. As of the 2020 census, the population was 95,397. The county seat and largest city is Chardon.

The county is named for an Onondaga or Seneca language word meaning "raccoon", originally the name of the Grand River.

Geauga County is part of the Cleveland, OH Metropolitan Statistical Area.

In 2008, Forbes magazine ranked Geauga County as the fourth best place in the United States to raise a family.

About 20% of the counties' area (Geauga, Trumbull, Ashtabula and Portage) population was Amish, as of 2017.

== History ==
Geauga County is named after the Onondaga word jyo’ä·gak or Seneca jo’ä·ka, both meaning 'raccoon' (originally the name of the Grand River).

After the discovery of the New World, the land that became Geauga County was originally part of the French colony of Canada (New France), which was ceded in 1763 to Great Britain and renamed Province of Quebec. In the late 18th century the land became part of the Connecticut Western Reserve in the Northwest Territory, and then was purchased by the Connecticut Land Company in 1795.

Geauga County was founded on March 1, 1806, as the second county in the Connecticut Western Reserve, originating from Trumbull County, Ohio. In 1808, the size of Geauga County was reduced by the creation of Ashtabula County, Cuyahoga County, and Lake County.

The present-day boundaries were established in 1840 following the creation of Lake County. A disagreement about the location of the county seat began in 1808 when commissioners from Trumbull County began the process of identifying the seat of justice. Residents in the northern townships wanted the seat in Champion, renamed Painesville, Ohio in 1832. Residents in southern townships desired a centrally located county seat and took advantage of a tract of land donated by Peter Chardon Brooks called Chardon, Ohio. Despite Chardon being selected in 1809, the argument was never really settled. Over the next two decades, population growth in the seven northern townships exceeded the remaining sixteen southern townships, further fueling the disagreement. On January 21, 1840, a petition to create Lake County from seven townships in northern Geauga County and Willoughby Township from Cuyahoga County were presented to the Ohio House of Representatives. Seabury Ford presented petitions against its creation. Lake County was established in March 1840 by the Ohio Legislature. As the newly formed Lake County did not have sufficient territory to meet the requirements for a county, the northern border included submerged land beneath the waters of Lake Erie.

The first settlement in Geauga was at Burton, Ohio in the year 1798, when three families settled there from Connecticut.

== Geography ==
According to the U.S. Census Bureau, the county has an area of 408 square miles (1,060 km^{2}), of which 400 square miles (1,000 km^{2}) is land and 8.1 square miles (21 km^{2}) (2.0%) is water.

Geauga County receives the most precipitation of any county in northern Ohio, with most of the county receiving over 42 inches annually in an average year, and some parts exceeding 44 inches.

=== Drainage system ===
The geography of Geauga County was radically changed by Illinoian and Wisconsinan glaciation, which is evident in the deranged drainage system, landscape change, and glacial till. The headwaters of three watercourses in the Lake Erie basin are in Geauga County. These include the Cuyahoga River, Chagrin River, and Grand River. Portions of all three are designated Ohio Scenic Rivers.

Point sources of the east branch of the Cuyahoga River are in Hambden Township, Claridon Township, and Burton Township. The point source of the west branch of the Cuyahoga River is near the intersection of Pond and Rapids Roads in Burton Township.

The point sources of the east branch of the Chagrin River are at Bass Lake in Munson Township and the southwest corner of the city of Chardon. McFarland Creek in Bainbridge Township, sometimes referred to as Chagrin Falls because of the postal zip code, is a tributary of the Aurora branch of the Chagrin River.

Point sources of the Grand River are in Parkman Township, Troy Township, and Swine Creek in Middlefield Township.

While the majority of waterways in Geauga County are part of the Lake Erie watershed, the Silver Creek in Troy Township is a tributary to the west branch of the Mahoning River, part of the Ohio River watershed, the largest tributary to the Mississippi River. There is another Silver Creek in Geauga County in Russell Township, which is a tributary to the east branch of the Chagrin River.

=== Adjacent counties ===
- Lake County (north)
- Ashtabula County (northeast)
- Trumbull County (southeast)
- Portage County (south)
- Cuyahoga County (west)
- Summit County (southwest)

== Demographics ==
Historical population
Census	Pop.	Note	%±
1810	2,917		—
1820	7,791		167.1%
1830	15,813		103.0%
1840	16,297		3.1%
1850	17,827		9.4%
1860	15,817		−11.3%
1870	14,190		−10.3%
1880	14,251		0.4%
1890	13,489		−5.3%
1900	14,744		9.3%
1910	14,670		−0.5%
1920	15,036		2.5%
1930	15,414		2.5%
1940	19,430		26.1%
1950	26,646		37.1%
1960	47,573		78.5%
1970	62,977		32.4%
1980	74,474		18.3%
1990	81,129		8.9%
2000	90,895		12.0%
2010	93,389		2.7%
2020	95,397		2.2%
2025 (est.)	95,676	▲	0.3%
U.S. Decennial Census:

=== 2020 census ===
As of the 2020 census, the county had a population of 95,397. The median age was 45.8 years, 22.5% of residents were under the age of 18, and 22.3% were 65 years of age or older. For every 100 females there were 97.7 males, and for every 100 females age 18 and over there were 95.6 males age 18 and over.

The racial makeup of the county was 93.7% White, 1.1% Black or African American, 0.1% American Indian and Alaska Native, 0.7% Asian, <0.1% Native Hawaiian and Pacific Islander, 0.6% from some other race, and 3.8% from two or more races. Hispanic or Latino residents of any race comprised 1.7% of the population.

21.4% of residents lived in urban areas, while 78.6% lived in rural areas.

There were 35,460 households in the county, of which 29.1% had children under the age of 18 living in them. Of all households, 61.7% were married-couple households, 14.6% were households with a male householder and no spouse or partner present, and 19.2% were households with a female householder and no spouse or partner present. About 22.8% of all households were made up of individuals and 12.0% had someone living alone who was 65 years of age or older.

There were 37,419 housing units, of which 5.2% were vacant. Among occupied housing units, 86.6% were owner-occupied and 13.4% were renter-occupied. The homeowner vacancy rate was 1.0% and the rental vacancy rate was 7.0%.

=== Racial and ethnic composition ===
Geauga County, Ohio – racial and ethnic composition Note: the US Census treats Hispanic/Latino as an ethnic category. This table excludes Latinos from the racial categories and assigns them to a separate category. Hispanics/Latinos may be of any race.
Race / ethnicity (NH = Non-Hispanic)	Pop 1980	Pop 1990	Pop 2000	Pop 2010	Pop 2020	% 1980	% 1990	% 2000	% 2010	% 2020
White alone (NH)	72,877	79,379	88,161	89,766	88,958	97.86%	97.84%	96.99%	96.12%	93.25%
Black or African American alone (NH)	980	1,056	1,104	1,187	1,075	1.32%	1.30%	1.21%	1.27%	1.13%
Native American or Alaska Native alone (NH)	34	79	60	61	36	0.05%	0.10%	0.07%	0.07%	0.04%
Asian alone (NH)	239	306	382	552	666	0.32%	0.38%	0.42%	0.59%	0.70%
Native Hawaiian or Pacific Islander alone (NH)	x	x	10	11	8	x	x	0.01%	0.01%	0.01%
Other race alone (NH)	39	15	45	78	220	0.05%	0.02%	0.05%	0.08%	0.23%
Mixed-race or multiracial (NH)	x	x	595	733	2,770	x	x	0.65%	0.78%	2.90%
Hispanic or Latino (any race)	305	294	538	1,001	1,664	0.41%	0.36%	0.59%	1.07%	1.74%
Total	74,474	81,129	90,895	93,389	95,397	100.00%	100.00%	100.00%	100.00%	100.00%

=== 2010 census ===
As of the 2010 United States census, there were 93,389 people, 34,264 households, and 25,654 families residing in the county. The population density was 233.4 inhabitants per square mile (90.1/km^{2}). There were 36,574 housing units at an average density of 91.4 units per square mile (35.3 units/km^{2}). The racial makeup of the county was 96.9% white, 1.3% black or African American, 0.6% Asian, 0.1% American Indian, 0.3% from other races, and 0.8% from two or more races. Those of Hispanic or Latino origin made up 1.1% of the population. In terms of ancestry, 27.4% were German, 17.1% were Irish, 13.8% were Italian, 13.8% were English, 8.3% were Polish, 5.5% were Hungarian, and 3.6% were American.

Of the 34,264 households, 33.6% had children under the age of 18 living with them, 63.8% were married couples living together, 7.7% had a female householder with no husband present, 25.1% were non-families, and 21.2% of all households were made up of individuals. The average household size was 2.70 and the average family size was 3.16. The median age was 43.3 years.

The median income for a household in the county was $89,663 and the median income for a family was $101,780. Males had a median income of $94,863 versus $40,565 for females. The per capita income for the county was $32,735. About 5.0% of families and 7.6% of the population were below the poverty line, including 10.8% of those under age 18 and 6.4% of those age 65 or over.

=== 2000 census ===
As of the census of 2010, there were 93,389 people, 34,264 households, and 25,654 families residing in the county. The population density was 231.1 inhabitants per square mile (89.2/km^{2}). There were 34,264 occupied housing units at an average density of 84.8 units per square mile (32.7 units/km^{2}). The racial makeup of the county was 97.0% White, 1.4% Black or African American, 0.1% Native American, 0.6% Asian, 0.001% Pacific Islander, 0.3% from other races, and 0.8% from two or more races. 88.1% spoke English, 4.6% German, 1.2% Spanish, and 3.3% spoke other West Germanic languages.

There were 34,264 households, out of which 31.6% had children under the age of 18 living with them, 63.8% were married couples living together, 7.70% had a female householder with no husband present, 3.50% had a male householder with no wife present, and 25.10% were non-families. 25.10% of all households were made up of individuals, and 9.50% had someone living alone who was 65 years of age or older. The average household size was 2.70 and the average family size was 3.16.

In the county, the population was spread out, with 26.0% under the age of 18, 6.60% from 18 to 24, 20.1% from 25 to 44, 31.8% from 45 to 64, and 15.50% who were 65 years of age or older. The median age was 43.3 years. For every 100 females there were 96.85 males. For every 100 females age 18 and over, there were 93.72 males.

As of the census of 2000, 0.59% of the population were Hispanic or Latino of any race, 26.8% were of German, 15.3% Irish, 14.3% English, 10.8% Italian 7.5% Polish and 5.2% American ancestry. According to Census 2000, 89.4% spoke English, 5.1% German, 1.5% Pennsylvania Dutch and 1.0% Spanish as their first language.

As of the census of 2000, the median income for a household in the county was $60,200, and the median income for a family was $67,427. Males had a median income of $48,443 versus $30,567 for females. The per capita income for the county was $27,944. About 2.80% of families and 4.60% of the population were below the poverty line, including 6.10% of those under age 18 and 5.10% of those age 65 or over. The median household income and per capita income were the second highest among Ohio counties after Delaware, and 74th and 79th in the country, respectively.

== Religion ==
Religion in Geauga County, according to ARDA (2020)
1. Catholic Church (34.0%)
2. Other Evangelical churches (19.9%)
3. Anabaptist churches (Amish and Mennonite) (10.3%)
4. Mainline Protestant churches (6.90%)
5. Black Protestant churches (0.50%)
6. Others (1.50%)
7. None (26.8%)

Religious affiliations in Geauga County, according to ARDA 2010-2020
Religion	2010		2020	
Religion	Number	%	Number	%
Christianity	52,788	56.5	67,801	71.6
— Anabaptist churches	8,870	9.5	9,803	10.3
— Other Evangelical churches	4,865	5.2	18,533	19.9
— Catholic Church	30,880	33,1	32,469	34.0
— Mainline Protestant churches	7,738	8.3	6,564	6.9
-Black Protestant churches	185	0.2	432	0.5
Other religions	250	0.3	1,417	1.5
None*	40,601	43,5	27,596	28.9
Total population	93,389		95,397	
*"None" is an unclear category. It is a heterogenous group of the not religious and intermittently religious. Researchers argue that most of the "Nones" should be considered "unchurched", rather than objectively nonreligious, especially since most "Nones" do hold some religious-spiritual beliefs and a notable amount participate in religious behaviors. For example, 72% of American "Nones" believe in God or a higher power.

== Government ==
=== Congressional representation ===
==== U.S. representation ====
Ohio's 14th Congressional District

U.S. Senate

==== State representation ====
76th Ohio House District 99th Ohio House District

18th Ohio Senate District 32nd Ohio Senate District

=== Judiciary ===
U.S. 6th Circuit Court of Appeals

Ohio 11th District Courts of Appeals

== Politics ==
Geauga County is a Republican stronghold, having voted Democratic for president only once since 1856, in Lyndon B. Johnson's 1964 landslide, but Franklin D. Roosevelt came within just 220 votes in 1936.

United States presidential election results for Geauga County, Ohio
Year	Republican		Democratic		Third party(ies)	
Year	No.	%	No.	%	No.	%
1856	2,694	80.97%	575	17.28%	58	1.74%
1860	2,877	79.70%	677	18.75%	56	1.55%
1864	2,974	85.73%	495	14.27%	0	0.00%
1868	2,892	81.88%	640	18.12%	0	0.00%
1872	2,711	81.66%	600	18.07%	9	0.27%
1876	3,004	78.62%	808	21.15%	9	0.24%
1880	3,053	77.72%	815	20.75%	60	1.53%
1884	2,960	74.60%	824	20.77%	184	4.64%
1888	2,712	71.80%	843	22.32%	222	5.88%
1892	2,267	68.80%	758	23.00%	270	8.19%
1896	2,807	68.20%	1,260	30.61%	49	1.19%
1900	2,816	69.77%	1,117	27.68%	103	2.55%
1904	2,762	81.24%	544	16.00%	94	2.76%
1908	2,596	71.20%	982	26.93%	68	1.87%
1912	579	18.22%	873	27.47%	1,726	54.31%
1916	1,806	56.12%	1,345	41.80%	67	2.08%
1920	3,722	76.69%	1,081	22.27%	50	1.03%
1924	3,375	72.39%	635	13.62%	652	13.99%
1928	4,161	77.37%	1,180	21.94%	37	0.69%
1932	3,836	59.44%	2,396	37.12%	222	3.44%
1936	3,620	49.49%	3,400	46.49%	294	4.02%
1940	5,371	61.81%	3,318	38.19%	0	0.00%
1944	5,295	61.86%	3,264	38.14%	0	0.00%
1948	5,535	64.20%	2,960	34.33%	127	1.47%
1952	8,975	68.09%	4,207	31.91%	0	0.00%
1956	10,971	69.49%	4,818	30.51%	0	0.00%
1960	12,491	59.44%	8,522	40.56%	0	0.00%
1964	9,423	43.55%	12,212	56.45%	0	0.00%
1968	11,857	51.76%	7,825	34.16%	3,226	14.08%
1972	15,624	66.27%	7,329	31.09%	624	2.65%
1976	15,004	57.12%	10,449	39.78%	816	3.11%
1980	17,762	58.81%	9,542	31.59%	2,900	9.60%
1984	22,369	68.29%	9,954	30.39%	431	1.32%
1988	22,339	64.55%	11,874	34.31%	395	1.14%
1992	18,200	44.92%	11,466	28.30%	10,852	26.78%
1996	19,662	50.30%	14,143	36.18%	5,284	13.52%
2000	25,417	59.66%	15,327	35.98%	1,856	4.36%
2004	30,370	60.21%	19,850	39.35%	222	0.44%
2008	29,096	56.78%	21,250	41.47%	899	1.75%
2012	30,589	59.85%	19,659	38.46%	865	1.69%
2016	30,227	59.66%	17,569	34.68%	2,866	5.66%
2020	34,143	60.95%	21,201	37.84%	677	1.21%
2024	33,844	61.32%	20,604	37.33%	741	1.34%

United States Senate election results for Geauga County, Ohio1
Year	Republican		Democratic		Third party(ies)	
Year	No.	%	No.	%	No.	%
2024	30,987	56.72%	22,315	40.85%	1,330	2.43%

=== County officials ===
County officials
Party	Name	Position
R	Ralph Spidalieri	Commissioner
R	Tim Lennon	Commissioner
R	James Dvorak	Commissioner
R	Charles Walder	Auditor
R	Sheila Bevington	Clerk of courts
R	Dr. John Urbancic	Coroner
R	Joseph Cattell	Engineer
R	James Flaiz	Prosecuting attorney
R	Celesta Mullins	Recorder
R	Scott A. Hildenbrand	Sheriff
R	Christopher P. Hitchcock	Treasurer

== Education ==
=== Public school districts ===
Geauga County is home to the administrative offices of six public school districts as illustrated in this list of school districts in Ohio.

The Geauga County Educational Service Center provides collaborative programs and services for the seven local school districts in Geauga County, leveraging resources to reduce overall costs to each district. The ESC has formed a P-16 bridge initiative whose mission is "to create workforce readiness in our youth and adults through substantive partnerships between educators, businesses, community organizations, parents focusing on important transitions experienced at each level. Geauga County P-16 will develop a sustainable process and program to insure its continued success".

District	Location	Communities served
Berkshire Local School District	Burton, Ohio	Burton Township, Burton Village, most of Claridon Township, Troy Township, Welshfield, Montville and Thompson Townships
Cardinal Local School District	Middlefield, Ohio	Huntsburg Township, Middlefield Township, Middlefield Village, Parkman Township, small part of Mespotamia (Trumbull County)
Chardon Local School District	Chardon, Ohio	Chardon City, Chardon Township, part of Claridon Township, Hambden Township, most of Munson Township, very small part of Concord Township (Lake County)
Kenston Local School District	Bainbridge Township, Ohio	Auburn Township, most of Bainbridge Township
West Geauga County Local School District	Chester Township, Ohio	Chester Township, Chesterland, Newbury Township, a small part of Hunting Valley, a part of Munson Township, and an unincorporated part of Russell Township

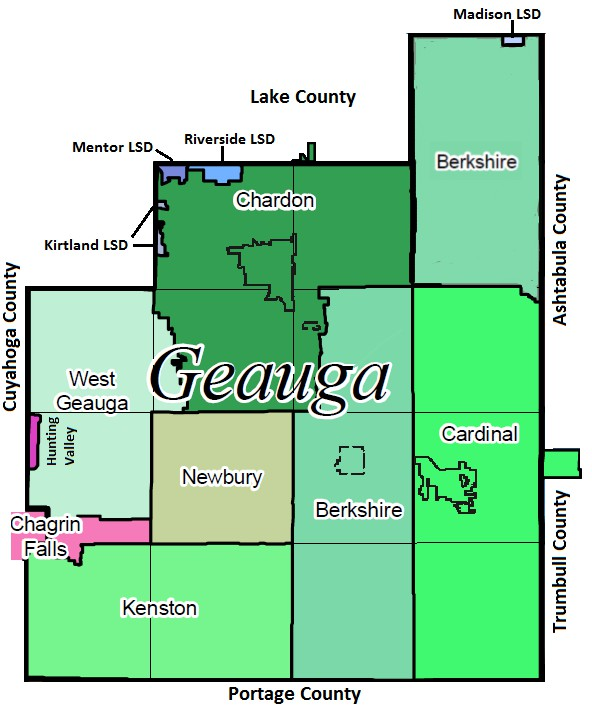
Map of public school districts in Geauga County with township boundaries superimposed. Newbury Local School District has since been merged into West Geauga Schools.

In addition, there are six neighboring public school districts that serve portions of Geauga County.

District	Location	Communities served in Geauga County
Chagrin Falls Exempted Village School District	Chagrin Falls, Ohio and South Russell, Ohio	South Russell Village; small parts of Bainbridge and Russell Townships
Kirtland Local School District	Kirtland, Ohio	small part of Chardon Township
Madison Local School District	Madison, Ohio	small part of Thompson Township
Mentor Public Schools	Mentor, Ohio	small part of Chardon Township
Orange City School District	Pepper Pike, Ohio	the section of Hunting Valley in Geauga County
Riverside Local School District	Painesville, Ohio	small part of Chardon Township

=== Joint Vocational School District ===
Taxpayers in six of the seven school districts in Geauga County support a Joint Vocational School District (JVSD) at the Auburn Career Center in Concord Township, Ohio. The career center offers a variety of programs in health, education, and hands-on technology.

=== Private and parochial schools ===
Geauga County is home to eight private, parochial, and/or specialized schools.

District	Location	Communities served
Agape Christian Academy	Burton Township, Ohio and Troy Township, Ohio	Accepts applications prior to the start of each school year
Hawken School	Gates Mills, Ohio	College preparatory day school: online application, site visit and testing
Hershey Montessori School	Huntsburg Township, Ohio	Co-ed school and boarding community serving students in 7th-12th grade. Chartered by Ohio Department of Education. New applications accepted year round.
Notre Dame-Cathedral Latin	Munson Township, Ohio	Roman Catholic Diocese of Cleveland: open to 8th grade students who have attended a Catholic elementary school and others who have not
Solon/Bainbridge Montessori School of Languages	Bainbridge Township, Ohio	nonsectarian Montessori School: quarterly enrollment periods
Saint Anselm School	Chester Township, Ohio	Roman Catholic Diocese of Cleveland K - 8th grade; preschool
Saint Helen's School	Newbury, Ohio	Roman Catholic Diocese of Cleveland K - 8th grade; parishioners and non-parishioners
Saint Mary's School	Chardon, Ohio	Roman Catholic Diocese of Cleveland preschool - 8th grade; parishioners and non-parishioners
Laurel School Butler Campus	Russell Township, Ohio	Private, K-12, girls-only, college preparatory

=== Higher education ===
Geauga County has one institution of higher learning:

- Kent State University - Geauga is in Burton, Ohio. KSU - Geauga is one of seven regional campuses of Kent State University. The 87-acre (35 ha) Burton Township campus was established as an academic center in 1964 and became a regional campus in 1976. As of 2011, more than 2,000 full and part-time students were enrolled. The Geauga campus does not have any student housing. KSU -Geauga offers a variety of academic programs, including certificate programs, associate's degrees, and bachelor's degrees in business, education, general studies, nursing, science, and technology.

== Transportation ==
=== Airports ===
The Geauga County Airport is located one nautical mile (1.2 mi; 1.9 km) southeast of Middlefield's central business district.

The Geauga County Airport sits on 41 acres purchased by the Middlefield Chamber of Commerce and donated to Geauga County. Ground was broken August 31, 1967, and it was officially opened September 29, 1968. The airport has one 3500' long by 65' wide runway. Runway numbers are 11 on the west end and 29 on the east end. There are two T-hangars, one private hangar, two community hangars, a pilot lounge and restroom facility.

=== Public transportation ===
The mostly rural nature of Geauga County limits the feasibility of a fixed-route transit system. Instead, Geauga County Transit offers a demand-responsive door-to-door transit system within the county, with some out-of-county service. As of 2015, one-way fares for door-to-door service were $6.00, with 50% discounts for the elderly, disabled, or children 6 years to 17 years old. Children 5 years and younger are free. Out-of-county fares are two times the posted in-county fares. Service is provided 6:00 AM to 9:00 PM Monday through Friday. Reservations are suggested with at least three days notice, but can be made up to one week in advance.

=== State highways ===
- State Route 43
- State Route 44
- State Route 86
- State Route 87
- State Route 88
- State Route 166
- State Route 168
- State Route 306
- State Route 528
- State Route 608
- State Route 700

=== U.S. highways ===
- U.S. Route 6 Grand Army of the Republic Highway honoring American Civil War Veterans
- U.S. Route 322
- U.S. Route 422

== Communities ==
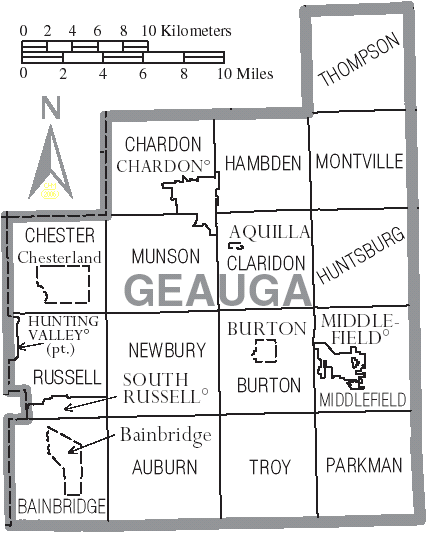
Map of Geauga County, Ohio, with municipal and township labels

=== City ===
- Chardon (county seat)

=== Villages ===
- Burton
- Hunting Valley
- Middlefield
- South Russell

=== Townships ===
- Auburn
- Bainbridge
- Burton
- Chardon
- Chester
- Claridon
- Hambden
- Huntsburg
- Middlefield
- Montville
- Munson
- Newbury
- Parkman
- Russell
- Thompson
- Troy

=== Census-designated places ===
- Bainbridge
- Bass Lake
- Chesterland
- Parkman

=== Unincorporated communities ===
- Aquilla
- Bostwick
- Bundysburg
- Claridon
- East Claridon
- Fowlers Mill
- Fullertown
- Hampden
- Huntsburg
- Materials Park
- Montville
- Newbury Center
- Novelty
- Popes Corners
- Russell Center
- South Newbury
- South Thompson
- Thompson
- Welshfield

== Notable people ==
- Leman Copley, early Mormon elder
- Stefan Dechant, Academy Award-nominated production designer and art director (Bainbridge)
- Larry Dolan, attorney and the owner of the Cleveland Guardians
- Seabury Ford, lawyer, governor of Ohio (1849-1850)
- Charles Martin Hall, inventor of modern aluminum production process
- Peter Hitchcock, lawyer, soldier, legislator, judge
- Aaron "Aalias" Kleinstub, musician, producer of top hit “The Monster” (Auburn)
- General Mortimer Leggett, Civil War general, commander of Volunteer Army of Ohio
- Frances Spatz Leighton, writer
- Charles C. Paine, politician
- Halbert Eleazer Paine, lawyer, Civil War Union general, congressman from Wisconsin, Commissioner of Patents (1879-1881)
- Seth Ledyard Phelps, Civil War officer, president of the District of Columbia Board of Commissioners (1878–1879)
- Albert Gallatin Riddle, lawyer, educator, Ohio House of Representatives (1848-1850)
- Nick Schuyler, author (Not Without Hope)
- JoAnn M. Tenorio, entomologist in Hawaii
- Brigham Young, Mormon leader

=== Athletes ===
- Andrew Brown, professional baseball pitcher
- Mel Harder, professional baseball pitcher for the Cleveland Indians
- Matt Hutter, NASCAR driver
- Leroy Kemp, collegiate and Olympian wrestler
- Tom Kipp, international professional motorcycle racing champion

=== Musical artists and groups ===
- The Chardon Polka Band, Cleveland-Style polka band
- Midnight Syndicate, Gothic rock band
- John Popper, frontman for rock band Blues Traveler

== See also ==
- Geauga Park District
- Geauga County Fair
- Geauga County Maple Festival
- National Register of Historic Places listings in Geauga County, Ohio
