= South Thompson, Ohio =

Unincorporated community in Ohio, U.S.

Coordinates: 41°38′52″N 81°02′41″W

South Thompson is an unincorporated community in Geauga County, in the U.S. state of Ohio.

== History ==
A post office called South Thompson was established in 1842, and remained in operation until 1905. Besides the post office, South Thompson had a country store.
