= Kenston Local School District =

School district in Ohio, United States

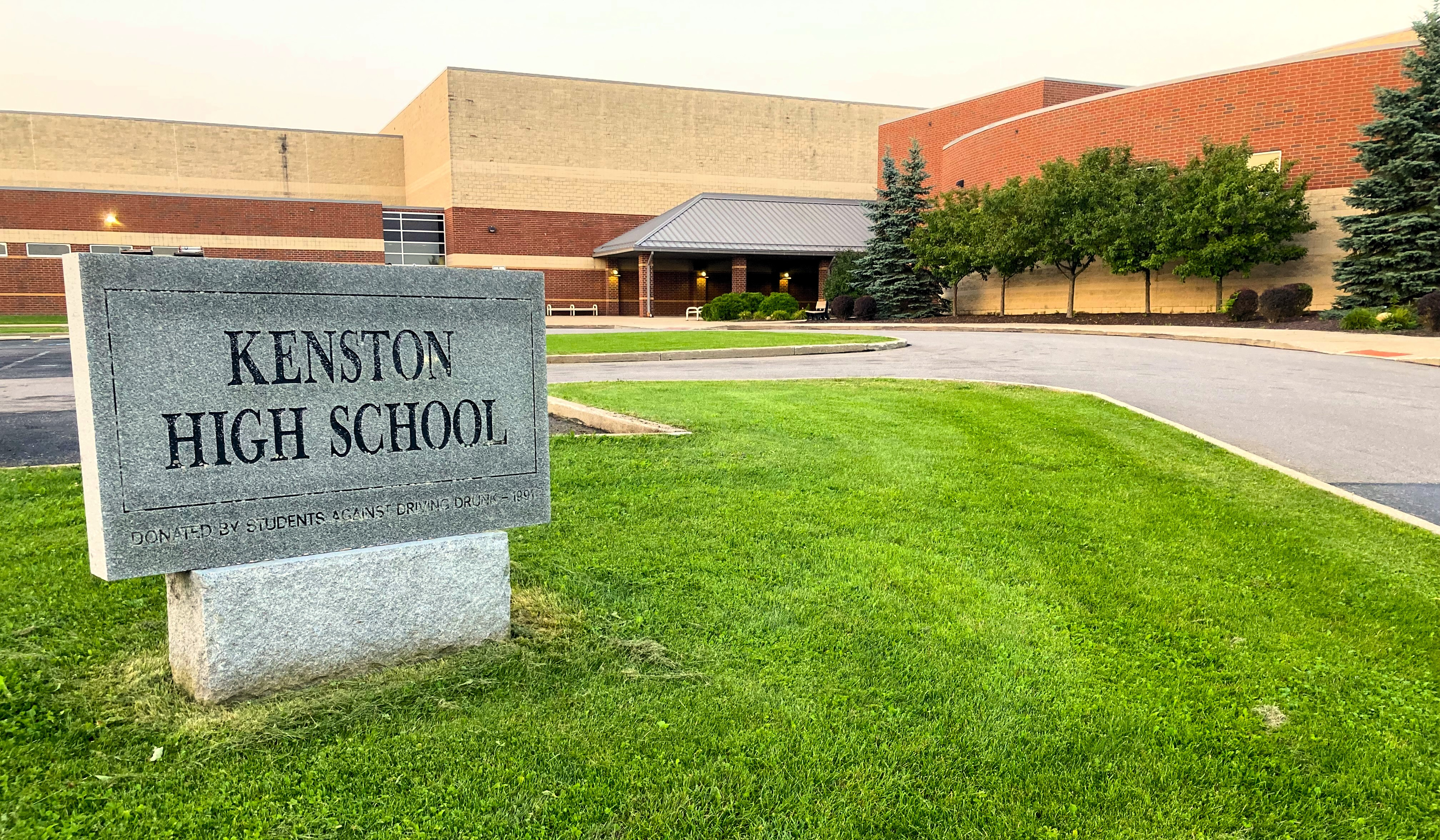
- Kenston High School sign

Address
- 17419 Snyder Rd Chagrin Falls, Ohio, 44023; United States

District information
- Type: Public
- Grades: PK–12
- NCES District ID: 3904719

Students and staff
- Enrollment: 2,524 (2024–25)
- Faculty: 150.45 (on an FTE basis)
- Student–teacher ratio: 16.78

Other information
- Website: www.kenstonlocal.org

The Kenston Local School District is a school district located in southwestern Geauga County, Ohio. The district serves students in grades PreK-12 living in Bainbridge, and Auburn townships. The district consists of one high school, one middle school and one elementary school. All school buildings and offices are located within Chagrin Falls, Ohio.

== History ==
The Kenston Local School District was formed in 1953, with the consolidation of the former Bainbridge and Auburn Local School District. Kenston High School was built in the same year.

The name Kenston originated from Kent's Town, the areas former name before townships were formed in the early 1800s. Prior to the school district settling for the name Kenston, Bainburn Local Schools were considered, a merger of the names Bainbridge and Auburn, of the consolidated school districts.

Kenston built its new high school in 2006 on Bainbridge Rd, the former high school buildings was repurposed as a middle school.

== Schools ==
=== High school ===
- Kenston High School

=== Middle school ===
- Kenston Middle School

=== Elementary school ===
- Timmons Elementary School
