= South Newbury, Ohio =

Unincorporated community in Ohio, U.S.

- Unincorporated community
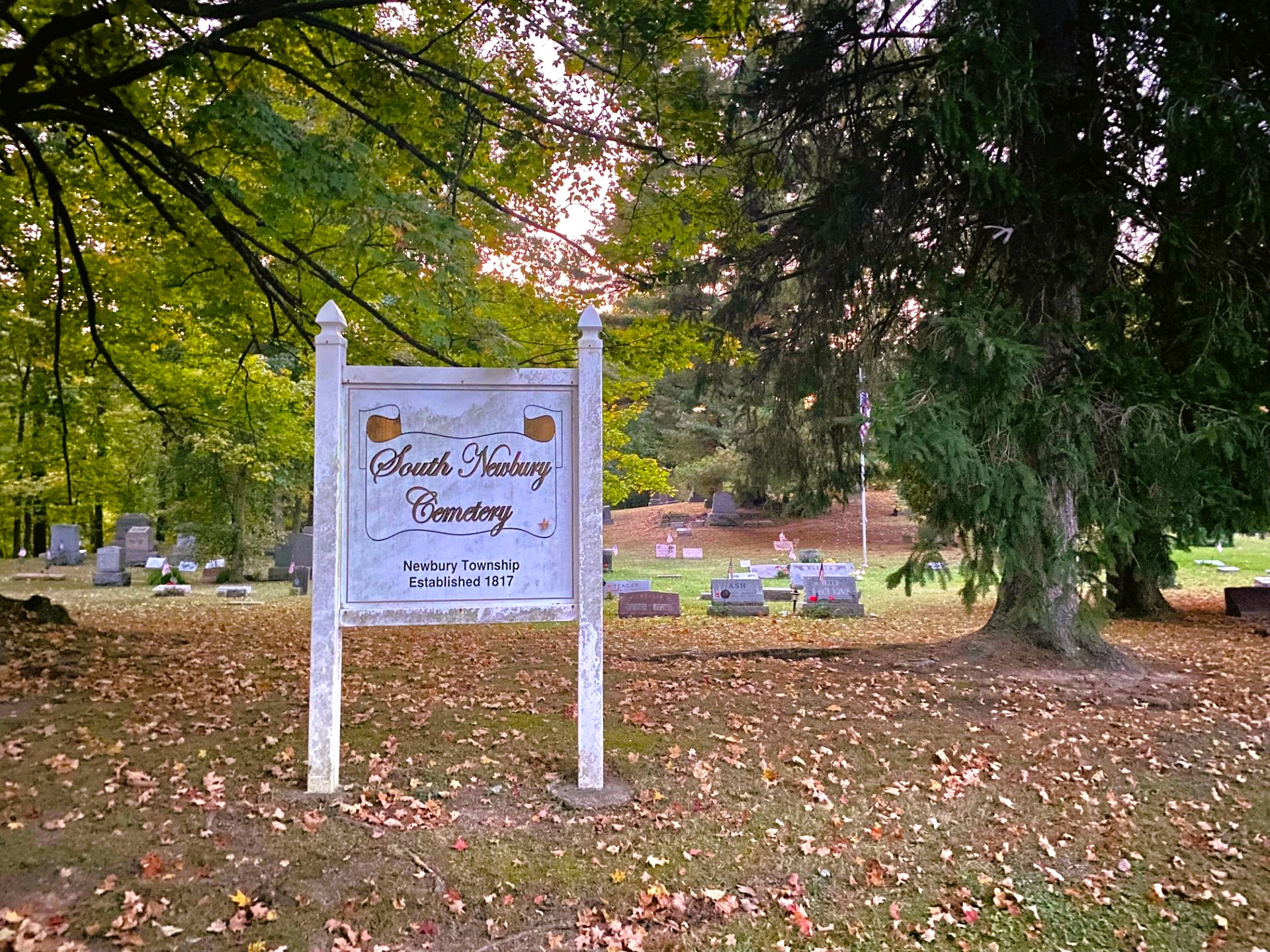

- Location within Ohio
- Coordinates: 41°26′45.28″N 81°12′35.32″W
- Country: United States
- State: Ohio
- County: Geauga
- Established: 1820

South Newbury is an unincorporated community in Geauga County, in the U.S. state of Ohio.

== History ==
One of the earliest schoolhouses in the area was built in South Newbury in 1820. A post office called South Newbury was established in 1868, and remained in operation until 1907.
