= Montville Township, Geauga County, Ohio =

Township in Ohio, US

- Township
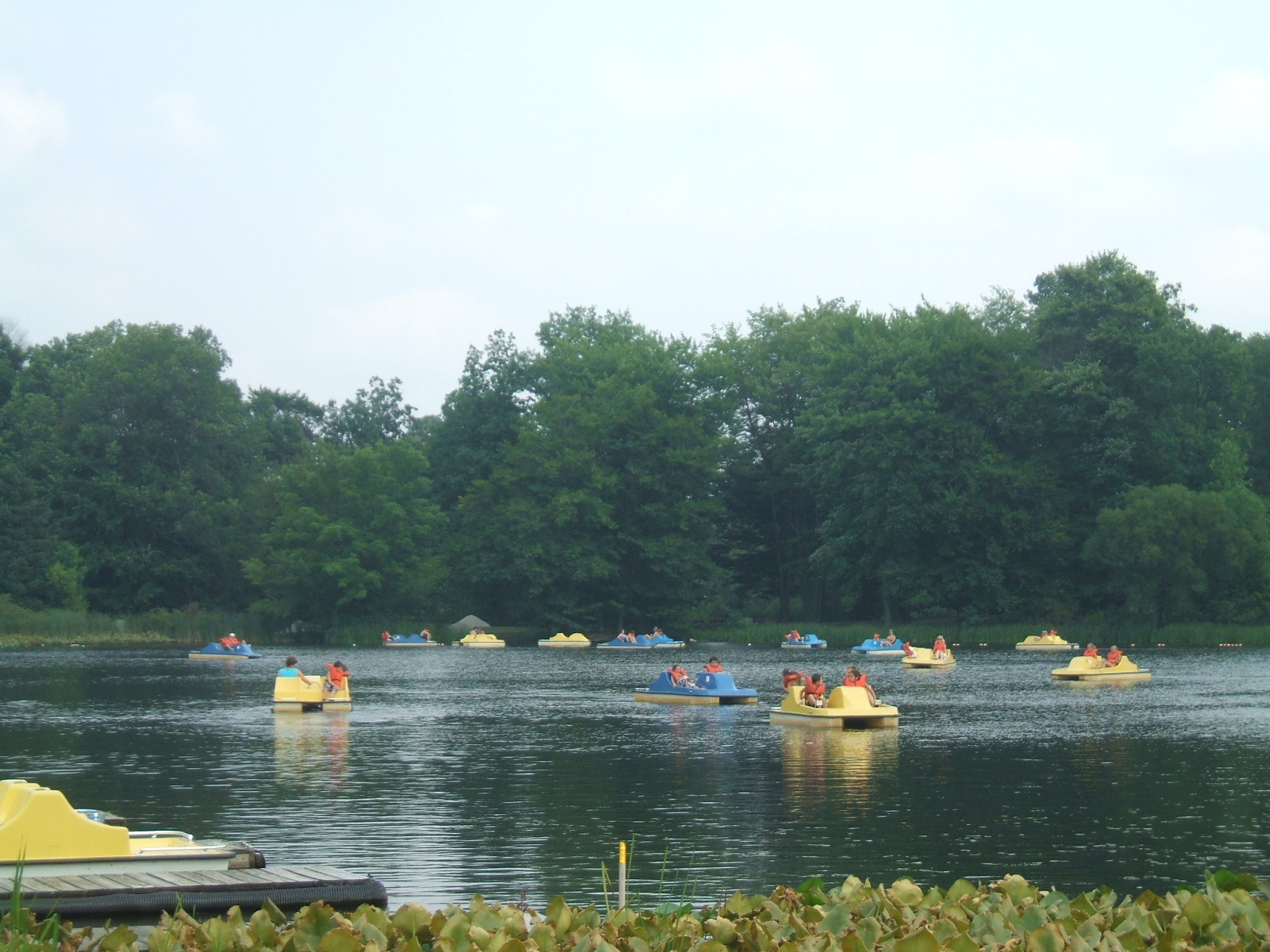
- Paddle boating at Pioneer Waterland and Dry Fun Park in Montville Township

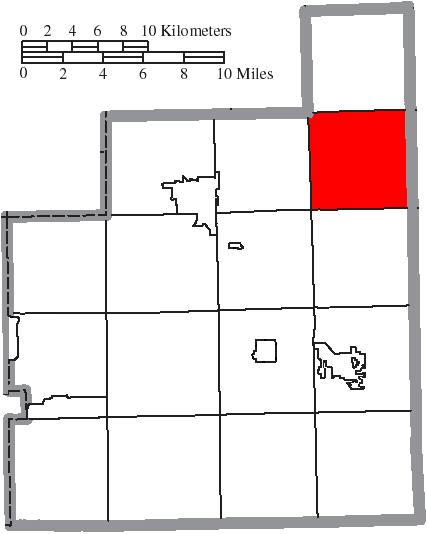
- Location of Montville Township in Geauga County
- Coordinates: 41°36′50″N 81°3′19″W
- Country: United States
- State: Ohio
- County: Geauga

Area
  - Total: 24.6 sq mi (63.8 km^{2})
  - Land: 24.2 sq mi (62.7 km^{2})
  - Water: 0.46 sq mi (1.2 km^{2})
- Elevation: 1,289 ft (393 m)

Population (2020)
  - Total: 1,938
  - Density: 82/sq mi (31.8/km^{2})
- Time zone: UTC-5 (Eastern (EST))
  - Summer (DST): UTC-4 (EDT)
- ZIP code: 44064
- Area code: 440
- FIPS code: 39-51842
- GNIS feature ID: 1086156
- Website: montvillegeauga.com

Montville Township is one of the sixteen townships of Geauga County, Ohio, United States. As of the 2020 census the population was 1,938.

== Geography ==
Located in the northeastern part of the county, it borders the following townships:

- Thompson Township - north
- Trumbull Township, Ashtabula County - northeast corner
- Hartsgrove Township, Ashtabula County - east
- Windsor Township, Ashtabula County - southeast corner
- Huntsburg Township - south
- Claridon Township - southwest corner
- Hambden Township - west
- LeRoy Township, Lake County - northwest corner.

No municipalities are located in Montville Township, although the unincorporated community of Montville lies at the center of the township.

The Cuyahoga River begins in Montville Township.

== Name and history ==
Statewide, the only other Montville Township is located in Medina County.

The township includes a house that was once a stop on the Underground Railroad. The house still stands on the southeast corner of the intersection of U.S. Route 6 and State Route 528.

== Government ==
The township is governed by a three-member board of trustees, who are elected in November of odd-numbered years to a four-year term beginning on the following January 1. Two are elected in the year after the presidential election and one is elected in the year before it. There is also an elected township fiscal officer, who serves a four-year term beginning on April 1 of the year after the election, which is held in November of the year before the presidential election. Vacancies in the fiscal officership or on the board of trustees are filled by the remaining trustees.

== Education ==
Montville Township formerly fell under the Ledgemont School District but was absorbed by the Berkshire Local School District in Burton.
