= Munson Township, Geauga County, Ohio =

Township in Ohio, US

- Township
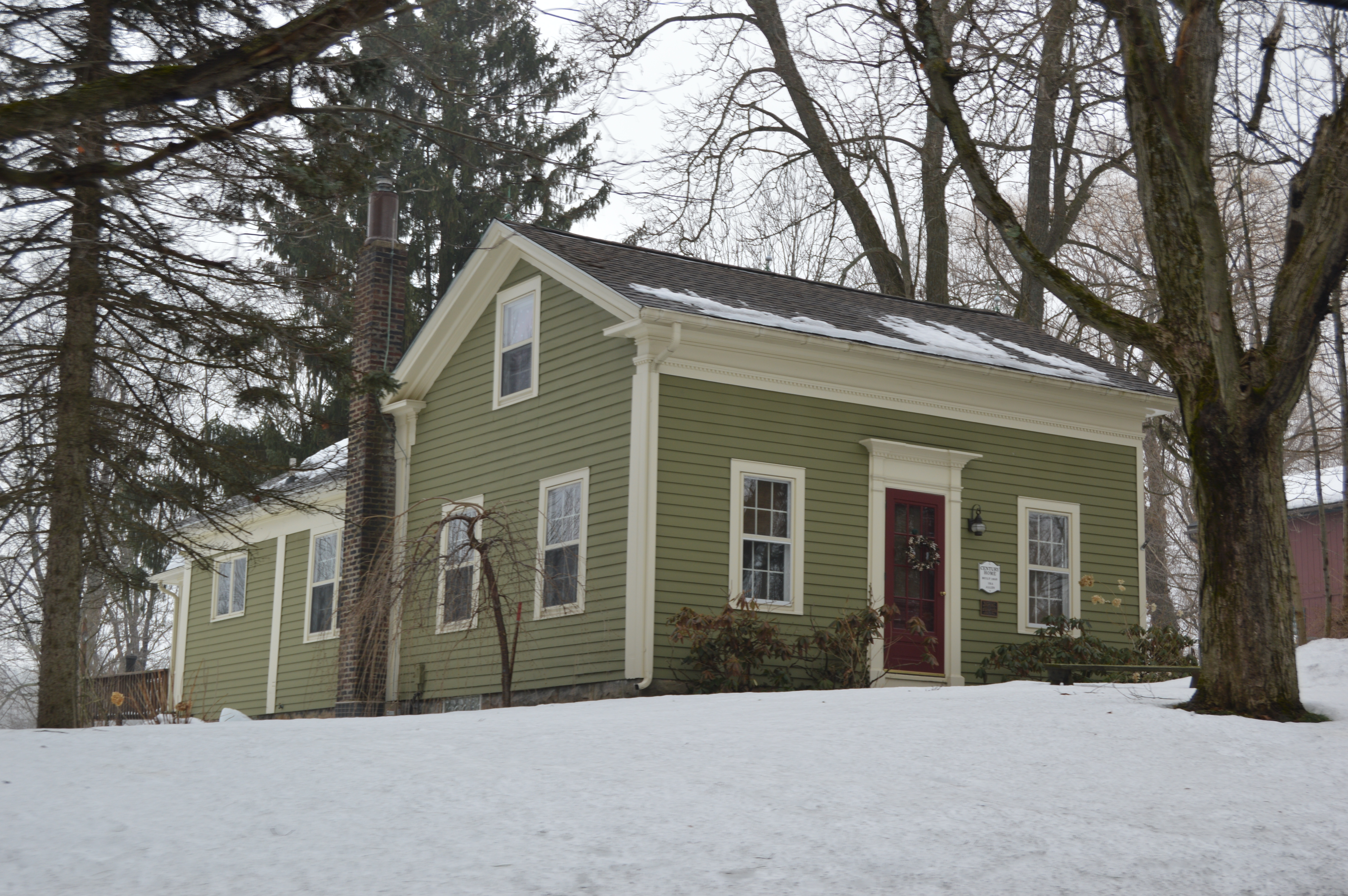
- House at Fowler's Mills

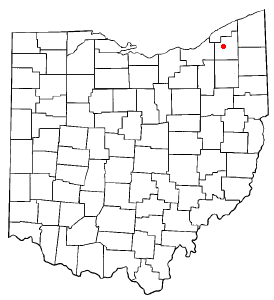
- Location of Munson Township in Geauga County
- Coordinates: 41°32′7″N 81°14′23″W
- Country: United States
- State: Ohio
- County: Geauga

Area
  - Total: 25.8 sq mi (66.9 km^{2})
  - Land: 25.2 sq mi (65.3 km^{2})
  - Water: 0.62 sq mi (1.6 km^{2})
- Elevation: 1,211 ft (369 m)

Population (2020)
  - Total: 7,087
  - Density: 262/sq mi (101.2/km^{2})
- Time zone: UTC-5 (Eastern (EST))
  - Summer (DST): UTC-4 (EDT)
- FIPS code: 39-53340
- GNIS feature ID: 1086157
- Website: www.munsontwpoh.gov

Munson Township is one of the sixteen townships of Geauga County, Ohio, United States. As of the 2020 census the population was 7,087.

== Geography ==
Located in the north central part of the county, it borders the following townships and city:

- Chardon Township - north
- Hambden Township - northeast corner
- Claridon Township - east
- Burton Township - southeast corner
- Newbury Township - south
- Russell Township - southwest corner
- Chester Township - west
- Kirtland - northwest corner

Part of the city of Chardon, the county seat of Geauga County, is located in northeastern Munson Township. The census-designated place of Bass Lake is in the northeast part of the township, adjacent to Chardon.

Munson Township is home to Alpine Valley, one of the few skiing locations in Ohio. The township is also home to four parks: Munson Township Park, Nero Nature Preserve, Town Hall Park and Scenic River Retreat.

== Name and history ==
Munson Township was formed from the Connecticut Western Reserve. It is township eight, range eight on the map of the Western Reserve.

Munson was founded in 1816. Many 19th-century buildings are restored and are used as private residences and small businesses.

== Government ==
The township is governed by a three-member board of trustees, who are elected in November of odd-numbered years to a four-year term beginning on the following January 1. Two are elected in the year after the presidential election and one is elected in the year before it. There is also an elected township fiscal officer, who serves a four-year term beginning on April 1 of the year after the election, which is held in November of the year before the presidential election. Vacancies in the fiscal officership or on the board of trustees are filled by the remaining trustees.

== Transportation ==
Munson Township is traversed by the following Ohio state and U.S. highways:

- - U.S. Route 322
- - State Route 44

== Notable people ==
- John Eklund, Ohio state senator
