= Bainbridge (CDP), Ohio =

Bainbridge
- Census-designated place
- Interactive map of Bainbridge
- Coordinates: 41°23′08″N 81°20′52″W
- Country: United States
- State: Ohio
- County: Geauga
- Township: Bainbridge

Area
  - Total: 12.66 sq mi (32.79 km^{2})
  - Land: 12.50 sq mi (32.38 km^{2})
  - Water: 0.16 sq mi (0.41 km^{2})
- Elevation: 1,139 ft (347 m)

Population (2020)
  - Total: 9,242
  - Density: 739.2/sq mi (285.42/km^{2})
- Time zone: UTC-5 (Eastern (EST))
  - Summer (DST): UTC-4 (EDT)
- FIPS code: 39-03585
- GNIS feature ID: 2393325
- Website: www.bainbridgetwp.com

Bainbridge is a census-designated place (CDP) in Bainbridge Township, Geauga County, Ohio, United States. As of the 2020 census, the CDP had a population of 9,242.

== History ==
A variant name of Bainbridge was "Bissells". A post office called "Bissels" was established in 1826, and remained in operation until 1906. Bainbridge derives its name from the naval hero of the War of 1812, Commodore William Bainbridge.

== Geography ==
Bainbridge is located in southwestern Geauga County at the center of Bainbridge Township. U.S. Route 422, a four-lane expressway, passes through the center of the CDP, leading east 31 miles (50 km) to Warren and west 25 miles (40 km) to downtown Cleveland. Access to US 422 is from Ohio State Route 306 in the center of Bainbridge; 306 leads north 9 miles (14 km) to Chesterland and south 5 miles (8 km) to Aurora.

According to the United States Census Bureau, the Bainbridge CDP has a total area of 3.5 square miles (9.0 km^{2}), of which 3.4 square miles (8.8 km^{2}) is land and 0.077 square miles (0.2 km^{2}), or 2.09%, is water.

== Demographics ==
Historical population
Census	Pop.	Note	%±
2020	9,242		—
U.S. Decennial Census

As of the census of 2000, there were 3,417 people, 1,261 households, and 978 families residing in the CDP. The population density was 1,013.5 inhabitants per square mile (391.3/km^{2}). There were 1,301 housing units at an average density of 385.9 per square mile (149.0/km^{2}). The racial makeup of the CDP was 97.25% White, 0.73% African American, 0.09% Native American, 0.70% Asian, 0.32% from other races, and 0.91% from two or more races. Hispanic or Latino of any race were 0.61% of the population.

There were 1,261 households, out of which 38.2% had children under the age of 18 living with them, 67.6% were married couples living together, 7.5% had a female householder with no husband present, and 22.4% were non-families. 20.0% of all households were made up of individuals, and 7.5% had someone living alone who was 65 years of age or older. The average household size was 2.70 and the average family size was 3.12.

In the CDP, the population was spread out, with 28.1% under the age of 18, 4.3% from 18 to 24, 24.5% from 25 to 44, 30.1% from 45 to 64, and 13.0% who were 65 years of age or older. The median age was 41 years. For every 100 females, there were 92.2 males. For every 100 females age 18 and over, there were 88.6 males.

The median income for a household in the CDP was $87,888, and the median income for a family was $96,803. Males had a median income of $67,188 versus $38,469 for females. The per capita income for the CDP was $38,229. About 1.7% of families and 2.1% of the population were below the poverty line, including none of those under age 18 and 9.6% of those age 65 or over.

== Education ==
The Kenston School District is the primary education for Bainbridge residents. Schools include:

- Timmons Elementary School (Grades Kindergarten-4)
- Kenston Middle School (Grades 5-7)
- Kenston High School (Grades 8-12)

Bainbridge has a branch of the Geauga County Public Library.

== Notable person ==
- Louis Rothkopf, businessman, Prohibition bootlegger
