= Hambden Township, Geauga County, Ohio =

Township in Ohio, US

- Township
- Motto: "The Community That Comes Together"
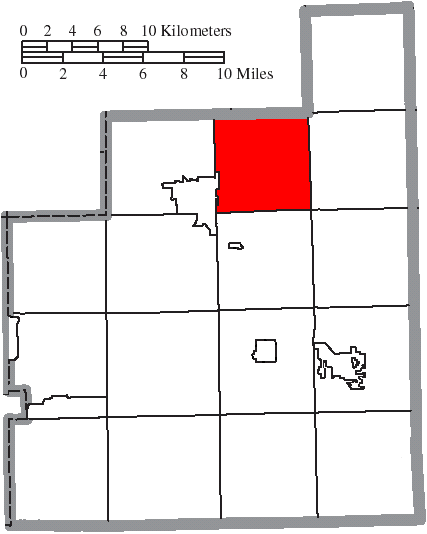
- Location of Hambden Township in Geauga County
- Coordinates: 41°36′14″N 81°9′19″W
- Country: United States
- State: Ohio
- County: Geauga

Area
  - Total: 22.5 sq mi (58.2 km^{2})
  - Land: 22.3 sq mi (57.7 km^{2})
  - Water: 0.23 sq mi (0.6 km^{2})
- Elevation: 1,302 ft (397 m)

Population (2020)
  - Total: 4,676
  - Density: 209/sq mi (80.8/km^{2})
- Time zone: UTC-5 (Eastern (EST))
  - Summer (DST): UTC-4 (EDT)
- FIPS code: 39-32914
- GNIS feature ID: 1086153
- Website: www.hambdentownship.com

Hambden Township is one of the sixteen townships of Geauga County, Ohio, United States. As of the 2020 census the population was 4,676, up from 4,024 at the 2000 census.

== Geography ==
Located in the northern part of the county, it borders the following townships:

- LeRoy Township, Lake County - north
- Thompson Township - northeast corner
- Montville Township - east
- Huntsburg Township - southeast corner
- Claridon Township - south
- Munson Township - southwest corner
- Chardon Township - west
- Concord Township, Lake County - northwest

A small part of the city of Chardon, the county seat of Geauga County, borders southwestern Hambden Township. The unincorporated settlement of Hambden is located in the center, at the intersection of U.S. Route 6 and State Route 608.

== Name and history ==
Founded in 1801 by Dr. Solomon Bond, for whom it was originally named, it is the only Hambden Township statewide.

== Government ==
The township is governed by a three-member board of trustees, who are elected in November of odd-numbered years to a four-year term beginning on the following January 1. Two are elected in the year after the presidential election and one is elected in the year before it. There is also an elected township fiscal officer, who serves a four-year term beginning on April 1 of the year after the election, which is held in November of the year before the presidential election. Vacancies in the fiscal officership or on the board of trustees are filled by the remaining trustees.
