= Newbury Township, Geauga County, Ohio =

Township in Ohio, US

Newbury Township
- Township
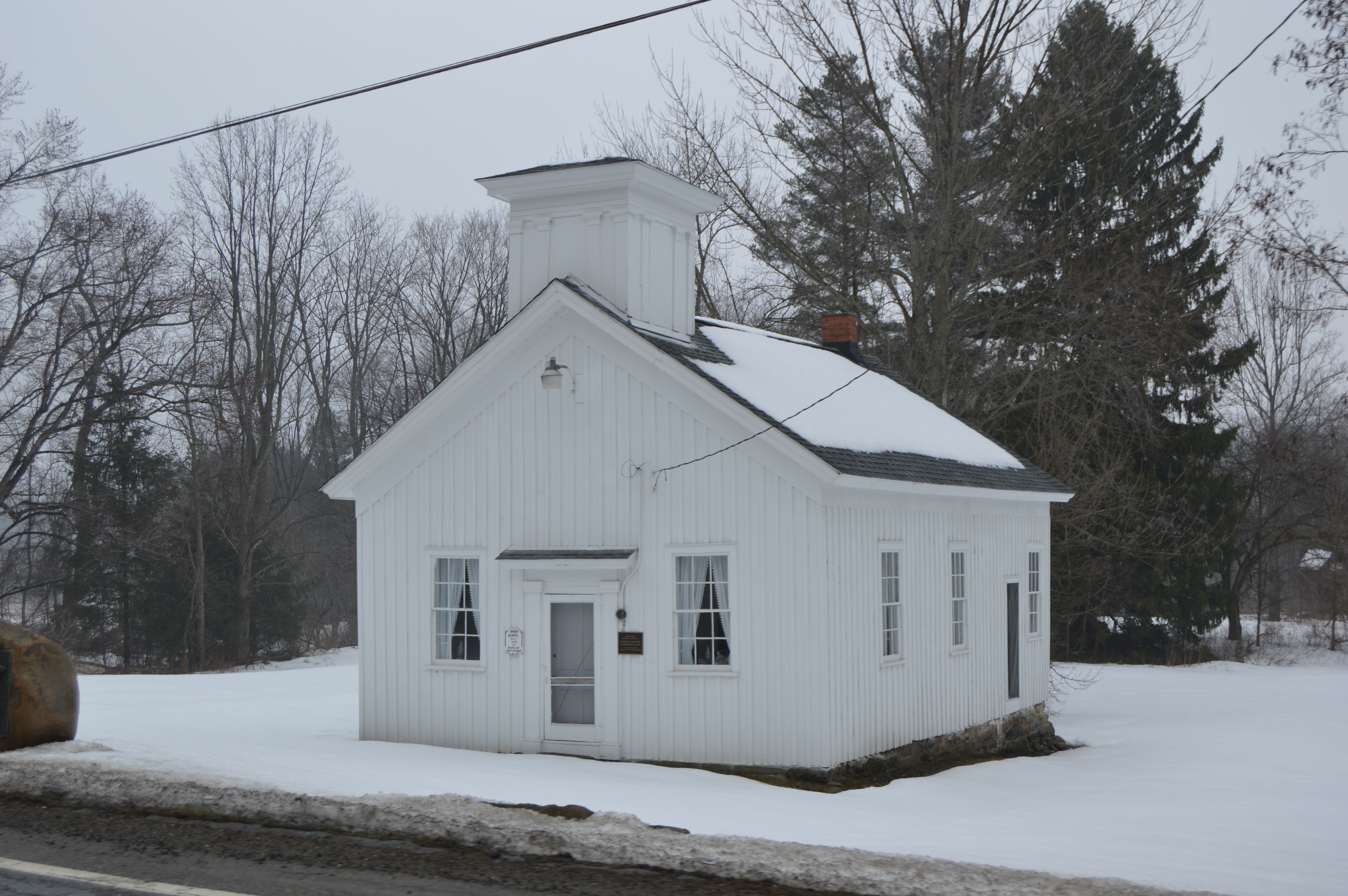
- South Newbury Union Chapel

- Flag

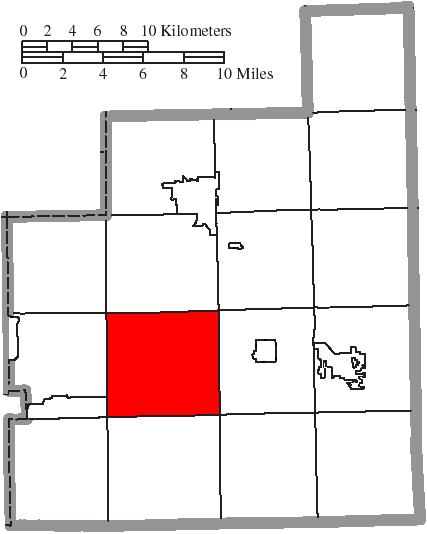
- Location of Newbury Township in Geauga County
- Coordinates: 41°27′54″N 81°13′59″W
- Country: United States
- State: Ohio
- County: Geauga

Area
  - Total: 28.6 sq mi (74.1 km^{2})
  - Land: 27.7 sq mi (71.8 km^{2})
  - Water: 0.89 sq mi (2.3 km^{2})
- Elevation: 1,240 ft (378 m)

Population (2020)
  - Total: 5,244
  - Density: 200/sq mi (77.2/km^{2})
- Time zone: UTC-5 (Eastern (EST))
  - Summer (DST): UTC-4 (EDT)
- ZIP code: 44065
- Area code: 440
- FIPS code: 39-54292
- GNIS feature ID: 1086158
- Website: www.newburyohio.com

Newbury Township is one of the sixteen townships of Geauga County, Ohio, United States. As of the 2020 census the population was 5,244, down from 5,537 at the 2010 census and 5,805 at the 2000 census.

Punderson State Park is located in Newbury Township.

== Geography ==
Located in the central part of the county, it borders the following townships:

- Munson Township – north
- Claridon Township – northeast corner
- Burton Township – east
- Troy Township – southeast corner
- Auburn Township – south
- Bainbridge Township – southwest corner
- Russell Township – west
- Chester Township – northwest corner

No municipalities are located in Newbury Township.

== Schools ==
Since 2020, Newbury Township has been part of the West Geauga Local School District, which includes West Geauga High School, after executing a territory transfer at the end of the 2019-20 academic year. Prior to that, Newbury Local School District was the last school district in Geauga County to cover only one township. Prior to that, the only townships operating their own schools were Claridon, Troy, and Burton townships, who joined in 1968 to form Berkshire High School. Newbury High School was located just north of Newbury Center and was razed in 2022.

== Name and History ==
The first known human inhabitants of the Township were the Seneca people, who lived in Newbury until they were forcibly removed to Indian Territory in Oklahoma in the 1830s. Newbury Township was part of the Connecticut Western Reserve until 1786, making it part of the State of Connecticut for a period of time.

The name "Newbury" likely came from a town in England or Newburyport, Massachusetts. It is the only Newbury Township statewide.

For a detailed history of the township, including its landmarks, see the Mini-History of Newbury

== Government ==
The township is governed by a 3-member board of trustees, who are elected in November of odd-numbered years to a four-year term beginning on the following January 1. Two are elected in the year after the presidential election and one is elected in the year before it. There is also an elected township fiscal officer, who serves a four-year term beginning on April 1 of the year after the election, which is held in November of the year before the presidential election. Vacancies in the fiscal officership or on the board of trustees are filled by the remaining trustees.
