= Chardon Township, Ohio =

Township in Ohio, US

Chardon Township, Geauga County, Ohio
- Township
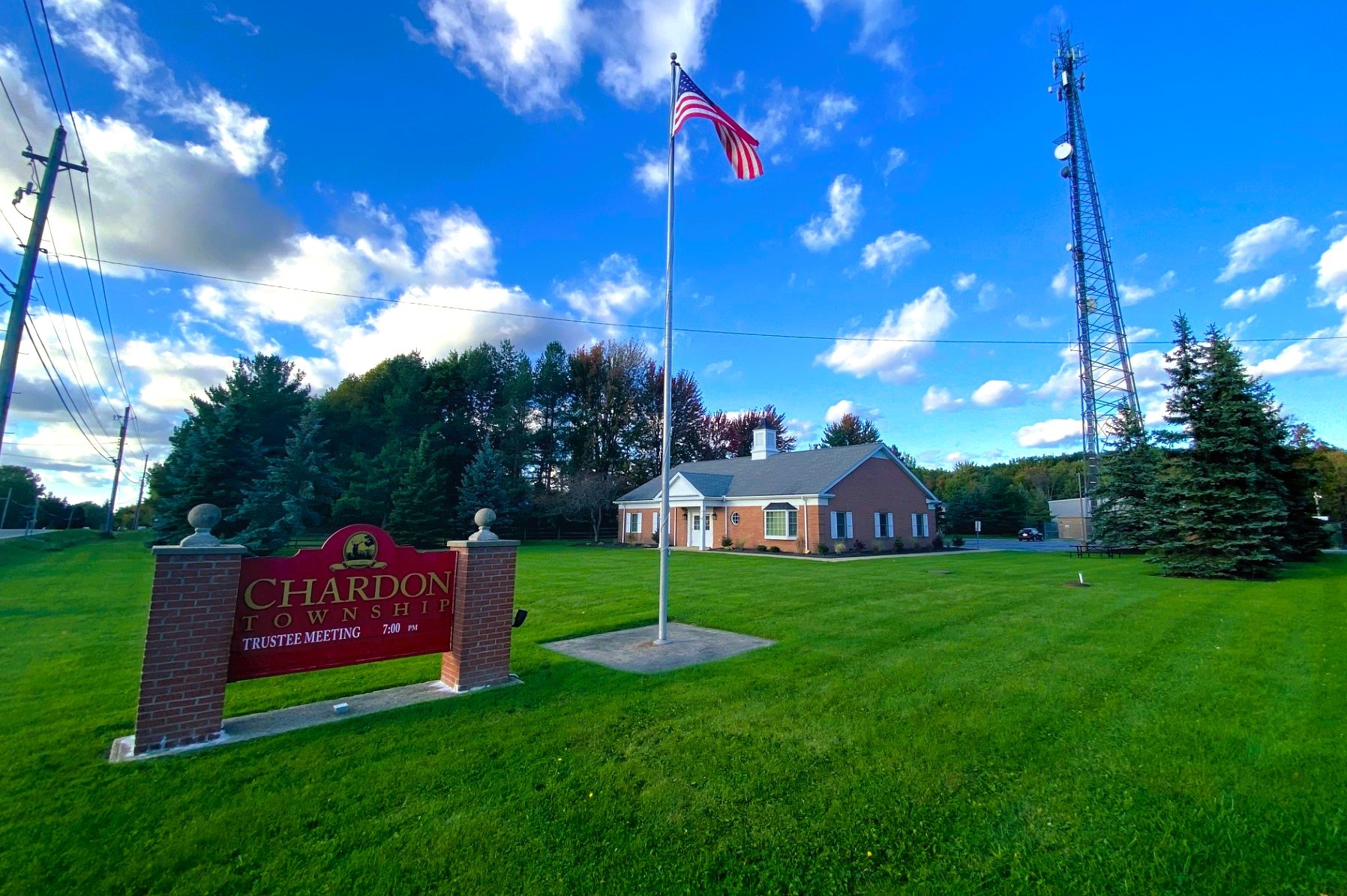
- Town Hall

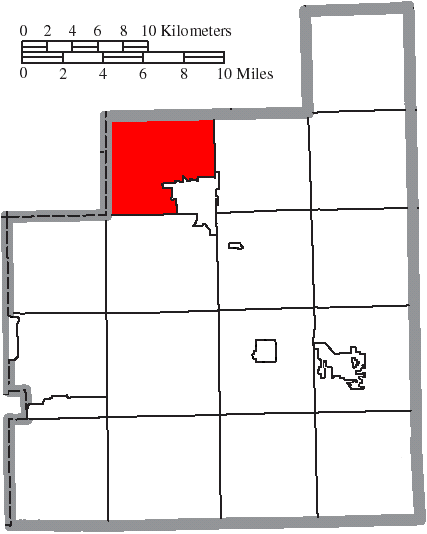
- Location of Chardon Township in Geauga County
- Coordinates: 41°37′8″N 81°15′3″W
- Country: United States
- State: Ohio
- County: Geauga

Area
  - Total: 22.8 sq mi (59.1 km^{2})
  - Land: 22.7 sq mi (58.7 km^{2})
  - Water: 0.12 sq mi (0.3 km^{2})
- Elevation: 1,289 ft (393 m)

Population (2020)
  - Total: 4,494
  - Density: 198/sq mi (76.6/km^{2})
- Time zone: UTC-5 (Eastern (EST))
  - Summer (DST): UTC-4 (EDT)
- ZIP code: 44024
- Area code: 440
- FIPS code: 39-13561
- GNIS feature ID: 1086150
- Website: Township website

Chardon Township is one of the sixteen townships of Geauga County, Ohio, United States. As of the 2020 census the population was 4,494.

== Geography ==
Located in the northern part of the county, it borders the following townships and municipalities:

- Concord Township, Lake County - north
- Hambden Township - east
- Chardon - southeast
- Munson Township - south
- Chester Township - southwest corner
- Kirtland - west
- Kirtland Hills - northwest

Chardon, the county seat of Geauga County, borders Chardon Township on the southeast.

== Name and history ==
It is the only Chardon Township statewide.

== Government ==
The township is governed by a three-member board of trustees, who are elected in November of odd-numbered years to a four-year term beginning on the following January 1. Two are elected in the year after the presidential election and one is elected in the year before it. There is also an elected township fiscal officer, who serves a four-year term beginning on April 1 of the year after the election, which is held in November of the year before the presidential election. Vacancies in the fiscal officership or on the board of trustees are filled by the remaining trustees.

== Notable residents ==
- Joe Jurevicius, wide receiver for the Cleveland Browns
- Ettore Boiardi, better known as Chef Boyardee
