= National Register of Historic Places listings in Geauga County, Ohio =

Location of Geauga County in Ohio

This is a list of the National Register of Historic Places listings in Geauga County, Ohio.

This is intended to be a complete list of the properties and districts on the National Register of Historic Places in Geauga County, Ohio, United States. The locations of National Register properties and districts for which the latitude and longitude coordinates are included below, may be seen in a Google map.

There are 18 properties and districts listed on the National Register in the county.

This National Park Service list is complete through NPS recent listings posted March 13, 2026.

== Current listings ==
	Name on the Register	Image	Date listed	Location	City or town	Description
1	ASM Headquarters and Geodesic Dome	ASM Headquarters and Geodesic Dome	October 22, 2009 (#09000849)	9639 Kinsman Rd. 41°27′36″N 81°17′56″W	Russell Township	
2	Batavia House	Batavia House	July 16, 1987 (#87001213)	14979 S. State St. 41°27′39″N 81°04′22″W	Middlefield	
3	Burton Village Historic District	Burton Village Historic District	November 20, 1974 (#74001501)	Surrounding Public Sq. 41°28′22″N 81°08′42″W	Burton	
4	Chardon Courthouse Square District	Chardon Courthouse Square District	October 18, 1974 (#74001502)	Public green, roughly bounded by Main and Center Sts. 41°34′56″N 81°12′14″W	Chardon	
5	Chardon Post Office Building	Chardon Post Office Building	February 28, 2008 (#08000114)	121 South St. 41°34′51″N 81°12′12″W	Chardon	
6	Chester Township District School No. 2	Chester Township District School No. 2	November 4, 1982 (#82001463)	7798 Mayfield Rd., west of Chesterland; 41°31′22″N 81°21′46″W	Chester Township	
7	Claridon Congregational Church	Claridon Congregational Church	August 13, 1974 (#74001503)	U.S. Route 322; 41°31′37″N 81°08′35″W	Claridon Township	
8	Domestic Arts Hall And Flower Hall	Domestic Arts Hall And Flower Hall	August 24, 1979 (#79001846)	N. Cheshire St. 41°28′37″N 81°08′40″W	Burton	
9	Fowler's Mills Historic District	Fowler's Mills Historic District	January 29, 2002 (#01001522)	10743-10779, 10750 Mayfield Rd.; 12426-12533 Fowlers Mill Rd., southwest of Chardon; 41°31′41″N 81°15′22″W	Munson Township	
10	Fox-Pope Farm	Fox-Pope Farm	August 12, 1992 (#92000971)	17767 Rapids Rd., west of Welshfield; 41°23′12″N 81°10′17″W	Troy Township	
11	Free Will Baptist Church of Auburn	Free Will Baptist Church of Auburn	May 28, 1976 (#76001430)	11742 E. Washington St. 41°23′15″N 81°13′08″W	Auburn Township	
12	Dr. Erastus Goodwin House	Dr. Erastus Goodwin House	August 1, 1975 (#75001406)	14485 Main St. 41°28′28″N 81°08′41″W	Burton	
13	Lot Hathaway House	Lot Hathaway House	October 16, 1974 (#74001504)	12236 Old State Rd., north of East Claridon; 41°32′08″N 81°07′04″W	Claridon Township	
14	Lost Lane Farm	Lost Lane Farm	August 30, 1984 (#84003693)	18173 Geauga Lake Rd. 41°22′21″N 81°21′57″W	Bainbridge Township	Associated with Louis Rorimer; also known as Snake Hill Farm
15	Pebblebrook Farm House and Gardens	Pebblebrook Farm House and Gardens	February 4, 2011 (#10001212)	12525 Heath Rd., east of Chesterland; 41°31′45″N 81°17′38″W	Munson Township	
16	South Newbury Union Chapel	South Newbury Union Chapel	February 15, 2012 (#12000033)	15829 Ravenna Rd. 41°26′17″N 81°12′27″W	Newbury Township	Related to women's suffrage in Ohio
17	Lucius T. Tambling House	Lucius T. Tambling House	March 15, 1984 (#84003695)	14025 Chillicothe Rd. at Novelty; 41°29′08″N 81°20′21″W	Russell Township	
18	Walter C. White Estate	Walter C. White Estate	October 8, 1976 (#76001431)	East of Mayfield Heights at U.S. Route 322 and County Line Rd. 41°31′35″N 81°23′14″W	Chester Township	

== See also ==
- List of National Historic Landmarks in Ohio
- Listings in neighboring counties: Ashtabula, Cuyahoga, Lake, Portage, Summit, Trumbull
- National Register of Historic Places listings in Ohio
