= Hathaway =

Hathaway may refer to:

== Commerce ==
- Hathaway Manufacturing Company, a predecessor of Berkshire Hathaway, an investment vehicle
- Berkshire Hathaway, a holding company
- A brand of dress shirts, formerly made by the C. F. Hathaway Company in Waterville, Maine

== Places ==
- Hathaway (Tannersville, New York), listed on the NRHP in Greene County, New York
- Hathaway, Louisiana
- Hathaway, West Virginia
- Hathaway Academy, Grays, Essex, England

== Other uses ==
- Hathaway (surname), including a list of people with the name
- Hathaw9y, South Korean indie band

== See also ==
- Hathaway House (disambiguation)
