= Hathaway House =

Hathaway House may refer to:

- Hathaway Barn, Willimantic, Maine, listed on the National Register of Historic Places in Piscataquis County, Maine
- James D. Hathaway House, Fall River, Massachusetts, listed on the NRHP in Bristol County, Massachusetts
- Hathaway Tenement, North Adams, Massachusetts, listed on the NRHP in Berkshire County, Massachusetts
- David Carpenter House, currently known as the Hathaway House in Blissfield, Michigan
- Hathaway Cottage, Saranac Lake, New York, listed on the NRHP in Franklin County, New York
- Hathaway (Tannersville, New York), listed on the NRHP in Greene County, New York
- Lot Hathaway House, East Claridon, Ohio, listed on the NRHP in Geauga County, Ohio
- Hathaway's Tavern, St. Albans, Vermont, listed on the NRHP in Franklin County, Vermont
