= Lot Hathaway House =

- U.S. National Register of Historic Places
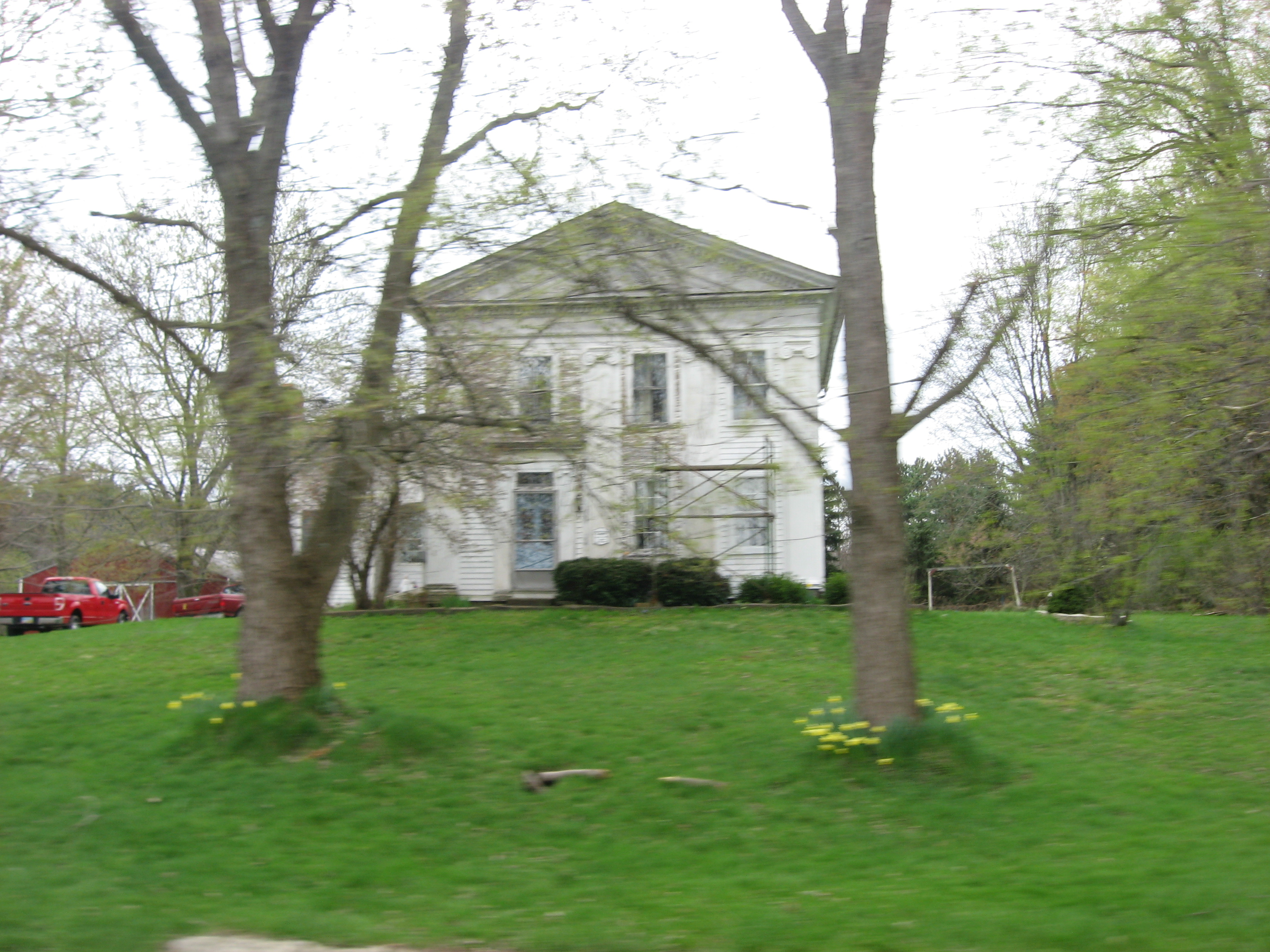
- Front of the house, seen from Old State Road

- Location within Ohio Location within the United States
- Location: 12236 Old State Rd., East Claridon, Ohio
- Coordinates: 41°32′16.5″N 81°7′4″W
- Area: Less than 1 acre (0.40 ha)
- Built: 1828
- Architectural style: Greek Revival, Adam
- NRHP reference No.: 74001504
- Added to NRHP: October 16, 1974

The Lot Hathaway House is a historic residence near East Claridon in the Connecticut Western Reserve region of the U.S. state of Ohio. Constructed in the early nineteenth century for a transplanted New Englander, the house mixes two of the period's prominent architectural styles, and it has been named a historic site.

== Lot Hathaway ==
A native of Freetown, Massachusetts, Lot Hathaway performed military service in the War of 1812 before settling north of East Claridon in 1816. Once a seaman, he had formerly sailed both on coasters and on European trading vessels. He was unmarried when he settled in Geauga County, but soon afterward married pioneer settler Orpha Bushnell. Hathaway was active in the temperance movement and in the causes of the Democratic Party. The traditional date for the construction of his present house is 1828, although its architectural style suggests construction in the first half of the 1830s. It succeeded an earlier residence, which had been destroyed by fire.

== House ==
Built in the Greek Revival style with Adam style influences, the house is a weatherboarded structure, two stories tall, with a broad pediment that extends the width of the house. Entrances are located on the left sides of both the front and the side, which are divided into three and four bays respectively. Among the clearest of the Adam details are the numerous dentils on the pediment, while the Greek Revival remains prominent through elements such as the fluting on both the Ionic-style capitals and the pilasters.

== Preservation ==
In 1974, the Lot Hathaway House was listed on the National Register of Historic Places; it was the county's second site to be given this distinction, following only the Claridon Congregational Church, although the courthouse square in Chardon was given a similar distinction just two days later. Hathway's house qualified for designation because of its architecture, due to its place as one of the area's best Greek Revival houses.
