= Geauga County Maple Festival =

Fair celebrating maple soup production in the US

- Status: active
- Genre: food festivals
- Venue: Chardon Courthouse Square District
- Location: Chardon, Ohio
- Years active: 99–100
- Inaugurated: 1926
- Website: Geauga County Maple Festival

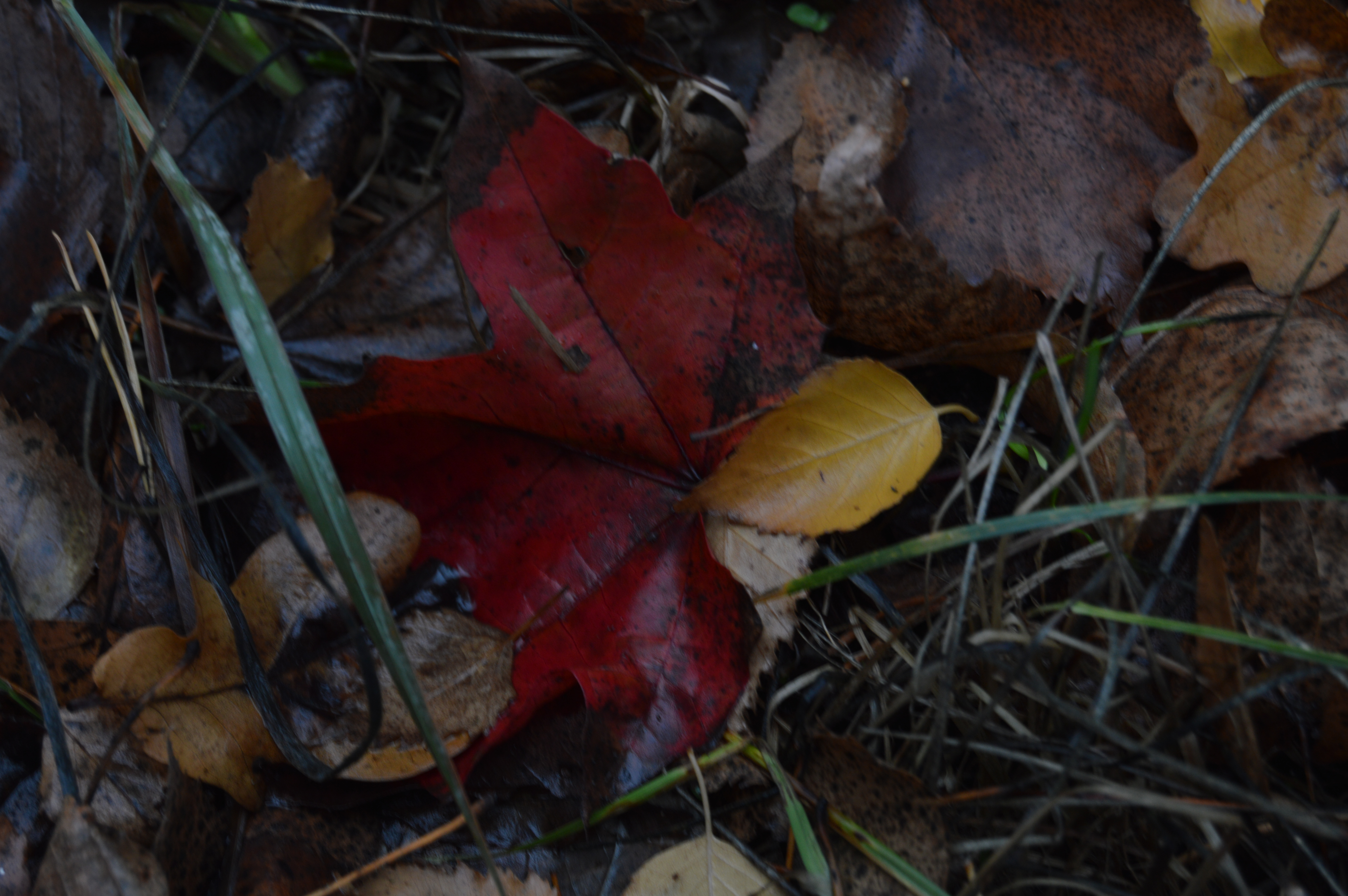
Maple leaf

The Geauga County Maple Festival is a fair celebrating the production of maple syrup. It is the oldest maple festival in the United States, and one of the largest. The fair takes place in Chardon, Ohio in the Chardon Courthouse Square District. Chardon is located in northeast Ohio, about 35 miles east of Cleveland. The festival was founded in 1926 in an attempt to market Ohio syrup in competition with Vermont syrup.

This festival went on hiatus in 1942–45 & 2020-21.

== Dates ==
The Maple Festival is held annually on the last full weekend in April. However, several times it has been postponed until the first weekend in May due to heavy snowfall in the Chardon area. The festival hours are:

- Thursday: 12:00 pm – 10:00 pm
- Friday: 10:00 am – 11:00 pm
- Saturday: 10:00 am – 11:00 pm
- Sunday: 11:00 am – 7:00 pm

The festival's address is:

Historic Chardon Square, Route 6 and Route 44, Chardon, Ohio 44024

== Tappin' Sunday ==
Maple syrup is typically made from the sap of maple trees such as the sugar maple, the red maple and the black maple. Maple trees are plentiful in the Chardon area, and several trees are located on the Chardon Square where the festival takes place. The celebration of maple syrup begins on Tappin' Sunday, which occurs on the second Sunday in March. This includes the tapping of all the maple trees on Chardon Square to make syrup for the festival. The sap collected is then taken to the Chardon Square sugar house where it is turned into maple syrup stirs for customers to enjoy.

== Events ==
- Bathtub races is a competitive event that has a men's bracket and a women's bracket. Each team may include no more than five people: one driver inside the tub and four pushers. Only two people are allowed to push at one time. Contestants steer and push the bathtub 250 feet down Main Street in Chardon Square around a turn-around point and back.
- Battle of the bands started in 1965 as a way to display local talent. The first winners were a group of young boys calling themselves The Trolls.
- Eating competitions involve competitions to consume the most food, including a pancake eating contest and a pizza eating contest.
- The lumberjack competition includes a series of events such as axe throwing, bow sawing, block chopping, and a Jack and Jill style cut. Both men and women can participate in all of these events. The Jack and Jill race involves one man and one woman on each team competing to see who can saw through a piece of wood the fastest.
- The parade usually takes place on the last two days of the fair. It showcases local companies, city officials and other city groups. The Chardon High School dance team and cheerleaders participate, as do the king and queen of the festival. The square is shut down during this time, and most of the rides are not in operation. Spectators line the streets of the square while those participating throw candy and other goodies to the crowd. Each group has a float or vehicle that is judged, and a parade winner is chosen.
- The Sap Run consists of two races, a one-mile race and a five-mile race. This race begins on Chardon Square and continues through parts of the city of Chardon.
- The syrup contest is the main event of the festival. People come from all around the area to put their syrup on display. Participants tap their own trees and make the syrup in their sugar shacks. Contestants are judged on syrup clarity, color and flavor. The density of the syrup cannot be below 66 brix or it will be disqualified. In 2022, Roger Roseum of Roseum Farms LLC became the first maple syrup producer in the history of the maple festival to win first place for all three color/flavor classifications of maple syrup in a single year, along with being crowned the top maple producer and grand champion.
- Tug-of-war is a skill competition in which two opposing teams pull on either side of a rope over a muddy area to determine which group is stronger. Each team has a 1200-pound weight limit.
- 'PANCAKES IN THE PARK' serves all you can eat pancakes with 2 Heinens sausage links, orange juice and coffee and of course pure Geauga County Maple Syrup. Serving hours are Friday thru Sunday of festival weekend 8am-2pm. Sponsored by Heinens with all proceeds returned to the Geauga County Maple Festival general fund to help bring the festival back next year to Chardon Square

== Festival Queen ==
Each year a pageant is held to choose a queen, king, prince and princess of the festival. Girls from several different area high schools participate in the competition, and a queen, king and two runners-up are chosen. The prince and princess are children from local grade schools.

== Gallery ==
The Geauga County Maple Festival

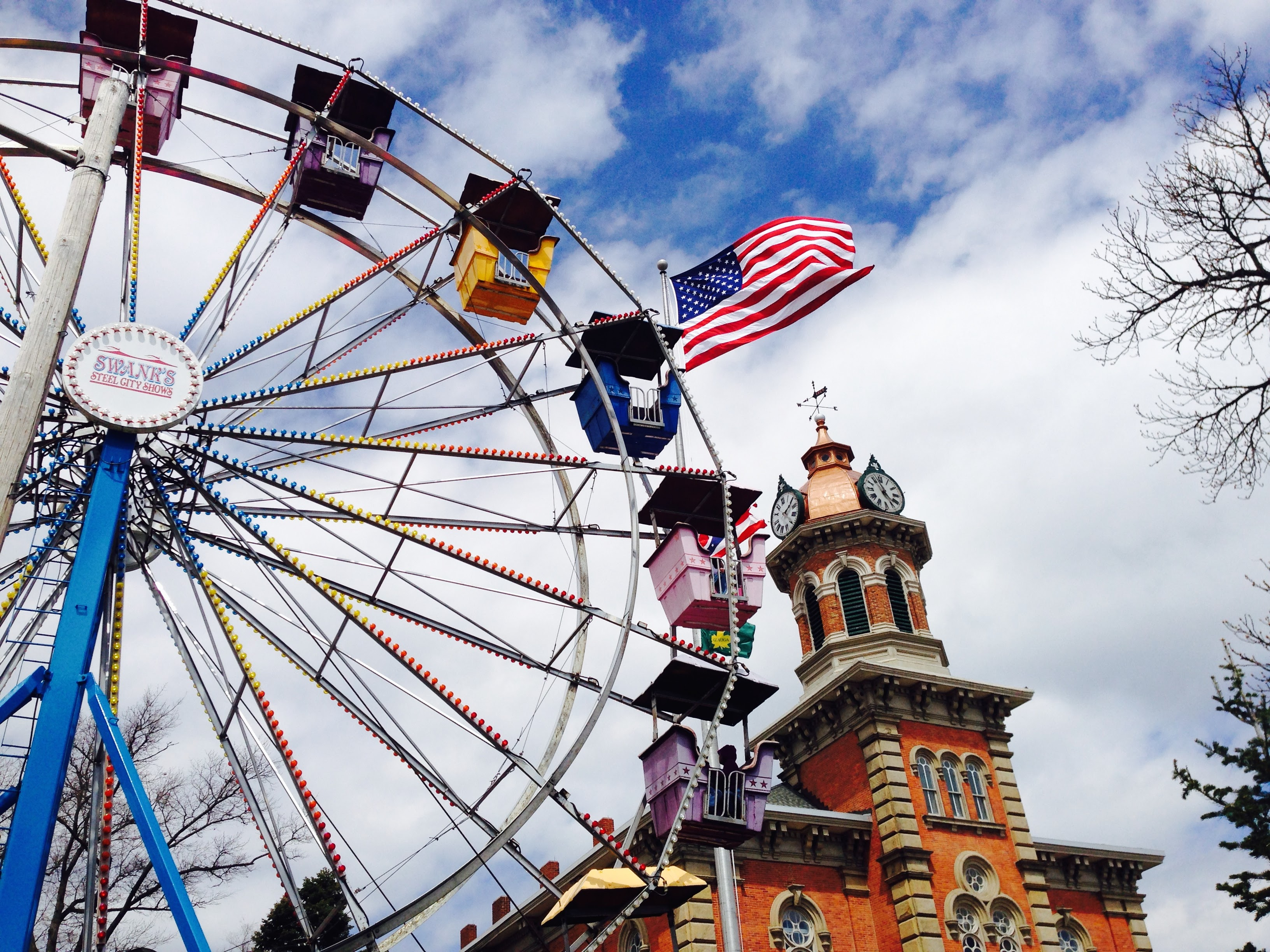

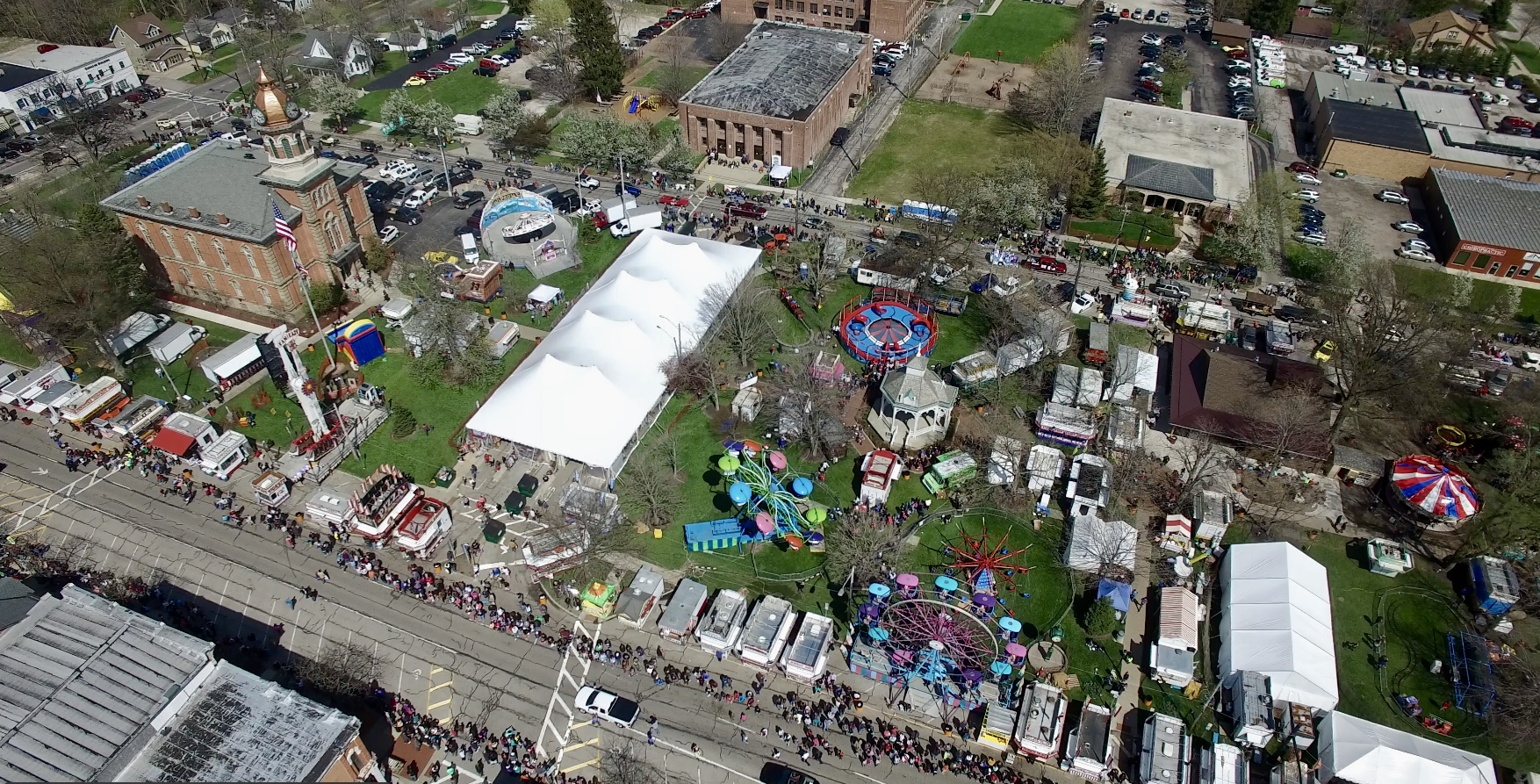

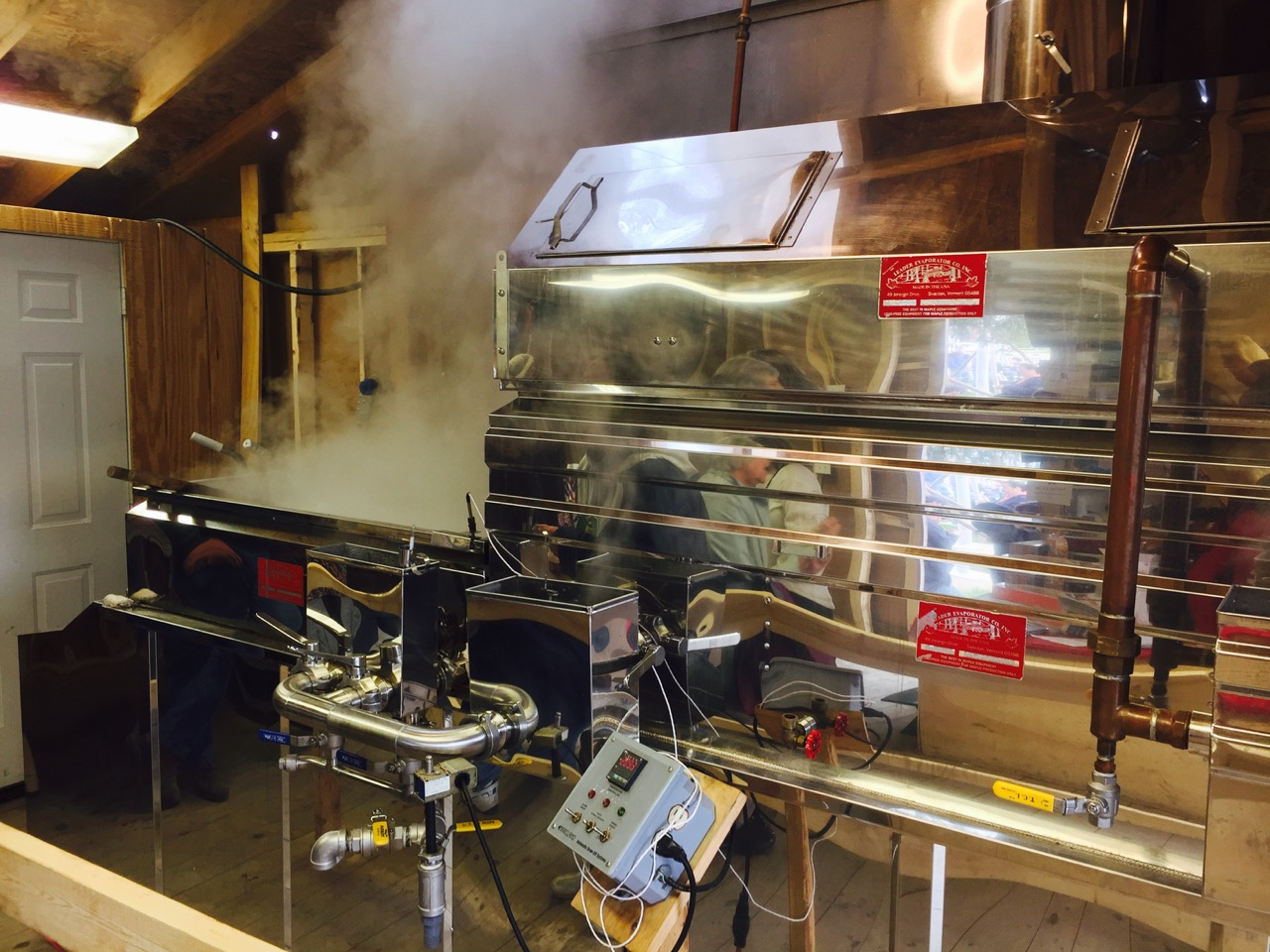

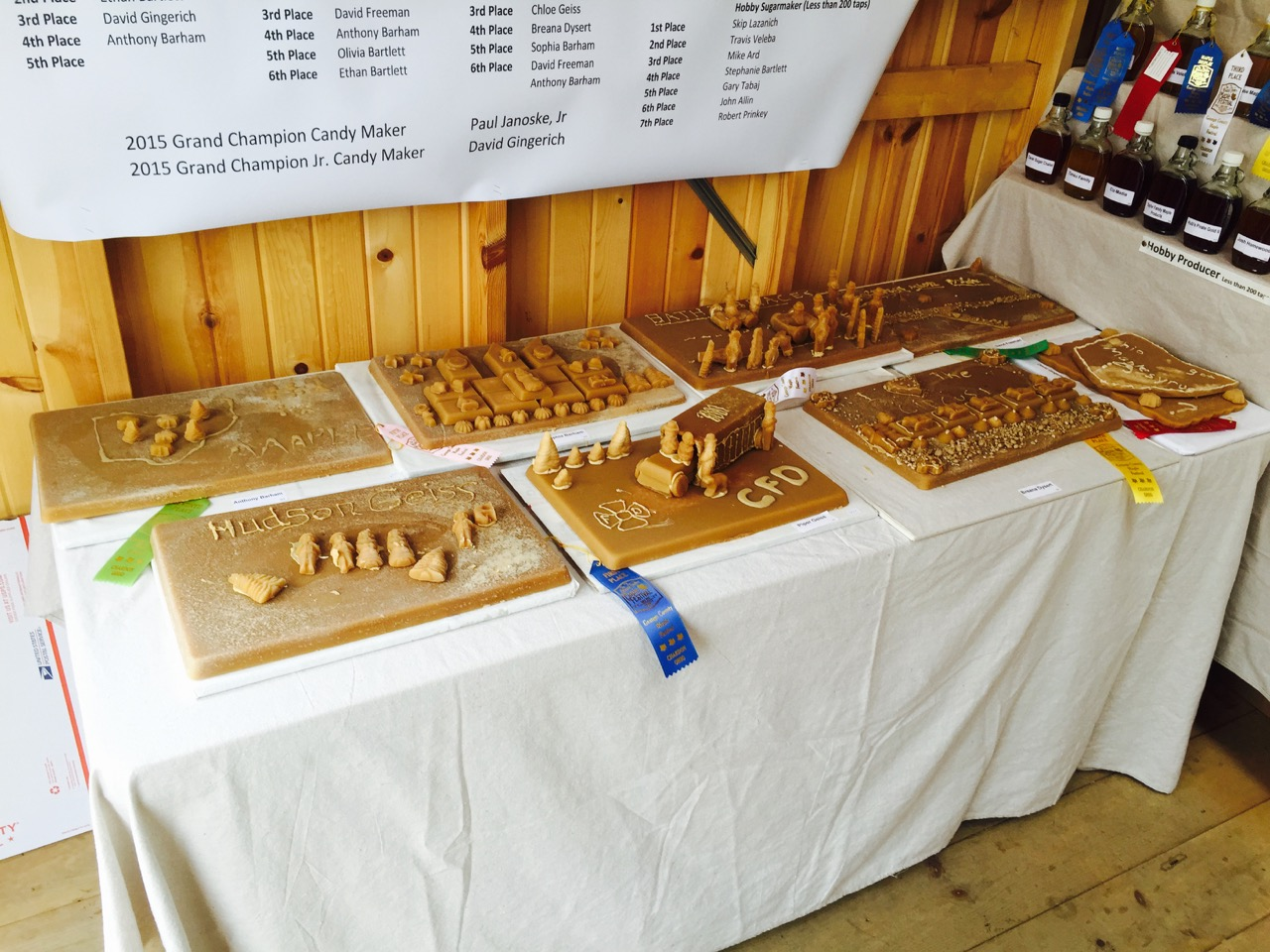

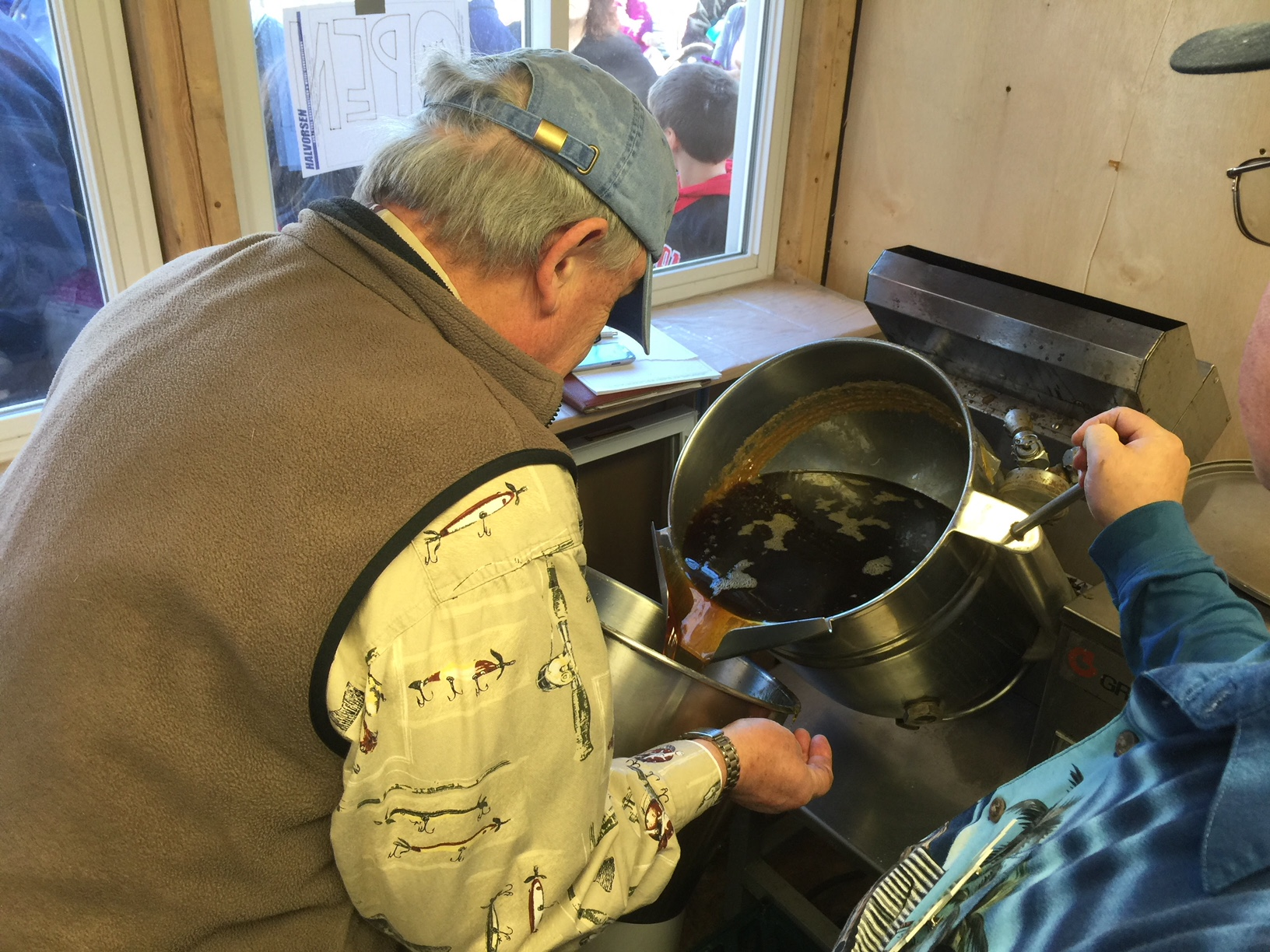

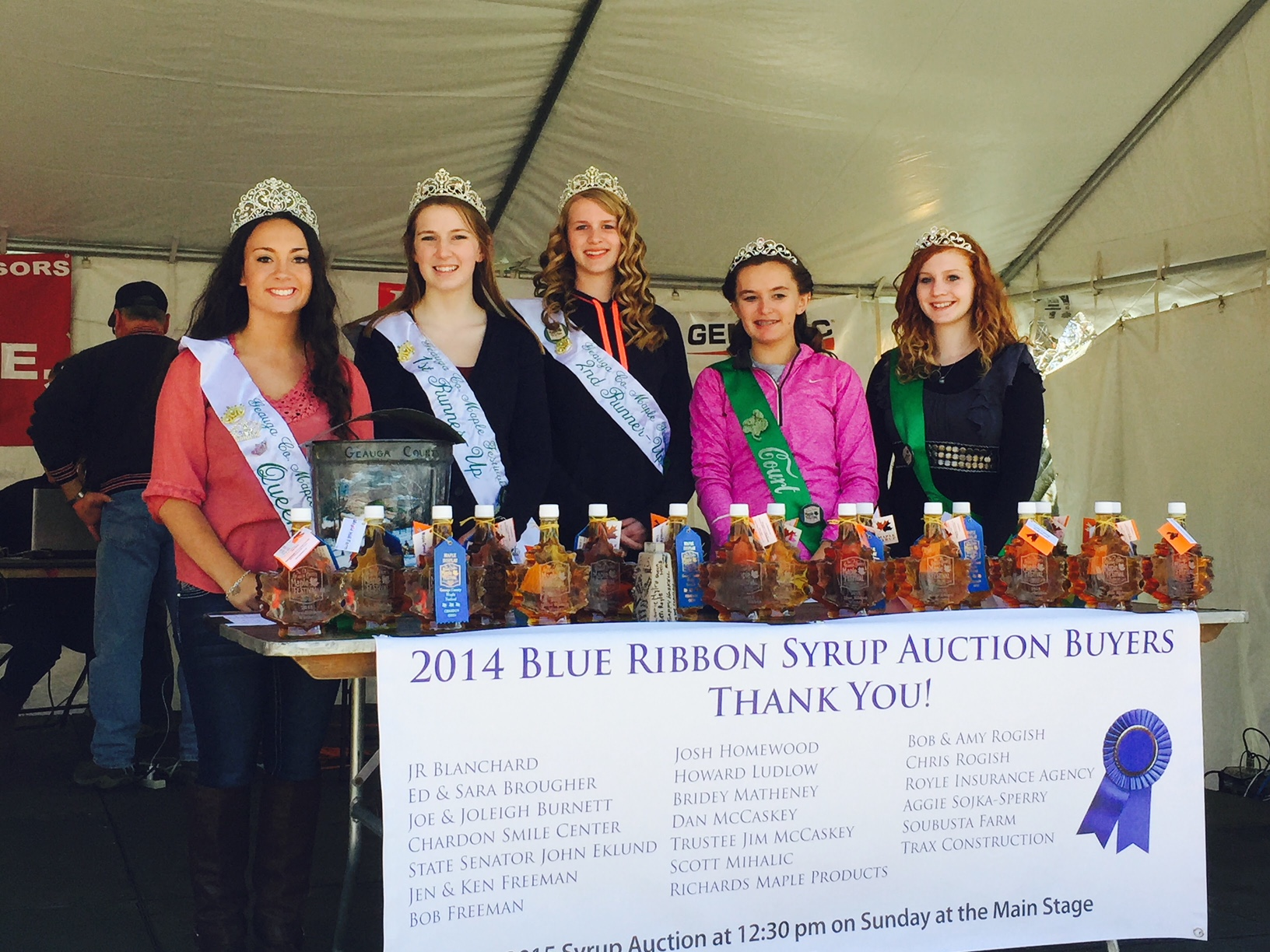

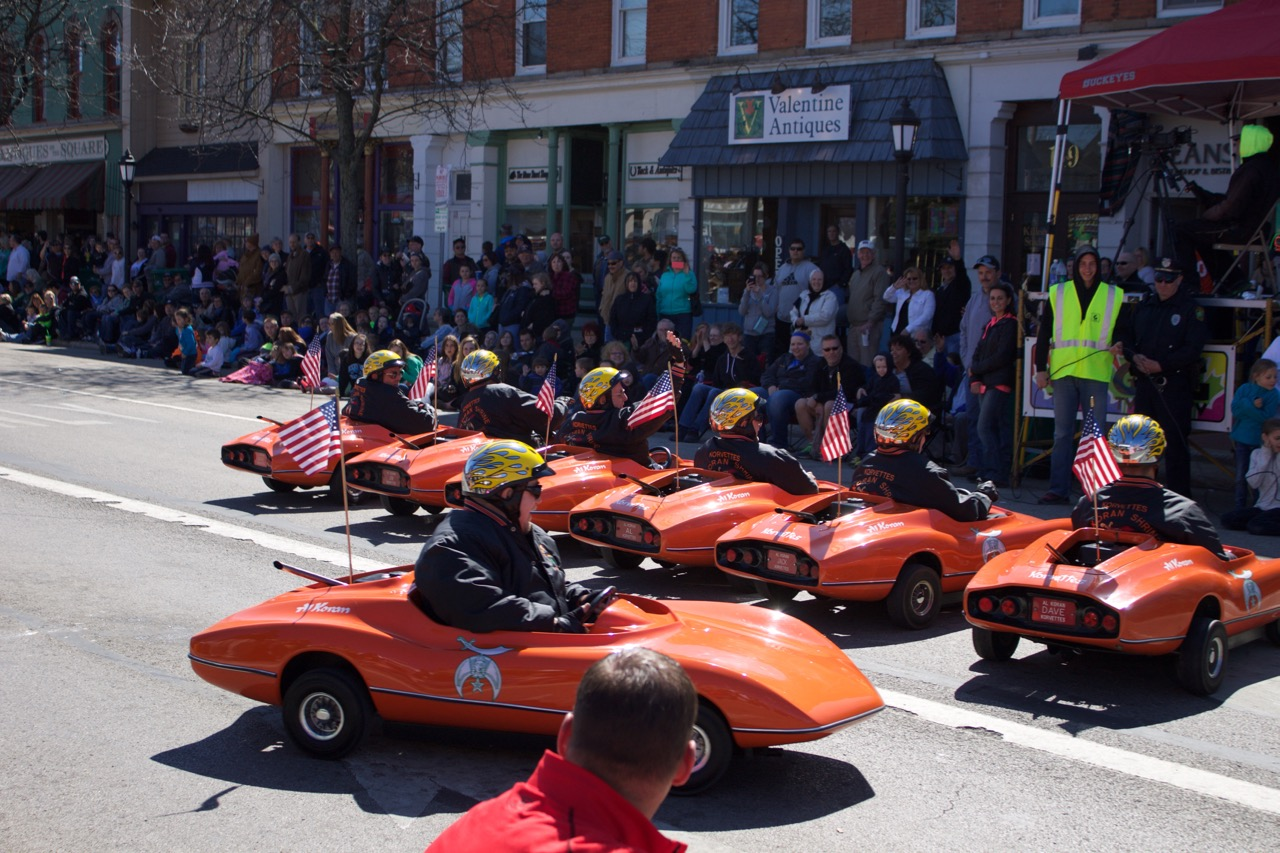

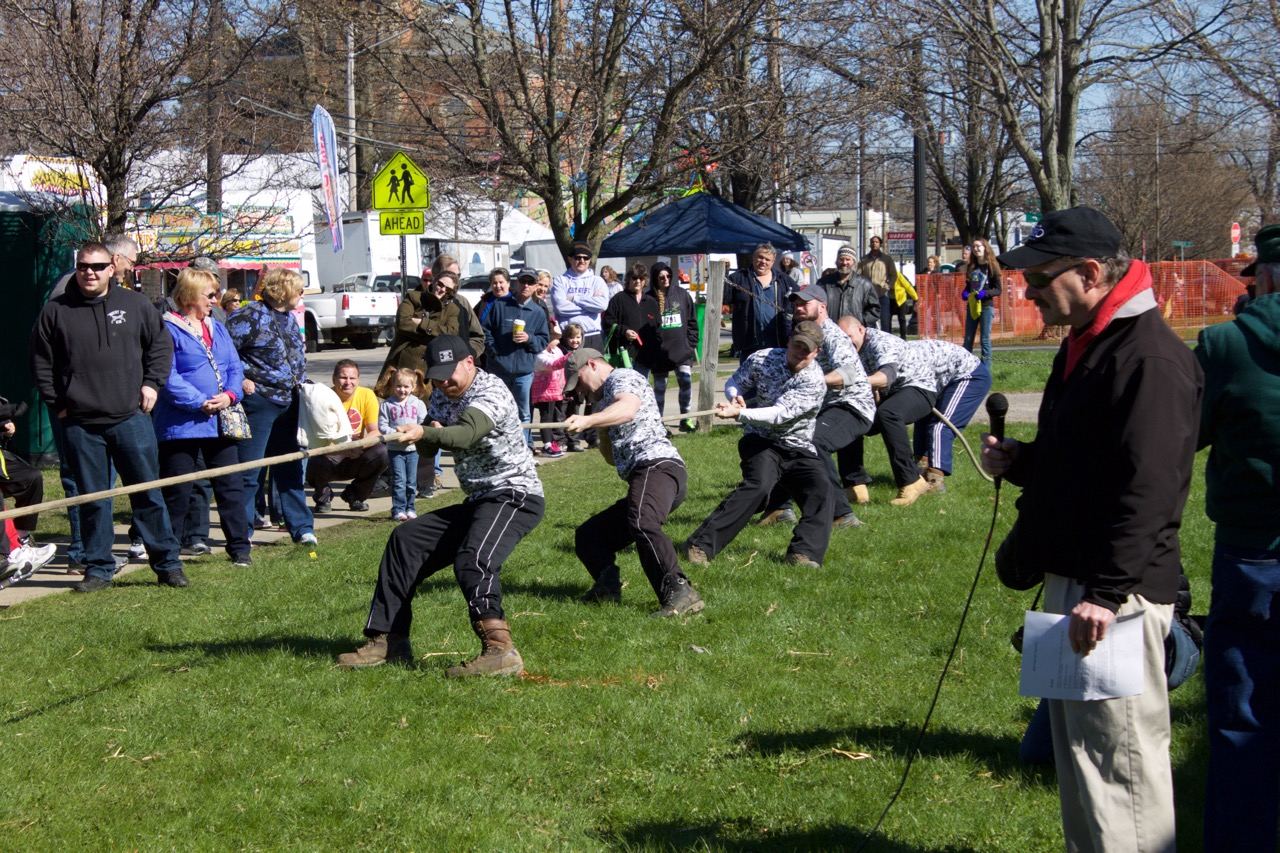

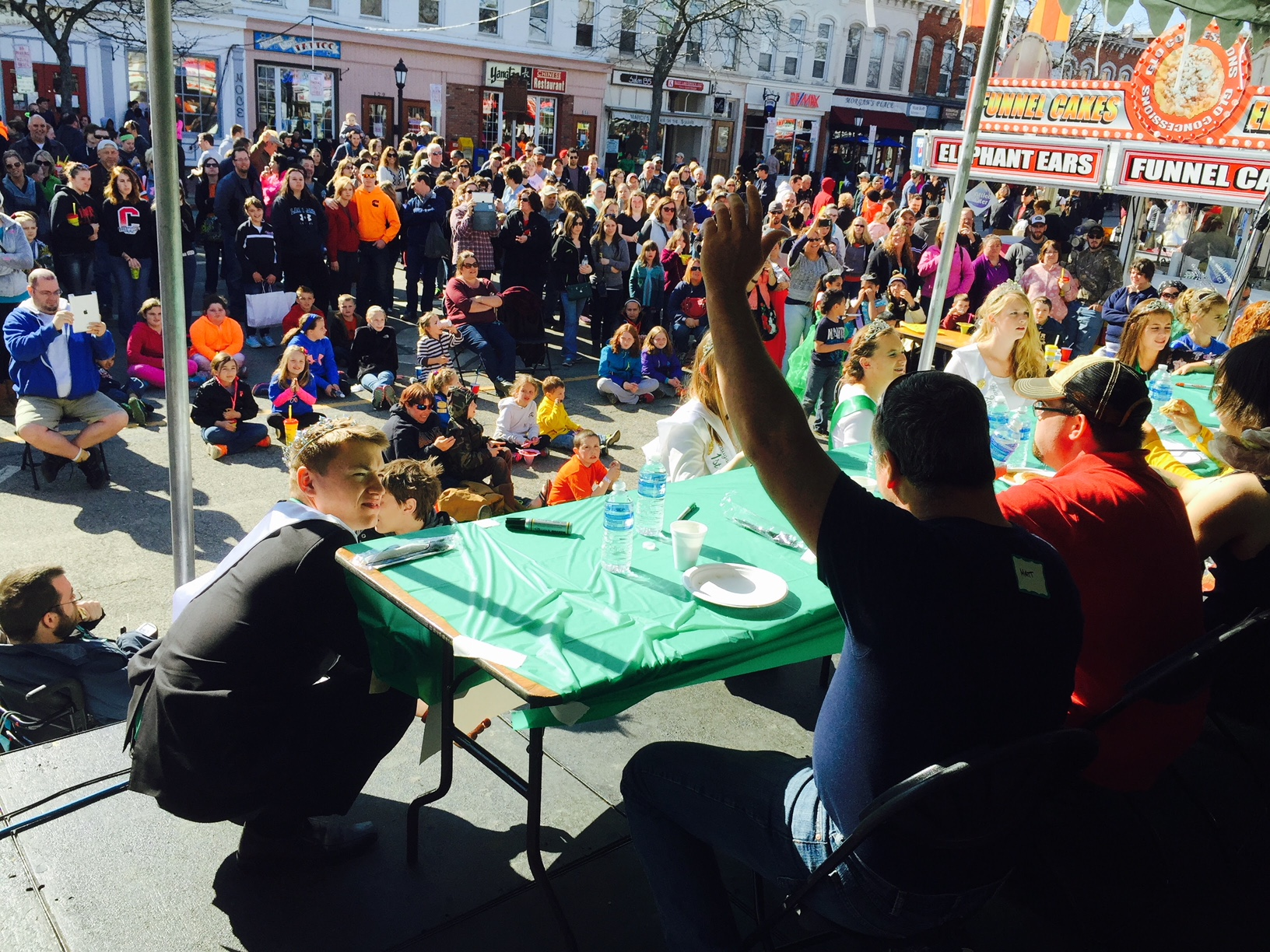

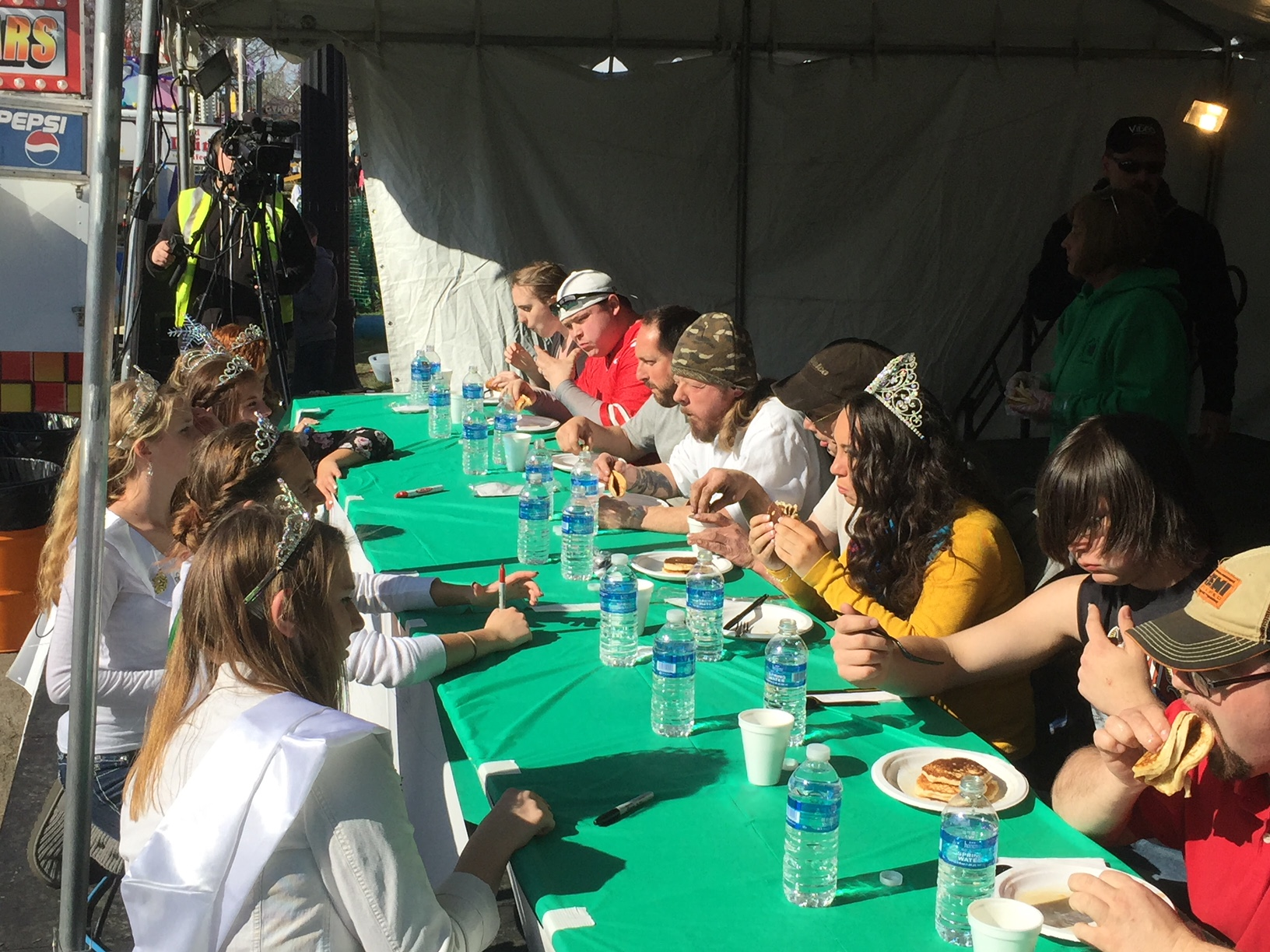

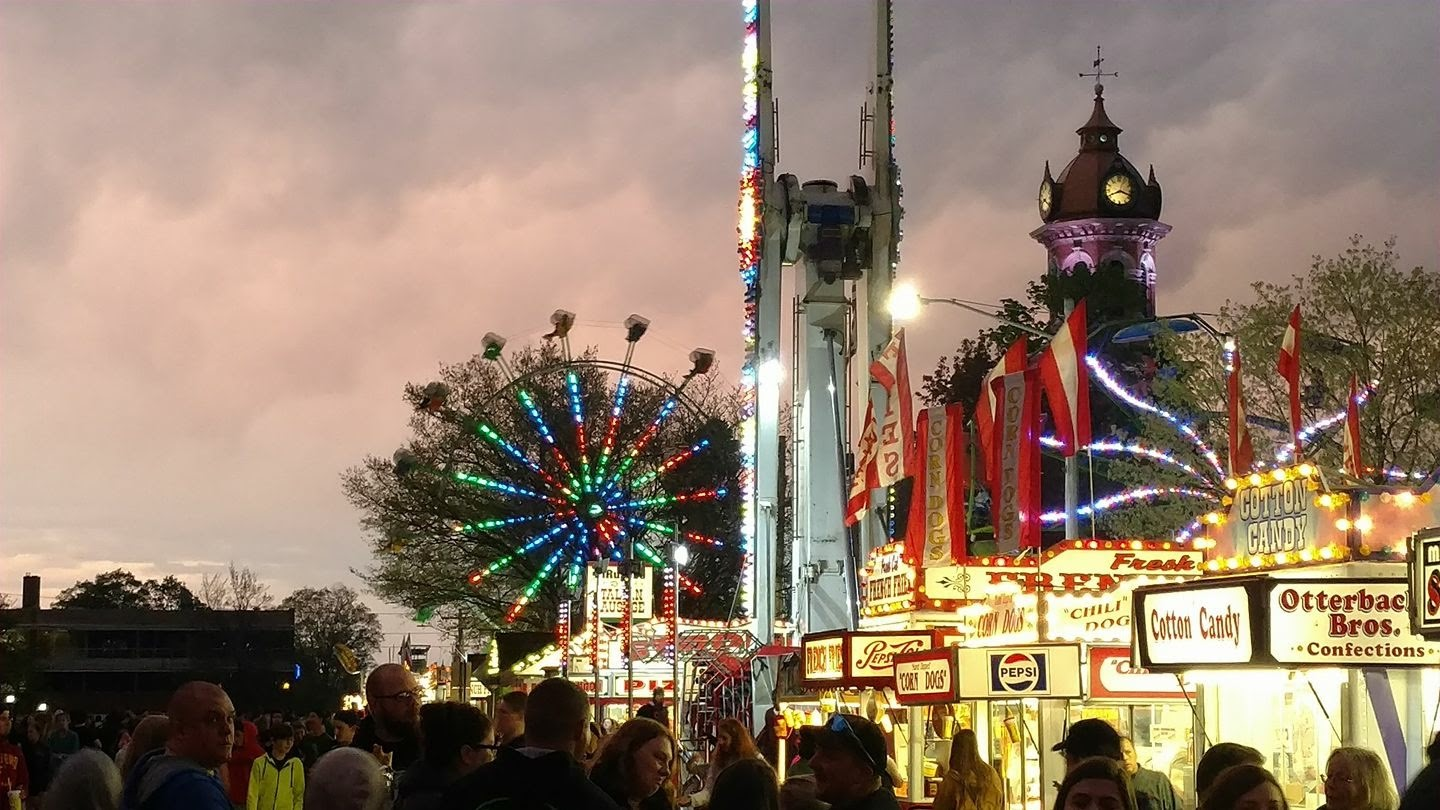

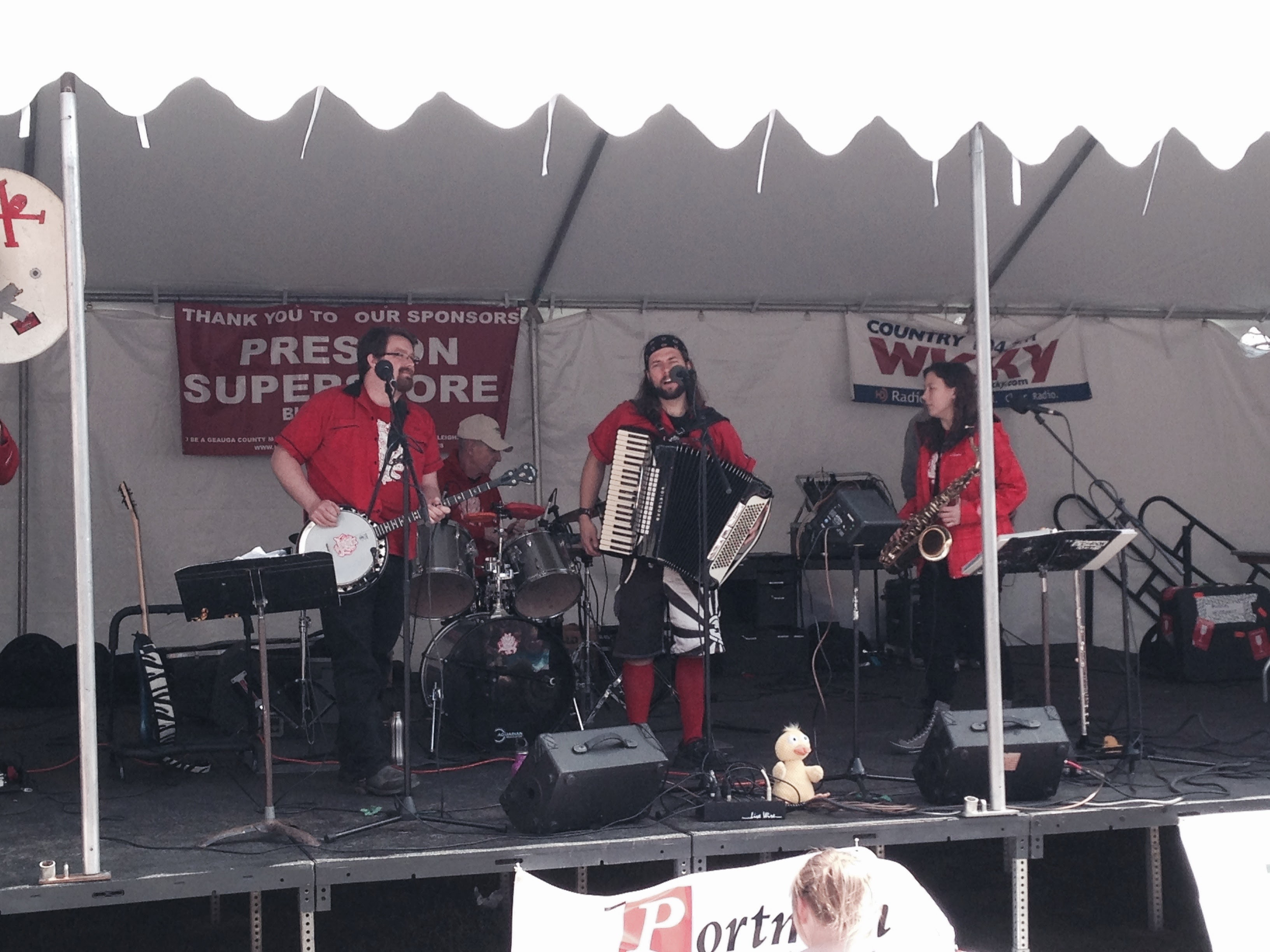

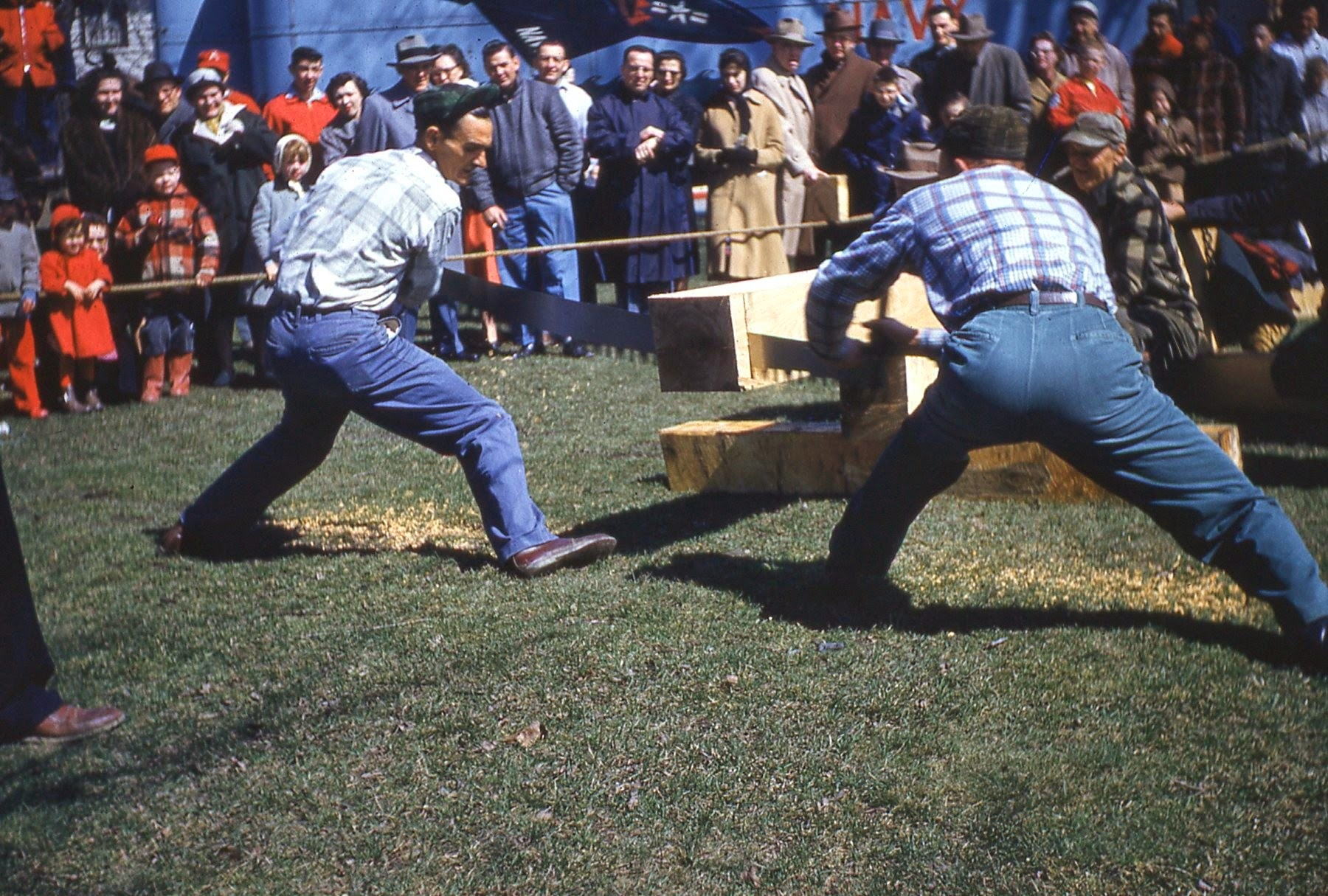

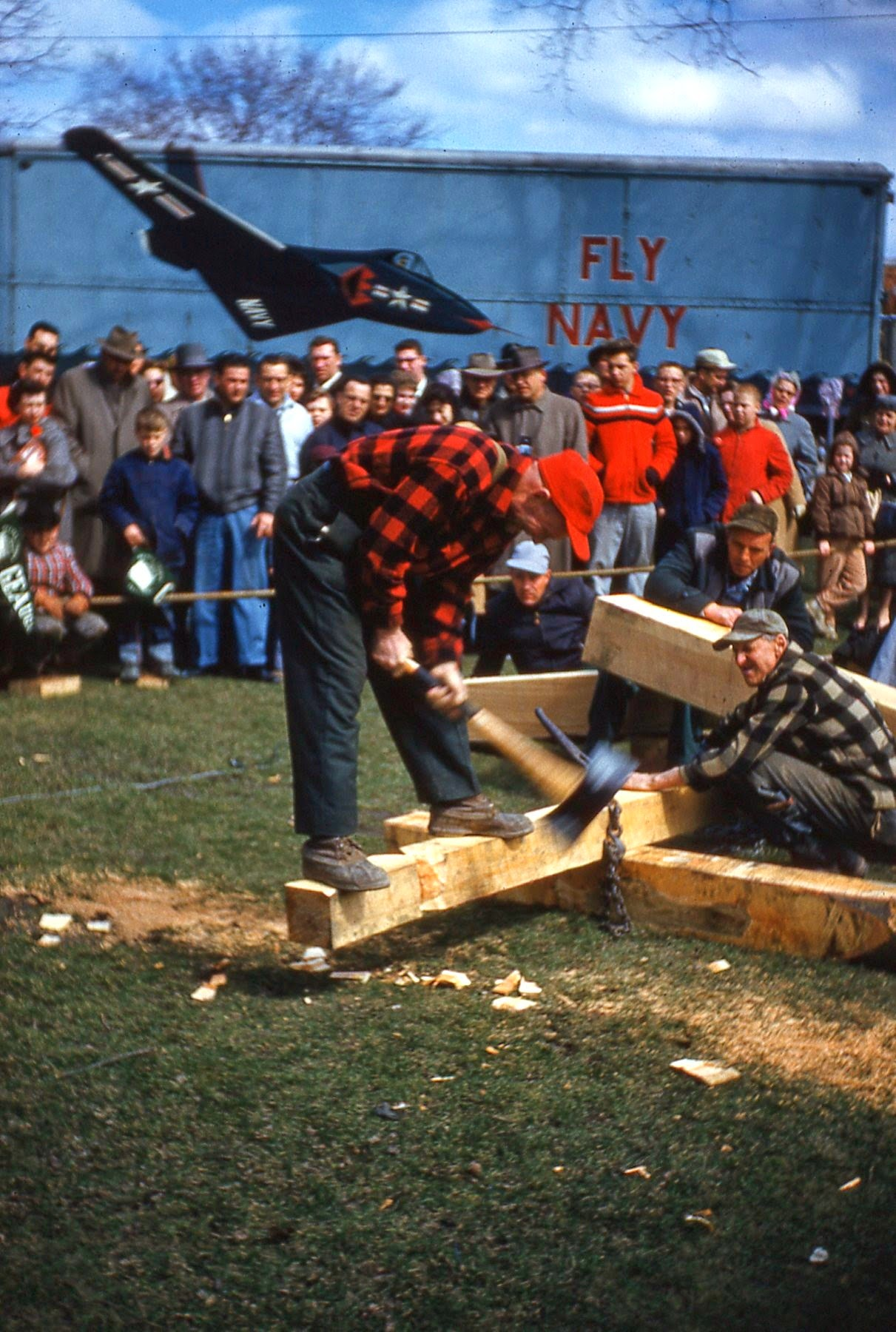

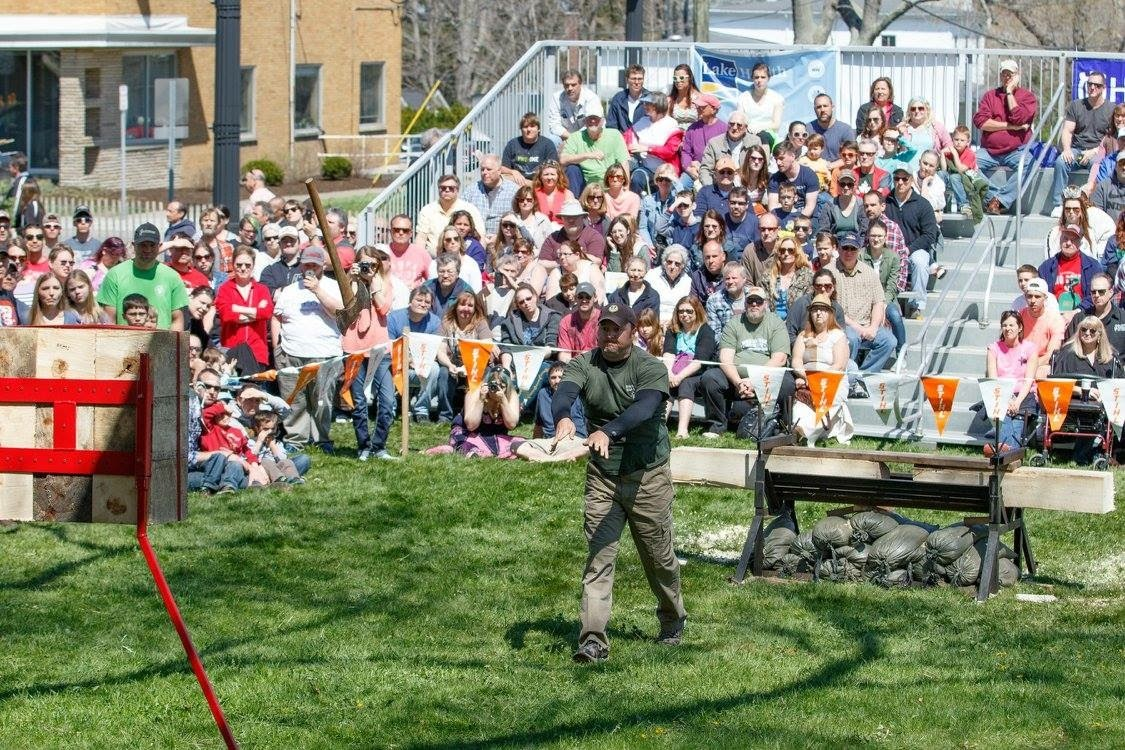

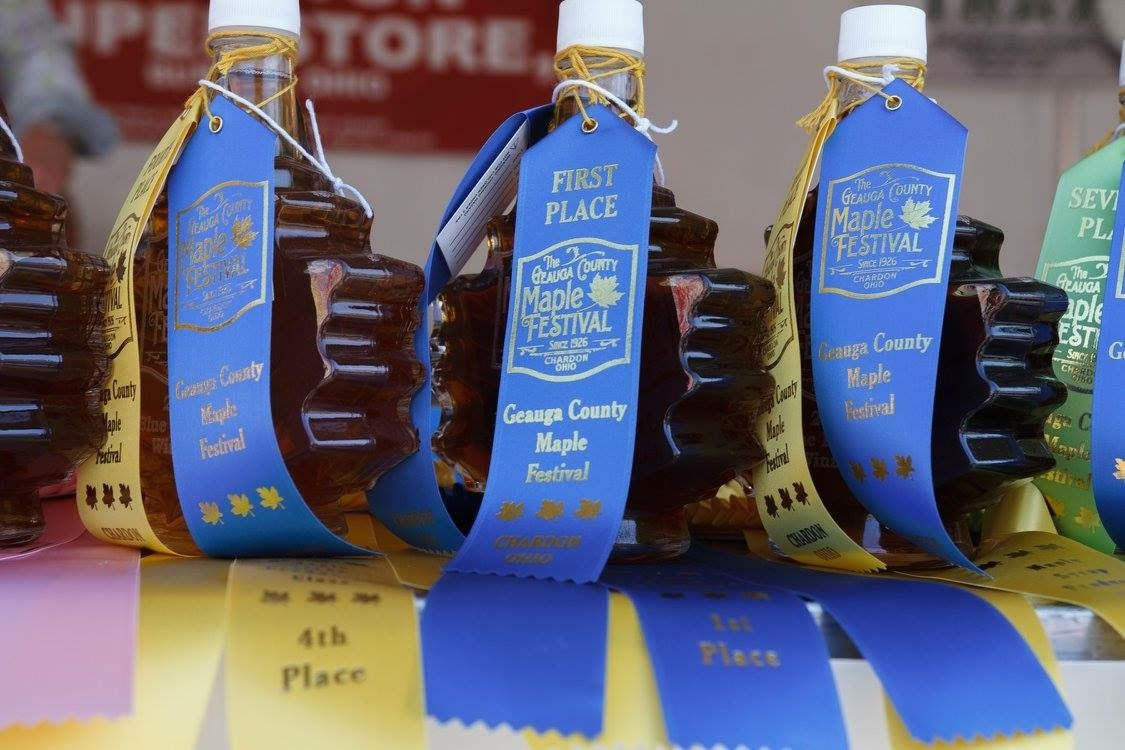

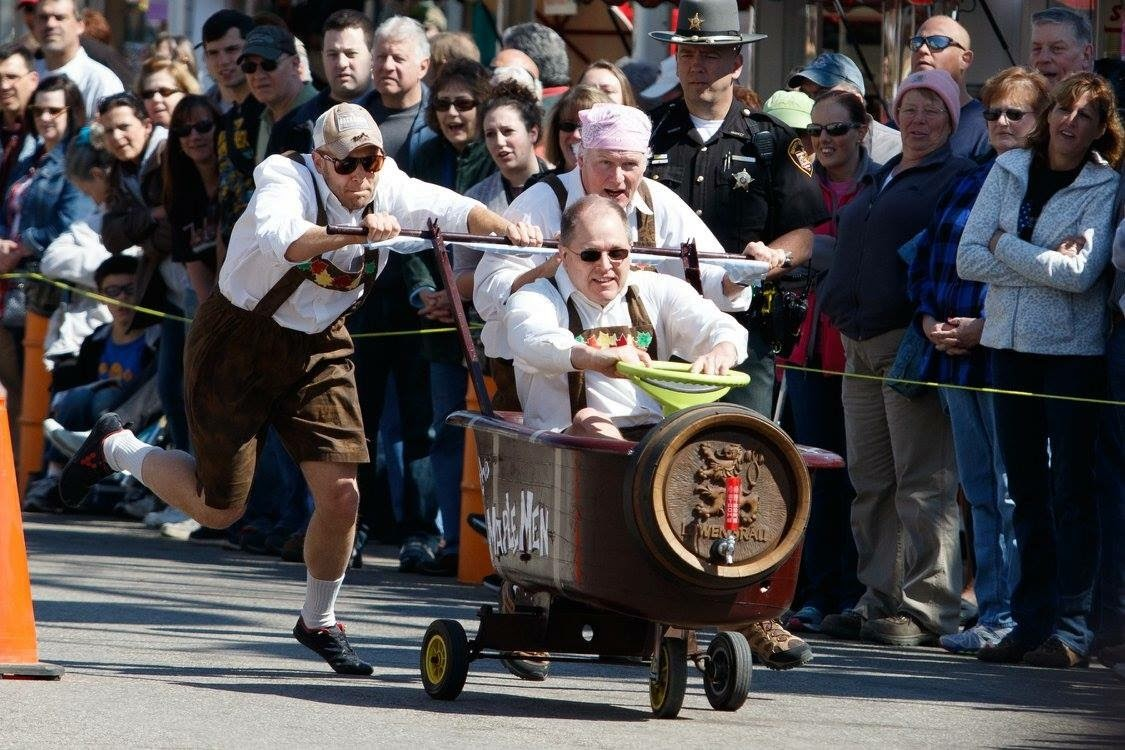

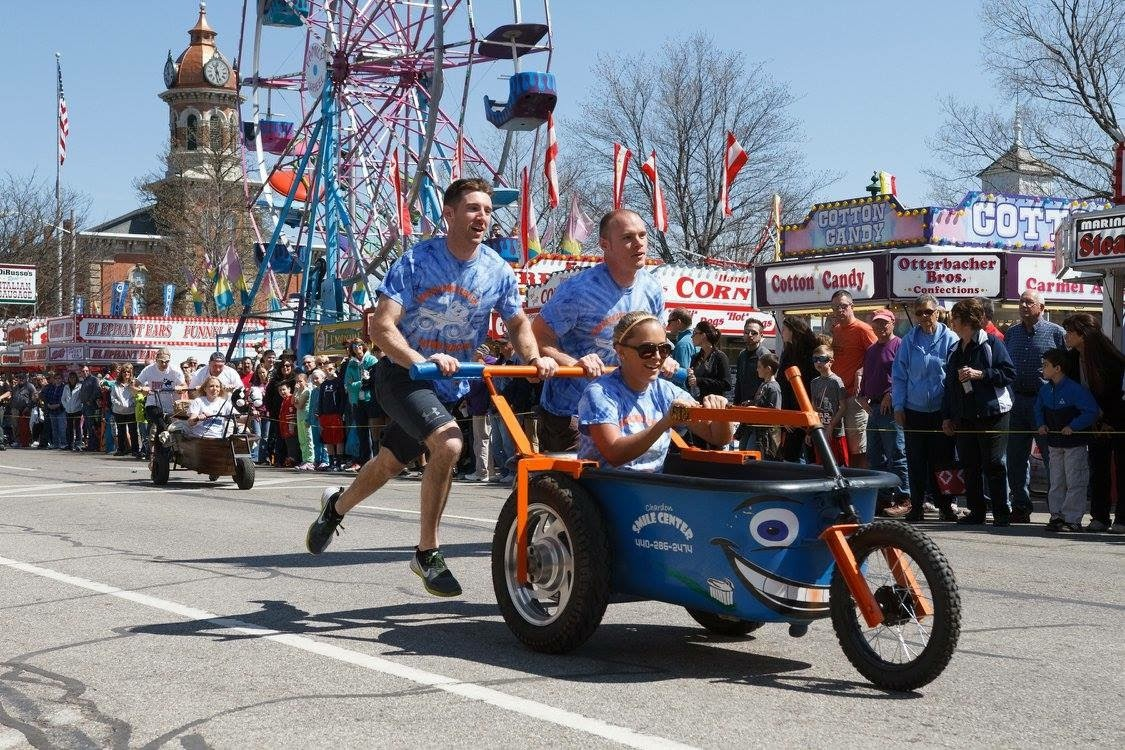

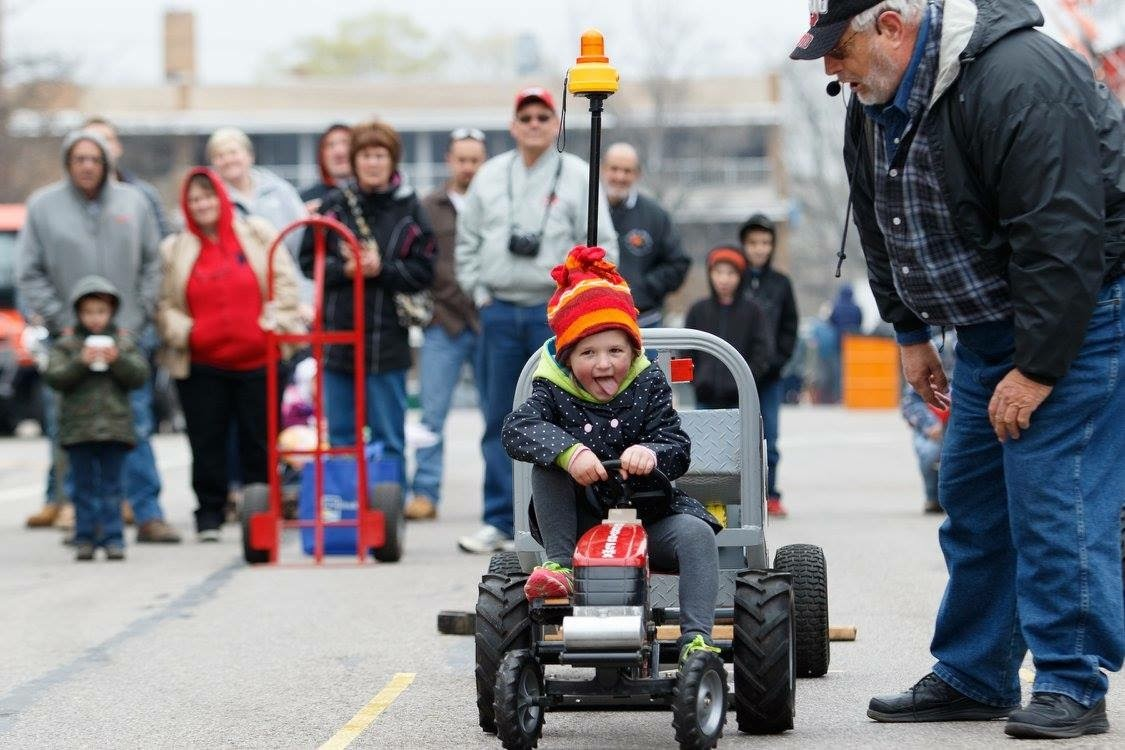
