= Geauga County Courthouse =

Local government building in the United States

- U.S. Historic district – Contributing property
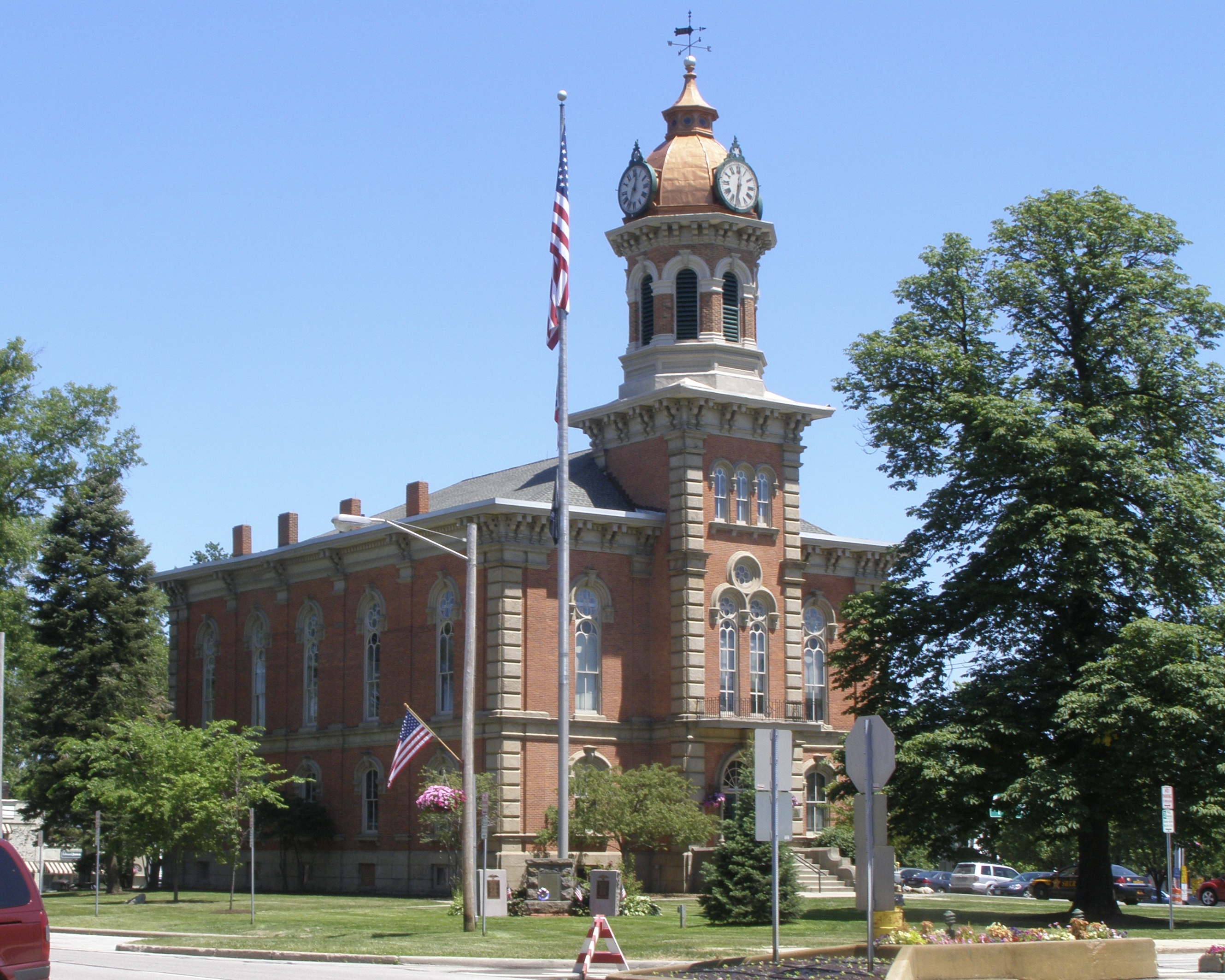
- The Geauga County Courthouse in Chardon, Ohio

- Location within Ohio Location within the United States
- Interactive map showing the location for Geauga County Courthouse
- Location: Chardon, Ohio
- Coordinates: 41°34′58″N 81°12′12″W
- Architect: Joseph Ireland
- Architectural style: Italianate
- Added to NRHP: October 18, 1974

The Geauga County Courthouse is a courthouse located in Chardon, Ohio. The cornerstone was laid September 10, 1869, and construction was completed on August 20, 1870. The courthouse was listed on the National Register in 1974 as part of the Chardon Courthouse Square District.

== History ==
Geauga County was established in 1806, settled initially by migrants primarily from New York and New England, part of the northern tier of culture and politics. It was carved out of Trumbull County. The county seat was first placed at New Market, where a courthouse was built. The records about this first courthouse are inconsistent and little is known about it.

The next year, the county seat was reassigned to Chardon.

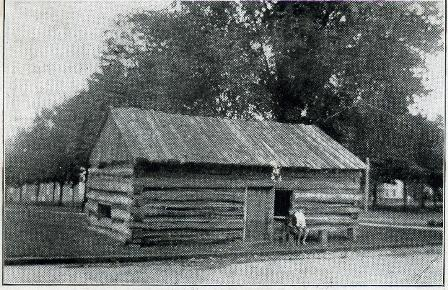
1808 Courthouse, photo of replica built in 1905

Chardon quickly constructed a courthouse, which was completed in 1808. The one-room, log structure with a chimney was completely outfitted with wooden amenities. It had split-log benches, rough wood floors and a stick chimney. This courthouse served the county until 1813, when officials agreed a new and sturdier building was needed.

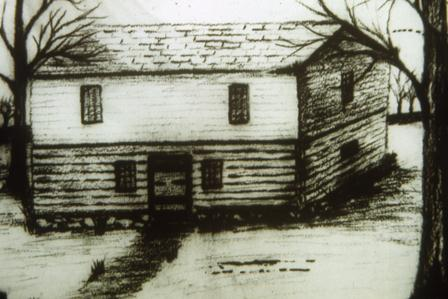
Sketch of the 1813 Courthouse

The county arranged a competition for the new courthouse. The third courthouse was designed by Samuel King for $750 and was built of brick. The details are vague, as the records are conflicting. Some of its details are enmeshed in the records of the 1826 courthouse.

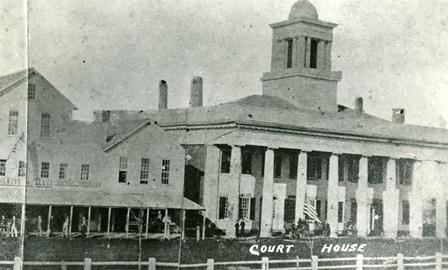
1826 Courthouse

The 1826 Greek Revival courthouse was built of brick and rose two stories high on a rectangular foundation. Long windows lined the sides of the building and featured a Doric columned portico. The hipped roof was pierced by a cupola topped by a spire. In 1848, the building was adapted for use also as the new Chardon Library, the first branch of today's Geauga County Public Library.

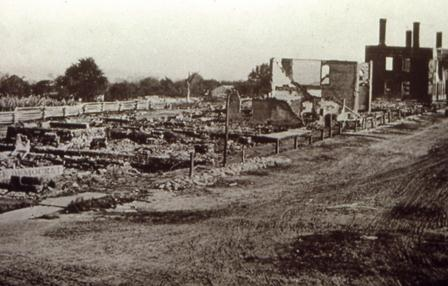
Main Street after the fire of 1868

In July 1868 a massive fire broke out in downtown, destroying the courthouse and almost every other building along Main Street. However, none of its important records were lost. Arson was suspected but never proven.

The county soon ran a competition for the design of its fourth courthouse. The design chosen was by Joseph Ireland. The construction contract was awarded to L. J. Randall. Randall died in 1869 and the project was then overseen by the Meadville, Pennsylvania, construction firm of Carpenter and Matthews, whom Randall had hired as builders. The brick and stone structure was built at a price of $88,862. The courthouse standing today is basically the same, although renovations have added some minor interior alterations and upgrades.

== Exterior ==
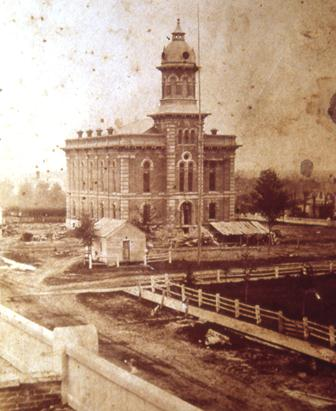
1869 courthouse under construction

The courthouse features red brick exterior with light sandstone quoins. The building contains a central projection, also framed by quoins. The windows on the first floor are low arched windows on either side of the projection. The second-floor windows are interesting as the windows contain long arched windows with circular windows above with smaller circular tracings. The whole window is framed by a sandstone casing and white wooden trim. The flat roof rests on an entablature with decorative brackets.

The tower consists of an octagonal louvered cupola and a dome with four teardrop-shaped clock faces and a weathervane topping the central spire. The entrance contains double doors topped by a fanlight. Above the door is a balcony lined with wrought iron railings. A central window is located in the middle of the tower with two long arched windows, each topped with circular windows like the ones above the second-floor windows. The entire building, base to weathervane, is 112 feet (34 m) tall.

In 1974 the courthouse was listed on the National Register of Historic Places (NRHP) as part of the Chardon Courthouse Square District.

== Renovations ==
The courthouse has undergone several revisions since its initial construction. It was wired for electricity in 1898, and central heating was installed in 1902. An elevator to the third floor was added in 1960, and in 1965, the second-floor courtroom underwent major renovations, including the removal of the dome in its ceiling. This created enough room above it for the addition of a second courtroom on the third floor, which housed the county's probate court.

A mechanical clock was added to the courthouse's bell tower in 1908. This initial clock was replaced by an electric one in 1940, which was damaged by lightning in 1978. Both the clock and tower were renovated in 1995.
