= Free Will Baptist Church of Auburn =

Historic church in Ohio, United States

- Free Will Baptist Church Of Auburn
- U.S. National Register of Historic Places
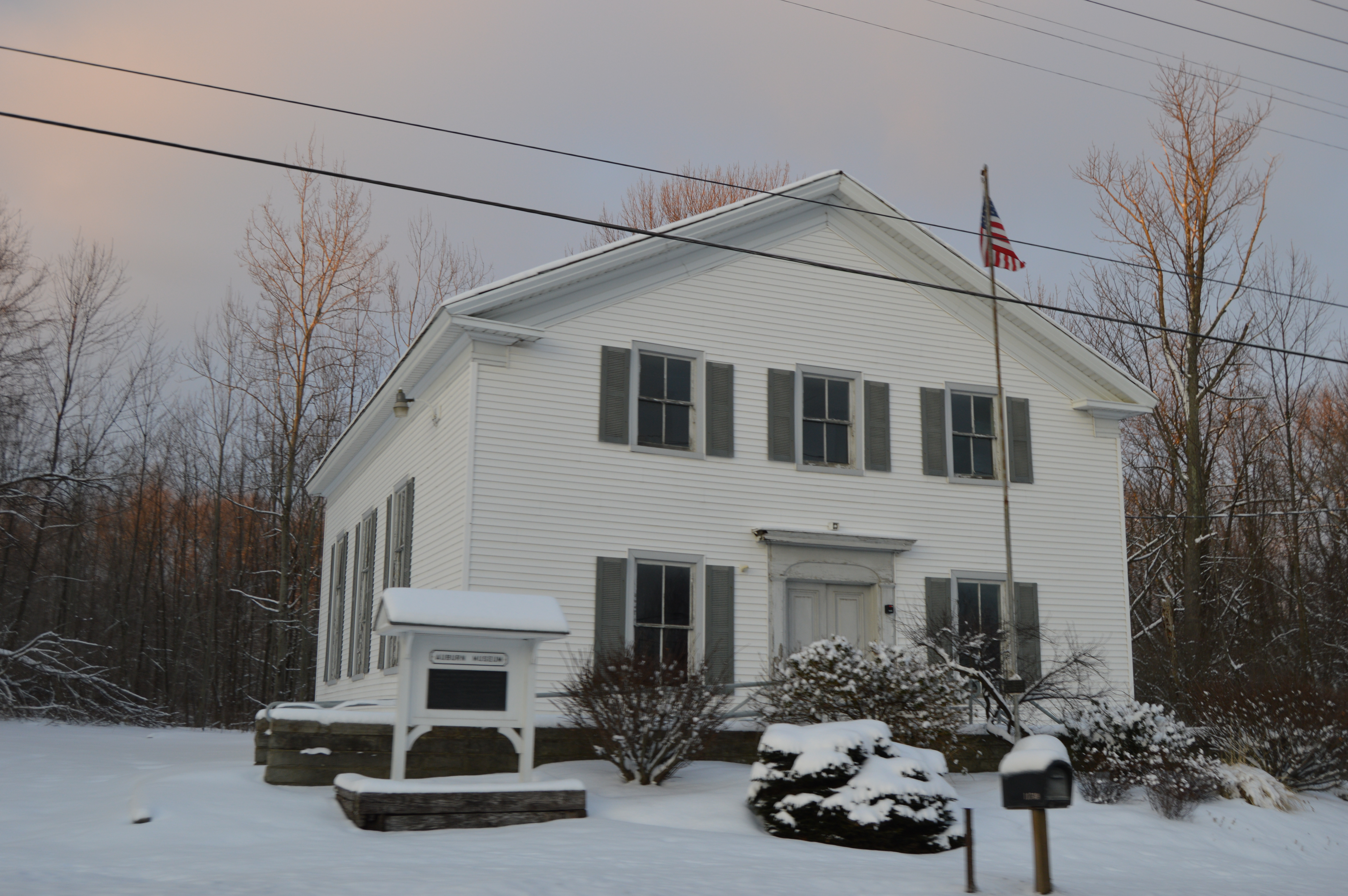
- Front and western side of the church

- Location within Ohio Location within the United States
- Location: 11742 E. Washington St., Auburn Corners, Ohio
- Coordinates: 41°23′15″N 81°13′8″W
- Area: Less than 1 acre (0.40 ha)
- Built: 1839
- Architectural style: Greek Revival
- NRHP reference No.: 76001430
- Added to NRHP: May 28, 1976

The Auburn Free Will Baptist Church is a historic former Baptist church building in Auburn Township, Geauga County, Ohio, United States. Constructed in the second quarter of the nineteenth century, it is no longer home to the congregation that built it, but it remains a significant component of the area's built environment, and it has been named a historic site.

The Auburn Free Will Baptist Church was formed in 1839 or 1840, led by an Elder Miller as the first pastor. The congregation was able to build a church building by the end of 1840, but forty years later the congregation remained weak enough that they were forced to share their pastor with another church. Before the building was finished, the church often worshipped in a schoolhouse or in a barn belonging to farmer Richard Slitor. After its construction, it was used both by Baptists and by the Methodists for most of the rest of the century, and the Baptists continued worshipping in it until the era of the Second World War.

Built with clapboarded walls on a foundation of sandstone, the church is most distinctive for its roofline and the roof's structural support. From the outside, the roof resembles an ordinary gable roof, but an unusual system of trusses and diagonal bracing supports the underside of the roof. Local historians have deemed this construction style particularly rare in the Connecticut Western Reserve. With this exception, it is typical of the region's vernacular Greek Revival churches; three windows appear on the sides and on the second story of the front, while the main entrance is centered between a window on each side of the front's first floor. A tower once sat atop the front of the building.

In May 1976, the church was listed on the National Register of Historic Places, qualifying both because of its historically distinctive architecture and because of its place in local history. It is the only National Register-listed location in Auburn Township, and one of three Geauga County churches with this designation, along with the Claridon Congregational Church in Claridon Township and the South Newbury Union Chapel in Newbury Township.
