= Thompson, Ohio =

Unincorporated community in Ohio, U.S.

Coordinates: 41°41′24″N 81°03′05″W

Thompson is an unincorporated community in Thompson Township, Geauga County, in the U.S. state of Ohio at an elevation of 1270 ft (287 m). The Thompson Ledges, an important geologic and topographic feature of northeast Ohio, are located nearby.

== History ==
A post office called Thompson has been in operation since 1825. The community has the name of Matthew Thompson, a pioneer settler.

== Education ==
Public education in Thompson is administered by the Berkshire Local Schools district. Thompson has a public library, a branch of the Geauga County Public Library.
