= Geauga County Public Library =

Library system for Geauga County, Ohio, U.S.

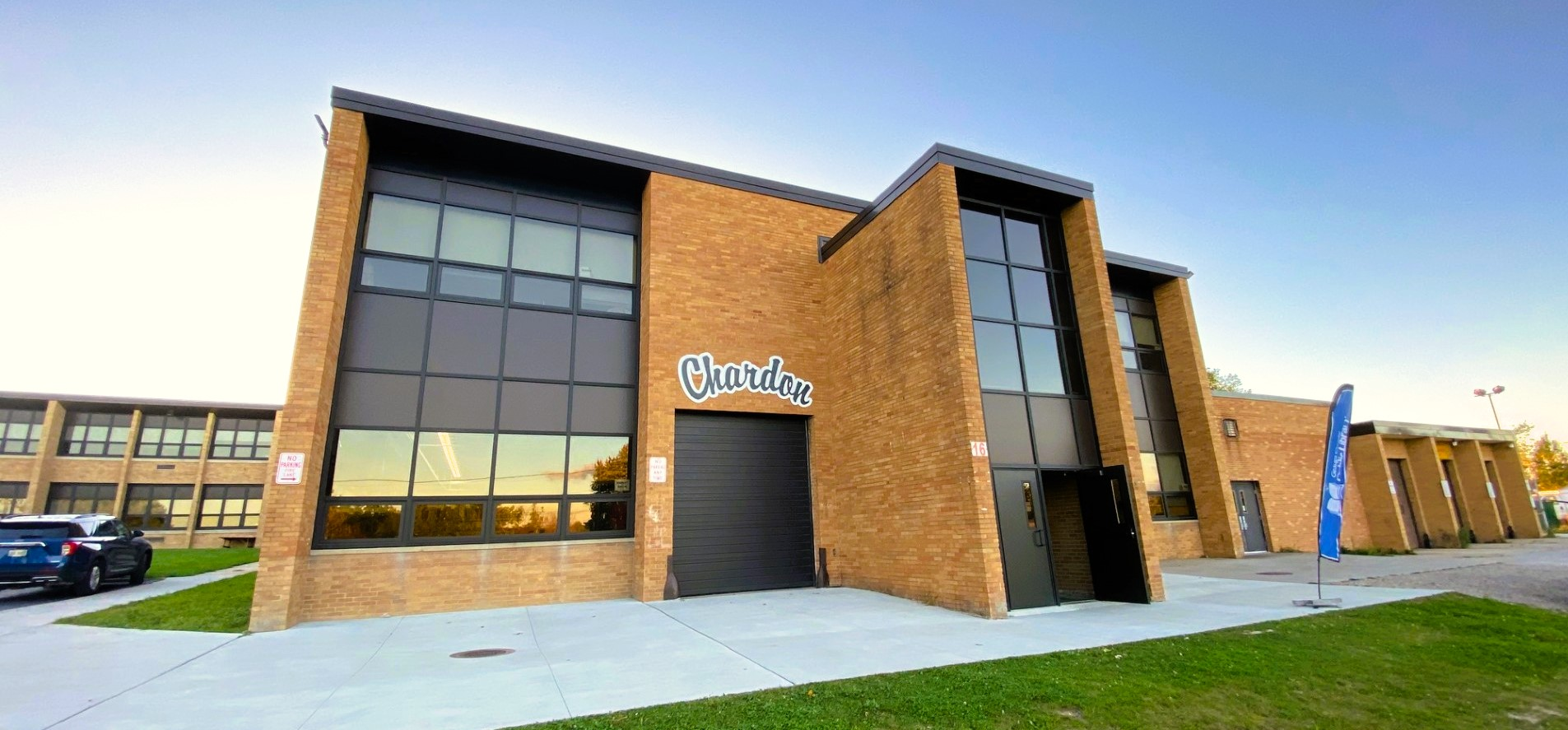
Geauga County Public Library, Chardon Branch

Geauga County Public Library, founded in 1848, is the main library system for Geauga County, Ohio.

== About ==
Located in Geauga County, Ohio, the Geauga County Public Library includes four full-service community libraries in Bainbridge, Chardon, Geauga West (Chester Township) and Middlefield; one library station in Thompson; one Bookmobile that serves farms, nursing homes and nursery schools; and one administrative center where technical services, computer services, facilities and administrative functions reside. GCPL's collection contains more than 500,000 books and e-books, along with an excess of 100,000 audio and video material, and 300 research databases available through its website.

== History ==
The first branch was the Chardon Library, founded at the Chardon Courthouse in 1848. The library was moved to various locations as it expanded. In 1913, it was moved to the Village Hall, and the first library board was appointed. Service to schools, and extension work throughout the county, began in 1936.

Middlefield Library opened in 1942, Chesterland Library in 1957. In 1963, Chardon Library became Geauga Public Library.

== Branches ==
The Geauga County Public Library System branches are:

- Bainbridge Library
- Chardon Library
- Geauga West Library
- Middlefield Library
- Thompson Library Station and the Bookmobile
