= Auburn Township, Geauga County, Ohio =

Township in Ohio, US

- Township
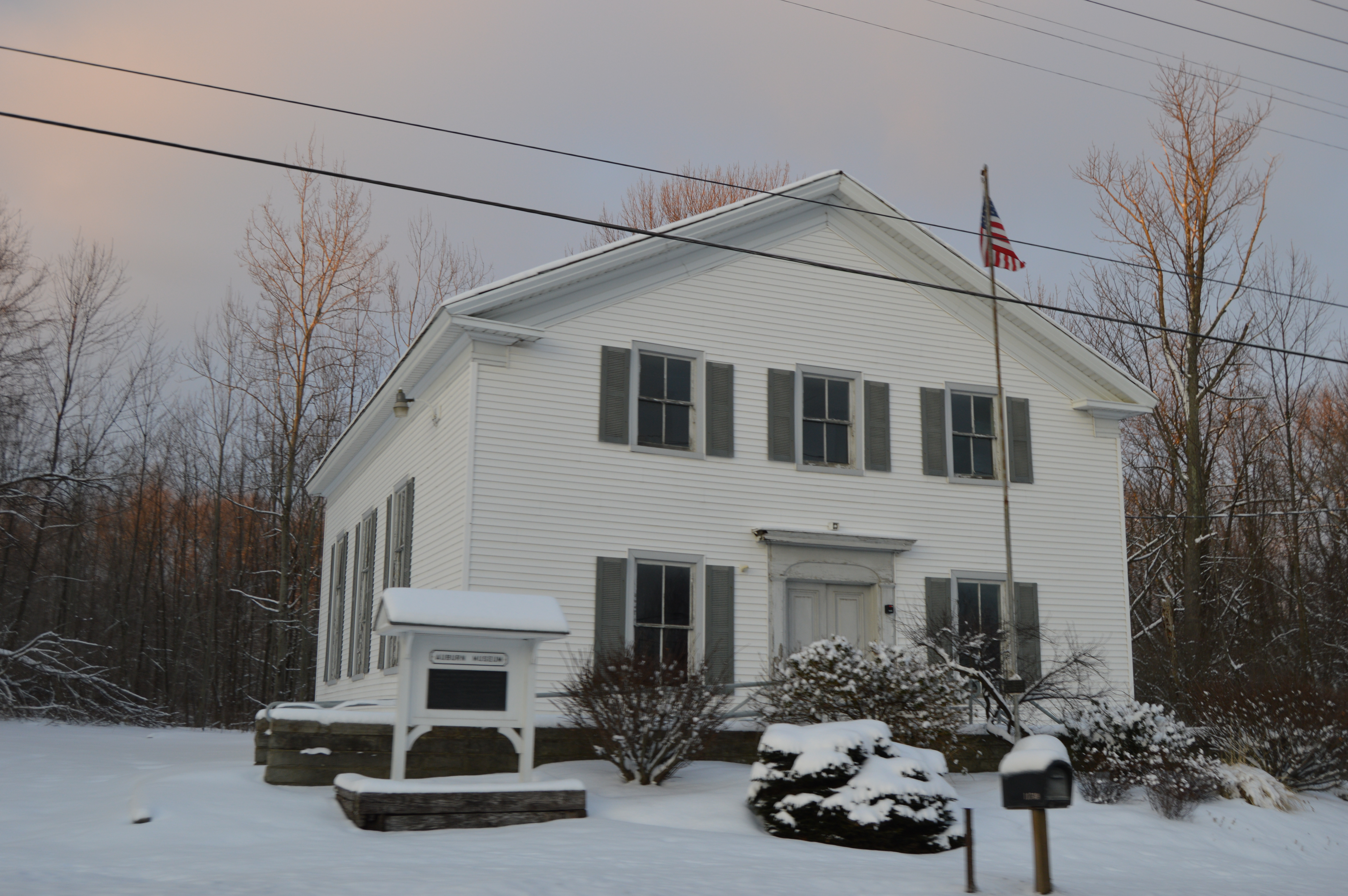
- The former Free Will Baptist Church of Auburn

- Logo

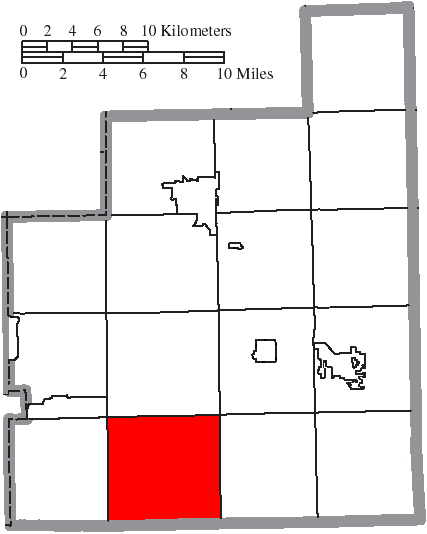
- Location of Auburn Township in Geauga County
- Coordinates: 41°23′9″N 81°15′26″W
- Country: United States
- State: Ohio
- County: Geauga

Area
  - Total: 29.9 sq mi (77.5 km^{2})
  - Land: 27.7 sq mi (71.7 km^{2})
  - Water: 2.2 sq mi (5.8 km^{2})
- Elevation: 1,234 ft (376 m)

Population (2020)
  - Total: 6,574
  - Density: 237/sq mi (91.7/km^{2})
- Time zone: UTC-5 (Eastern (EST))
  - Summer (DST): UTC-4 (EDT)
- ZIP code: 44023
- Area code: 440
- FIPS code: 39-02904
- GNIS feature ID: 1086147
- Website: auburntownship.com

Auburn Township is one of the sixteen townships of Geauga County, Ohio, United States. As of the 2020 census, the population was 6,574.

== Geography ==
Located in the southern part of the county, it borders the following townships and city:

- Newbury Township - north
- Burton Township - northeast corner
- Troy Township - east
- Hiram Township, Portage County - southeast corner
- Mantua Township, Portage County - south
- Aurora - southwest corner
- Bainbridge Township - west
- Russell Township - northwest corner

No municipalities are located in Auburn Township.

== Name and history ==
Statewide, other Auburn Townships are located in Crawford and Tuscarawas counties. Auburn Township was founded by the Bradley and Snow families of South Newbury, New Hampshire.

== Government ==
The township is governed by a three-member board of trustees, who are elected in November of odd-numbered years to a four-year term beginning on the following January 1. Two are elected in the year after the presidential election and one is elected in the year before it. There is also an elected township fiscal officer, who serves a four-year term beginning on April 1 of the year after the election, which is held in November of the year before the presidential election. Vacancies in the fiscal officership or on the board of trustees are filled by the remaining trustees.

== Notable person ==
- Clayton E. Crafts, Speaker of the Illinois House of Representatives and lawyer, was born in Auburn Township.
