= Chardon, Ohio =

- City
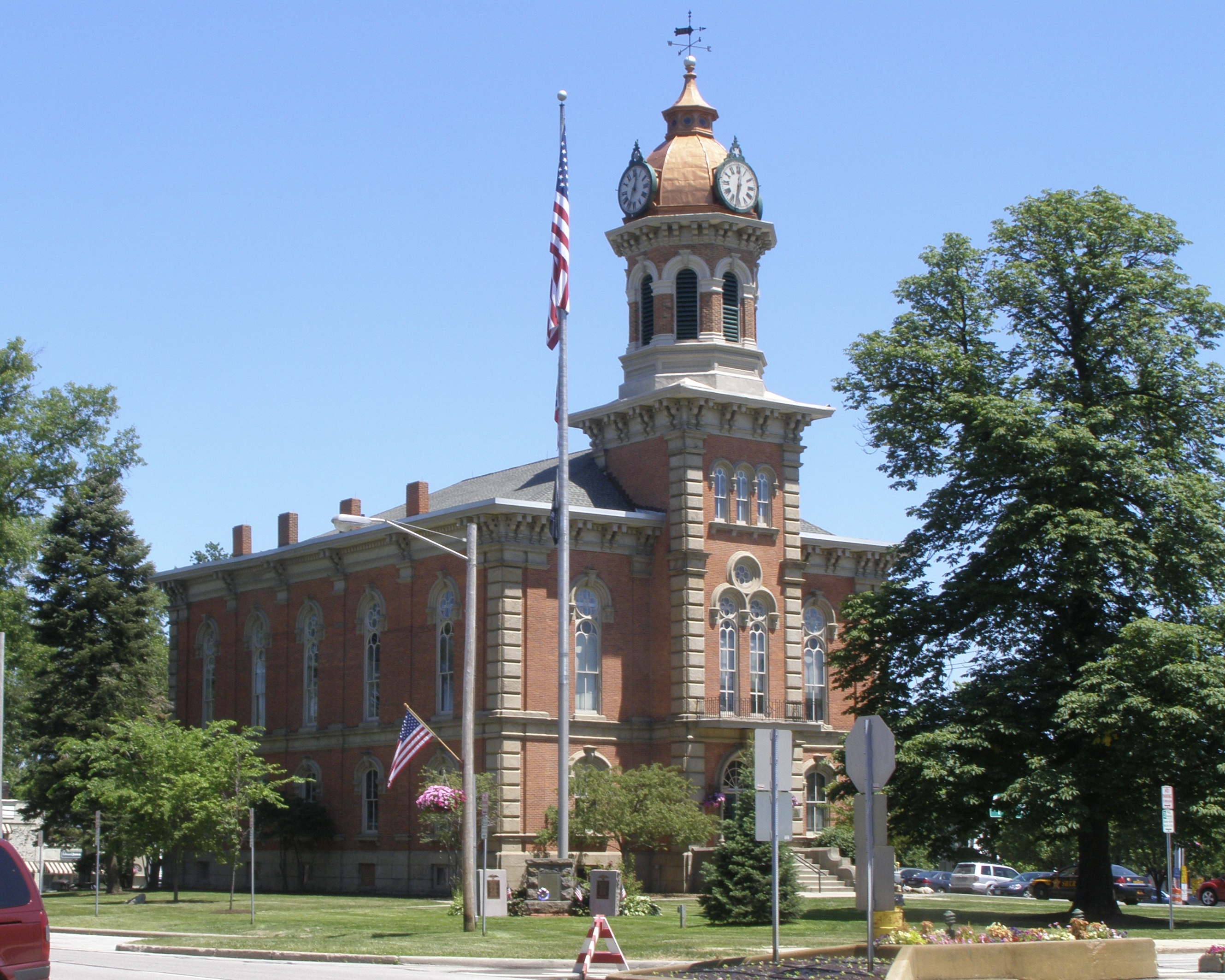
- Chardon Courthouse Square District
- Motto: "Home of the Geauga County Maple Festival"
- Interactive map of Chardon, Ohio
- Location within Ohio Location within the United States
- Coordinates: 41°34′47″N 81°12′25″W
- Country: United States
- State: Ohio
- County: Geauga
- Founded: 1812
- Incorporated: 1851
- City status: 2001

Government
  - Type: Council-manager
  - Mayor: Christopher Grau
  - Vice Mayor: Heather Means

Area
  - Total: 4.42 sq mi (11.46 km^{2})
  - Land: 4.39 sq mi (11.37 km^{2})
  - Water: 0.035 sq mi (0.09 km^{2})
- Elevation: 1,240 ft (380 m)

Population (2020)
  - Total: 5,242
  - Estimate (2023): 5,239
  - Density: 1,193.8/sq mi (460.93/km^{2})
- Time zone: UTC-5 (Eastern (EST))
  - Summer (DST): UTC-4 (EDT)
- ZIP code: 44024
- Area codes: 440 and 436
- FIPS code: 39-13554
- GNIS feature ID: 2397604
- Website: cityofchardon.gov

Chardon (/ˈʃɑːrdən/ SHAR-dən) is a city in Geauga County, Ohio, United States, and its county seat. The population was 5,242 at the 2020 census. Chardon is located about 10 mi (16 km) south of Lake Erie within the "snow belt" of the Great Lakes and is part of the Cleveland metropolitan area. It is the only incorporated city in Geauga County and includes land that was once part of Chardon, Hambden, and Munson townships.

== History ==
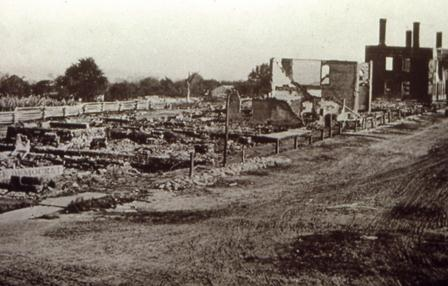
Main Street after the fire of 1868

Chardon is named after Peter Chardon Brooks, who donated land to build Chardon Square. Chardon Township celebrates its establishment in 1812, and thus the city of Chardon does the same. The city was incorporated as a village in 1851 and became a city in 2001 after its population passed 5,000 people in the 2000 United States census.

On July 24–25, 1868, a large fire destroyed the center of uptown, the area now known as Chardon Square. The fire originated in the Parlin Parkin's grocery store, and spread rapidly. By the time the fire was contained, the courthouse, post office, and many stores on the square were destroyed. Damage was estimated at around $120,000. Chardon Square was quickly rebuilt following the fire. A new county courthouse, which still stands today, was completed in 1869. Many other buildings that were constructed after the fire also survive and are used today.

=== School shooting ===
On February 27, 2012, a student from Lake Academy in Willoughby, Ohio, opened fire at the Chardon High School cafeteria, killing three and injuring two students. Daniel Parmertor, 16 years old, was killed at the time of the shooting. Two other victims, Demetrius Hewlin and Russell King, Jr., were pronounced dead on February 28. The shooter was taken into custody by police and was charged with three counts of aggravated murder. He was sentenced to three consecutive life terms in prison without parole.

== Geography ==
Chardon is located on U.S. Route 6 about 15 miles (24 km) east of Cleveland. According to the United States Census Bureau, the city has a total area of 4.62 square miles (11.97 km^{2}), of which 4.58 square miles (11.86 km^{2}) is land and 0.04 square miles (0.10 km^{2}) or about 25 acres (10 ha) is water.

=== Climate ===
With an average annual snowfall of 107 inches (272 cm), Chardon is notable for being the snowiest city in Ohio. This is mainly due to its location on a 730-foot (223 m) ridge approximately 10 miles (16 km) inland from Lake Erie, creating the perfect conditions for orographic lift and its associated heavy snowfall when winter winds blow across the lake.

In 1996, from November 9 through November 13, a storm dropped over 70 inches (178 cm) of lake-effect snow in the city over a period of six days. Governor George Voinovich declared a state of emergency as a result, and the Ohio National Guard was brought in to assist with the cleanup.

Chardon has a humid continental climate (Dfb). Summer days are warm to hot while nights remain cool. Summer is also the rainiest time of the year. Winters are moderately long, cold, and very snowy. Precipitation peaks during the month of August.

Climate data for Chardon, Ohio, 1991–2020 normals, extremes 1945–present
Month	Jan	Feb	Mar	Apr	May	Jun	Jul	Aug	Sep	Oct	Nov	Dec	Year
Record high °F (°C)	70 (21)	73 (23)	82 (28)	88 (31)	92 (33)	100 (38)	98 (37)	97 (36)	98 (37)	87 (31)	80 (27)	73 (23)	100 (38)
Mean maximum °F (°C)	56.6 (13.7)	58.2 (14.6)	69.0 (20.6)	79.7 (26.5)	85.5 (29.7)	90.0 (32.2)	90.9 (32.7)	89.7 (32.1)	87.1 (30.6)	78.3 (25.7)	67.9 (19.9)	58.4 (14.7)	92.2 (33.4)
Mean daily maximum °F (°C)	32.5 (0.3)	35.0 (1.7)	43.8 (6.6)	57.6 (14.2)	68.7 (20.4)	77.2 (25.1)	81.0 (27.2)	79.5 (26.4)	73.0 (22.8)	60.8 (16.0)	48.3 (9.1)	37.6 (3.1)	57.9 (14.4)
Daily mean °F (°C)	24.6 (−4.1)	25.8 (−3.4)	34.0 (1.1)	46.2 (7.9)	57.2 (14.0)	66.2 (19.0)	70.0 (21.1)	68.4 (20.2)	61.9 (16.6)	50.7 (10.4)	40.1 (4.5)	30.8 (−0.7)	48.0 (8.9)
Mean daily minimum °F (°C)	16.8 (−8.4)	16.5 (−8.6)	24.2 (−4.3)	34.8 (1.6)	45.7 (7.6)	55.1 (12.8)	59.1 (15.1)	57.3 (14.1)	50.8 (10.4)	40.6 (4.8)	31.9 (−0.1)	24.0 (−4.4)	38.1 (3.4)
Mean minimum °F (°C)	−5.9 (−21.1)	−4.8 (−20.4)	3.1 (−16.1)	21.6 (−5.8)	31.2 (−0.4)	40.3 (4.6)	47.7 (8.7)	46.3 (7.9)	38.0 (3.3)	28.3 (−2.1)	17.4 (−8.1)	5.6 (−14.7)	−9.7 (−23.2)
Record low °F (°C)	−23 (−31)	−29 (−34)	−18 (−28)	5 (−15)	22 (−6)	30 (−1)	38 (3)	33 (1)	25 (−4)	15 (−9)	−2 (−19)	−21 (−29)	−29 (−34)
Average precipitation inches (mm)	4.19 (106)	3.14 (80)	3.69 (94)	4.29 (109)	4.41 (112)	4.55 (116)	4.72 (120)	4.13 (105)	4.52 (115)	4.47 (114)	4.29 (109)	4.31 (109)	50.71 (1,289)
Average snowfall inches (cm)	34.4 (87)	23.4 (59)	16.5 (42)	4.0 (10)	0.0 (0.0)	0.0 (0.0)	0.0 (0.0)	0.0 (0.0)	0.0 (0.0)	0.6 (1.5)	9.3 (24)	25.5 (65)	113.7 (288.5)
Average extreme snow depth inches (cm)	13.4 (34)	12.2 (31)	8.7 (22)	2.1 (5.3)	0.0 (0.0)	0.0 (0.0)	0.0 (0.0)	0.0 (0.0)	0.0 (0.0)	0.6 (1.5)	5.6 (14)	9.8 (25)	18.6 (47)
Average precipitation days (≥ 0.01 in)	20.0	15.6	13.8	14.3	14.1	12.7	11.4	10.7	11.2	13.8	14.9	17.6	170.1
Average snowy days (≥ 0.1 in)	15.0	10.9	6.0	1.7	0.0	0.0	0.0	0.0	0.0	0.3	3.8	9.8	47.5
Source: NOAA

== Demographics ==
Historical population
Census	Pop.	Note	%±
1830	381		—
1840	446		17.1%
1850	546		22.4%
1860	582		6.6%
1870	885		52.1%
1880	1,081		22.1%
1890	1,084		0.3%
1900	1,360		25.5%
1910	1,542		13.4%
1920	1,566		1.6%
1930	1,818		16.1%
1940	2,001		10.1%
1950	2,478		23.8%
1960	3,154		27.3%
1970	3,991		26.5%
1980	4,434		11.1%
1990	4,446		0.3%
2000	5,156		16.0%
2010	5,148		−0.2%
2020	5,242		1.8%
2023 (est.)	5,239		−0.1%

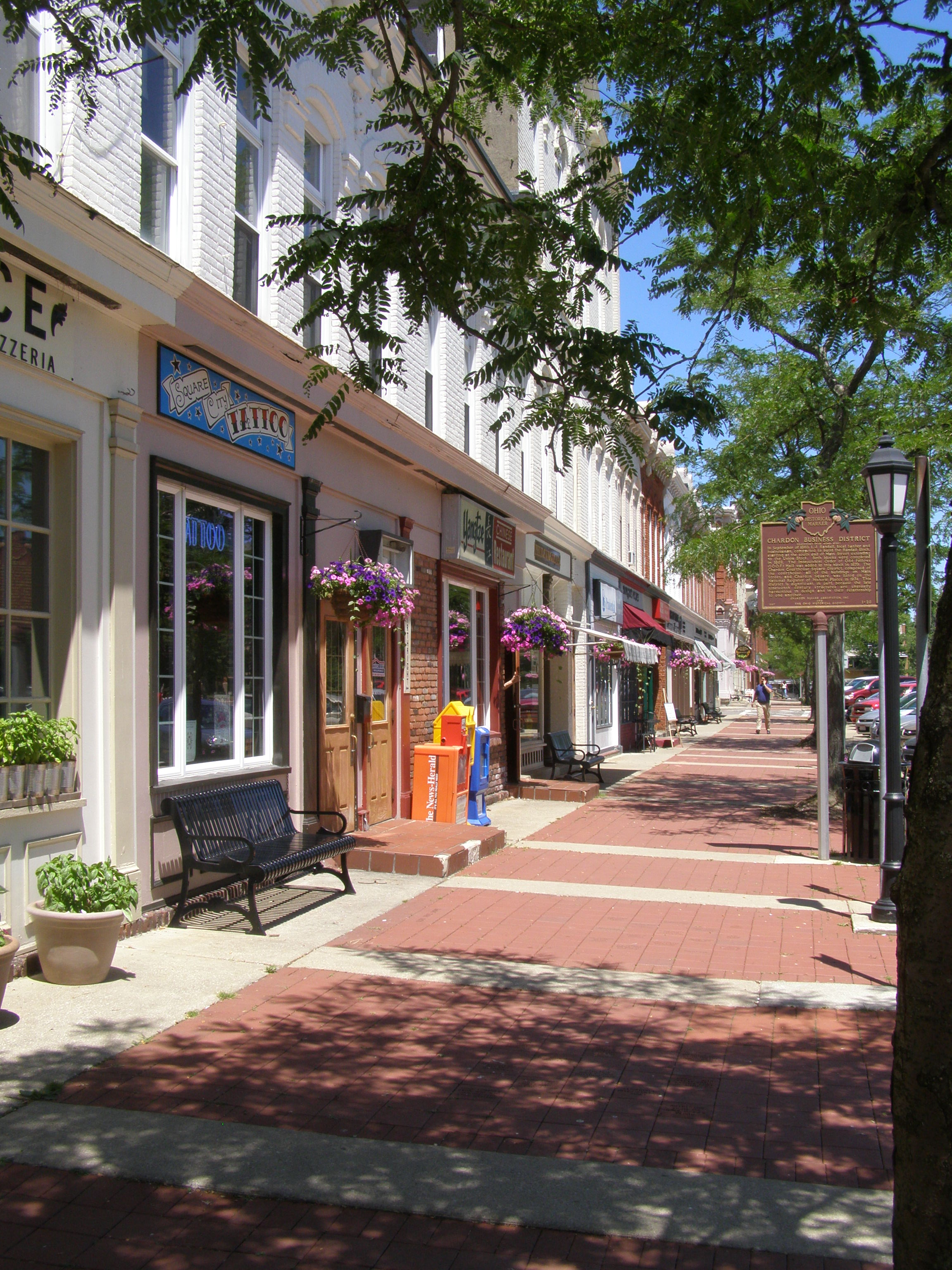
Downtown Chardon

As of the census of 2000, there were 5,156 people, 2,147 households, and 1,344 families residing in the city. The population density was 1,120.1 inhabitants per square mile (432.5/km^{2}). There were 2,271 housing units at an average density of 493.3 per square mile (190.5/km^{2}). The racial makeup of the city was 97.77% White, 0.43% African American, 0.02% Native American, 0.45% Asian, 0.02% Pacific Islander, 0.10% from other races, and 1.22% from two or more races. Hispanic or Latino of any race were 0.47% of the population.

There were 2,147 households, out of which 30.5% had children under the age of 18 living with them, 49.7% were married couples living together, 9.9% had a female householder with no husband present, and 37.4% were non-families. 32.9% of all households were made up of individuals, and 13.7% had someone living alone who was 65 years of age or older. The average household size was 2.35 and the average family size was 3.02.

In the city the population was spread out, with 24.9% under the age of 18, 6.9% from 18 to 24, 29.9% from 25 to 44, 22.5% from 45 to 64, and 15.8% who were 65 years of age or older. The median age was 37 years. For every 100 females, there were 84.9 males. For every 100 females age 18 and over, there were 79.3 males.

The median income for a household in the city was $54,063, and the median income for a family was $57,845. Males had a median income of $44,071 versus $23,750 for females. The per capita income for the city was $21,845. About 1.3% of families and 3.8% of the population were below the poverty line, including 0.6% of those under age 18 and 7.8% of those age 65 or over.

=== 2020 census ===
As of the 2020 census, Chardon had a population of 5,242. The median age was 45.5 years; 20.2% of residents were under the age of 18 and 23.6% of residents were 65 years of age or older. For every 100 females there were 84.3 males, and for every 100 females age 18 and over there were 80.7 males age 18 and over.

99.4% of residents lived in urban areas, while 0.6% lived in rural areas.

There were 2,383 households, of which 24.8% had children under the age of 18 living in them. Of all households, 38.9% were married-couple households, 19.7% were households with a male householder and no spouse or partner present, and 35.9% were households with a female householder and no spouse or partner present. About 40.7% of all households were made up of individuals and 18.3% had someone living alone who was 65 years of age or older.

There were 2,536 housing units, of which 6.0% were vacant. Among occupied housing units, 62.1% were owner-occupied and 37.9% were renter-occupied. The homeowner vacancy rate was 1.0% and the rental vacancy rate was 7.6%.

Racial composition as of the 2020 census
Race	Number	Percent
White	4,888	93.2%
Black or African American	56	1.1%
American Indian and Alaska Native	3	0.1%
Asian	53	1.0%
Native Hawaiian and Other Pacific Islander	1	<0.1%
Some other race	31	0.6%
Two or more races	210	4.0%
Hispanic or Latino (of any race)	111	2.1%

The median household income was $86,618, with a per capita income of $54,895. Approximately 10.02% of the population were below the poverty line.

=== 2010 census ===
As of the census of 2010, there were 5,148 people, 2,285 households, and 1,331 families residing in the city. The population density was 1,124.0 inhabitants per square mile (434.0/km^{2}). There were 2,457 housing units at an average density of 536.5 per square mile (207.1/km^{2}). The racial makeup of the city was 96.9% White, 0.8% Black, 0.2% Native American, 0.6% Asian, 0.2% from other races, and 1.3% from two or more races. Hispanic or Latino of any race were 1.5% of the population.

There were 2,285 households, of which 29.1% had children under the age of 18 living with them, 42.1% were married couples living together, 12.2% had a female householder with no husband present, 3.9% had a male householder with no wife present, and 41.8% were non-families. 37.4% of all households were made up of individuals, and 15.8% had someone living alone who was 65 years of age or older. The average household size was 2.21 and the average family size was 2.94.

The median age in the city was 41.1 years. 23.5% of residents were under the age of 18; 7.4% were between the ages of 18 and 24; 24.8% were from 25 to 44; 26.5% were from 45 to 64; and 17.7% were 65 years of age or older. The gender makeup of the city was 45.1% male and 54.9% female.

== Culture ==
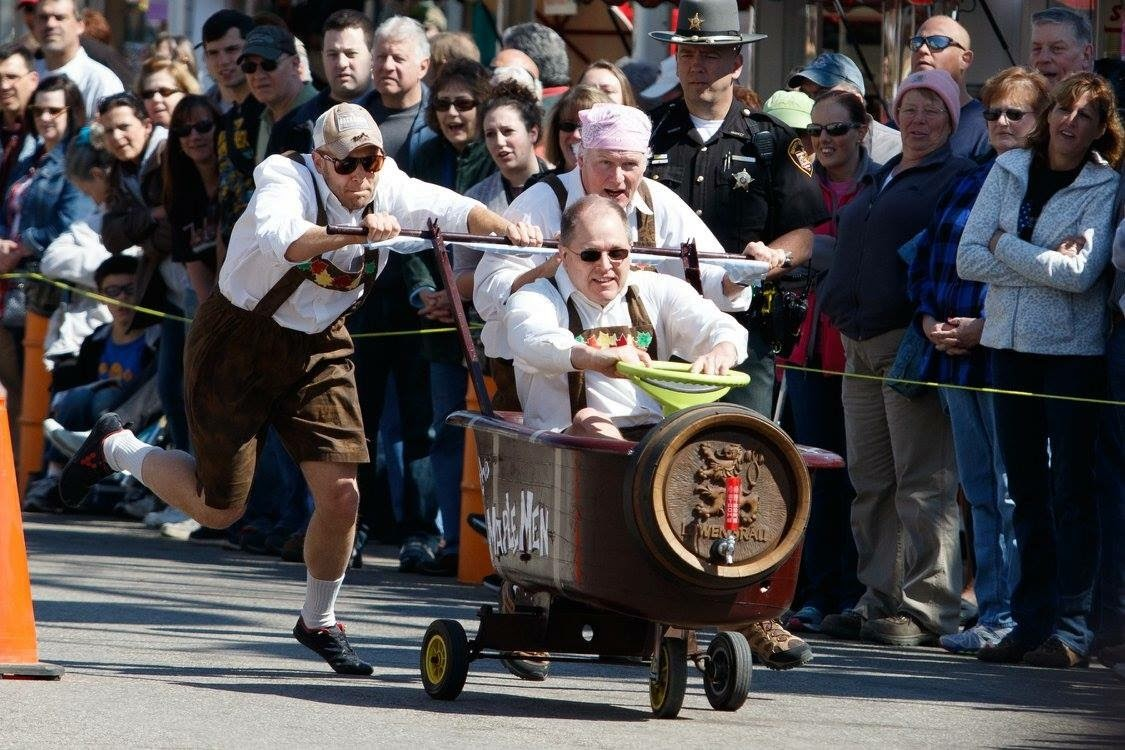
Bathtub races at the 2018 Geauga County Maple Festival

Chardon is known for its maple syrup industry. Celebration of the syrup season begins at Tapping Sunday in March, when the sap is at prime thawing temperature. The annual Geauga County Maple Festival is a four-day celebration that takes place on the Chardon Square the last weekend in April. The festival has been rescheduled numerous times because of snowstorms in April due to Chardon's location in the “snow belt” of the Great Lakes; it receives a large amount of snowfall every year.

Chardon has an active performance art community. The Geauga Lyric Theater Guild is housed in the renovated Geauga Theater building, which was constructed in 1939 as an Art Deco movie house. The theater is also being used again to show first-run movies.

Greater Chardon features numerous parks and golf courses. Chardon Lakes Golf Course is located in the heart of Chardon, two minutes from the square. Sand Ridge Golf Club in nearby Munson Township is also an excellent course. Chardon has an abundance of park space. Due to the area's varying weather conditions, sports activities are available for every season.

== Education ==
Chardon and the area surrounding the city are served by the Chardon Local School District. The district contains Chardon High School, as well as one middle school, and two elementary schools: Park and Munson. Hambden and Maple were no longer elementary schools starting in the 2018–2019 school year. Hambden and Munson elementary are not within the city limits. As of the 2011–2012 school year, the district had received an "Excellent" rating from the State of Ohio Board of Education for eleven consecutive years.

Chardon has a public library, a branch of the Geauga County Public Library.

== Notable people ==
- Andrew Brown, professional baseball pitcher
- Hector (Chef Boyardee) Boioardi, is buried in All Souls Cemetery in Chardon
- Mel Harder, professional baseball pitcher for the Cleveland Indians
- Matt Hutter, NASCAR driver
- Leroy Kemp, three-time World Champion in freestyle wrestling, three-time NCAA Champion at the University of Wisconsin
- Tom Kipp, international professional motorcycle racing champion
- Charles C. Paine, politician
- Halbert Eleazer Paine, Union general and U.S. Representative from Wisconsin
- Seth Ledyard Phelps, naval officer, politician and diplomat
- Christopher Robichaud, philosopher, Harvard University professor
- Nick Schuyler, author (Not Without Hope)
- JoAnn M. Tenorio, entomologist in Hawaii

=== Musical artists & groups ===
- Midnight Syndicate, neoclassical dark wave duo
- The Chardon Polka Band, Cleveland-Style polka band
