= Hathaway (Tannersville, New York) =

Historic house in New York, United States

- U.S. National Register of Historic Places
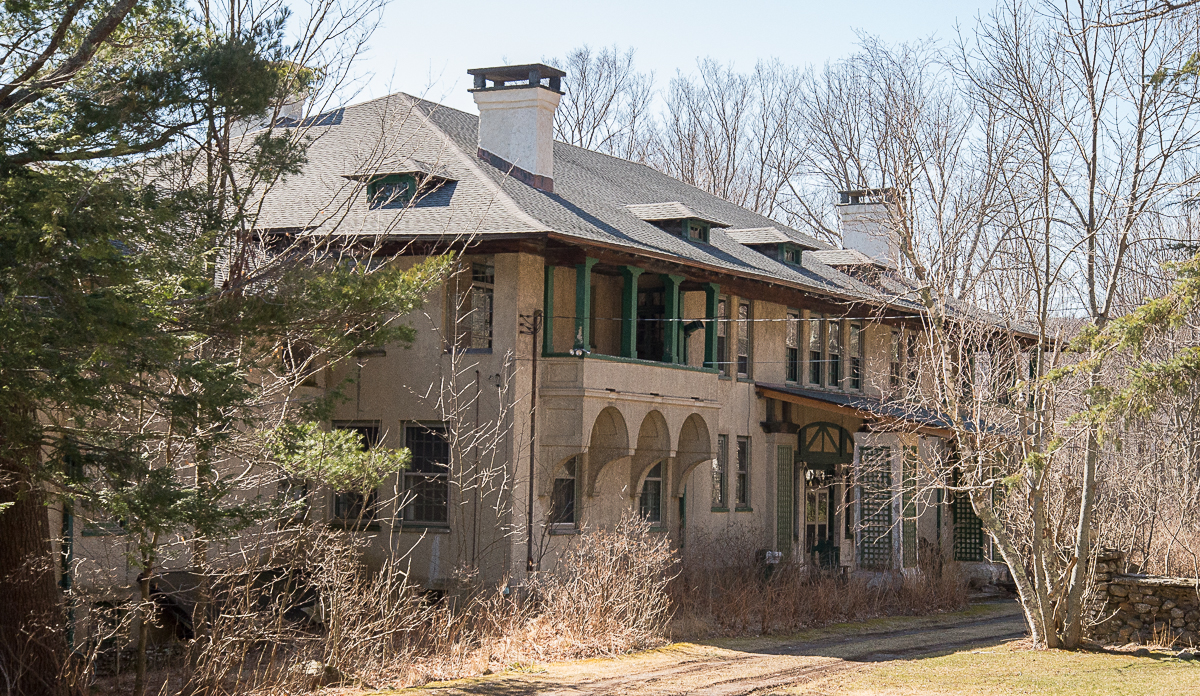

- Location within New York Location within the United States
- Interactive map showing the location of Hathaway
- Nearest city: 781 County Road 25, Tannersville, New York
- Coordinates: 42°13′27.3894″N 74°7′40.137″W
- Area: 206.5 acres (83.6 ha)
- Built: 1907
- Architect: Delano & Aldrich
- Architectural style: Late 19th And 20th Century Revivals
- NRHP reference No.: 08000023
- Added to NRHP: February 12, 2008

Hathaway, also known as V. Everit Macy and Edith Carpenter Macy Estate, is a historic estate house located at Tannersville in Greene County, New York. The house was built in 1907 and designed by architects Delano & Aldrich. It is a large, two story rectangular residence surmounted by a hipped roof with deep overhanging eaves and exposed rafters. It is constructed of concrete block coated in stucco. Also on the property are a carriage house, solarium, garage, and shed. A fishing cabin was once situated on the pond of the property, but is no longer standing. Hathaway was previously run as a Bed and Breakfast lodge, with prominent Broadway actress Maude Adams among its guests.

It was listed on the National Register of Historic Places in 2008.
