= Claridon Congregational Church =

Historic church in Ohio, United States

- U.S. National Register of Historic Places
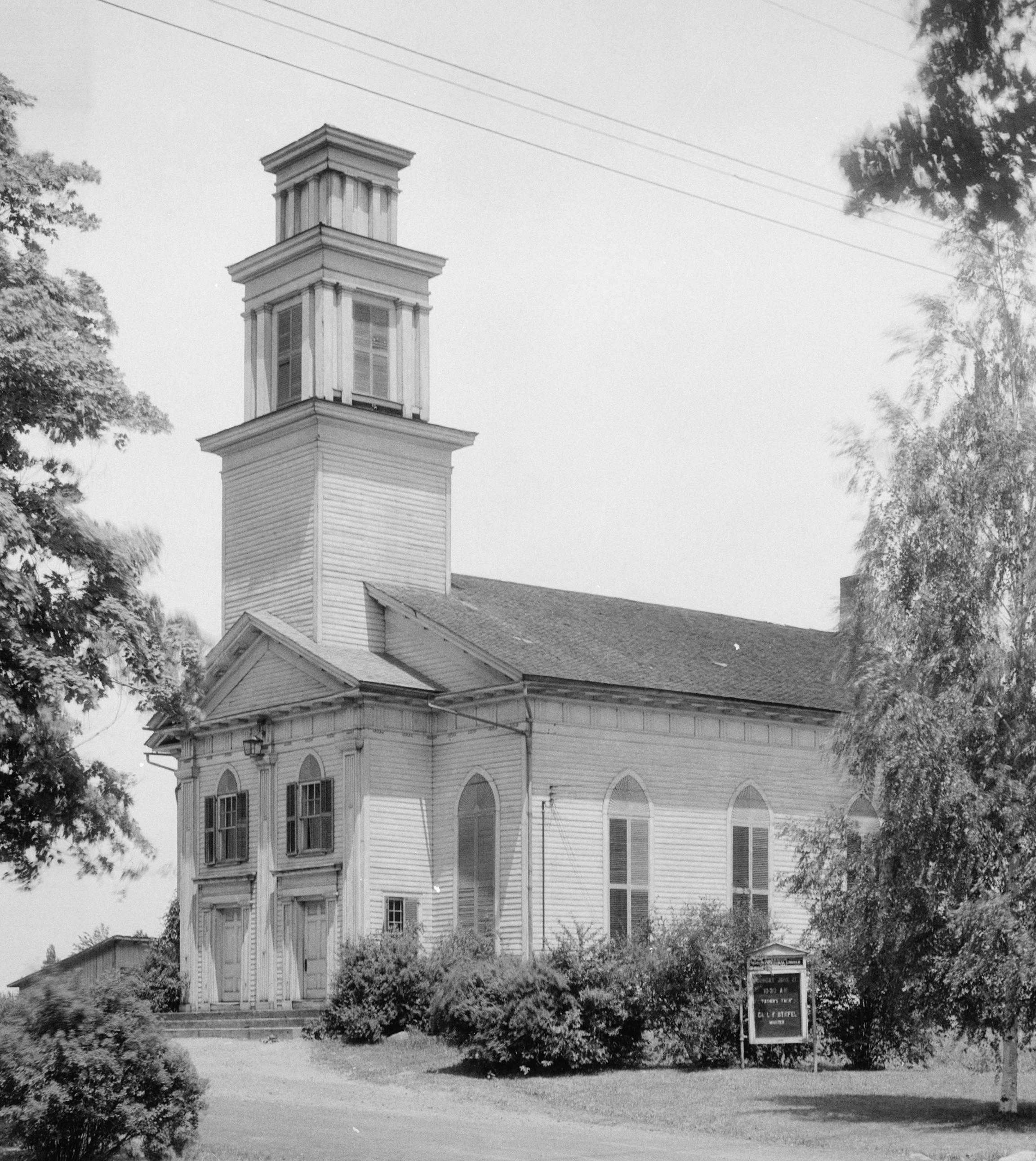

- Location within Ohio Location within the United States
- Location: U.S. 322, Claridon Township, Ohio
- Coordinates: 41°31′57″N 81°08′34″W
- Area: less than one acre
- Built: 1831
- Architectural style: Greek Revival
- NRHP reference No.: 74001503
- Added to NRHP: August 13, 1974

Claridon Congregational Church is a historic church building on U.S. Route 322 in Claridon Township in Geauga County, Ohio.

The Greek Revival meetinghouse was constructed in 1831 and added to the National Register of Historic Places in 1974. The congregation is currently affiliated with the United Church of Christ (UCC).
