= Chardon Courthouse Square District =

Historic district in Ohio, United States

- U.S. National Register of Historic Places
- U.S. Historic district
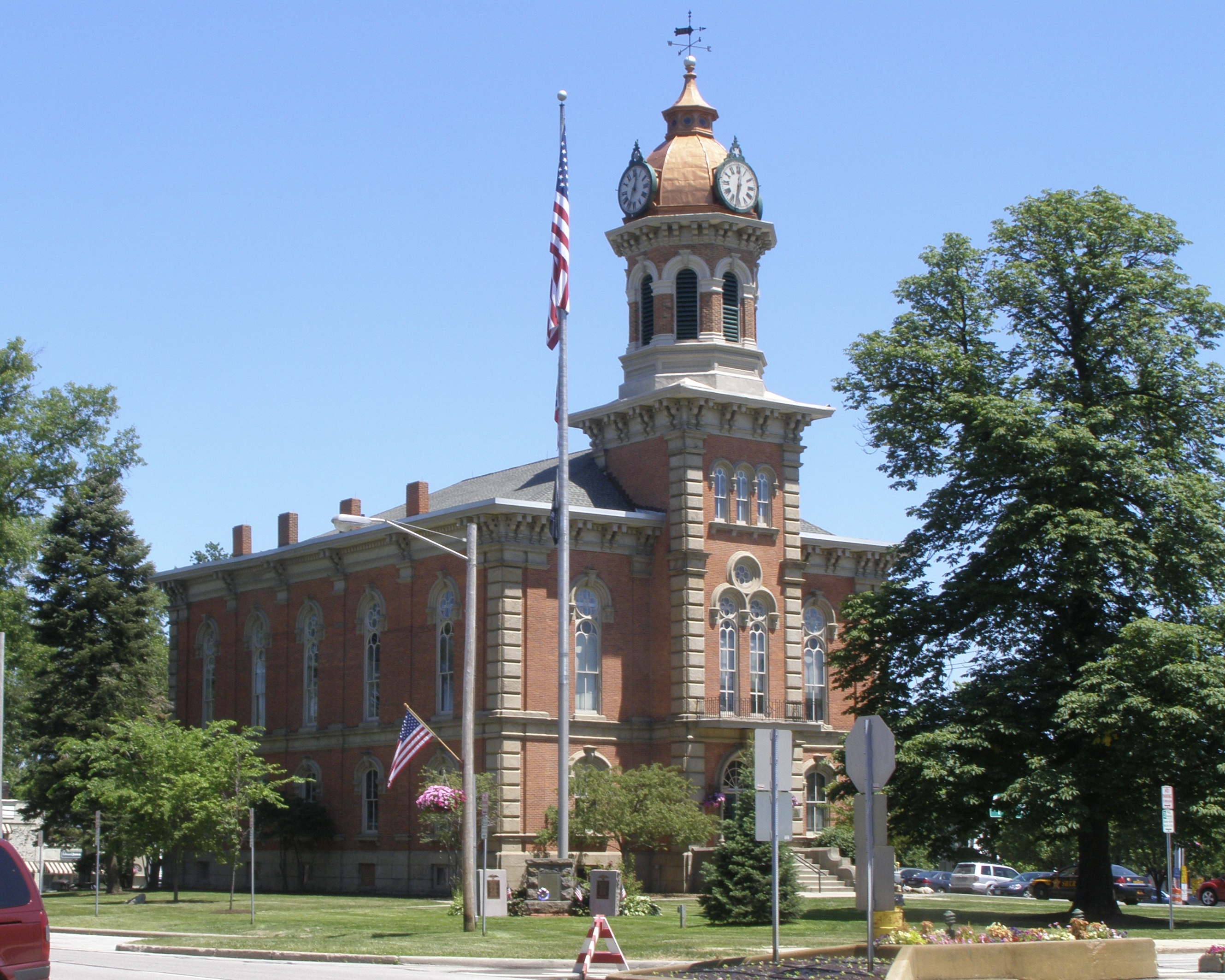
- The Geauga County Courthouse in Chardon, Ohio

- Location within Ohio Location within the United States
- Location: Public Green, roughly bounded by Main and Center Sts., Chardon, Ohio
- Coordinates: 41°34′56″N 81°12′14″W
- Built: 1868
- Architect: Herricks & Simmons; Herrick, Rensselaer R.
- Architectural style: Italianate, Gothic Revival
- NRHP reference No.: 74001502
- Added to NRHP: October 18, 1974

The Chardon Courthouse Square District is located in Chardon, Ohio, and contains the Geauga County Courthouse as well as the several buildings serving as the courthouse annexes. The district was added to the National Register on 1974-10-18.

The Chardon Courthouses Square District is a group of late 19th century buildings, most in a High Victorian Italianate Style. The district covers the public green, the county courthouse and two blocks of commercial buildings on the west side of the public green. The green is divided into a north unit and a south unit with the Geauga County Courthouse in the north unit.
