= Greater Cleveland =

Metropolitan Statistical Area in United States

- Metropolitan Statistical Area
- Cleveland, OH Metropolitan Statistical Area
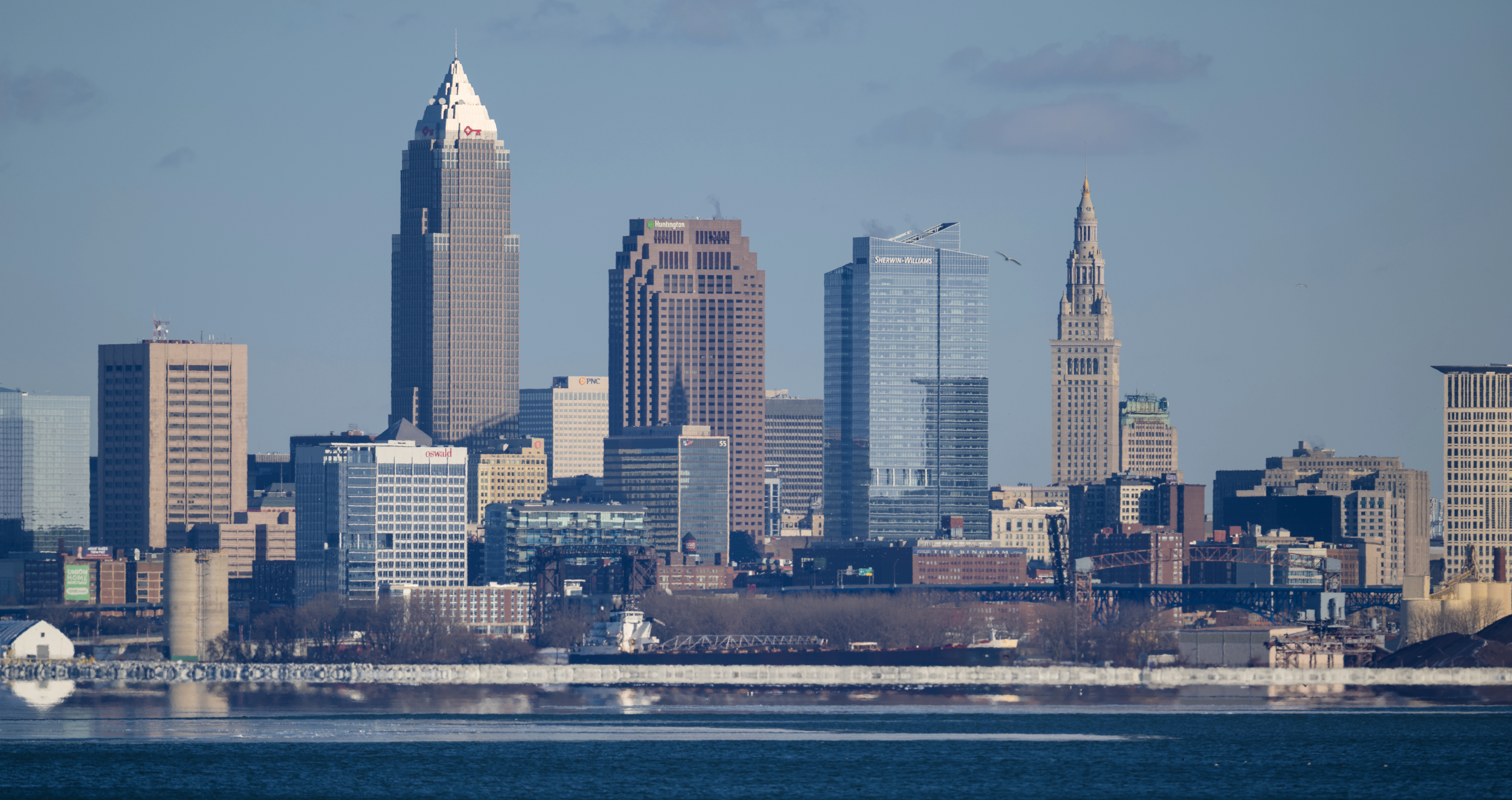
- Downtown Cleveland
Map of Cleveland–Akron–Canton, OH CSA
City of Cleveland
City of Akron
City of Canton
Cleveland MSA
Akron MSA
Canton–Massillon MSA
Wooster µSA
Sandusky MSA
New Philadelphia–Dover µSA
Fremont µSA
Norwalk µSA
Coshocton µSA
- Country: United States
- State: Ohio
- Largest city: Cleveland
- Other cities in MSA: List: Parma; Lorain; Elyria; Lakewood; Euclid; Mentor; Cleveland Heights

Population (2020)
  - MSA: 2,185,825 (33rd)
  - CSA: 3,769,834 (17th)

GDP
  - MSA: $162.8 billion (2022)
- Time zone: UTC−5 (EST)
  - Summer (DST): UTC−4 (EDT)
- Area codes: 216, 234, 330, 436, 440

The Cleveland metropolitan area, or Greater Cleveland, is the metropolitan area surrounding the city of Cleveland, Ohio, United States. The six-county Cleveland, OH Metropolitan Statistical Area (MSA) as defined by the Office of Management and Budget consists of Cuyahoga, Ashtabula, Geauga, Lake, Lorain, and Medina counties in northeast Ohio, with a total population of 2,165,775. This makes it the 35th-most populous metropolitan area in the United States and the third largest in Ohio.

The metro area is also part of the larger Cleveland-Akron-Canton, OH Combined Statistical Area, which, with over 3.7 million people, is the 17th most populous combined statistical area in the nation. Northeast Ohio refers to a larger region that includes Greater Cleveland, as well as metropolitan Akron, Canton, Youngstown, and surrounding rural areas. Greater Cleveland is part of what is known historically as the Connecticut Western Reserve.

== Northeast Ohio ==
Northeast Ohio consists of 16 counties (Ashland, Ashtabula, Carroll, Columbiana, Cuyahoga, Geauga, Lake, Lorain, Mahoning, Medina, Portage, Richland, Stark, Summit, Trumbull and Wayne counties) and includes the cities of Akron, Ashland, Ashtabula, Brunswick, Canton, Cleveland, Elyria, Lorain, Mansfield, Medina, Wadsworth, Wooster, Warren, and Youngstown. Northeast Ohio is home to approximately 4 million people, has a labor force of almost 2 million, and a gross regional product of nearly $170 billion. Other counties are sometimes considered to be in Northeast Ohio. These include Erie, Holmes, Huron and Tuscarawas counties, and their inclusion makes the total population of the entire northeastern section of Ohio well over 4.5 million people.

== Cities, townships, and villages ==
=== Cuyahoga County ===
- Bay Village
- Beachwood
- Bedford
- Bedford Heights
- Bentleyville
- Berea
- Bratenahl
- Brecksville
- Broadview Heights
- Brook Park
- Brooklyn
- Brooklyn Heights
- Chagrin Falls
- Chagrin Falls Township
- Cleveland
- Cleveland Heights
- Cuyahoga Heights
- East Cleveland
- Euclid
- Fairview Park
- Garfield Heights
- Gates Mills
- Glenwillow
- Highland Heights
- Highland Hills
- Hunting Valley
- Independence
- Lakewood
- Linndale
- Lyndhurst
- Maple Heights
- Mayfield Heights
- Mayfield Village
- Middleburg Heights
- Moreland Hills
- Newburgh Heights
- North Olmsted
- North Randall
- North Royalton
- Oakwood Village
- Olmsted Falls
- Olmsted Township
- Orange
- Parma
- Parma Heights
- Pepper Pike
- Richmond Heights
- Rocky River
- Seven Hills
- Shaker Heights
- Solon
- South Euclid
- Strongsville
- University Heights
- Valley View
- Walton Hills
- Warrensville Heights
- Westlake
- Woodmere

=== Ashtabula County ===
- Andover
- Andover Township
- Ashtabula
- Ashtabula Township
- Austinburg Township
- Cherry Valley Township
- Colebrook Township
- Conneaut
- Conneaut Township
- Denmark Township
- Dorset Township
- Geneva
- Geneva-on-the-Lake
- Geneva Township
- Harpersfield Township
- Hartsgrove Township
- Jefferson
- Jefferson Township
- Kingsville Township
- Lenox Township
- Monroe Township
- Morgan Township
- New Lyme Township
- North Kingsville
- Orwell
- Orwell Township
- Pierpont Township
- Plymouth Township
- Richmond Township
- Roaming Shores
- Rock Creek
- Rome Township
- Saybrook Township
- Sheffield Township
- Trumbull Township
- Wayne Township
- Williamsfield Township
- Windsor Township

=== Geauga County ===
- Auburn Township
- Bainbridge Township
- Burton
- Burton Township
- Chardon
- Chardon Township
- Chester
- Chesterland
- Claridon Township
- Hambden Township
- Hunting Valley (part)
- Huntsburg Township
- Middlefield
- Middlefield Township
- Montville Township
- Munson Township
- Newbury Township
- Parkman Township
- Russell Township
- South Russell
- Thompson Township
- Troy Township

=== Lake County ===
- Concord Township
- Eastlake
- Fairport Harbor
- Grand River
- Kirtland
- Kirtland Hills
- Lakeline
- LeRoy Township
- Madison
- Madison Township
- Mentor
- Mentor-on-the-Lake
- North Madison
- North Perry
- Painesville
- Painesville Township
- Perry
- Perry Township
- Timberlake
- Waite Hill
- Wickliffe
- Willoughby
- Willoughby Hills
- Willowick

=== Lorain County ===
- Amherst
- Amherst Township
- Avon
- Avon Lake
- Brighton Township
- Brownhelm Township
- Camden Township
- Carlisle Township
- Columbia Township
- Eaton Estates
- Eaton Township
- Elyria
- Elyria Township
- Grafton
- Grafton Township
- Henrietta Township
- Huntington Township
- Kipton
- Lagrange
- LaGrange Township
- Lorain
- New Russia Township
- North Ridgeville
- Oberlin
- Penfield Township
- Pittsfield Township
- Rochester
- Rochester Township
- Sheffield
- Sheffield Lake
- Sheffield Township
- South Amherst
- Vermilion (portions in Erie and Lorain Counties)
- Wellington
- Wellington Township

=== Medina County ===
- Brunswick
- Brunswick Hills Township
- Chatham Township
- Chippewa Lake
- Creston
- Gloria Glens Park
- Granger Township
- Guilford Township
- Harrisville Township
- Hinckley Township
- Homer Township
- Lafayette Township
- Litchfield Township
- Liverpool Township
- Lodi
- Medina
- Medina Township
- Montville Township
- Rittman
- Seville
- Sharon Township
- Spencer
- Spencer Township
- Wadsworth
- Wadsworth Township
- Westfield Center
- Westfield Township
- York Township

=== Cities by population ===
These, in decreasing order of population, are the 10 largest cities in Greater Cleveland of (2020):

City	2020 population
Cleveland	372,624
Parma	81,146
Lorain	65,211
Elyria	52,656
Lakewood	50,942
Euclid	49,692
Mentor	47,450
Strongsville	46,491
Cleveland Heights	45,312
North Ridgeville	35,280
Westlake	34,228

== Demographics ==
Historical population
Year	Pop.	±%
1850	159,874	—
1860	193,501	+21.0%
1870	245,052	+26.6%
1880	321,638	+31.3%
1890	447,386	+39.1%
1900	603,807	+35.0%
1910	834,204	+38.2%
1920	1,169,422	+40.2%
1930	1,466,057	+25.4%
1940	1,500,798	+2.4%
1950	1,759,431	+17.2%
1960	2,220,050	+26.2%
1970	2,419,274	+9.0%
1980	2,277,949	−5.8%
1990	2,202,069	−3.3%
2000	2,250,871	+2.2%
2010	2,178,737	−3.2%
2020	2,185,825	+0.3%
2022*	2,160,145	−1.2%
* = Population estimate. Source: U.S. Decennial Census

According to the 2020 United States Census, the population was 2.186 million in the then-five-county MSA of the Greater Cleveland Area, making it the second largest metropolitan-statistical area entirely within the state of Ohio. Approximately 48.1% of the population was male and 51.9% were female. In 2010 the racial makeup of the five-county Area was 71.7% (1,490,074) Non-Hispanic Whites, 19.7% (409,582) Blacks or African Americans, 0.2% (4,056) American Indians and Alaskan Natives, 2.0% (40,522) Asian (0.7% Asian Indian 0.5% Chinese 0.2% Filipino, 0.1% Korean, 0.1% Vietnamese, 0.1% Japanese, 0.0% (398) Pacific Islander, 1.7% (35,224) from other races, and 2.0% (42,130) from two or more races. 4.7% (98,133) of the population were Hispanic or Latino of any race (2.8% Puerto Rican, 1.0% Mexican, 0.1% Dominican, and 0.1% Cuban).

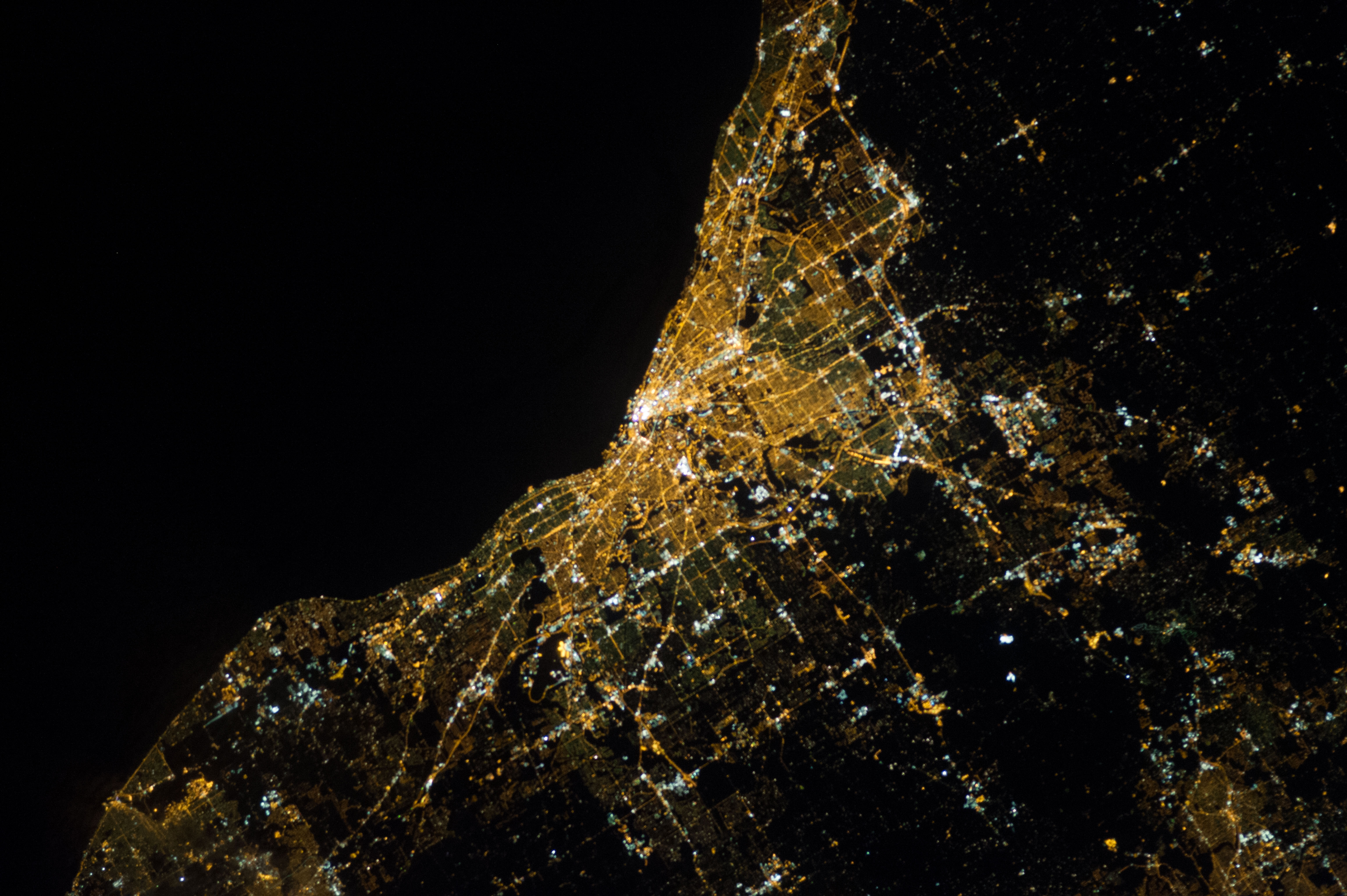
NASA satellite photograph of Cleveland at night

The median income for a household in Greater Cleveland was $46,231 and the median income for a family, $59,611. The per capita income was $25,668. Persons living below the poverty line was 15.1%. According to a study by Capgemini and the World Wealth Report by Merrill Lynch, the Cleveland area has nearly 54,000 millionaire households, and is expected to continue to grow at 17% over the next five years.

The Greater Cleveland area is the most diverse region in the state of Ohio and is becoming increasingly more diverse with new waves of immigration. As of 2010, both the Hispanic and Asian population in the Cleveland-Akron-Ashtabula area grew by almost 40%, Hispanics now number at 112,307 (up from 80,738 in 2000). The Asian population alone accounts for 55,087 (up from 39,586 in 2000) but people who cite Asian and other ethnicities enumerate 67,231. The Chinese Americans are the oldest Asian group residing in Northeast Ohio, most visible in Cleveland's Asiatown. Nevertheless, the area is also home to hundreds of Indians, Thais, Taiwanese, Pakistanis, Laotians, Cambodians, and Burmese peoples as well.

The Cleveland area has a substantial African American population with origins in the First and Second Great Migrations. It also boasts some of the nation's largest Irish, Italian (numbering over 205,000), Slavic, and Hungarian populations. At one time, the Hungarian population of Cleveland proper was so great that the city boasted of having the highest concentration of Hungarians in the world outside of Budapest. Today, the Greater Cleveland area is home to the largest Slovak, Slovene, and Hungarian communities in the world, outside of Slovakia, Slovenia, and Hungary respectively. The Slavic population of the Cleveland-Akron area comprises 17.2%, far higher than the nation's rate of 6%. There are 171,000 Poles, 38,000 Slovaks, 66,000 Slovenes, 38,000 Czechs, 31,000 Russians, and 23,000 Ukrainians in Greater Cleveland. Slavic Village and Tremont historically had some of the largest concentrations of Eastern Europeans within Cleveland proper. Today, both neighborhoods continue to be home to many Slavic Ohioans. In addition, Slovenia maintains a consulate-general in Downtown Cleveland. The city of Cleveland has also received visits from the Presidents of Hungary and Poland.

Greater Cleveland is home to a sizable Jewish community. According to the North American Jewish Data Bank, the community comprises an estimated 100,000 people or 4.6% as of 2023, above the nation's 1.7%, and up from 81,500 in 1996. The highest proportion is in Cuyahoga County at 5.5% (of the county's total population). Today, 23% of Greater Cleveland's Jewish population is under the age of 17, and 27% reside in the Heights area (Cleveland Heights, Shaker Heights, and University Heights). In 2010, nearly 2,600 people spoke Hebrew and 1,100 Yiddish.

County	2025 estimate	2020 Census	Change	Area	Density
Cuyahoga County	1,232,925	1,264,817	−2.52%	457.19 sq mi (1,184.1 km^{2})	2,697/sq mi (1,041/km^{2})
Lorain County	323,219	312,964	+3.28%	491.10 sq mi (1,271.9 km^{2})	658/sq mi (254/km^{2})
Lake County	232,217	232,603	−0.17%	227.49 sq mi (589.2 km^{2})	1,021/sq mi (394/km^{2})
Medina County	185,025	182,470	+1.40%	421.36 sq mi (1,091.3 km^{2})	439/sq mi (170/km^{2})
Ashtabula County	96,713	97,574	−0.88%	702 sq mi (1,820 km^{2})	138/sq mi (53/km^{2})
Geauga County	95,676	95,397	+0.29%	400.16 sq mi (1,036.4 km^{2})	239/sq mi (92/km^{2})
Total	2,165,775	2,185,825	−0.92%	2,747.81 sq mi (7,116.8 km^{2})	788/sq mi (304/km^{2})

=== Ancestry ===
The top largest ancestries in the Greater Cleveland MSA, were the following:

- German: 20.4%
- Slavic: 18.9% (8.2% Polish, 3.2% Slovene, 1.8% Slovak, 1.5% Czech, 1.5% Russian, 1.1% Ukrainian, 1.0% Croatian, 0.4% Serbian, Rusyn, Yugoslav)
- Irish: 14.5%
- British: 11.3% (8.0% English, 1.8% Scottish, 0.8% Scot-Irish, 0.7% Welsh)
- Italian: 9.9%
- Jewish 4.6%
- Hungarian: 3.7%
- Puerto Rican: 2.8%
- French and French Canadian: 1.9%
- Scandinavian: 1.2% (0.7% Swedish, 0.3% Norwegian, and Danish)

=== Place of birth ===
Approximately 94.1% of the metropolitan area's population was native to the United States. Approximately 92.8% were born in the U.S. while 1.3% were born in Puerto Rico, a U.S. territory, or born abroad to American parents. The rest of the population (5.9%) were foreign-born. The highest percentages of immigrants came from Europe (46.2%), Asia (32.7%), Latin America (14.3%); smaller percentages of newcomers came from Africa (3.6%), other parts of North America (3.0%), and Oceania (0.3%).

According to the American Community Survey 2006–2010, the number of Greater Cleveland area residents born overseas was 119,136 and the leading countries of origin were India (10,067), China (7,756), Mexico (6,051), Ukraine (7,211), Germany (5,742), Italy (4,114), Canada (4,102), United Kingdom (4,048), Romania (3,947), Poland (3,834), Russia (3,826), and Yugoslavia (3,820).

=== Languages ===
English is by far the most commonly spoken language at home by residents in the Cleveland-Akron-Elyria area; approximately 91.2% of the population over the age of five spoke only English at home. Spanish speakers made up 2.8% of the population; speakers of Asian languages made up 1.1% of the population; speakers of other Indo-European languages made up 3.9% of the population. Individuals who spoke languages other than the ones above represented the remaining 1.0% of the populace. As of 2011, individually in addition to English, 2.7% spoke Spanish, 0.6% German, 0.5% Arabic, and 0.5% Chinese. 1.4% also spoke a Slavic language. In 2007, Cleveland area was home to the nation's 3rd highest proportion of Hungarian speakers.

== Politics ==
2024 precinct by precinct presidential election results in Greater Cleveland Area

The Cleveland metropolitan area has traditionally been a Democratic stronghold but has shown a trend toward the Republican Party in recent years, particularly since Donald Trump became the Republican nominee. This shift has been driven largely by gains among working-class voters in the region. However, the metro area remains reliably Democratic overall.

Cleveland Metro presidential election results
Year	Democratic	Republican	Third parties
2024	54.3% 580,795	44.8% 479,193	0.8% 8,667
2020	55.8% 624,855	43.0% 481,128	1.2% 13,358
2016	55.4% 576,945	40.7% 423,639	3.8% 40,005
2012	62.1% 668,743	37.9% 407,802	0% 0

== Area codes ==
In the 1950s, AT&T assigned Greater Cleveland Area code 216, which included all of Northeast Ohio. In 1996, Area code 216 was reduced in size to cover the northern half of its prior area, centering on Cleveland and its lake shore suburbs. Area code 330 was introduced for the southern half of Greater Cleveland, including Medina County. The western half of the region, including Ashland and Richland counties, and parts of Huron, Wayne, and Erie counties, are assigned area codes 419 and 567.

In 1997, area code 216 was further split as the need for additional phone numbers grew. Area code 216 was reduced in geographical area to cover the city of Cleveland and its inner ring suburbs. Area code 440 was introduced to cover the remainder of was what previously area code 216, including all of Lorain, Geauga, and Lake counties, and parts of Cuyahoga County. Some communities, such as Parma, and Parma Heights were divided between the 216 and 440 area codes. In 1999, Congressman Dennis Kucinich introduced federal legislation to protect small and medium-sized cities from being split into two or more area codes.

In 2000, it was anticipated that the available phone numbers in area code 330 would be exhausted, and an overlay area code was introduced. Area code 234 was assigned to overlap existing area code 330. With the creation of area code 234, any new phone number in the geographical area formerly covered by area code 330 could be assigned a phone number in either the 234 or 330 area codes, with no change in local or long-distance toll status. This made necessary the use of ten-digit dialing within the 330/234 area code region. After the introduction of area code 234, assignments of new telephone numbers in the area did not continue at an accelerated pace, and new phone numbers for area code 234 were not assigned until 2003.

== Economy ==
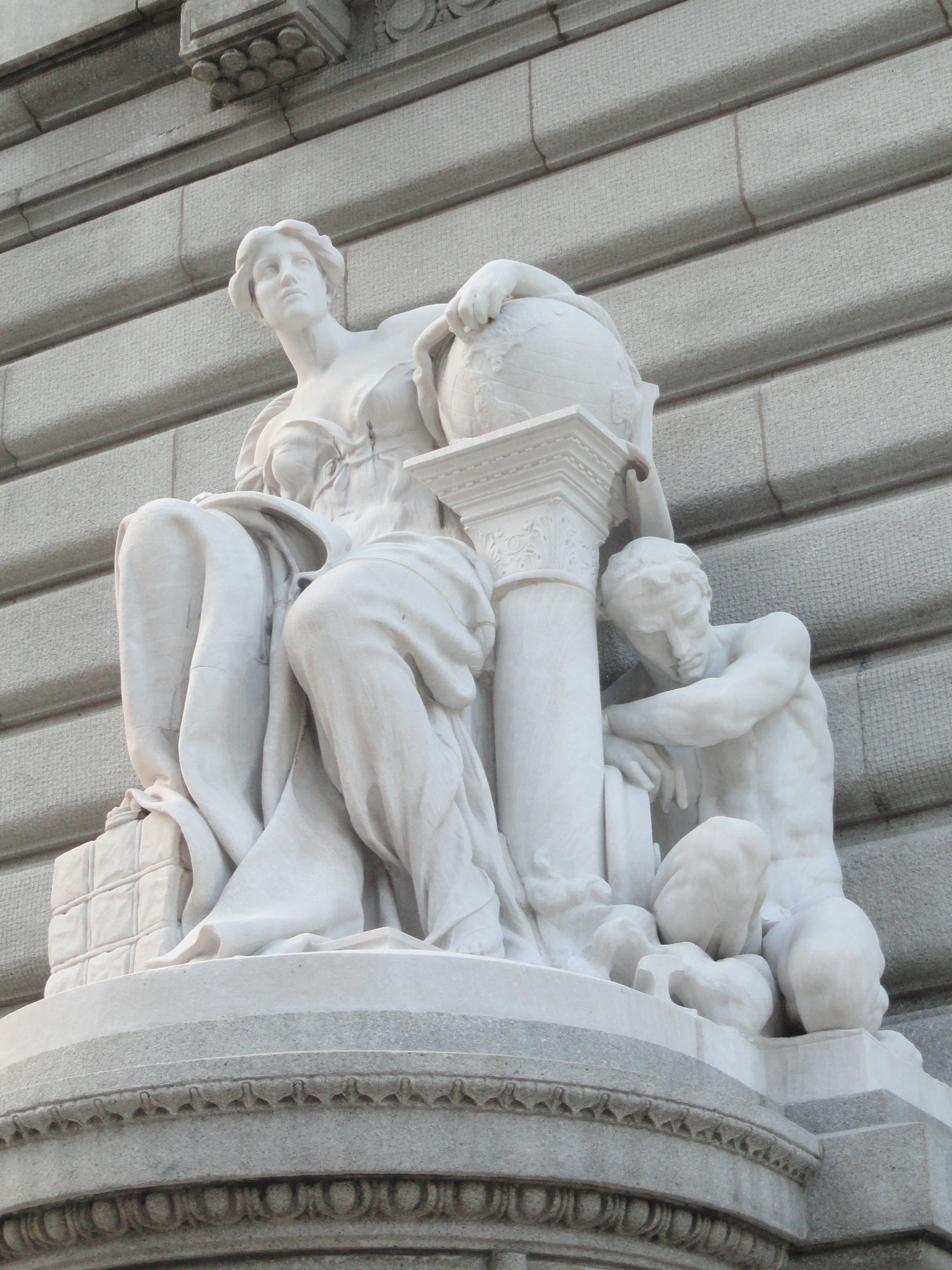
Commerce by Daniel Chester French at the Metzenbaum U.S. Courthouse on Superior Avenue, Cleveland

In 2011 the Greater Cleveland area had a GDP of $134.4 billion (up from $130.7 billion in 2008), which would rank 57th among countries. Cleveland also has the twelfth highest merchandise value, at $109.2 billion.

=== Business and industry ===
More than 37% of Fortune 500 companies are present in Northeast Ohio, through corporate headquarters, major divisions, subsidiaries, and sales offices. More than 150 international companies also have a presence there. As of 2006, Greater Cleveland serves as the corporate headquarters of 23 Fortune 1000 firms (shown with 2017 rankings below):

- (#86) Progressive Insurance (Mayfield Village, insurance)
- (#180) Sherwin-Williams (Cleveland, paint)
- (#224) Parker-Hannifin (Cleveland, industrial manufacturer)
- (#411) KeyCorp (Cleveland, banking)
- (#421 in 2023) Avery Dennison (Mentor, adhesives)
- (#467) Cliffs Natural Resources (Cleveland, iron ore mining)/AK Steel Holdings/Mittal
- (#480) Travel Centers of America (Westlake, specialty retail)
- (#508) RPM International (Medina, chemicals)
- (#513) TransDigm Group (Cleveland, aerospace and defense)
- (#724) PolyOne Corporation (Avon Lake, chemicals)
- (#762) Medical Mutual of Ohio (Cleveland, health insurance)
- (#782) Aleris International, Inc. (Cleveland, metals)
- (#783) Lincoln Electric (Cleveland, arc welding equipment)
- (#792) Hyster-Yale Materials Handling (Cleveland, industrial machinery)
- (#806) Applied Industrial Technologies (Cleveland, bearings)
- (#965) American Greetings (Cleveland, greeting cards)
- (#996) Nordson (Westlake, industrial machinery)

Other large employers include:

- Cleveland Clinic (Cleveland, health care)
- Eaton Corporation (North American HQ - Beachwood, electrical parts manufacturing)
- Ferro Corporation (Cleveland, advanced material manufacturing)
- Forest City Enterprises (Cleveland, real estate development)
- IMG (Cleveland, sports marketing and management)
- Invacare (Elyria, medical products and equipment)
- Jones Day (Cleveland, legal services)
- Lubrizol Corporation (Wickliffe, lubricants and chemicals)
- Mayfran International (Cleveland, conveyors)
- Nacco Industries (Cleveland, industrial equipment)
- Nestlé USA (Solon, food processing)
- Rockwell Automation (Mayfield Heights, industrial controls)
- SITE Centers (Beachwood, real estate development)
- Steris (Mentor, medical equipment)
- University Hospitals of Cleveland (Cleveland, health care)

=== Small businesses and startups ===
The Council of Smaller Enterprises coordinates and advocates for small businesses in the region. Many of the area's sustainability-oriented companies are tied into the network Entrepreneurs for Sustainability.

== Colleges and universities ==
Greater Cleveland is home to a number of higher education institutions, including:

- Baldwin Wallace University (Berea)
- Case Western Reserve University (Cleveland)
- Chamberlain School of Nursing (Cleveland)
- Cleveland Institute of Art (Cleveland)
- Cleveland Institute of Music (Cleveland)
- Cleveland State University (Cleveland)
- Cuyahoga Community College (Cleveland, Highland Hills, Parma and Brunswick)
- DeVry University (Seven Hills)
- John Carroll University (University Heights)
- Kent State University at Geauga (Burton)
- Kent State University College of Podiatric Medicine (Independence)
- Lake Erie College (Painesville)
- Lakeland Community College (Kirtland)
- Lorain County Community College (Elyria)
- Notre Dame College (South Euclid)
- Oberlin College (Oberlin)
- South University (Warrensville Heights, Ohio)
- Stautzenberger College (Brecksville)
- Ursuline College (Pepper Pike)

== Transportation ==
=== Airports ===
Greater Cleveland is served by international, regional and county airports, including:

- Burke Lakefront Airport (Cleveland)
- Cuyahoga County Airport
- Cleveland Hopkins International Airport (Cleveland)
- Lorain County Regional Airport (Russia Township)
- Willoughby Lost Nation Municipal Airport (Willoughby)

=== Highways ===

- Interstate 71
- Interstate 77
- Interstate 80 (Ohio Turnpike)
- Interstate 90
- Interstate 271
- Interstate 277
- Interstate 480
- Interstate 490
- U.S. Route 6
- U.S. Route 20
- U.S. Route 42
- U.S. Route 224
- U.S. Route 250
- U.S. Route 322
- U.S. Route 422
- Ohio State Route 2
- Ohio State Route 3
- Ohio State Route 8
- Ohio State Route 10
- Ohio State Route 11
- Ohio State Route 14
- Ohio State Route 17
- Ohio State Route 18
- Ohio State Route 21
- Ohio State Route 43
- Ohio State Route 44
- Ohio State Route 83
- Ohio State Route 88
- Ohio State Route 91
- Ohio State Route 113
- Ohio State Route 175
- Ohio State Route 176
- Ohio State Route 225
- Ohio State Route 254
- Ohio State Route 700

The Greater Cleveland highway network was intended to be more extensive than what was built.

=== Public transit ===
The Greater Cleveland Regional Transit Authority operates a bus system and heavy and light rail in Cuyahoga County. Other transit agencies serve the surrounding counties and provide connections with RTA, including Laketran in Lake County, and Lorain County Transit in Lorain County. Cleveland's RTA Red Line which started in 1955, is the eighth oldest heavy rail rapid transit in the Country. In 2007, RTA was named the best public transit system in North America by the American Public Transportation Association, for "demonstrating achievement in efficiency and effectiveness."

== Culture ==
=== Theater ===
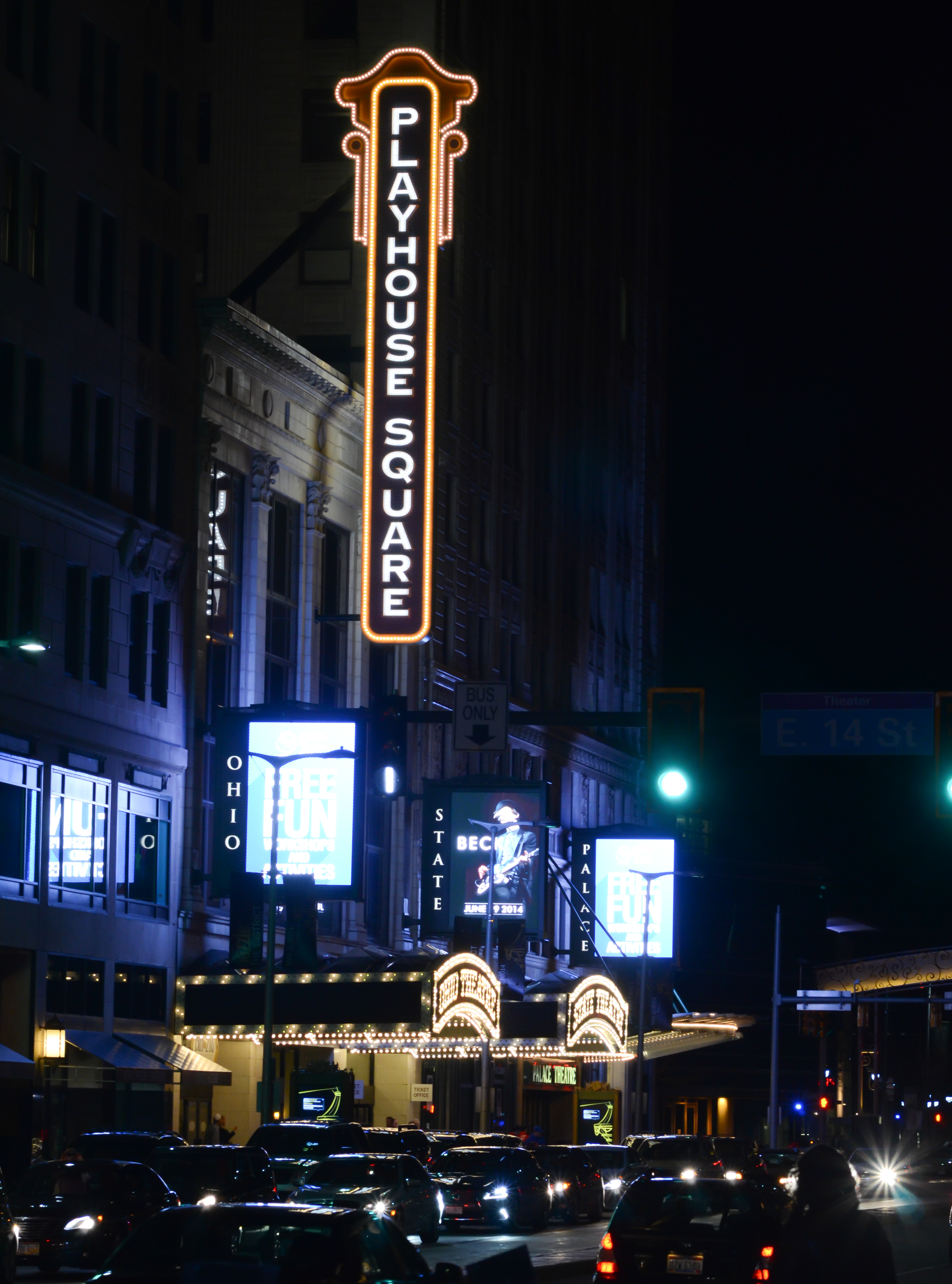
Playhouse Square, Cleveland

Playhouse Square Center is the epicenter of the Cleveland Theater District and the second largest theater district in the United States.

==== Playhouse Square Theaters ====
- Allen Theatre
- Hanna Theatre
- The Helen Rosenfeld Lewis Bialosky Lab Theatre
- Kennedy's Cabaret
- Ohio Theatre
- Palace Theatre
- Second Stage
- State Theatre
- Westfield Insurance Studio Theatre

Greater Cleveland has additional theaters throughout the region.

==== Theaters ====
- Beck Center (Lakewood)
- Cabaret Dada (Cleveland)
- Cassidy Theater (Parma Heights)
- Cleveland Play House (Cleveland)
- Cleveland Public Theater (Cleveland)
- Dobama Theater (Cleveland Heights)
- Euclid Avenue Opera House (destroyed)
- Geauga Theater (Chardon)
- Huntington Playhouse (Bay Village)
- Karamu House (Cleveland)
- Lorain Palace Theatre (Lorain)
- Near West Theatre (Cleveland)
- Olde Towne Hall Theatre (North Ridgeville)

==== Theatrical companies ====
- The Bang and Clatter Theatre Company
- Beck Center for the Arts
- Bodwin Theater Company
- Charenton Theatre Company
- Cleveland Shakespeare Festival
- Cleveland Signstage Theatre
- Convergence-Continuum
- Fairmount Center for the Arts (Mayfield Village Performing Arts Center)
- Fourth Wall Productions
- Great Lakes Theater
- The Group
- Portage Lakes Players
- The Public Squares
- Red Hen Productions

==== Music ====
Cleveland is home to the Cleveland Orchestra, widely considered one of the finest orchestras in the world, and often referred to as the finest in the United States. It is one of the "Big Five" major orchestras in the United States. The Orchestra plays at Severance Hall in University Circle during the winter and at Blossom Music Center in Cuyahoga Falls during the summer. The city is also home to the Cleveland Pops Orchestra.

==== Art ====
There are two main art museums in Cleveland. The Cleveland Museum of Art is a major American art museum, with a collection that includes more than 40,000 works of art ranging over 6,000 years, from ancient masterpieces to contemporary pieces. Museum of Contemporary Art Cleveland showcases established and emerging artists, particularly from the Cleveland area, through hosting and producing temporary exhibitions.

== Sports and recreation ==
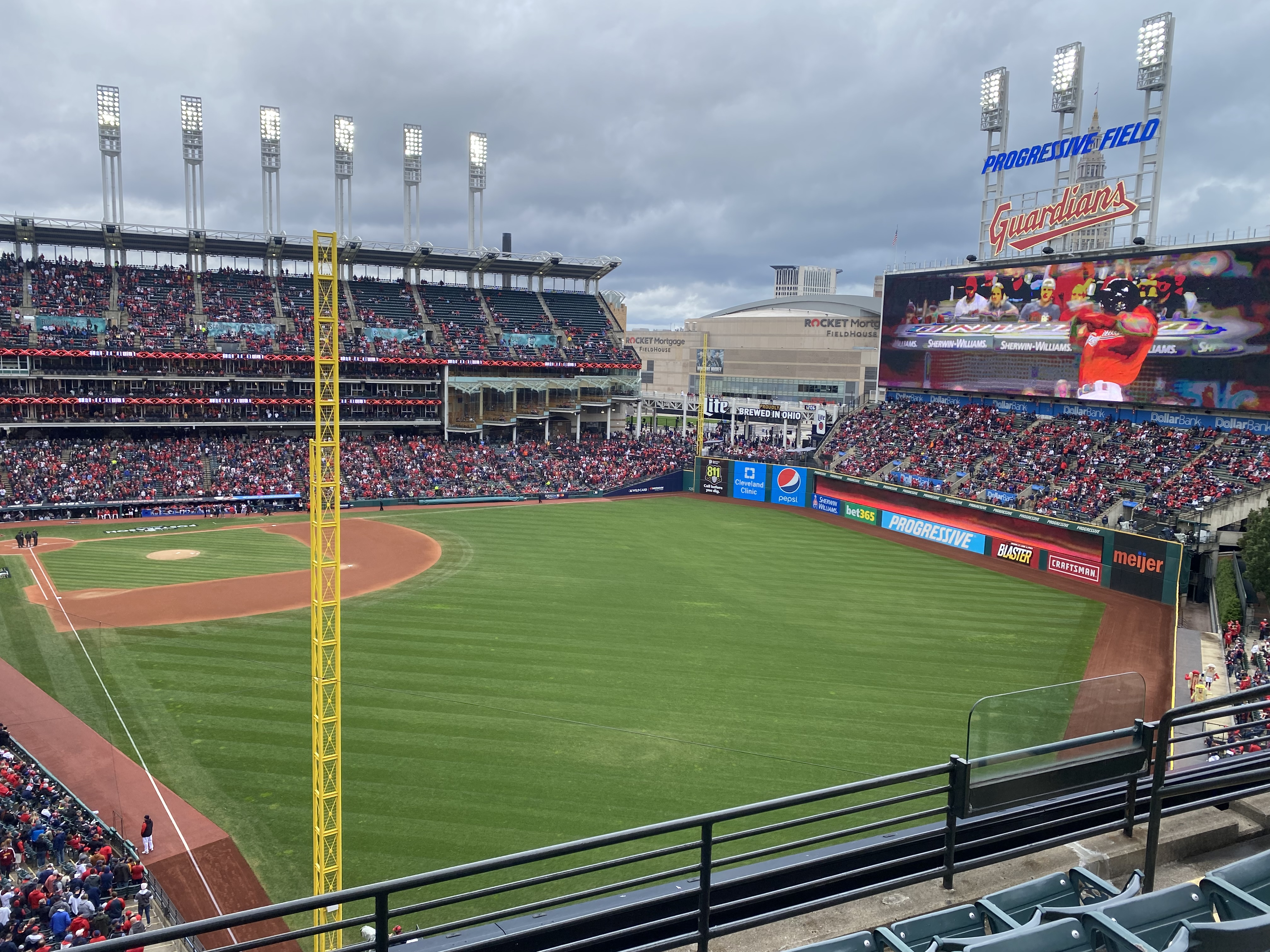
Progressive Field, home of the Cleveland Guardians

Cleveland's professional sports teams include the Cleveland Guardians (Major League Baseball), Cleveland Browns (National Football League), and Cleveland Cavaliers (National Basketball Association). The Lake County Captains, a Single-A minor league affiliate of the Cleveland Guardians, play in Eastlake at Classic Park. The Lake Erie Crushers of the Frontier League play at Sprenger Stadium in Avon.

Minor league hockey is represented in the area by the Cleveland Monsters of the American Hockey League. They began play in the 2007–08 AHL season at the Quicken Loans Arena. The team is the top minor league affiliate of the Columbus Blue Jackets of the National Hockey League.

The Cleveland Metroparks are a system of nature preserves that encircle the city, and the Cuyahoga Valley National Park encompasses the Cuyahoga River valley between Cleveland and Akron. The region is home to Mentor Headlands Beach, the longest natural beach on the Great Lakes.

== Notable natives ==
- Avant
- Albert Ayler
- Jim Backus
- Kaye Ballard
- LeCharles Bentley
- Halle Berry
- Chris Butler
- Drew Carey
- Mary Carey
- Eric Carmen
- Drew Carter
- Gerald Casale
- Ray Cash
- Chris Chambers
- Tracy Chapman
- Cheetah Chrome
- Tim Conway
- Wes Craven
- Kid Cudi
- Dorothy Dandridge
- Ruby Dee
- Donald DeFreeze
- Cheri Dennis
- Phil Donahue
- Stephen R. Donaldson
- Harlan Ellison
- Lee Evans
- James A. Garfield
- Sonny Geraci
- Ted Ginn Jr.
- Donald A. Glaser
- Bob Golic
- Mike Golic
- Anthony Gonzalez
- Jim Graner
- Joel Grey
- Arsenio Hall
- Roy Hall
- Margaret Hamilton
- Steve Harvey
- Screamin' Jay Hawkins
- Patricia Heaton
- Anne Heche
- Mike Hegan
- John W. Heisman
- Kim Herring
- Hal Holbrook
- Bob Hope
- Langston Hughes
- Chrissie Hynde
- LeBron James
- Philip Johnson
- Joe Jurevicius
- Sammy Kaye
- Machine Gun Kelly
- Don King
- Bobby Knight
- Heather Kozar
- Dennis Kucinich
- Dante Lavelli
- Mike Lebowitz
- Gerald Levert
- D. A. Levy
- Bob Lewis
- Peter B. Lewis
- Jim Lovell
- Henry Mancini
- O.J. McDuffie
- Burgess Meredith
- Howard Metzenbaum
- Urban Meyer
- Toni Morrison
- Bob Mothersbaugh
- Mark Mothersbaugh
- Paul Newman
- Chuck Noll
- Andre Norton
- Charles Oakley
- Jesse Owens
- Harvey Pekar
- John Popper
- Scott Raab
- Dave Ragone
- John D. Rockefeller
- Michael Ruhlman
- Molly Shannon
- Sam Sheppard
- Don Shula
- Jerry Siegel
- Ruth Simpson
- Robert Smith
- Troy Smith
- George Steinbrenner
- Carl B. Stokes
- Steve Stone
- Michael Symon
- David Thomas
- Jim Tressel
- George Voinovich
- David Wain
- Carl E. Walz
- Lew Wasserman
- Archibald Willard
- Debra Winger
- Fred Willard
- Frank Yankovic
- Roger Zelazny

== See also ==
- Great Lakes Megalopolis
- Great lakes region
- Rust Belt
- List of references to Cleveland in popular culture
- List of United States combined statistical areas
- List of United States metropolitan statistical areas by population
