= 5754 aluminium alloy =

Aluminium magnesium alloy

5754 aluminium–magnesium alloy is an alloy in the wrought aluminium -magnesium family (5000 or 5xxx series). It is closely related to the alloys 5154 and 5454 (Aluminum Association designations that only differ in the second digit are variations on the same alloy). Of the three 5x54 alloys, 5754 is the least alloyed (highest composition % of aluminium), but only by a small amount. It is used in similar applications. As a wrought alloy, it can be formed by rolling, extrusion, and forging, but not casting. It can be cold worked to produce tempers with a higher strength but a lower ductility.

Alternate names and designations include AlMg3, 3.3535, and A95754. The alloy and its various tempers are covered by the following standards:

- ASTM B 209: Standard Specification for Aluminium and Aluminium-Alloy Sheet and Plate
- EN 485-2: Aluminium and aluminium alloys. Sheet, strip and plate. Mechanical properties
- EN 573-3: Aluminium and aluminium alloys. Chemical composition and form of wrought products. Chemical composition and form of products
- EN 754-2: Aluminium and aluminium alloys. Cold drawn rod/bar and tube. Mechanical properties
- ISO 6361: Wrought Aluminium and Aluminium Alloy Sheets, Strips and Plates

== Chemical composition ==
The alloy composition of 5754 aluminium is:

Aluminium	Chromium	Copper	Iron	Magnesium	Manganese	Silicon	Titanium	Zinc	Residuals
94.2% to 97.4%	< 0.3%	< 0.1%	< 0.4%	2.6% to 3.6%	< 0.5%	< 0.4%	< 0.15%	< 0.2%	< 0.15%

== Properties ==
Typical material properties for 5754 aluminium alloy include:

- Density: 2.67 g/cm^{3}, or 167 lb/ft^{3}.
- Young's modulus: 69 GPa, or 10 Msi.
- Ultimate tensile strength: 220 to 330 MPa, or 32 to 48 ksi.
- Thermal Conductivity: 130 W/m-K.
- Thermal Expansion: 23.7 μm/m-K.
