= Renusagar =

- town
- Location in Uttar Pradesh, India
- Coordinates: 24.18°N 82.79°E
- Country: India
- State: Uttar Pradesh
- District: Sonebhadra

Area
  - Total: 5 km^{2} (1.9 sq mi)
- Elevation: 450 m (1,480 ft)

Languages
  - Official: Hindi
- Time zone: UTC+5:30 (IST)
- PIN: 231218
- Telephone code: 05446
- Vehicle registration: UP 64
- Nearest city: Anpara
- Sex ratio: 95/100 ♂/♀
- Literacy: 99%%
- Lok Sabha constituency: Duddhi
- Vidhan Sabha constituency: parasi
- Climate: normal (Köppen)

Renusagar is a town situated in the south of Sonbhadra, Uttar Pradesh, India. Renusagar is the home of Renusagar Power Plant, a 700 MW captive power plant which supplies electricity to Hindalco Industries' operations in Renukoot. The rest of the town is mostly a middle class residential community, managed by the Civic Authority of Hindalco.

== Education ==
Aditya Birla Junior School, previously known as Renupower Prathmik Pathshala, is Renusagar's Hindi-medium school for grades 1–5. Aditya Birla Intermediate College, formerly known as Renupower Intermediate College, educates grades 6–12, in Hindi. The Aditya Birla Public School, formerly known as Vidya Mandir is affiliated to CBSE Board for LKG to 12, was inaugurated by Shri Aditya Vikram Birla.

Sonebhadra district has good connectivity to nearby major cities. The nearest city to Renusagar is Mirzapur 200 km by a four lane road of great condition, nearest railway station is Anpara, it is 779 km from Bhopal. The nearest airport is at Varanasi and one at Mayurpur owned by Hindalco. Private transport facilities are also available in this area and it is directly connected with Chattishgarh (Ambikapur), Maharashtra (Nagpur) and Uttar Pradesh (Varanasi) by road. Renusagar is approximately 35 km from Renukoot which has train connectivity with Jammu Tawi, Amritsar, Delhi, Ranchi, Jamshedpur, Rourkela and Kolkata.
