= The Group (theater) =

American theatrical company

The Group (also known as The Group in Lakewood) is a Greater Cleveland theatrical company formed in 1964. Its current home for performances is the Beck Center for the Arts in Lakewood, Ohio. It is the second oldest theater company in Greater Cleveland, after the Great Lakes Theater Festival. The non-profit group produced an annual fundraiser production for local charities. The group was composed of volunteer actors and for six seasons, their own house magician.

== Original productions ==
- 1964 - Untitled
- 1965 - "Tunes 'n' Times"
- 1966 - "Anything Can Happen"
- 1967 - "The Spring Thing"
- 1968 - "A Start from Scratch"
- 1969 - Untitled
- 1970 - "Three Acts to Grind"
- 1971 - "Three for All"
- 1972 - Untitled
- 1973 - "A Gypsy Takes a Bride"
- 1974 - "On Your Way Violet"
- 1975 - "Group Therapy"
- 1976 - "Revoltin' Developments"
- 1977 - "Double Play"
- 1978 - "It's About Time"
- 1979 - "Act Your Age"
- 1980 - "Wholly Moses or Up a Crooked River"
- 1981 - "Between the Covers"
- 1982 - "Triple Threat"
- 1983 - "Write On"
- 1984 - "Black and White and Read All Over"
- 1985 - "A Trivial Salute"
- 1986 - "Curtain Going Up?"
- 1987 - "In One Era, Out the Other"
- 1988 - "A Little Travelin' Music"
- 1989 - "Celebration"
- 1990 - "Something"
- 1991 - "Swell Hotel"
- 1992 - "Group Encounters"
- 1993 - "Long Ago and Far Away"
- 1994 - "A Murder Runs Through It"
- 1995 - "When in Rome It's Greek to Me"
- 1996 - "Ghost of a Chance"
- 1997 - "Never the Twain"
- 1998 - "It's Too, Too Divine"
- 1999 - "Dis-Oriented Express"
- 2000 - "Century (All The Good Titles Were Taken)"
- 2001 - "The Group Goes To The Movies"
- 2002 - "A Class Act"
- 2003 - "This Just In"
- 2004 - "Our Show of Shows"
- 2005 - "Games People Play"
- 2006 - "Colonel Beauregard Tuna's Phantastical Grab Bag-o-Comedy"
- 2007 - "A Pirate's Life For Me"
