= Aleris =

American companies

Aleris Corporation

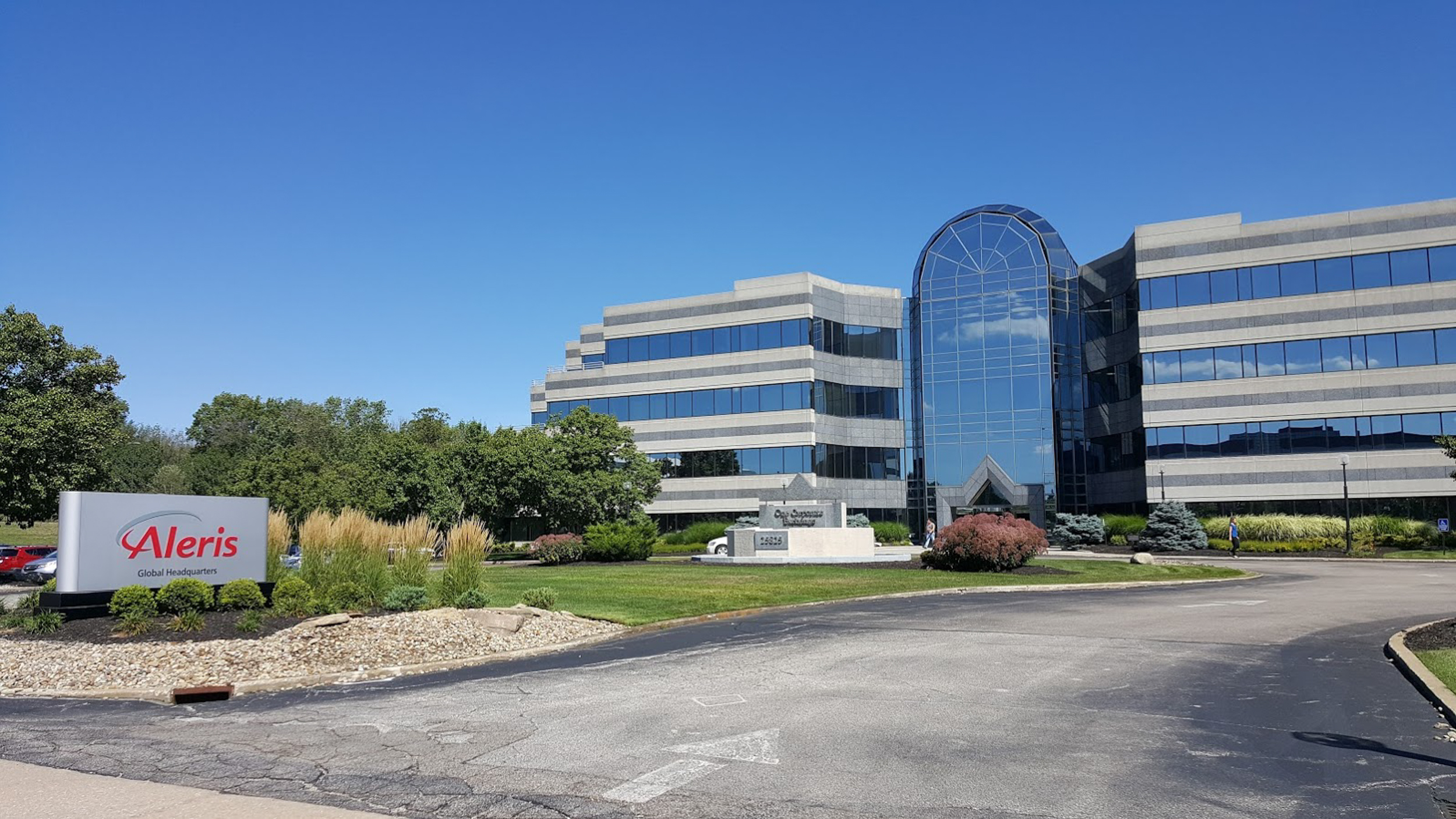
- The company's headquarters in Beachwood, Ohio, in 2016
- Company type: Subsidiary
- Industry: Manufacturing
- Founded: 2004; 22 years ago
- Defunct: 2020
- Fate: Acquired by Novelis
- Successor: Novelis
- Headquarters: Beachwood, Ohio, United States
- Area served: Worldwide
- Key people: Sean Stack (CEO)
- Products: Aluminum
- Number of employees: 5,000 (2015)
- Parent: Novelis
- Website: aleris.com at the Wayback Machine (archived 2019-10-08)

Aleris Corporation (also Aleris Inc. or Aleris International Inc.) was an American aluminum rolled products producer, based in Beachwood, Ohio. The company had approximately 5,000 employees globally as of mid 2015.

On 15 April 2020, Aleris Corporation was acquired by Hindalco Industries subsidiary Novelis Inc. for $2.8 billion. With the deal closure, Hindalco is now one of the world's largest aluminium makers and Novelis' entered into the high-end aerospace segment.

== Corporate affairs ==
Aleris was an aluminum rolled products producer, based in Beachwood, Ohio, a suburb of Cleveland. The privately held company had approximately 5,000 employees overall, as of mid 2015, around 200 of which are based in Northeast Ohio, including a manufacturing facility in Uhrichsville, Ohio. Aleris has private equity owners, including Apollo Global and Oaktree Capital Management.

Steve Demetriou served as the first chairman and chief executive officer (CEO). Sean Stack became CEO and joined the board of directors in mid 2015. Scott Graves became a non-executive chairman of Aleris' board at the same time.

== History ==
Aleris was established in 2004, the result of a merger between an aluminum recycling company and an aluminum rolled products company. Aleris operated as a portfolio company of Texas Pacific Group, and expanded via acquisitions during its early history. The company acquired Corus Group's aluminum extrusion and rolling businesses for approximately $894 million (€700 million) in 2006, and Wabash Alloys for an undisclosed amount in 2007. Following the Corus acquisition, Aleris had approximately 8,800 employees and more than 40 manufacturing facilities globally.

In February 2009, the Department of Justice filed suit against the company, alleging that 15 of its plants had violated the Clean Air Act by emission of pollutants. Aleris settled the suit with the government in August 2009, and agreed to pay a $4.6 million fine and spend an additional $4.2 million on new pollution controls at its plants. The 2008 financial crisis and the Great Recession caused significant downturns in production, and Aleris experienced a 40 percent volume decline during 2008–2009.

In 2009, the company filed for Chapter 11 bankruptcy, and Apollo, Oaktree Capital, and Sankaty Advisors became owners in 2010. Aleris stabilized its financial position and significantly reduced debt. The company also invested in its facilities, building a new aerospace plate mill in China during the early 2010s, finishing a $70 million expansion of its facility in Duffel Belgium (2013), and improving its plant in Ashville, Ohio, in 2014. Aleris acquired Nichols Aluminum and its production facilities in Davenport, Iowa, Decatur, Alabama, and Lincolnshire, Illinois, for $110 million cash in 2014. The aluminum finishing plant in Decatur was closed before the end of the year to streamline operations. Aleris had more than 40 production facilities in North America, Europe, and Asia, as of October 2014.

In 2015, the company focused on selling its extrusion and recycling businesses, and planned to raise approximately $600 million in capital. The divestitures decreased the number of employees to around 5,000. Aleris abandoned plans to complete an initial public offering in 2015. The company had approximately 7,000 employees in the U.S., Europe, and China at the time, including approximately 340 in Uhrichsville and 250 in Greater Cleveland. Aleris was also among the largest aluminum sheet suppliers for semi-trailers, and the leading aluminum sheet supplier for the U.S. residential construction industry. The company increased production as the automotive industry began using more aluminum than steel. Aleris' new aluminum body sheet facility in Lewisport, Kentucky opened in 2017.

China Zhongwang subsidiary Zhongwang USA and Aleris entered into a merger agreement in August 2016, marking the highest offer made by a Chinese firm for an American metal producing company. However, the $2.3 billion ($1.1 billion in cash plus $1.2 billion in debt) agreement was abandoned in November 2017 because of uncertainties around regulations and approval by the Committee on Foreign Investment in the United States. Hindalco Industries was working on a $2.5 billion bid to acquire Aleris, as of October 2017, and Vedanta Resources was considering a bid, as of January 2018.

In 2017 and 2018, Aleris entered into multi-year agreements to supply aluminum to Bombardier Inc. and Boeing, respectively. Aleris is ranked number 690 on the 2019 Fortune 1000.

In March 2019, Aleris was recognized with the accredited supplier award for outstanding quality performance by Airbus for the second consecutive year.

On 15 April 2020, Aleris Corporation was acquired by Hindalco Industries subsidiary Novelis Inc. for $2.8 billion. With the deal closure, Hindalco is now one of the world's largest aluminium makers and Novelis' entered into the high-end aerospace segment.

== Metals ==
Aleris manufactures a number of different alloys, such as AA7022-T651, a member of the 7000 series of alloys, which contains in addition to aluminum, silicon, iron, copper, manganese, magnesium, chromium, zinc, titanium and zirconium. In its Koblenz facility, which used to be called Corus Aluminium Walzprodukte GmbH, it produces alloy AA5059-H131, and for the structural components of aircraft, aluminium-magnesium-lithium alloys in the range 1.3-6.3 mm thick.
