= Hirakud Captive Power Plant =

Coordinates: 21.529762°N 83.908647°E

Hirakud Power Plant is a coal based captive thermal power plant located near Hirakud in Sambalpur district in the Indian state of Odisha. The power plant began commercial production in April 2013, is operated by the Hindalco Industries, the metals flagship company of the Aditya Birla Group. The plant supplies power to Hindalco's Hirakud smelter.

== Capacity ==
It has an installed capacity of 467.5 MW. The plant is functional.
