= 5052 =

5052 may refer to:

- The year in the 6th millennium
- 5052 Nancyruth, asteroid
- 5052 aluminium alloy
