= Aditya Captive Power Plant =

Coal power plant in Odisha, India

- Official name: Aditya Power
- Country: India
- Location: India Odisha
- Coordinates: 21.7235°N 84.0153°E
- Status: Running
- Construction began: 2010
- Commission date: 2013
- Construction cost: ₹4,015 Crores (USD $585 million)
- Owner: Hindalco Industries

Thermal power station
- Primary fuel: Coal

Power generation
- Nameplate capacity: 900 MW

External links
- Website: www.hindalco.com

Aditya Captive Power Plant is a captive 900 megawatt power project located at Lapanga, Sambalpur District, Odisha, which is part of Hindalco's Smelter_power project in Odisha. It has captive coal from Talabira-2 coal block a JV between Mahanadi Coalfields and Neyveli Lignite Corporation.

== Project ==
Hindalco Industries awarded contract to BHEL for main package in June 2009. It is 6x150MW project with first of its kind Turbo generators designed by BHEL specifically for this project.

== Clearances ==
The project has been accorded environmental clearance by the Ministry of Environment, Forest and Climate Change (MoEF&CC).

== Capacity ==
The planned capacity of the thermal power plant is 1350 MW. Phase I of 6x150MW units and Phase II of 5x150 MW units.

Stage	Unit Number	Installed Capacity (MW)	Date of Commissioning	Status
Phase I	Unit 1	150MW	2013	Running
Phase I	Unit 2	150MW	2013	Running
Phase I	Unit 3	150MW	2013	Running
Phase I	Unit 4	150MW	2013	Running
Phase I	Unit 5	150MW	2013	Running
Phase I	Unit 6	150MW	2013	Running
Phase II	Unit 5x150	150MW	-	Proposed
