= Novelis =

American industrial aluminum smelting company

Novelis Inc.
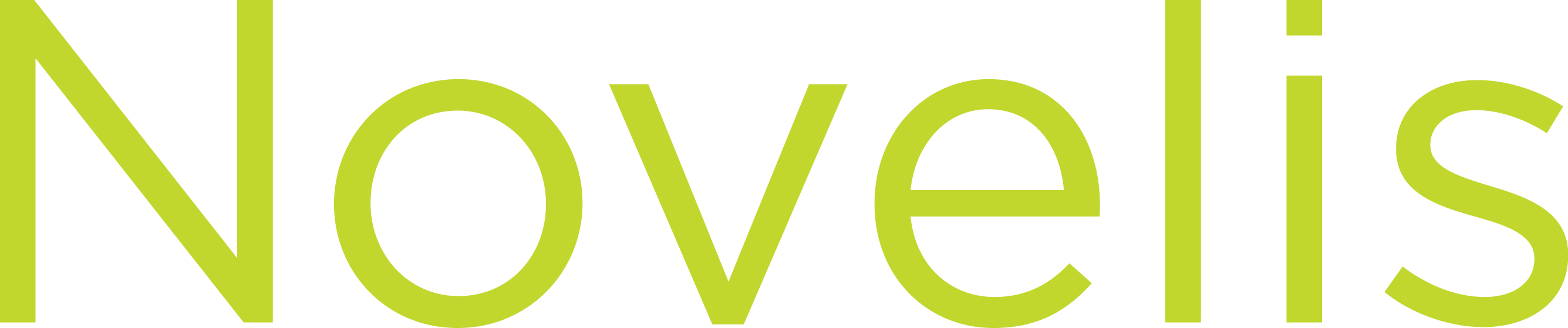
- Type: Subsidiary
- Industry: Metals, Manufacturing, Recycling
- Founded: 2005
- Headquarters: Atlanta, GA, USA
- Area served: Worldwide
- Key people: Steven Fisher, President and CEO
- Products: Aluminium
- Revenue: ▲US$17.1 billion (2025)
- Net income: ▲US$683 million (2025)
- Total assets: ▲US$16.51 billion (2025)
- Total equity: ▲US$4.51 billion (2025)
- Number of employees: 13,250 (2025)
- Parent: Hindalco Industries
- Website: www.novelis.com

Novelis Inc. is an American industrial aluminum smelting company, headquartered in Atlanta, Georgia, United States. It produces rolled aluminum and is an aluminum recycler, supplying to sectors including beverage cans, automotive, aerospace, consumer electronics, construction, foil and packaging.

Novelis has been an independent subsidiary of Indian multinational aluminum and copper manufacturing company Hindalco Industries since 2007.

== Company history ==
The company was incorporated in 2004 after being spun off from Alcan, a Canadian mining and aluminum manufacturer now Rio Tinto Alcan. In 2007 the company was acquired by Hindalco Industries for $6 billion, itself a subsidiary of the Aditya Birla Group.

In May 2024, Novelis filed its registration statement for a proposed IPO, but it withdrew its plans in October of the same year. In March 2025, Novelis announced closure of its operation in Fairmont, West Virginia, at a 100-year old production plant.

== Operations ==
Novelis is the world's largest producer of rolled aluminum sheet with operations in 11 countries. The company divides its operations into four regions: North America, Europe, Asia, and South America. The regional headquarters are Atlanta, Zurich, Seoul and São Paulo. Novelis also has operations in the United Kingdom, Germany, Italy, France, Canada, China, Malaysia and Vietnam.

The company invested $100 million in its first manufacturing facility in China, which opened in 2014. In response to global demand for aluminum sheet for automotive, electronics and beverage cans, the company has announced capital investments including a $400 million expansion in Asia, a $300 million expansion in Brazil and $200 million expansion in North America. In July 2014, it announced that Reynolds Consumer Products Inc., a subsidiary of the Rank Group of New Zealand, purchased the North American consumer products division of Novelis, for CAD $33.75mn.

Novelis recycles more than 70 billion used beverage cans each year.

In May 2022, Novelis announced plans to invest $2.5 billion in a new, low-carbon, aluminum plant in Bay Minette, Alabama. Once complete, it will be the first fully integrated aluminum mill built for 40 years.

On September 16th, 2025 the Oswego, NY facility suffered a fire in the "hot mill" section. The three-alarm fire brought down part of the factory’s roof, requiring 26 area fire departments to extinguish, according to the Oswego County fire coordinators office.

== Production ==
=== Packaging ===
- Foil packaging
- Closures
- Beverage Cans - Novelis produces sheet aluminum that it sells to the following companies to be made into cans
  - Anheuser-Busch
  - Ball Corporation
  - Coca-Cola
  - GZ Industries Ltd Nigeria
  - Rexam

=== Automotive and transportation ===
Aluminum structures and components for transportation products in automotive, automotive heat exchanger and mass transportation. Auto sheet customers include:

- Audi
- BMW
- Ferrari
- Ford
- GM
- Hyundai
- Jaguar
- Mercedes-Benz
- Porsche
- Range Rover
- Volvo

=== Specialty ===
- Architecture and building
  - Facade
  - Roofing
  - Insulation
  - Shutters
- Lithography and printing
- Consumer goods
  - Smartphones, laptops, TV
- Industrial applications

== Acquisitions ==
On 15 April 2020, Novelis acquired Aleris Corporation for $2.8 billion. Through this acquisition Novelis entered into the high-end aerospace segment.

== Awards and accomplishments ==
- 2013, Novelis was named metals company of the year, and Novelis CEO Phil Martens was named CEO of the year on the Platts Global Metals Awards in London
- 2012, Novelis CEO Phil Martens was named one of the top 25 CEOs in the world by Best Practice Institute
- 2012 Aluminium Awards for Innovation Leadership
- 2012 American Metal Market Award for Aluminum Excellence in Environmental Responsibility in 2012:
- 2012 Georgia Governor's International Award for establishing its Global Research & Technology Center in Kennesaw, GA.
- 2011 Innovation Award from BMW
- 2009 Vision Award from Keep America Beautiful
