= 5059 aluminium alloy =

Aluminium magnesium alloy

5059 aluminium alloy is an aluminium–magnesium alloy, primarily alloyed with magnesium. It is not strengthened by heat treatment, instead becoming stronger due to strain hardening, or cold mechanical working of the material.

Since heat treatment doesn't strongly affect the strength, 5059 can be readily welded and retain most of its mechanical strength.

5059 alloy was derived from closely related 5083 aluminium alloy by researchers at Corus Aluminium in 1999.

== Basic properties ==
5059 has a density of 2,660 kg/m^{3} (0.096 lb/cu in), with a specific gravity of 2.66.

Melting point is 590 °C (1,090 °F).

== Chemical properties ==
The alloy composition of 5059 is:

- Magnesium - 5%-6% by weight
- Chromium - 0.3% maximum
- Copper - 0.4% maximum
- Iron - 0.5% maximum
- Manganese - 0.6% - 1.2%
- Silicon - 0.45% maximum
- Titanium - 4.6%
- Zinc - 0.4% - 1.5%
- Zirconium - 0.05%-0.25%
- Others each 0.05% maximum
- Others total 0.15% maximum
- Remainder Aluminium

== Mechanical properties ==
The mechanical properties of 5059 vary significantly with hardening and temperature.

=== –O hardening ===
Unhardened 5059 has a yield strength of 160 MPa (23 ksi) and ultimate tensile strength of 330 MPa (48 ksi) from −28 to 100 °C (−18 to 212 °F). At cryogenic temperatures it is slightly stronger; above 100 °C (212 °F) its strength is reduced.

Elongation, the strain before material failure, is 24% at room temperature.

=== –H131 hardening ===
yield strength of 39.0 ksi (269 MPa), ultimate tensile strength of 52.9 ksi (365 MPa). Produced by Aleris under the AluStar brand.

=== –H136 hardening ===
yield strength of 39.0 ksi (269 MPa), ultimate tensile strength of 52.1 ksi (359 MPa). Produced by Aleris under the AluStar brand.

=== –H321 hardening ===
H321 strain hardened 5059, with properties measured at 20 °C (68 °F), has yield strength of 270 MPa (39 ksi), ultimate tensile strength of 370 MPa (54 ksi), and elongation of 10%.

== Uses ==
5059 has been used as a hull material for small aluminium boats or larger yachts. Its high strength and good corrosion resistance make it an excellent match for yachting.

5059 has been tested for use in vehicle armor.

5059 has been used for cryogenic propellant tanks for experimental reusable rocket vehicles.

=== Welding ===
5059 is often assembled using arc welding, typically MIG (for marine use) or TIG welding. The newer technique of Friction stir welding has also been successfully applied but is not in common use.

Arc welding reduces mechanical properties to no worse than –O hardening condition. The relatively low decrease in ultimate strength is extremely good performance for an aluminium alloy.
