= Hindalco Industries =

Indian multinational aluminium manufacturing company pvt ltd

Hindalco Industries Limited
- Type: Public
- Traded as: BSE: 500440; NSE: HINDALCO; NSE NIFTY 50 Constituent
- ISIN: INE038A01020
- Industry: Metals
- Founded: 1958; 68 years ago
- Headquarters: Mumbai, Maharashtra India
- Area served: Worldwide
- Key people: Kumar Mangalam Birla (Chairman); Satish Pai (Managing Director)
- Products: Aluminium and copper products
- Revenue: ▲₹274,944 crore (US$29 billion) (2026)
- Operating income: ▲₹38,097 crore (US$4.1 billion) (2026)
- Net income: ▲₹13,391 crore (US$1.4 billion) (2026)
- Total assets: ▲₹233,710 crore (US$25 billion) (2026)
- Total equity: ▲₹108,540 crore (US$12 billion) (2026)
- Number of employees: 36,120 (2026)
- Parent: Aditya Birla Group
- Subsidiaries: Novelis; Aleris
- Website: www.hindalco.com

Hindalco Industries Limited an Indian aluminium and copper manufacturing company, is a subsidiary of the Aditya Birla Group. Its headquarters are at Mumbai, Maharashtra, India.

The company is listed in the Forbes Global 2000 (2023) at 661st rank. Its market capitalisation by the end of November 2023 was US$15.6 billion.

== History ==
The Hindustan Aluminium Corporation Limited was established in 1958 by the Aditya Birla Group. In 1962 the company began production in Renukoot in Uttar Pradesh making 20 thousand metric tons per year of aluminium and 40 thousand metric tons per year of alumina. In 1989 the company was restructured and renamed Hindalco. Ramdev Singh was the first trade union leader of Hindalco Industries Limited, Renukoot.

On 20 February 2026, Hindalco Industries signed an MoU with Brazilian aerospace major Embraer, to explore and assess potential sources for aerospace-grade aluminium manufacturing in India.

== Operations ==
=== Power plants ===
- Renusagar Power Plant. An 826.57 MW (10 generating units of various capacities) captive power plant which is about 40 km from Renukoot, Sonebhadra district, Uttar Pradesh.
- Hirakud Captive Power Plant. A 467.5 MW captive power plant located at Hirakud, Sambalpur District, Odisha. This plant supplies power to Hirakud smelter of Hindalco Industries.
- Utkal Alumina Captive Power Plant. A 90 MW captive power plant located at Doraguda, Rayagada District, Odisha. This plant supplies power to Utkal Refinery of Hindalco Industries.
- Aditya Captive Power Plant. A 900 MW captive power plant located at Lapanga, Sambalpur District, Odisha. This plant supplies power to Aditya smelter of Hindalco Industries.
- Mahan Hindalco Industries Ltd. a 900 MW captive power plant and alumina smelter located in Bargawa 20 km from Singrauli.

== Novelis ==
On 11 February 2007, the company entered into an agreement to acquire the American company Novelis for US$6 billion, making the combined entity the world's largest rolled-aluminium producer. At 2007 Novelis was the world's largest producer of rolled aluminium and a major recycler of aluminium cans. On 15 May 2007, the acquisition was completed with Novelis shareholders receiving $44.93 per outstanding share of common stock.

Novelis operates as an independent subsidiary with its own leadership team and remains headquartered in Atlanta, Georgia. It is incorporated in Delaware.

Hindalco, through its wholly owned subsidiary AV Metals Inc., acquired 75,415,536 common shares of Novelis, representing 100 per cent of the issued and outstanding common shares. Immediately after closing, AV Metals Inc. transferred the common shares of Novelis to its wholly owned subsidiary AV Aluminum Inc. When Hindalco made this bid in 2007 this became the largest Indian investment in North America and the second-largest overseas investment by an Indian company (behind Tata Steel Europe's purchase of Corus two weeks earlier) to this time.

The day after Hindalco announced the acquisition its stock fell by 13% resulting in a US$600 million drop in market capitalisation. Shareholders criticised the deal but Kumar Mangalam Birla responded that he had offered a fair price for the company and stated, "When you are acquiring a world leader you will have to pay a premium."

== Other acquisitions ==
In June 2000, acquisition of controlling stake in Indian Aluminium Company Limited (Indal) with 74.6 per cent equity holding.

In July 2007, Hindalco announced it is acquiring the stake of Alcan Inc. in the Utkal Alumina Project located in Doraguda, Odisha.

On 15 April 2020, Novelis acquired US-based Aluminium rolled products manufacturer Aleris Corporation. Hindalco's Novelis' entry into the high-end aerospace segment, this deal has been closed at an enterprise value of $2.8 billion.

On 6 February 2024, Hindalco announced it is acquiring 26% stake in Ayana Renewable Power Four (ARPFPL) for a value of Rs 1.62 crore. Hindalco will operate a captive power generation plant for supplying 100 MW Renewable energy to Hindalcos smelter in Odisha.

== Listings and shareholding ==
The equity shares of Hindalco are listed on the Bombay Stock Exchange, where it is a constituent of the BSE SENSEX index, and the National Stock Exchange of India, where it is a constituent of the S&P CNX Nifty. Its Global depository receipts are listed on the Luxembourg Stock Exchange.

As on 31 March 2022, the promoters Aditya Birla Group held around 34.64% equity shares in Hindalco. Over 408,000 individual shareholders hold approx. 9% of its shares.

== See also ==
- Grasim Industries
- Hindustan Copper
