= Aluminium–magnesium alloys =

Aluminium alloys containing magnesium

Aluminium–magnesium alloys (AlMg) are aluminium alloys that are mainly made of aluminium and contain magnesium as the main alloy element. Most standardised alloys also contain small additives of manganese (AlMg(Mn)). Pure AlMg alloys and the AlMg(Mn) alloys belong to the medium-strength, natural (not hardened by heat treatment) alloys. Other AlMg alloys are aluminium–magnesium–copper alloys (AlMgCu) and aluminium–magnesium–silicon alloys (AlMgSi, 6000 series).

== Applications and processing ==
Discovery of aluminium–magnesium alloys dates back to late 19th century. AlMg alloys are among the most important aluminium alloys for construction materials. They get cold dwell transform, i.e., by rolling and forging and are easily weldable at Mg levels of at least 3%. AlMg is rarely processed through extrusion presses, as subsequent strength changes in extrusion profiles must be avoided. The majority of AlMg alloys are processed into rolled products as well as pipes, rods, wires and free-form or drop-forged parts. Parts are also processed into extrusion profiles with simple cross-sections.

Due to the good corrosion resistance and high strength at low temperatures, AlMg is used in shipbuilding, in the construction of chemical apparatus and pipelines, and for refrigeration technology and automobiles. The good weldability is crucial for use in the aircraft construction, there also with additions of scandium and zirconium for better weldability.

== Solubility of magnesium and phases ==
The solubility of magnesium is very high in aluminium and reaches a maximum at 450 °C with 14% to 17% depending on the literature reference. At 34.5%, there is a Eutectic with Al_{8}Mg_{5} (sometimes referred to as Al_{3}Mg_{2}), an intermetallic phase ($\beta$-phase). The solubility of Mg decreases sharply with falling temperature, i.e., at 100 °C it is still 2%, at room temperature 0.2%.

The elimination of the $\beta$-phase occurs with pure AlMg alloys after a four-stage process. With technically used alloys with other alloying elements and impurities, the process is much more complicated:

- First of all, clusters form, in the case of aluminium as GP zones. These are local accumulations of magnesium atoms in the aluminium grid, which do not yet form their own phase and do not have a regular arrangement.
- Formation of the coherent $\beta''$-phase. Their crystals have the same spatial orientation as those of the aluminium mixing crystal.
- Formation of the semi-coherent $\beta'$-phase. It is only partially oriented towards the lattice of the Al mixed crystal.
- Formation of incoherent $\beta$-phase. It has no spatial orientation with the Al mixed crystal.

In the case of technical alloys, the excretion differs from this for the following reasons:

- Low diffusion of magnesium in aluminium
- For the formation of GP zones and $\beta''$-phase, a high oversaturation of 7% Mg and more is required, which is not achieved in most all>oys. In AlMg_{4.5}Mn_{0.7}, no GP zones were used even after prolonged glow at temperatures up to 250 °C or $\beta''$-phase found, although after just a few days $\beta$-phase is present.
- Dislocations are not sufficient terms for the formation of $\beta''$-phase, $\beta'$-phase or $\beta$-phase. The reason is the small volume difference between these phases and the matrix.

== Structures ==
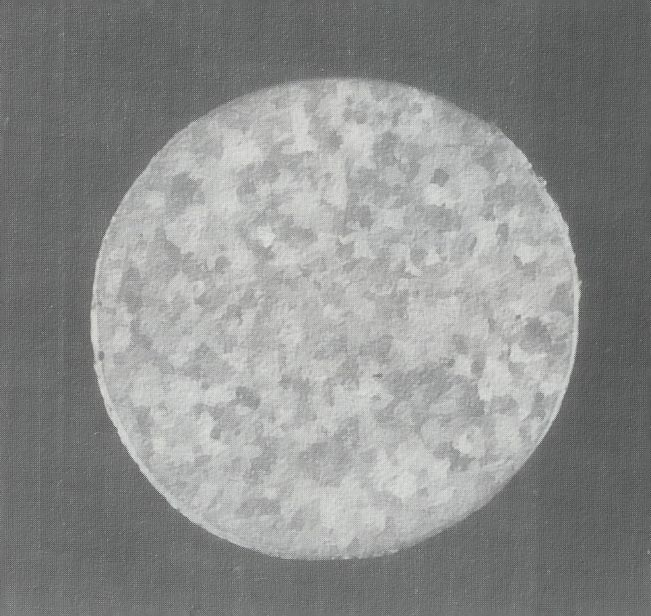
round test specimen made of AlMg_{3}, without grain fineness (2×)

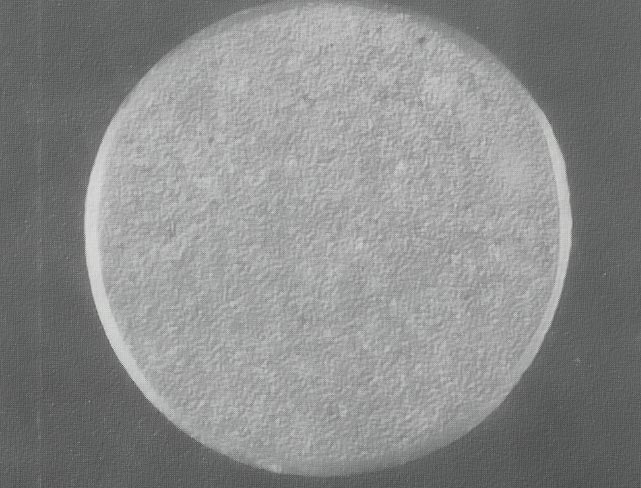
round test specimen made of AlMg_{3}, grain-fight

The diffusion of magnesium in aluminium is very low. The reason is the high size difference between the radius of the aluminium atoms and that of the magnesium atoms ($r_{Al}:r_{Mg} = 1.43:1.6$). Therefore, after watering, only part of the magnesium is removed from the mixed crystal, while most of it is present as an oversaturated solution in aluminium. Even with prolonged annealing treatment, this condition cannot be eliminated.

Excess magnesium is excreted mainly at the grain boundaries as well as on dispersion particles in the grain. The speed of the process depends on the Mg content and the temperature and increases with both. At the grain boundaries, so-called plaques are initially excreted, thin plates that are not connected, i.e. do not yet form a continuous layer around the grain. At 70 °C, they form after 3 months, at 100 °C after 3 days and at 150 °C after one to nine hours. If further time passes at elevated temperature, the plaques grow together to form a contiguous film. This has a negative effect on corrosion resistance, but can be dissolved by heat treatment. Annealing at 420 °C for one hour followed by slow cooling of 20 °C/h or starting annealing at 200 °C to 240 °C is suitable. The plaques of the $\beta$-phase transform into numerous small particles, referred to in the specialist literature as "bead line-like". They no longer form a coherent film.

== Composition of standardised varieties ==
The compositions of some standardised varieties are contained in the following table. Proportions of alloying elements in mass percent. Of the available varieties, there are fine gradations of Mg and Mn levels. Mn-free are very rare. Standard alloys are AlMg_{3}Mn, AlMg_{4.5}Mn_{0.7}, as well as for bodywork AlMg_{4.5}Mn_{0.4}. Magnesium levels of up to 5% and manganese content up to 1% are used for wrought alloys.

Mg contents up to 10% are also possible for cast alloys; however, contents of 7% and more are considered heavypourable.

Numerically	abbreviations	Si	Fe	Cu	Mn	Mg	Cr	Zn
EN AW-5005	–	0.3	0.7	0.2	0.2	0.5–1.1	0.1	0.25
EN AW-5052	AlMg2.5	0.25	0.4	0.1	0.1	2.2–2.8	0.15–0.35	0.1
EN AW-5083	AlMg4.5Mn0.7	0.4	0.4	0.1	0.4–1.0	4.0–4.9	0.05–0.25	0.25
EN AW-5454	AlMg3Mn	0.25	0.4	0.1	0.5–1.0	2.4–3.0	0.05–0.2	0.25

== 5000 series ==
5000 series are alloyed with magnesium. 5083 alloy has the highest strength of non-heat-treated alloys. Most 5000 series alloys include manganese as well.

5000 series aluminium alloy nominal composition (% weight) and applications
Alloy	Al contents	Alloying elements	Uses and refs
5005 & 5657	99.2	Mg 0.8	Sheet, plate, rod
5010	99.3	Mg 0.5; Mn 0.2;	
5019	94.7	Mg 5.0; Mn 0.25;	
5024	94.5	Mg 4.6; Mn 0.6; Zr 0.1; Sc 0.2	Extrusions, aerospace
5026	93.9	Mg 4.5; Mn 1; Si 0.9; Fe 0.4; Cu 0.3	
5050	98.6	Mg 1.4	Universal
5052 & 5652	97.2	Mg 2.5; Cr 0.25	Universal, aerospace, marine
5056	94.8	Mg 5.0; Mn 0.12; Cr 0.12	Foil, rod, rivets
5059	93.5	Mg 5.0; Mn 0.8; Zn 0.6; Zr 0.12	rocket cryogenic tanks
5083	94.8	Mg 4.4; Mn 0.7; Cr 0.15	Universal, welding, marine
5086	95.4	Mg 4.0; Mn 0.4; Cr 0.15	Universal, welding, marine
5154 & 5254	96.2	Mg 3.5; Cr 0.25;	Universal, rivets
5182	95.2	Mg 4.5; Mn 0.35;	Sheet
5252	97.5	Mg 2.5;	Sheet
5356	94.6	Mg 5.0; Mn 0.12; Cr 0.12; Ti 0.13	Rod, MIG wire
5454	96.4	Mg 2.7; Mn 0.8; Cr 0.12	Universal
5456	94	Mg 5.1; Mn 0.8; Cr 0.12	Universal
5457	98.7	Mg 1.0; Mn 0.2; Cu 0.1	Sheet, automobile trim
5557	99.1	Mg 0.6; Mn 0.2; Cu 0.1	Sheet, automobile trim
5754	95.8	Mg 3.1; Mn 0.5; Cr 0.3	Sheet, Rod

== Corrosion ==
Aluminium-magnesium alloys are considered to be very corrosion-resistant, making them suitable for marine applications, but this is only true if the $\beta$-phase exists as a non-contiguous phase. Alloys with Mg contents below 3% are therefore always corrosion-resistant, with higher contents, appropriate heat treatment must ensure that this phase is not present as a continuous film at the grain boundaries.

The $\beta'$-phase and the $\beta$-phase are very base compared to aluminium and have an anodic characteristic. AlMg therefore tends to intergranular corrosion if

1. The $\beta$-phase is excreted as a continuous film at the grain boundaries and at the same time
2. the material is in an aggressive environment.

Alloys in states susceptible to intergranular corrosion are annealed at temperatures of 200 °C to 250 °C with slow cooling (heterogeneisation annealing). This changes the $\beta$-phase film in globulite $\beta$-phase and the material is resistant to intergranular corrosion.

== Mechanical properties ==
=== Table ===
Numerical	abbreviations	Condition	Elongation limit [N/mm^{2}]	Tensile strength [N/mm^{2}]	Elongation at break [%]	Brinell hardness	Vickers hardness	Bending strength [N/mm^{2}]	Young's modulus[N/mm^{2}]
5005	AlMg1(B)	O (soft annealed); HX2 (cold-solidified, 1/4-hard); HX4 (cold solidified, 1/2-hard)	45; 125; 145	120; 140; 160	27; 13; 12	30; 40; 45	46; 50; 55	80	69500
5052	AlMg2.5	O; HX2; HX4	90; 175; 200	195; 225; 250	25; 15; 14	50; 65; 70	50; 70; 75	105; 110; 120	70,000
5083	AlMg4.5Mn0.7	O; HX2; HX4	145; 240; 275	300; 330; 360	23; 17; 16	70; 90; 100	75; 95; 105	140	71,000
5454	AlMg3Mn	O; HX2; HX4	110; 205; 235	235; 265; 290	25; 15; 14	60; 75; 80	60; 80; 85	115; 120; 130	70,500

=== Strengths and elongation at break in tensile test ===
The strength is increased by alloying magnesium. At low Mg levels, the increase in strength is relatively strong with higher levels, it is getting weaker and weaker. However, magnesium increases strength very efficiently compared to other elements; per % Mg, so it is stronger than with alternative elements. Even with medium Mg content, the increase in strength by alloying manganese is higher than by additional magnesium, which is also one reason why most AlMg alloys still contain manganese. As a reason for the high increase in strength of magnesium, the high binding energy of vacancies at Mg atoms. These spaces are then no longer available as free spaces. However, these are favourable for plastic deformation.

The yield strength increases linearly with increasing Mg content from about 45 N/mm^{2} at 1% Mg to about 120 N/mm^{2} at 4% Mg. The tensile strength also increases linearly, but with a steeper gradient. With 1% Mg it is about 60 N/mm^{2}, with 4% Mg 240 N/mm^{2}. There are different statements for the elongation at break : Research on alloys based on the purest shows an increasing elongation at break from about 20% elongation at 1% to 30% at 5% Mg Elongation at break: First it drops sharply from 38% elongation and 1% Mg to 34% elongation and about 1.8% Mg, reaches a minimum at 3% Mg with only 32% elongation and then rises again to about 35% Elongation at 5% Mg.

The flow curves for AlMg show the behaviour typical of metallic materials of increasing the flow voltage with the true elongation or forming degree. For all alloys, the increase is relatively strong at low elongations and lower at higher elongations. However, the curves for higher alloy varieties are always above the low-dried. For example, with a true elongation of 0.2, AlMg0.5 has a flow voltage of about 100 N/mm^{2}, AlMg one of 150 N/mm^{2}, AlMg_{3} of 230 N/mm^{2} and AlMg4.5Mn0.4 of about 300 N/mm^{2}. The higher the alloy content and the greater the elongation, the greater the resulting PLC effect and the Lüders effect.

=== Influence of grain size ===
In the case of pure aluminium, the grain size has a minor influence on the strength for metals. In the case of alloys, the influence increases with the alloy content. At 5% Mg, materials with grain sizes of 50 μm achieve uniform elongations of around 0.25, at 250 μm they are around 0.28. AlMg8 already achieves uniform elongations of 0.3 with a grain diameter of 200 μm. With increasing grain size, both the Lüders strain and the Lüders effect decrease.

=== Cold forming and heat treatment ===
In the case of very high degrees of deformation with heavily work-hardened alloys, softening can also occur at room temperature. In a long-term study over 50 years, a decrease in strength could be measured by the end. The decrease is greater the higher the degree of deformation and the higher the alloy content. The softening itself is very pronounced at the beginning and quickly subsides. The effect can be avoided by stabilization annealing at around 120 °C to 170 °C for several hours.
