= 5454 aluminium alloy =

Aluminium magnesium alloy

5454 aluminium–magnesium alloy is an alloy in the wrought aluminium-magnesium family (5000 or 5xxx series). It is closely related to 5154 aluminium alloy. As an aluminium-magnesium alloy, it combines moderate-to-high strength with excellent weldability. Like 5154, 5454 aluminium is commonly used in welded structures such as pressure vessels and ships. As a wrought alloy, it can be formed by rolling, extrusion, and forging (although forging is not common), but not casting. It can be cold worked to produce tempers with a higher strength but a lower ductility. It is generally not clad.

Alternate names and designations include 3.3537, N51, and A95454. The alloy and its various tempers are covered by the following standards:

- ASTM B 209: Standard Specification for Aluminium and Aluminium-Alloy Sheet and Plate
- ASTM B 221: Standard Specification for Aluminium and Aluminium-Alloy Extruded Bars, Rods, Wire, Profiles, and Tubes
- ASTM B 547: Standard Specification for Aluminium and Aluminium-Alloy Formed and Arc-Welded Round Tube
- ISO 6361: Wrought Aluminium and Aluminium Alloy Sheets, Strips and Plates

== Chemical composition ==
The alloy composition of 5454 aluminium is:

- Aluminium: 94.5 to 97.1%
- Chromium: 0.05 to 0.20%
- Copper: 0.1% max
- Iron: 0.4% max
- Magnesium: 2.4 to 3.0%
- Manganese: 0.5 to 1.0%
- Silicon: 0.25% max
- Titanium: 0.2% max
- Zinc: 0.25% max
- Residuals: 0.15% max

== Properties ==
Typical material properties for 5454 aluminium alloy include:

- Density: 2.69 g/cm^{3}, or 168 lb/ft^{3}.
- Young's modulus: 70 GPa, or 10 Msi.
- Electrical conductivity: 34% IACS.
- Ultimate tensile strength: 240 to 300 MPa, or 35 to 44 ksi.
- Thermal Conductivity: 130 W/m-K.
- Thermal Expansion: 22.3 μm/m-K.
