= 5005 aluminium alloy =

Aluminium magnesium alloy

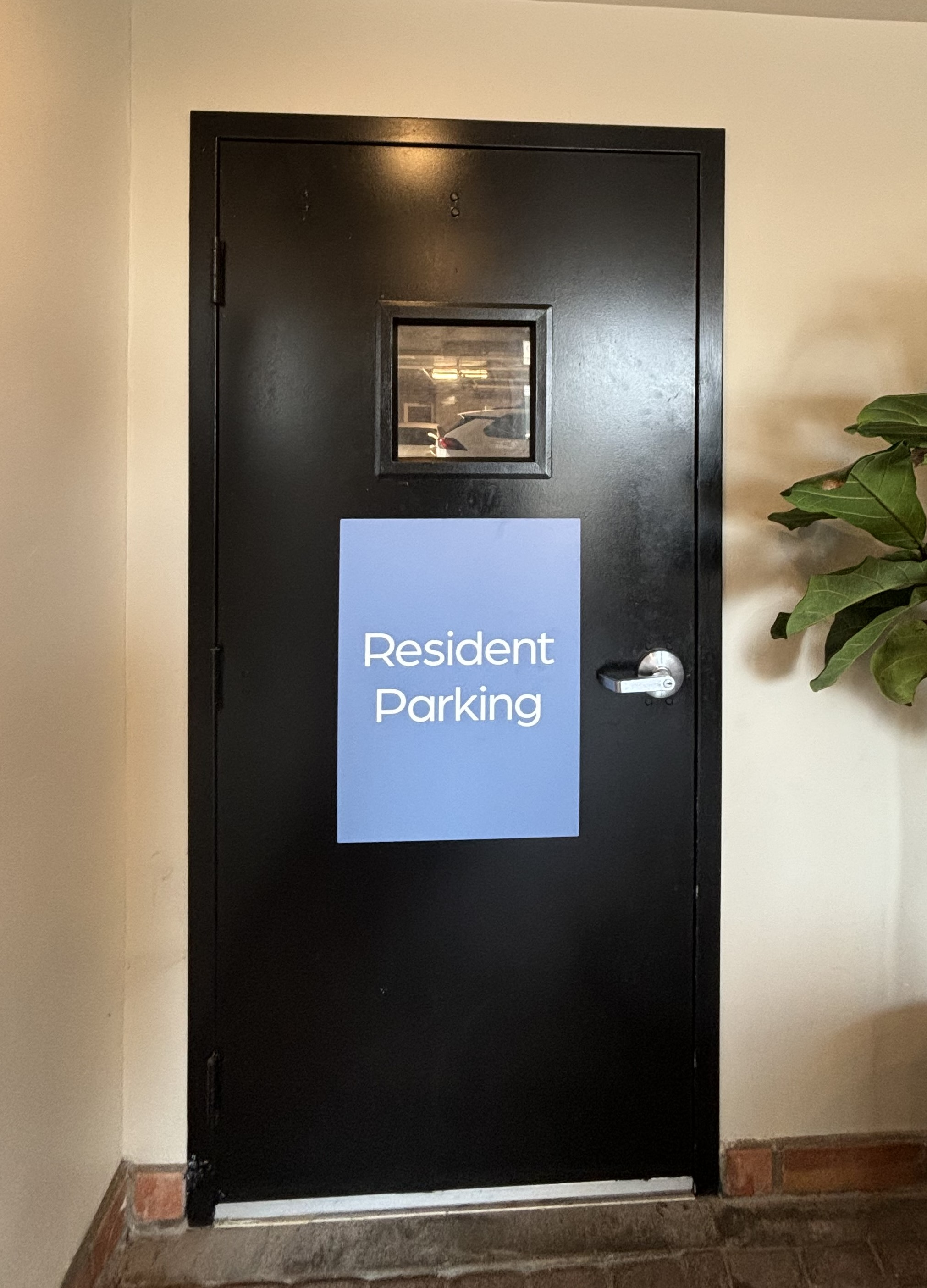
Indoor Aluminum display fixed on the exit door

5005 aluminium alloy is an aluminium–magnesium alloy with good resistance to atmospheric corrosion. It is used in decorative and architectural applications.

It is a member of the 5000 series of aluminium-magnesium wrought alloys. As such, it is not used in casting. It can attain moderate to high strength by cold working, and has relatively high welded strength compared to other aluminium alloy families. Tempers H116 and H321 can be used in fresh and salt water.

== Chemical composition ==
The alloy composition of 5005 is:

- Aluminium: 97.0 to 99.5%
- Chromium: 0.1% max
- Copper: 0.2% max
- Iron: 0.7% max
- Magnesium: 0.5% - 1.1%
- Manganese: 0.2% max
- Residuals: 0.15% max
- Silicon: 0.3% max
- Zinc: 0.25% max

The chemical composition above is very similar also to A5657 alloy.
