= Cleveland Shakespeare Festival =

Community theater company in Ohio, US

- Formation: 1998
- Type: Theatre group
- Artistic director: Rachel Gold
- Website: clevelandshakespeare.org

Cleveland Shakespeare Festival (CSF) is a touring summer theater company based in Cleveland Heights, Ohio. Since its founding in 1998, CSF has produced no fewer than two classical theater productions each summer, offered free of admission at public parks in communities across Northeast Ohio.

== History ==
For the first two seasons (1998, 1999) CSF was led by Artistic Director Tim Perfect, producing plays including A Midsummer Night's Dream and Henry V exclusively at the Mather Mansion on the campus of Case Western Reserve University (CWRU). Starting in 2000, artistic director, Larry Nehring expanded the company's reach by presenting work both outside the Shaker Heights public library and on the campus of Cuyahoga Community College, Western Campus in Parma.

Tyson Douglas Rand, the company's third director starting in 2009, expanded upon the company's original mission, sending the company to one-night stands for performances in a wide variety of venues, from the James A. Garfield National Historic Site in Mentor, to BayARts in Bay Village, and numerous others.

Dusten Welch, CSF's fourth director, kept the festival producing through the Covid-19 pandemic, producing online, episodic films of Julius Caesar and The Comedy of Errors, released in 2020, before resuming live performances in 2021.

Rachel Gold became the fifth CSF Artistic Director in 2024, increasing the company's off-season offerings, including the 2026 CabaretShakes series, featuring scenes from Shakespeare, performed at a downtown Cleveland restaurant.

== Reception ==
Cleveland Shakespeare Festival has been embraced by the Greater Cleveland community, voted "Best Outdoor Theatre Experience" by Cleveland Scene in 2015.

== Notable artists ==
The most notable former CSF company member to date is Rich Sommer, a CWRU MFA graduate who has been featured on the AMC series Mad Men the Netflix series GLOW. Sommer performed the role of Jacques in As You Like It in 2002.
