= Hirakud =

Hirakud Town
- Town
- Location in Odisha, India Hirakud Town (India)
- Coordinates: 21.52°N 83.87°E
- Country: India
- State: Odisha
- District: Sambalpur
- Elevation: 160 m (520 ft)

Population (2011)
  - Total: 30,207

Languages
  - Official: Odia
  - Local: Sambalpuri
- Time zone: UTC+5:30 (IST)
- Vehicle registration: OD
- Website: odisha.gov.in

Hirakud is a small township located in Sambalpur in Odisha. It was a Notified Area Council (NAC) which was later included along with Burla in Sambalpur city to become a Municipal Corporation. This city is a hub of HINDALCO, an Indian aluminium and copper manufacturing company. Hirakud Dam, is one of the most visited tourist spot. It is one of the longest and largest dams in the world. It is constructed across the Mahanadi river between the Gandhi Minar in North and the Nehru Minar in the South, which connects these two hills. The shoreline spans around 640 km. This dam had a generating capacity of 290MW.

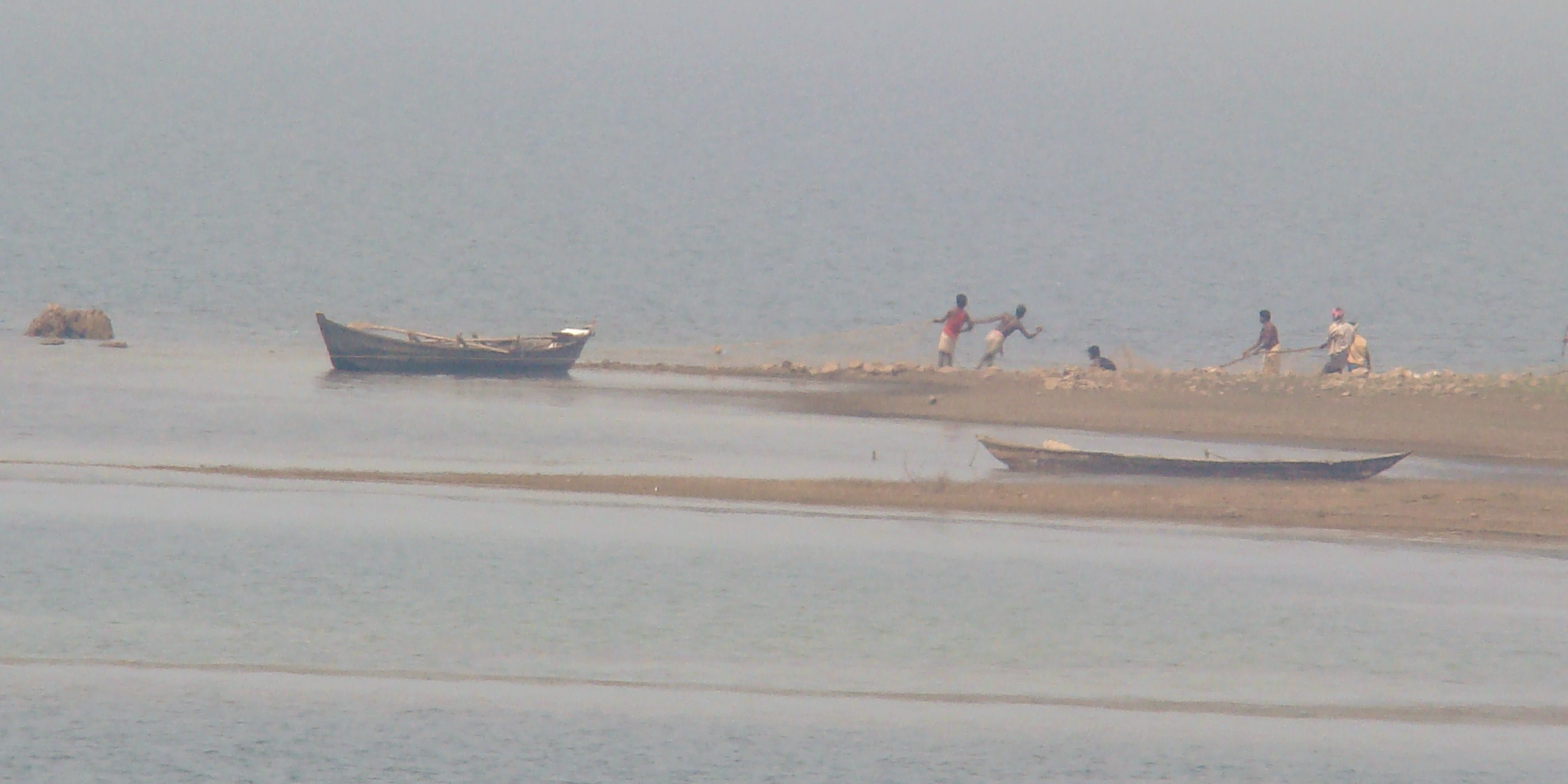
Fisherman working near the left dyke of Hirakud Dam

== Climate ==
Climate data for Hirakud (1991–2020)
Month	Jan	Feb	Mar	Apr	May	Jun	Jul	Aug	Sep	Oct	Nov	Dec	Year
Record high °C (°F)	34.1 (93.4)	36.7 (98.1)	41.9 (107.4)	45.5 (113.9)	46.1 (115.0)	46.6 (115.9)	37.5 (99.5)	35.8 (96.4)	36.1 (97.0)	36.3 (97.3)	34.1 (93.4)	32.6 (90.7)	46.6 (115.9)
Mean daily maximum °C (°F)	28.3 (82.9)	30.8 (87.4)	35.2 (95.4)	39.9 (103.8)	40.5 (104.9)	37.3 (99.1)	31.7 (89.1)	31.7 (89.1)	32.6 (90.7)	32.3 (90.1)	30.8 (87.4)	28.6 (83.5)	32.9 (91.2)
Mean daily minimum °C (°F)	13.0 (55.4)	15.6 (60.1)	20.0 (68.0)	23.6 (74.5)	26.1 (79.0)	26.0 (78.8)	24.2 (75.6)	24.1 (75.4)	24.4 (75.9)	21.7 (71.1)	18.1 (64.6)	13.6 (56.5)	19.9 (67.8)
Record low °C (°F)	3.6 (38.5)	9.6 (49.3)	13.9 (57.0)	17.1 (62.8)	17.2 (63.0)	16.8 (62.2)	19.6 (67.3)	19.3 (66.7)	19.8 (67.6)	14.4 (57.9)	11.0 (51.8)	7.8 (46.0)	3.6 (38.5)
Average rainfall mm (inches)	13.7 (0.54)	12.9 (0.51)	17.3 (0.68)	17.8 (0.70)	34.3 (1.35)	228.4 (8.99)	390.5 (15.37)	455.5 (17.93)	231.7 (9.12)	49.5 (1.95)	6.0 (0.24)	4.5 (0.18)	1,462 (57.56)
Average rainy days	1.0	1.1	1.4	1.9	2.5	9.5	16.2	16.2	10.3	3.0	0.7	0.6	64.4
Average relative humidity (%) (at 17:30 IST)	60	51	46	40	41	58	83	84	81	73	68	64	61
Source: India Meteorological Department

== Demography ==
Hirakud is a Notified Area Council city in district of Sambalpur, Odisha. The Hirakud city is divided into 17 wards for which elections are held every 5 years. The Hirakud Notified Area Committee has population of 30,207 of which 15,698 are males while 14,509 are females as per report released by Census India 2011.

The population of children aged 0-6 is 3513 which is 11.63% of total population of Hirakud (NAC). In Hirakud Notified Area Committee, the female sex ratio is 924 against state average of 979. Moreover, the child sex ratio in Hirakud is around 903 compared to Orissa state average of 941. The literacy rate of Hirakud city is 84.00% higher than the state average of 72.87%. In Hirakud, male literacy is around 90.39% while the female literacy rate is 77.11%.

Hirakud Notified Area Committee has total administration over 6,963 houses to which it supplies basic amenities like water and sewerage. It is also authorized to build roads within Notified Area Committee limits and impose taxes on properties coming under its jurisdiction.

== Economy ==
Hirakud was conceptualized as an industrial town by the erstwhile Chief Minister of Odisha, Biju Patnaik. On completion of the Hirakud Dam, power intensive industries such as aluminium smelters, cable manufacturing, steel re-rolling mills etc. established their presence in Hirakud. In the 1970s, Hirakud was a major industrial centre of Odisha, perhaps second only to Rourkela. At this point in time however, the main functional industry at Hirakud is the aluminium smelter of Hindalco and its associated units. As rural communities around Hirakud are primarily dependent on agriculture, Fertilizer Corporation of India (FCI) Hirakud helps in storing and managing the food grains of nearby districts as well.

== Educational institutions ==
- Hirakud College
- Hirakud ITI, Hirakud, one of the oldest and premier institution in Odisha established in the year of 1956, is imparting training in western part of the state and different trades have been introduced from time to time considering the need of industries.
- Govt Boys and Girls High School Two high schools, one for boys and another for girls is being run by State Govt of Odisha.
- Saraswati shishu vidya mandir The school is in odiya medium . Saraswati shishu vidya mandir is a unique institution based on Indian tradition and culture. In all over India there are approximately 25,000 institutions running under the guidance of Vidya bharati. "Shiksha Vikash Samiti, Orissa" is a registered organization affiliated to Vidya Bharati.It is having classes from nursery to class Tenth.

== Banking Facilities ==
Three nationalised banks i.e. State Bank of India, Andhra Bank, HDFC Bank and UCO Bank are currently functioning in hirakud . Besides the ATM facilities of all the above banks and Axis bank, ICICI bank, Punjab National Bank etc are also present .
