= List of references to Cleveland in popular culture =

This is a list of references to Cleveland in popular culture. Founded in 1796 near the mouth of the Cuyahoga River, Cleveland is a major city in the U.S. state of Ohio and the county seat of Cuyahoga County. The city is located along the southern shore of Lake Erie, across the U.S. maritime border with Canada and approximately 60 miles (97 km) west of the Ohio-Pennsylvania state border. Cleveland has been used as the site of numerous books, films, music, and television shows; as well as being mentioned or referenced in many others. Below is a partial list.

== Print ==
- The Old Man and the Sea - "The Yankees cannot lose." "But I fear the Indians of Cleveland."
- The setting of Calvin and Hobbes is suburb Chagrin Falls.
- The comic American Splendor is set in Cleveland. A 2003 movie about the comic, also titled American Splendor, was produced and set in Cleveland.

== Television ==
- Seinfeld - In "The Heart Attack", Tor tells Jerry that his note reads, "Cleveland 117, San Antonio, 109."
- The Drew Carey Show is set in Cleveland.
- Hot in Cleveland is set in Cleveland.
- The 30 Rock episode "Cleveland" is partially set in Cleveland, and the show’s characters refer to it as a type of Shangri-La.
- The character Ted Mosby in How I Met Your Mother is from Cleveland and the show contains various references.
- The Family Guy/The Cleveland Show character Cleveland Brown's name is a reference to the Cleveland Indians because he was conceived during a game.

== Film ==
- 12 Angry Men (1957) - Juror #7 wants to get out of jury duty quickly because he has tickets to the ball game between the "Yanks and Cleveland."
- The boxing-match-turned-riot near the start of Raging Bull (1980) is set in the Cleveland Arena in 1941.
- The cult-classic mockumentary This Is Spinal Tap (1984) includes a memorable scene where the parody band gets lost backstage just before performing at a Cleveland rock concert (origin of the phrase "Hello, Cleveland!").
- Howard the Duck (1986), George Lucas' heavily criticized adaptation of the Marvel comic of the same name, begins with the title character crashing into Cleveland after drifting in outer space.
- Michael J. Fox and Joan Jett play the sibling leads of a Cleveland rock group in Light of Day (1987); directed by Paul Schrader, much of the film was shot in the city.
- The 1989 film Major League and its 1994 sequel Major League II are set in Cleveland.
- Kevin Bacon stars in Telling Lies in America (1997), the semi-autobiographical tale of Clevelander Joe Eszterhas, a former reporter for The Plain Dealer.
- Cleveland serves as the setting for fictitious insurance giant Great Benefit in The Rainmaker (1997); in the film, Key Tower doubles as the firm's main headquarters.
- Detroit Rock City (1999) features a group of Cleveland teenagers trying to scam their way into a Kiss concert.
- The 2002 film Welcome to Collinwood is set in Cleveland.
- The 2006 film The Oh in Ohio is set in Cleveland.
- The 2008 film The Rocker is set in Cleveland.
- The 2011 film Kill the Irishman is set in Cleveland.
- The 2012 teenage comedy Fun Size takes place in and around Cleveland.
- The 2014 film Draft Day is a film about a fictional manager of the Cleveland Browns.
- The 2016 film The Land, directed by Steven Caple Jr, is set in Cleveland and contains numerous shots of Cleveland.
- The 2020 film Get Out of Home, directed by and starring Cleveland filmmaker Tony Bialowas, starts in Cleveland and contains references to Cleveland.

== Music ==
- "Cuyahoga" on R.E.M.’s 1986 album Lifes Rich Pageant is a reference to the Cuyahoga River in Cleveland.
- "Cleveland Rocks" appears on Ian Hunter’s 1979 album You're Never Alone with a Schizophrenic. The song was covered by the Presidents of the United States of America and used on The Drew Carey Show as a theme.
- Randy Newman’s song "Burn On" from his 1972 album Sail Away is about the Cuyahoga River and Cleveland. The entire song is played in the opening segment of the movie Major League.
- "The Heart of Rock & Roll" by Huey Lewis and the News references Cleveland as being the heart of rock & roll. Originally, the song lyric was going to be "The heart of rock and roll is in Cleveland," rather than "The heart of rock and roll is still beating."
- Kid Cudi, a Shaker Heights native, alludes to cold Cleveland weather in "Cleveland is the Reason", on A Kid Named Cudi. He also says it's the reason for his sadness in "Cuyahoga Blues." In an interview about working on 808s & Heartbreak he said, "Cleveland wasn’t fit for me as a city. A kid with big dreams I mean, there’s not much in Cleveland to do to accomplish all those goals that I had."
- "Ohio (Come Back to Texas)" by Bowling for Soup references a girl who "went to Cleveland with some guy named Leland that she met at the bank." The song also mentions the singers' affinity for Cleveland-native Drew Carey and the city's Rock and Roll Hall of Fame.
- Jackson Browne's song "My Cleveland Heart" from his 2021 album Downhill From Everywhere references the Cleveland Clinic.
- Taylor Swift's song "Cleveland!" from the deluxe edition of her 2025 album The Life of a Showgirl: The Encore references Cleveland, specifically Cleveland Heights. The official lyric video of the song features footage of Cleveland, including visuals of the Cleveland skyline.
