= Mayfran International =

- Company type: Public
- Industry: Machinery
- Founded: 1933
- Founder: George Meyfarth; A.J. Franz
- Headquarters: Cleveland, Ohio, United States
- Number of locations: 6 production facilities 14 sales and services offices
- Area served: Worldwide
- Key people: Masatoshi Okada (President)
- Products: Conveyors; Chip processing Coolant filtration
- Website: www.mayfran.com

Mayfran International is an International company that sells customized or adapted products and systems that process materials and fluids in automated manufacturing and scrap management operations. It operates six production facilities and 14 sales and service offices, and the company operates throughout the U.S., Canada, China, the Czech Republic, France, Germany, Italy, India, Japan, Korea, the Netherlands, and the United Kingdom.

Mayfran Engineering Company was founded by George Meyfarth and A.J. Franz in Cleveland, Ohio, in 1933 as a general industrial engineering firm. In the 1950s, after developing a number of technological innovations, including its patented "hinged steel belt", the company began to focus more closely on the metal working industry, developing products and systems for machining, stamping and scrap handling operations. Since September 2012, Mayfran is a member of the Tsubakimoto Chain Group, of Osaka, Japan.

In August 2015, the company appointed Frank Sraj as vice president of sales and marketing.

== Products ==
Mayfran produces shredders for chip processing, conveyors to move the chips, and filter systems. They developed a general-purpose separator called ConSep Flex.
