= Renusagar Power Plant =

Indian coal-based thermal power plant

Coordinates: 24.1816°N 82.7920°E

Renusagar Power plant is a coal based captive thermal power plant located near Renukoot in Sonbhadra district in the Indian state of Uttar Pradesh. The power plant is operated by the Hindalco Industries and gives power to the smelter (integrated plant), Renukoot for production of aluminium.

== Capacity ==
It has an installed capacity of 801.57 MW (it has 10 generating units of various capacities). The plant is functional.
