= 5052 aluminium alloy =

Aluminium-magnesium alloy

A5052

Physical properties
- Density (ρ): 2.68 g/cm^{3}

Mechanical properties
- Young's modulus (E): 69.3 GPa (10,050 ksi)
- Tensile strength (σ_{t}): 195–290 MPa (28.3–42.1 ksi)
- Elongation (ε) at break: 7-27%
- Poisson's ratio (ν): 0.33

Thermal properties
- Melting temperature (T_{m}): 607 °C (1,125 °F)
- Thermal conductivity (k): 138 W/m*K
- Linear thermal expansion coefficient (α): 2.38*10^{−5} K^{−1}
- Specific heat capacity (c): 880 J/kg*K

Electrical properties
- Volume resistivity (ρ): 49.3-49.9 nOhm*m

5052 is an aluminium–magnesium alloy, primarily alloyed with magnesium and chromium. 5052 is not a heat treatable aluminum alloy, but can be hardened through cold working.

== Chemical properties ==
The alloy composition of 5052 is:

- Magnesium - 2.2%-2.8% by weight
- Chromium - 0.15%-0.35% maximum
- Copper - 0.1% maximum
- Iron - 0.4% maximum
- Manganese - 0.1% maximum
- Silicon - 0.25% maximum
- Zinc - 0.1% maximum
- Remainder Aluminium

A similar alloy A5652 exists differing only in impurities limits.

== Mechanical properties ==
Tensile Strengths
Hardening	Ultimate MPa (PSI)	Yield MPa (PSI)	Tensile Strength acc. ASTM B209 [KSI]	Yield Strength acc. ASTM B209 [KSI]
O	195 (28000)	89.6 (13000)		
H32	228 (33000)	193 (28000)	31.0 - 38.0	>23.0
H34	262 (38000)	214 (31000)	34.0 - 41.0	>26.0
H36	276 (40000)	241 (35000)	37.0 - 44.0	>29.0
H38	290 (42000)	255 (37000)	>39.0	>32.0

== Uses ==
Typical applications include marine, aircraft, architecture, general sheet metal work, heat exchangers, fuel lines and tanks, flooring panels, streetlights, appliances, rivets and wire.

The exceptional corrosion resistance of 5052 alloy against seawater and salt spray makes it a primary candidate for the failure-sensitive large marine structures, like tanks of liquefied natural gas tankers.

== Weldability ==
Weldability – Gas: Good

Weldability – Arc: Very Good

Weldability – Resistance: Very Good

Brazability: Acceptable

Solderability: Not recommended
