= China Zhongwang =

Industrial aluminium extrusion company

China Zhongwang Holdings Limited 中国忠旺控股有限公司
- Type: Public company
- Traded as: SEHK: 1333
- Industry: Aluminium fabrication and processing
- Founded: 1993; 33 years ago
- Headquarters: Liaoyang, Liaoning, China
- Area served: Worldwide
- Key people: Lu Changqing (Chairman)
- Website: www.zhongwang.com

China Zhongwang Holdings Limited (Chinese: 中国忠旺控股有限公司) is a Chinese industrial aluminium manufacturer headquartered in Liaoyang, Liaoning Province. The company specializes in high-precision and large-section aluminium products used in transportation, engineering, and industrial sectors. It was listed on the Hong Kong Stock Exchange in 2009 but its trading has been suspended since 2021.

== Corporate Affairs ==
Founder Liu Zhongtian served as chairman until 2017. He was succeeded by Lu Changqing, who continues to serve as executive director, chairman, and president. Zhongwang previously exported products to the United States, Germany, Japan, and other markets, though export volumes have declined following trade disputes and legal scrutiny.

== History ==
Founded in 1993 by Liu Zhongtian, Zhongwang expanded rapidly through the 2000s and completed a US$1.26 billion IPO in May 2009—then the largest globally that year. In 2011, the company began developing its aluminium flat rolling business and invested over US$3.8 billion into production equipment and facilities in Tianjin.

In 2019, the U.S. Department of Justice charged Zhongwang with allegedly evading US$1.8 billion in anti-dumping duties by disguising aluminium exports as pallets. The company denied the accusations. Trading in China Zhongwang shares was suspended on August 30, 2021.

== Operations ==
Zhongwang's business operates through three main segments:

- Industrial aluminium extrusion
- Deep processing (chassis, pallets, structural parts)
- Flat rolling (aluminium plates and foils, up to 3 million tonnes capacity)
