= Beck Center for the Arts =

Cleveland theatre

Coordinates: 41.4842°N 81.8202°W

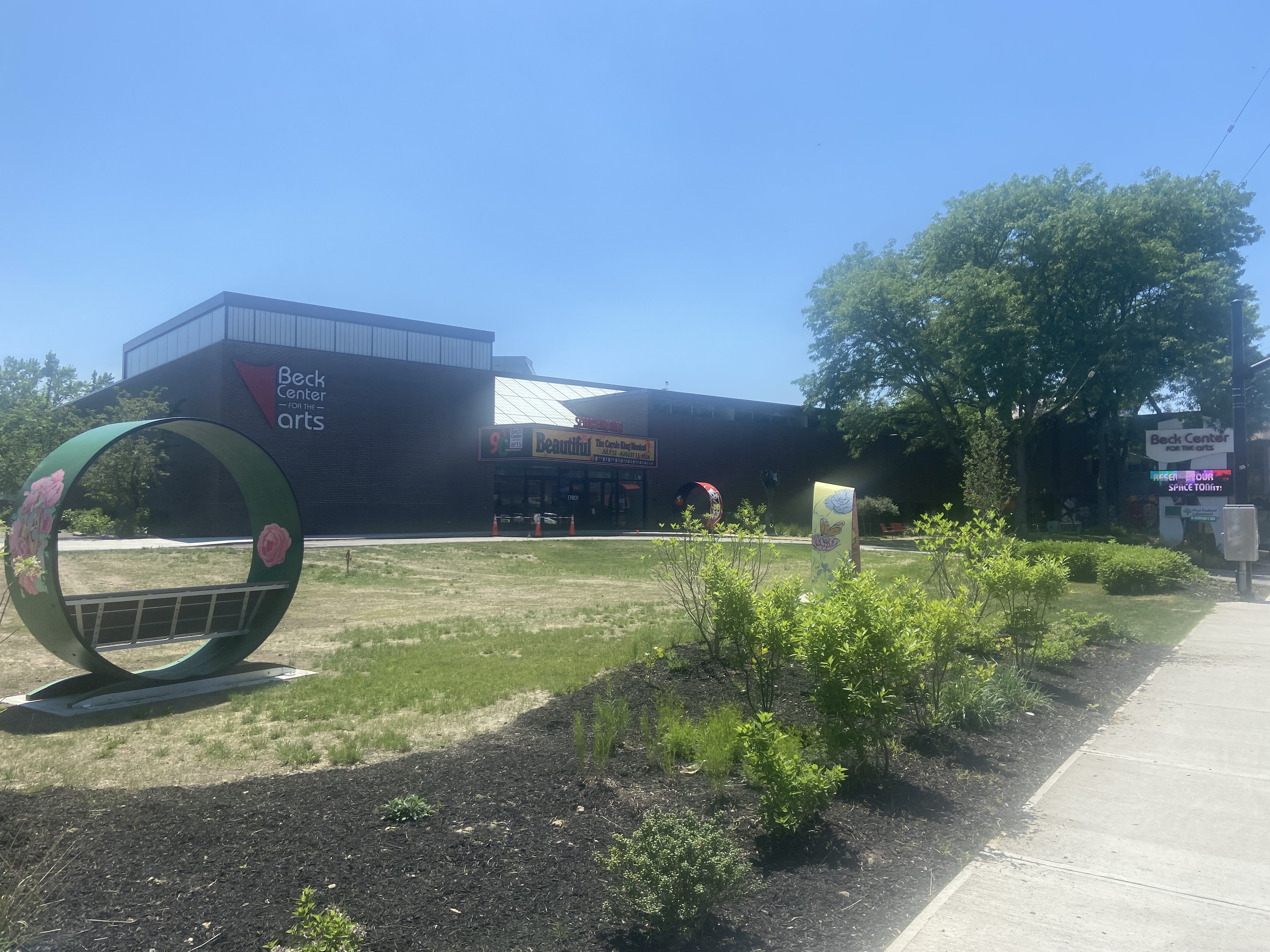
- The Beck Center
- Formation: 1931
- Type: Theatre group
- Location: 17801 Detroit Avenue Lakewood, Ohio 44107
- Website: beckcenter.org

Beck Center for the Arts in Lakewood, Ohio, is a non-profit, performing arts and arts education organization. It is the largest theater and arts center on Cleveland's West Shore, educating and entertaining over 65,000 people per year. On its 3.5 acres (1.4 ha) campus, Beck Center houses two stages producing live theater for children, teens and adults; two gallery spaces, and over thirty classrooms for educational programming for children and adults. It offers classes in visual arts, music, theater and dance.

The Beck Center was originally named the "Guild of the Masques" when it was founded by Richard Kay in 1929; formally incorporating as the Lakewood Little Theatre in 1933. The group moved onto its current site in Lakewood, Ohio in a theater originally designed for the movies, the Lucier, in 1938. They redesigned the interior space for live plays and purchased the building in 1943. In the following decades, the group bought up contiguous land, and, in 1972 began a capital campaign to build a new center. They were successful in raising $600,000 which was matched by ad exec Kenneth C. Beck and the current Beck Center was built in 1975.

Beck Center for the Arts hosts the longest running youth theater program in the United States, running for nearly seventy years.

== Productions ==
=== 2024-2025 Season Professional Theater ===
Show	Date	Location
The Sunshine Boys	September 13 - October 6	Senney Theater
The Glass Menagerie	October 4 - November 3	Studio Theater
Joseph and the Amazing Technicolor Dreamcoat	December 6 -January 5	Senney Theater
Waitress: The Musical	February 14 - March 9	Senney Theater
Under a Baseball Sky	April 4 - May 4	Studio Theater
The Robber Bridegroom	May 30 - June 29	Studio Theater
A Chorus Line	July 11 - August 10	Senney Theater

=== 2024-2025 Season Youth Theater ===
Show	Date	Location
The Monster Bash of Dreadstone Manor	October 24 - October 27	Senney Theater
Channeling Grimm	December 13 - December 22	Studio Theater
The Tempest	February 28 - March 9	Studio Theater
Between the Lines	May 2 - May 11	Senney Theater

=== 2023-2024 Season Professional Theater ===
Show	Date	Location
Doubt: A Parable	May 26 - June 25	Studio Theater
Once On This Island	July 7 – August 6	Senney Theater
Cat's-Paw	September 22– October 22	Studio Theater
Joseph and the Amazing Technicolor Dreamcoat	December 1– December 30	Senney Theater
Ride the Cyclone	February 9 – February 25	Senney Theater
Jitney	April 5 – May 5	Studio Theater
A Doll's House, Part 2	May 31—June 30	Studio Theater
Beautiful, the Carole King Musical	July 12– August 11	Senney Theater

=== 2023-2024 Season Youth Theater ===
Show	Date	Location
It's A Madhouse	October 26 - Oct 29, 2023	Senney Theater
Going Medieval: A Ye Olde Comedie	December 8 - December 17	Studio Theater
Mean Girls (High School Version)	March 3 - March 24	Senney Theater
The Wizard of Oz	May 10- May 19	Senney Theater

=== 2022-2023 Season Professional Theater ===
Show	Date	Location
Buyer & Cellar	September 9- October 9	Studio Theater
The Curious Incident of the Dog in the Night-Time	September 23- October 16	Senney Theater
Elf the Musical	December 2- December 30	Senney Theater
Ghost the Musical	February 10- February 26	Senney Theater
Noises Off	March 24- April 16	Senney Theater
Doubt: A Parable	May 26- June 25	Studio Theater
Once On This Island	July 7- August 6	Senney Theater

=== 2022-2023 Season Youth Theater ===
Show	Date	Location
The Canterbury Tales Or... Geoffrey Chaucer's Flying Circus	November 3 -November 6	Senney Theater
The Best Christmas Pageant Ever	December 9 - December 18	Studio Theater
William Shakespeare's Land of the Dead	March 3 - March 12	Studio Theater
Once Upon a Mattress	May 5 - May 14	Senney Theater

=== 2021-2022 Season Professional Theater ===
Show	Date	Location
Broadway Bound	September 10- October 3	Senney Theater
The Exonerated	October 8- November 7	Studio Theater
Elf the Musical	December 30- January 2	Senney Theater
Lizzie	February 4- February 26	Senney Theater
Meteor Shower	April 1- May 1	Studio Theater
The Legend of Georgia McBride	May 27- June 26	Studio Theater
Something Rotten!	July 8- August 7	Senney Theater

=== 2021- 2022 Season Youth Theater ===
Show	Date	Location
Little Tech Class of Horrors: When Good Science Goes Bad	October 22- October 24	Senney Theater
The Real Valkyries of Valhalla	December 10- December 19	Studio Theater
Disney's: High School Musical	March 18- March 27	Senney Theater
Bugsy Malone	May 6- May 15	Senney Theater

=== 2020-2021 Season Professional Theater ===
Show	Date	Location
Fully Committed	November 13- December 6	Online
5 New Musicals X 15 Minutes	February 12 - February 28	Online
Beck Broadway Alums in Concert	March 5- March 28	Online
This Girl Laughs, This Girl Cries, This Girl Does Nothing	July 23- August 8	Senney Theater

=== 2020-2021 Season Youth Theater ===
Show	Date	Location
Zopp	October 22- October 25	Online
A Christmas Peril	December 10 - December 13	Online
The Teen Untitled Sketch Show	March 25- March 28	Online
Honk, Jr.	May 20- May 24	Online

=== 2019-2020 Season Professional Theater ===
Show	Date	Location
Glengarry Glen Ross	September 13 - October 6	Mackey Theater
The Member of the Wedding	October 4 - November 3	Studio Theater
Shrek the Musical	December 6 - January 5	Mackey Theater
The Scottsboro Boys	February 7 - February 23	Mackey Theater
Meteor Shower	April 3 - May 3	Studio Theater
Disgraced	May 29- June 28	Studio Theater
Something Rotten!	July 10 - August 9	Mackey Theater

=== 2019-2020 Season Youth Theater ===
Show	Date	Location
The Trials of Robinhood	October 24 - October 27	Mackey Theater
Once Upon a Decade	December 13 - December 22	Studio Theater
Mockingbird	February 28 - March 8	Studio Theater

=== 2018-2019 Season Professional Theater ===
Show	Date	Location
An Act of God	September 14 - October 7	Mackey Theater
Who's Afraid of Virginia Woolf?	October 5 - November 4	Studio Theater
Shrek the Musical	December 7 - January 6	Mackey Theater
Once	February 8 - February 24	Mackey Theater
Lady Day at Emerson's Bar & Grill	March 15 - April 14	Studio Theater
King Lear	May 31 - June 30	Studio Theater
Matilda the Musical	July 12 - August 11	Mackey Theater

=== 2018-2019 Season Youth Theater Presented by the Mort and Iris Philanthropic Fund ===
Show	Date	Location
Cinderella	October 26 - October 28	Mackey Theater
Law & Order: Nursery Rhyme Unit	December 14 - December 23	Studio Theater
13	April 5 - April 14	Mackey Theater
Seussical	May 10 - May 19	Mackey Theater

=== 2017-2018 Season Professional Theater ===
Show	Date	Location
One Flew Over the Cuckoo's Nest	September 15 - October 8	Mackey Theater
Waiting for Godot	October 6 - November 5	Studio Theater
The Little Mermaid	December 1 - December 31	Mackey Theater
Hair	February 9 - February 25	Mackey Theater
My First Time	March 30 - April 29	Studio Theater
Bent	June 1 - July 1	Studio Theater
Gypsy	July 6 - August 12	Mackey Theater

=== 2017-2018 Season Youth Theater Presented by the Mort and Iris Philanthropic Fund ===
Show	Date	Location
Snow White's Adventures	October 26 - October 29	Mackey Theater
All Greek to Me	December 8 - December 17	Studio Theater
The Laramie Project	March 2 - March 11	Studio Theater
Annie	May 11 - May 20	Mackey Theater

=== 2016-2017 Season Professional Theater ===
Show	Date	Location
Ruthless!	September 16 - October 16	Mackey Theater
Body Awareness	October 7 - November 6	Studio Theater
Disney's The Little Mermaid	December 2 - December 31	Mackey Theater
Bring It On The Musical	February 10 - February 26	Mackey Theater
A Great Wilderness	March 3 - April 9	Studio Theater
Really Really	June 2 - July 2	Studio Theater
City of Angels	July 7 - August 13	Mackey Theater

=== 2016-2017 Season Youth Theater Presented by the Mort and Iris Philanthropic Fund ===
Show	Date	Location
Alice's Adventures in Wonderland	November 4 - November 6	Mackey Theater
AARGH!	December 10 - December 18	Studio Theater
Carrie the Musical	March 24 - April 2	Mackey Theater
Schoolhouse Rock Live	May 12 - May 21	Mackey Theater

=== 2015-2016 Season Professional Theater ===
Show	Date	Location
The Spitfire Grill	September 18 - October 18	Mackey Main Stage
Mothers and Sons	October 9 - November 15	Studio Theater
Mary Poppins	December 4 - January 3	Mackey Main Stage
In the Heights	February 12 - February 28	Mackey Main Stage
Shining City	April 1 - May 1	Studio Theater
Heathers the Musical	May 27 - July 2	Studio Theater
Billy Elliot the Musical	July 8 - August 14	Mackey Main Stage

=== 2015-2016 Season Youth Theater ===
Show	Date	Location
A Little Princess	November 5 - November 8	Mackey Main Stage
Happily Forever After	December 11 - December 20	Studio Theater
Bright Ideas	February 2 - March 6	Studio Theater
Big the Musical	May 13 - May 22	Mackey Main Stage

=== 2014-2015 Season Professional Theater ===
Show	Date	Location
Forever Plaid	September 12 - October 12	Mackey Main Stage
[Title of Show]	October 10 - November 16	Studio Theater
Mary Poppins	December 5 - January 4	Mackey Main Stage
Dogfight	February 6 - March 15	Studio Theater
Lend Me a Tenor	March 27 - April 26	Mackey Main Stage
The Young Man From Atlanta	May 29 - June 28	Studio Theater
American Idiot	July 10 - August 16	Mackey Main Stage

=== 2014-2015 Season Youth Theater ===
Show	Date	Location
Mr. Toad's Mad Adventures	November 6 - November 9	Mackey Main Stage
Hillbilly Holiday	December 12 - December 21	Studio Theater
Chicago	February 20 - March 1	Mackey Main Stage
Oliver!	May 15 - May 24	Mackey Main Stage

=== 2013-2014 Season Professional Theater ===
Show	Date	Location
She Loves Me	September 20 - October 20	Mackey Main Stage
33 Variations	October 11 - November 17	Studio Theater
Annie	December 6 - January 5	Mackey Main Stage
Carrie the Musical	February 7 - March 9	Mackey Main Stage
'night, Mother	March 21 - May 4	Studio Theater
Seminar: A Comedy	May 30 - June 29	Studio Theater
Young Frankenstein	July 11 - August 17	Mackey Main Stage

=== 2013-2014 Season Youth Theater ===
Show	Date	Location
The Pied Piper of Hamelin	November 7 - November 10	Mackey Main Stage
Law and Order: Fairy Tale Unit	December 13 - December 22	Studio Theater
The Children's Hour	February 21 - March 2	Mackey Main Stage
The Wizard of Oz	May 9 - May 18	Mackey Main Stage

=== 2012-2013 Season Professional Theater ===
Show	Date	Location
Xanadu	September 14 - October 14	Mackey Main Stage
The Little Dog Laughed	October 5 - November 11	Studio Theater
Annie	December 7 - January 6	Mackey Main Stage
Next to Normal	March 1 - April 21	Studio Theater
The House of Blue Leaves	March 22 - April 21	Mackey Main Stage
The Pitmen Painters	May 31 - July 7	Studio Theater
Monty Python's Spamalot	July 12 - August 18	Mackey Main Stage

=== 2012-2013 Season Youth Theater ===
Show	Date
Our Town	November 1 - November 4
Going Medieval: A Ye Olde Comedy	December 14 - December 23
Avenue Q: School Edition	February 8 - February 17
Bye Bye Birdie!	May 10 - May 19

=== 2011-2012 Season Professional Theater ===
Show	Date	Location
The Marvelous Wondrettes	September 16 - October 16	Mackey Main Stage
Race	October 21 - November 20	Studio Theater
Joseph and the Amazing Technicolor Dreamcoat	December 2 - December 31	Mackey Main Stage
Spring Awakening	February 3 - March 4	Mackey Main Stage
The Velocity of Autumn	March 23 - April 29	Studio Theater
Bloody Bloody Andrew Jackson	May 25 - July 1	Studio Theater
Legally Blonde: The Musical	July 6 - August 12	Mackey Main Stage

=== 2011-2012 Season Youth Theater ===
Show	Date
Charlotte's Web	November 3 - November 6
Best Christmas Pageant Ever	December 9 - December 18
Reckless	February 24 - March 4
Roald Dahl's Willy Wonka	May 4 - May 13

=== 2010-2011 Season Professional Theater ===
Show	Date	Location
My Fair Lady	September 17 - October 17	Mackey Main Stage
Wings	October 8 - November 7	Studio Theater
Joseph and the Amazing Technicolor Dreamcoat	December 3 - January 2	Mackey Main Stage
Jerry Springer: The Opera	February 18 - March 27	Studio Theater
The Underpants	April 1 - April 23	Mackey Main Stage
Hairspray	July 8 - August 14	Mackey Main Stage

=== 2010-2011 Season Youth Theater ===
Show	Date
Tom Sawyer	October 27 - October 31
Once Upon a Decade	November 10 - November 19
Into the Woods	February 25 - March 6
Cats	May 13 - May 21

=== 2009-2010 Season Professional Theater ===
Show	Date	Location
Fiddler on the Roof	September 19 - October 18	Mackey Main Stage
Peter Pan	December 4 - January 3	Mackey Main Stage
Is He Dead?	February 5 - February 28	Mackey Main Stage
The 25th Annual Putnam County Spelling Bee	March 26 - April 25	Mackey Main Stage
The Producers	July 16 - August 22	Mackey Main Stage

=== 2009-2010 Season Youth Theater ===
Show	Date	Location
The Lion, The Witch, and The Wardrobe	November 5 - November 8	Mackey Main Stage
All Greek to Me	December 11 - December 20	Studio Theater
Twelve Angry Jurors	February 19 - February 28	Studio Theater
Seussical The Musical!	May 14 - May 22	Mackey Main Stage
