= 5154 aluminium alloy =

Wrought aluminium magnesium alloy

5154 aluminium alloy is an alloy in the wrought aluminium-magnesium family (5000 or 5xxx series). As an aluminium-magnesium alloy, it combines moderate-to-high strength with excellent weldability. 5154 aluminium is commonly used in welded structures such as pressure vessels and ships. As a wrought alloy, it can be formed by rolling, extrusion, and forging, but not casting. It can be cold worked to produce tempers with a higher strength but a lower ductility. It is generally not clad.

Alternate names and designations include AlMg3.5, N5, and A95154. The alloy and its various tempers are covered by the following standards:

- ASTM B 209: Standard Specification for Aluminium and Aluminium-Alloy Sheet and Plate
- ASTM B 210: Standard Specification for Aluminium and Aluminium-Alloy Drawn Seamless Tubes
- ASTM B 211: Standard Specification for Aluminium and Aluminium-Alloy Bar, Rod, and Wire
- ASTM B 221: Standard Specification for Aluminium and Aluminium-Alloy Extruded Bars, Rods, Wire, Profiles, and Tubes
- ASTM B 547: Standard Specification for Aluminium and Aluminium-Alloy Formed and Arc-Welded Round Tube
- ISO 6361: Wrought Aluminium and Aluminium Alloy Sheets, Strips and Plates

== Chemical composition ==
The alloy composition of 5154 aluminium is:

- Aluminium: 94.4 to 96.8%
- Chromium: 0.15 to 0.35%
- Copper: 0.1% max
- Iron: 0.4% max
- Magnesium: 3.1 to 3.9%
- Manganese: 0.1%
- Silicon: 0.25% max
- Titanium: 0.2% max
- Zinc: 0.2% max
- Residuals: 0.15% max

The similar alloy A5254 differs only in impurities limits.

== Properties ==
Typical material properties for 5154 aluminium alloy include:

- Density: 2.66 g/cm^{3}, or 166 lb/ft^{3}.
- Young's modulus: 69 GPa, or 10 Msi.
- Electrical conductivity: 32% IACS.
- Ultimate tensile strength: 230 to 330 MPa, or 33 to 48 ksi.
- Thermal Conductivity: 130 W/m-K.
- Thermal Expansion: 23.9 μm/m-K.
