= Lapanga =

- Town
- Location in Odisha, India Lapanga (India)
- Coordinates: 21.73°N 84.02°E
- Country: India
- State: Odisha
- District: Sambalpur

Population (2001)
  - Total: 7,354

Languages
  - Official: Odia
- Time zone: UTC+5:30 (IST)
- Vehicle registration: OD 15
- Website: odisha.gov.in

Lapanga is a census town in Sambalpur district in the Indian state of Odisha.

== Demographics ==
As of 2001 India census, Lapanga had a population of 7,354. Males constitute 54% of the population and females 46%. Lapanga has an average literacy rate of 61%, higher than the national average of 59.5%: male literacy is 70%, and female literacy is 50%. In Lapanga, 16% of the population is under 6 years of age.
