= List of nature centers in Ohio =

This is a list of nature centers and environmental education centers in the state of Ohio.

To use the sortable tables: click on the icons at the top of each column to sort that column in alphabetical order; click again for reverse alphabetical order.

Name	Location	County	Region	Summary
Adell Durbin Park	Stow	Summit	Northeast	website, 34 acres, includes the Harold Welch Nature Center
Aullwood Audubon Center and Farm	Dayton	Montgomery	Southwest	Over 200 acre natural area and educational farm. Operating as an environmental education, sustainable agriculture, and Audubon Center of the National Audubon Society in western Ohio.
Avon Woods Nature Center and Preserve	Cincinnati	Hamilton	Southwest	Owned and operated by the Cincinnati Park Board
Barkcamp State Park	Belmont	Belmont	Southeast	1,005-acre park, nature center offers programs during the summer months
Battelle Darby Creek	Galloway	Franklin	Central	14,000 sq-foot nature center featuring a living stream and interactive exhibits, 7,060-acre park, operated by Columbus Metroparks
Beaver Creek State Park	East Liverpool	Columbiana	Northeast	2,722-acre park, includes the Pioneer Village and the Beaver Creek Wildlife Education Center with small live animals, natural history dioramas, displays of insects, arrowheads and nature photography
Beech Creek Gardens	Alliance	Stark	Northeast	website, a sensory garden for the visually and non-visually impaired is provided and maintained at this location.
Blacklick Woods	Reynoldsburg	Franklin	Central	643-acre park with nature center, operated by Columbus Metroparks
Blendon Woods	Westerville	Franklin	Central	653 acres, nature center, operated by Columbus Metroparks
Brecksville Nature Center	Brecksville	Cuyahoga	Northeast	website, operated by Cleveland Metroparks in 3,494-acre Brecksville Reservation
Brown Family Environmental Center	Gambier	Knox	Central	website, part of Kenyon College, about 380 acres, gardens, outdoor recreation, programs
Brukner Nature Center	Troy	Miami	Southwest	website, 165 acres, hands-on exhibits, live native animals, art exhibits, wildlife rehabilitation
Huston-Brumbaugh Nature Center	Alliance	Stark	Northeast	website, operated by University of Mount Union, displays on natural history, bird observatory, trails
Caesar Creek State Park	Waynesville	Warren	Southwest	Includes pioneer village of over 15 log cabins and other structures and the Caesar Creek Nature Center
Caldwell Preserve	Cincinnati	Hamilton	Southwest	website, nature center, operated by the Cincinnati Park Board in Carthage, Cincinnati
California Woods Nature Preserve	Cincinnati	Hamilton	Southwest	website, nature center, 113 acres, operated by the Cincinnati Park Board
CanalWay Center	Cuyahoga Heights	Cuyahoga	Northeast	website, operated by Cleveland Metroparks in 306-acre Ohio & Erie Canal Reservation, live small animals, exhibits on nature, industry and the canal
Children's Schoolhouse Nature Park	Kirtland	Lake	Northeast	website, operated by Lake Metroparks, open for programs or by appointment
Cincinnati Nature Center	Milford	Clermont	Southwest	Protects over 1,600 acres in two locations
Dawes Arboretum	Newark	Licking	Central	Over 1,800 acres, 8 miles of hiking trails and a four-mile auto tour, Discovery Center, education programs
Deer Creek State Park (Ohio)	Mt. Sterling	Madison	Southwest	website, 2,337-acre resort park, nature center offers nature programs during the summer months
Dillon State Park	Nashport	Muskingum	Southeast	website, 3,845 acres, programs offered in the summer
Donald W. Meyer Center at Big Creek Park	Chardon	Geauga	Northeast	website, operated by the County, 642-acre park
Farbach-Werner Nature Preserve	Colerain	Hamilton	Southwest	website, operated by the Hamilton County Park District, 22 acres, paved trail, gardens, Ellenwood Nature barn for programs and a gift shop
Ford Nature Center	Youngstown	Mahoning	Northeast	Located in Mill Creek Park, displays of plants and animals of four local habitats, live animals, discovery room
French Creek Nature & Arts Center	Sheffield Village	Lorain	Northeast	website, operated by Lorain County Metro Parks, nature programs and exhibits, wildlife observation area, indoor playground
Glen Helen Outdoor Education Center	Yellow Springs	Greene	Southwest	Operated by Antioch College in 1,000-acre Glen Helen Nature Preserve
Grand Lake St. Marys State Park	St. Marys	Auglaize	Northwest	Programs offered in the summer, 591-acre park
Grange Insurance Audubon Center	Columbus	Franklin	Central	website, operated by Audubon Ohio, located within the 120-acre Scioto Audubon Metro Park on the Scioto River
Harrison Lake State Park	Wauseon	Fulton	Northwest	147 acres with 105-acre lake, camping and trails
Highbanks Nature Center	Lewis Center	Delaware	Central	website, 1,159 acres, operated by Columbus Metroparks
Hocking Woods Nature Center	Nelsonville	Athens	Southeast	website, part of Hocking College, features an interpretive building, wildlife habitats, ponds, walkways, feed stations and seasonal programming
Hueston Woods State Park	College Corner	Preble	Southwest	625-acre Acton Lake
Imago Earth Center	Cincinnati	Hamilton	Southwest	website, located in Price Hill, Cincinnati, 16 acre urban nature preserve and education facility at the Earth Center
Indian Lake State Park (Ohio)	Lakeview	Logan	Northwest	website, programs in the summer, 800-acre multi-use park
Kiser Lake State Park	St. Paris	Champaign	Southwest	website, 531 acres with 396-acre lake, nature center
La Boiteaux Woods	Cincinnati	Hamilton	Southwest	website, nature center, operated by the Cincinnati Park Board, over 2 miles of trails, nature displays, animal mounts, live animals
Lake Alma State Park	Wellston	Jackson	Southeast	website, 292-acre park, nature programs in the summer
Lake Erie Nature & Science Center	Bay Village	Cuyahoga	Northeast	website, indoor and outdoor live animal displays, planetarium, wildlife rehabilitation, located in 103-acre Huntington Reservation
Lake Erie Islands Nature & Wildlife Center	Put-in-Bay	Ottawa	Northwest	website Indoor and outdoor turtle ponds, live reptiles & amphibians, observation beehive, bird watching window, geology display including animation on how the Lake Erie Islands were formed, large taxidermy wildlife collection of North American wildlife with interactive displays. Free programs every Tuesday in the summer
Lake Hope State Park	McArthur	Vinton	Southeast	2,983-acre park, includes a nature center
Lake Loramie State Park	Minster	Shelby	Southwest	Programs offered year round, 407 acres
Lowe-Volk Park Nature Center	Crestline	Crawford	Northwest	website, operated by Crawford Park District, interpretive displays, discovery area, live animals
Maumee Bay State Park	Oregon	Lucas	Northwest	1,336 acres, Trautman Nature Center open year round, features interactive displays, an auditorium, research laboratory and viewing windows
Mentor Marsh State Nature Preserve	Mentor	Lake	Northeast	website, nature center, 673-acre preserve, features the Carol H. Sweet Mentor Marsh Nature Center, operated by the Cleveland Museum of Natural History
Metzger Nature Center	Stone Creek	Tuscarawas	Northeast	website, operated by Ohio Northern University, 70-acre field station for the biological sciences
Miami Whitewater Forest	Cincinnati	Hamilton	Southwest	4,345 acres, operated by the Hamilton County Park District, visitor center features nature displays and a gift shop
Narrows Reserve & Nature Center	Xenia	Greene	Southwest	website, operated by Greene County Parks, 162 acres, features native plant and animal exhibits, raptor aviary and an apiary
Nature Center at Shaker Lakes	Shaker Heights	Cuyahoga	Northeast	20 acres
Norma Johnson Center	Dover	Tuscarawas	Northeast	website, 303-acre preserve, picnic shelter, over 6 miles of trails, environmental education programs
North Chagrin Nature Center	Mayfield Village	Cuyahoga	Northeast	website, operated by Cleveland Metroparks in North Chagrin Reservation, features educational displays, resource library, auditorium and nature shop
Paint Creek State Park	Bainbridge	Ross	Southwest	5,652-acre park, nature center programs offered in the summer
Penitentiary Glen Reservation and Nature Center	Kirtland	Lake	Northeast	website, operated by Lake Metroparks, 424 acres, over 7.5 miles of hiking trails, interactive Nature Calls exhibit, wildlife center with native animal ambassadors
Pike Lake State Park (Ohio)	Bainbridge	Ross	Southwest	13 acres, programs offered in the summer
Pymatuning State Park (Ohio)	Andover	Ashtabula	Northeast	3,512 acres, programs offered in the summer
Quail Hollow State Park	Hartville	Stark	Northeast	703 acres, Carriage House Nature Center open on weekends from May through October
Rocky Fork State Park	Hillsboro	Highland	Southwest	2,080-acre lake, nature programs offered in the summer at the campgrounds
Rocky River Nature Center	North Olmsted	Cuyahoga	Northeast	website, operated by Cleveland Metroparks, over 5 miles of trails along the river, nature exhibits, aquariums
Rotary Nature Center	Bowling Green	Wood	Northwest	website, operated by the city in 100-acre Wintergarden/St. John’s Nature Preserve
Salt Fork State Park	Lore City	Guernsey	Southeast	Nature center programs offered in the summer, 17,229 acres of land and 2,952 acres of water
Sharon Woods Centre	Sharonville	Hamilton	Southwest	website, 730 acres, operated by the Hamilton County Park District, features educational nature displays and Adventure Station indoor play area
Shawnee Prairie Preserve and Nature Center	Greenville	Darke	Southwest	website, 118 acres, operated by the County
Shawnee State Park	Portsmouth	Scioto	Southwest	1,095 acres, nature center open from Memorial Day through Labor Day, live animals
Trailside Nature Center in Burnet Woods	Cincinnati	Hamilton	Southwest	website, nature center, 90 acres, nature library, crafts room, meeting space, exhibits and the Wolff Planetarium, operated by the Cincinnati Park Board
Twin Valley Welcome Center	Germantown	Montgomery	Southwest	website, operated by Five Rivers MetroParks, 1,665-acre Germantown Park
Van Buren State Park	Van Buren	Hancock	Northwest	Programs offered in the summer
Watershed Stewardship Center	Parma	Cuyahoga	Northeast	website, operated by Cleveland Metroparks in 324-acre West Creek Reservation, citizen science education programs
The West Woods	Novelty	Geauga	Northeast	website, 902-acre park, nature center open daily, hands-on exhibits about the geology and hydrology of Geauga County
Wilderness Center	Wilmot	Stark	Northeast	619-acre main site with 10 miles of trails, interpretive building, astronomy education building, an observation tower, pier and picnic shelters
William C. Kraner Nature Center	Newark	Licking	Central	operated by Ohio Nature Education, educational displays about Licking County cultural and natural history
Winton Centre at Winton Wood	Springfield Township	Hamilton	Southwest	website, 2,555 acres, operated by the Hamilton County Park District, displays on pond life, animal characteristics and the water cycle
Woodland Mound	Anderson Township	Hamilton	Southwest	website, 1,066 acres, operated by the Hamilton County Park District, includes the Seasongood Nature Center with nature exhibits, outdoor observation deck and wild bird viewing area
