= Education in Ohio =

Education in Ohio is provided by both public and private schools, colleges, and universities. Ohio's system of public education is outlined in Article VI of the state constitution, and in Title XXXIII of the Ohio Revised Code. Ohio University, the first university in the Northwest Territory, was also the first public institution in Ohio. Substantively, Ohio's system is similar to those found in other states. At the State level, the Ohio Department of Education, which is overseen by the Ohio State Board of Education, governs primary and secondary educational institutions. At the municipal level, there are approximately 700 school districts statewide. The Ohio Board of Regents coordinates and assists with Ohio's institutions of higher education which have recently been reorganized into the University System of Ohio under Governor Strickland. The system averages an annual enrollment of more than 400,000 students, making it one of the five largest state university systems in the U.S.

== History ==
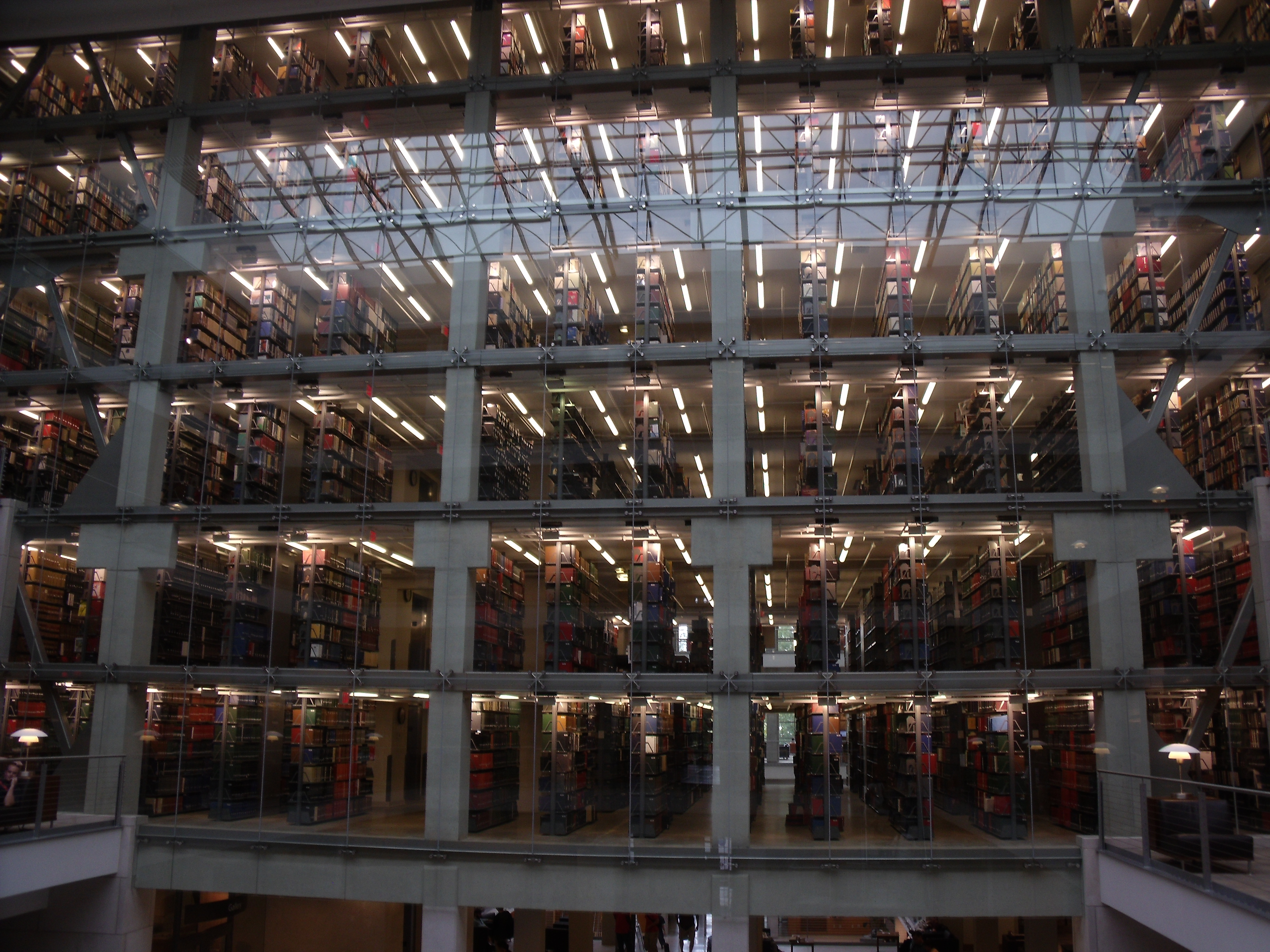
William Oxley Thompson Memorial Library on the campus of the Ohio State University, an anchor of the University System of Ohio, the nation's largest comprehensive public system of higher education

Education has been an integral part of Ohio culture since its early days of statehood. In the beginning, mothers usually educated their children at home or paid for their children to attend smaller schools in villages and towns. Early on, the US was interested in creating a national public schooling system, but the irony came to be that, in Ohio, the various religious groups who had settled here refused to allow one another any say in what their own children would be taught, causing the issue to be constantly put on hold. In 1821 the state passed a tax to finance local schools. In 1822, Caleb Atwater lobbied the legislature and Governor Allen Trimble to establish a commission to study the possibility of initiating public, common schools. Atwater modeled his plan after the New York City public school system. After public opinion in 1824 forced the state to find a resolution to the education problem, the legislature established the common school system in 1825 and financed it with a half-million property levy.

They ultimately chose to relax state authority over school curriculum and gave Ohio schools regional authority over the matter. It would remain as such until the 20th century, but has caused a fairly erratic, confusing and sometimes lacking schooling experience in some subjects, even if generally adequate to get by.

School districts formed, and by 1838 the first direct tax was levied allowing access to school for all. The first appropriation for the common schools came in 1838, a sum of $200,000. The average salary for male teachers in some districts during this early period was $25/month and $12.50/month for females. By 1915, the appropriations for the common schools totaled over $28 million. The first middle school in the nation, Indianola Junior High School (now the Graham Expeditionary Middle School), opened in Columbus in 1909. McGuffey Readers was a leading textbook originating from the state and found throughout the nation.

The first dental school in the United States was founded in the early 19th century in Bainbridge. The Ohio School for the Blind became the first of its kind in the country, located in Columbus.

After 2000, Ohio State government began experimentally exerting more control over schools, as they attempted to help the state's education system evolve with the times. As of 2020, it largely seems to have done just as much harm as good and re-exposed a lot of the issues inherent in how Ohio schooling was originally organized, which they are now desperately trying to solve.

== Higher education ==
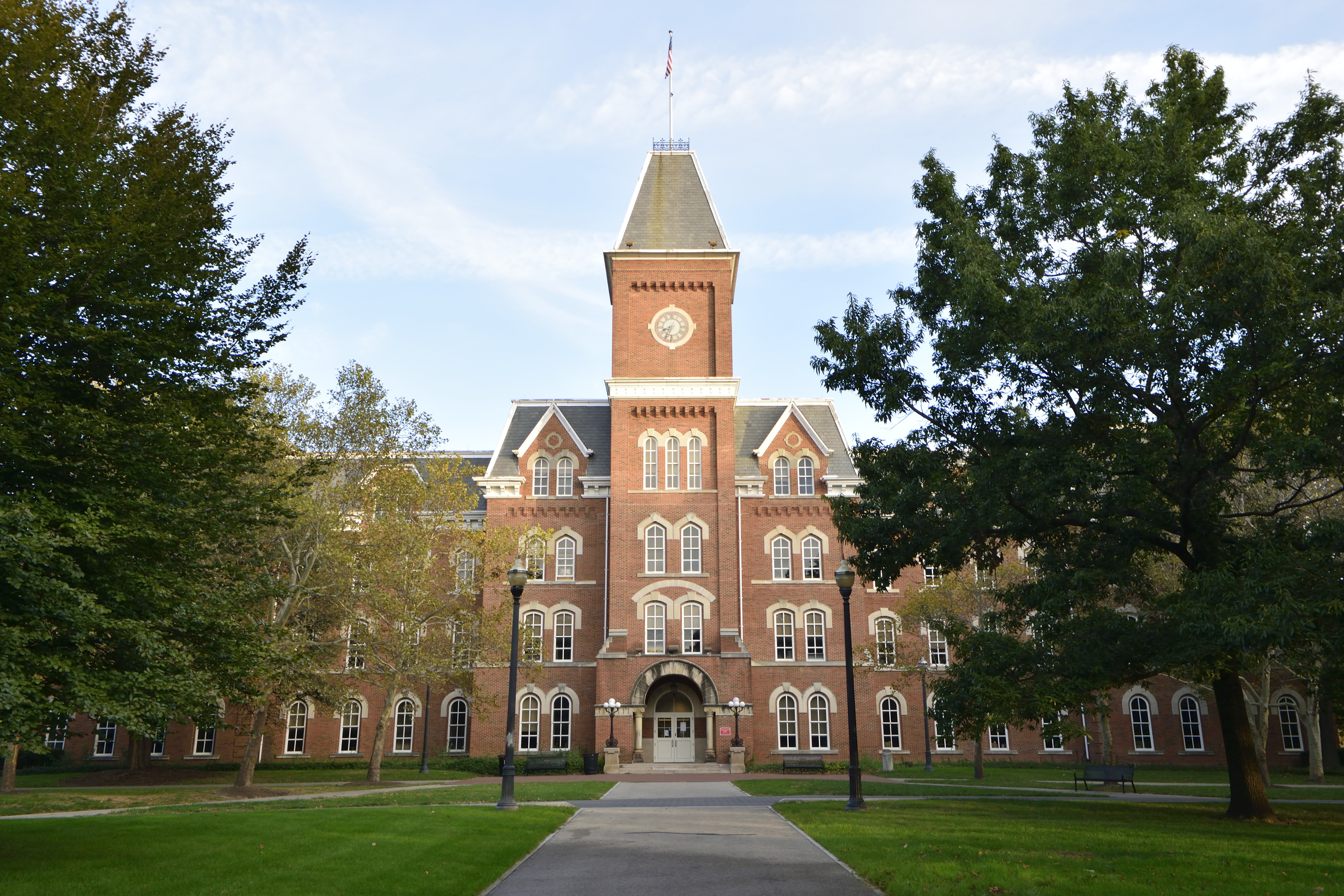
University Hall at the Ohio State University in Columbus, Ohio's largest university by enrollment

In the 19th century Ohio was energetic in the creation of new institutions of higher education. It soon had more than England. In the 21st century Ohio institutions consistently ranking in the top 50 nationally of the U.S. News & World Report of liberal arts colleges are Ohio Big Three; Denison University, Oberlin College, and Kenyon College. Ranking in the top 100 of national research universities typically includes Case Western Reserve University, Ohio State University and Miami University.

=== Organizing the University System of Ohio ===
The University System of Ohio is the nation's largest comprehensive public system of higher education. The University System of Ohio was unified under Governor Ted Strickland in 2007. In 2008, Chancellor Eric Fingerhut proposed creating common academic calendars for all of the system's universities: the goal was to simplify transfer between institutions and allow students to be recruited at the same time for jobs and internships. After spending more than $26 million starting in 2008, the transition was completed by the 2012 academic year.

=== Institutions ===
- 13 state universities
  - Bowling Green State University (Bowling Green)
  - Central State University (Wilberforce)
  - Cleveland State University (Cleveland)
  - Kent State University (Kent)
  - Miami University (Oxford)
  - Ohio State University, (Columbus)
  - Ohio University (Athens)
  - Shawnee State University (Portsmouth)
  - University of Akron (Akron)
  - University of Cincinnati (Cincinnati)
  - University of Toledo (Toledo)
  - Wright State University (Dayton)
  - Youngstown State University (Youngstown)
- 24 state university branch and regional campuses

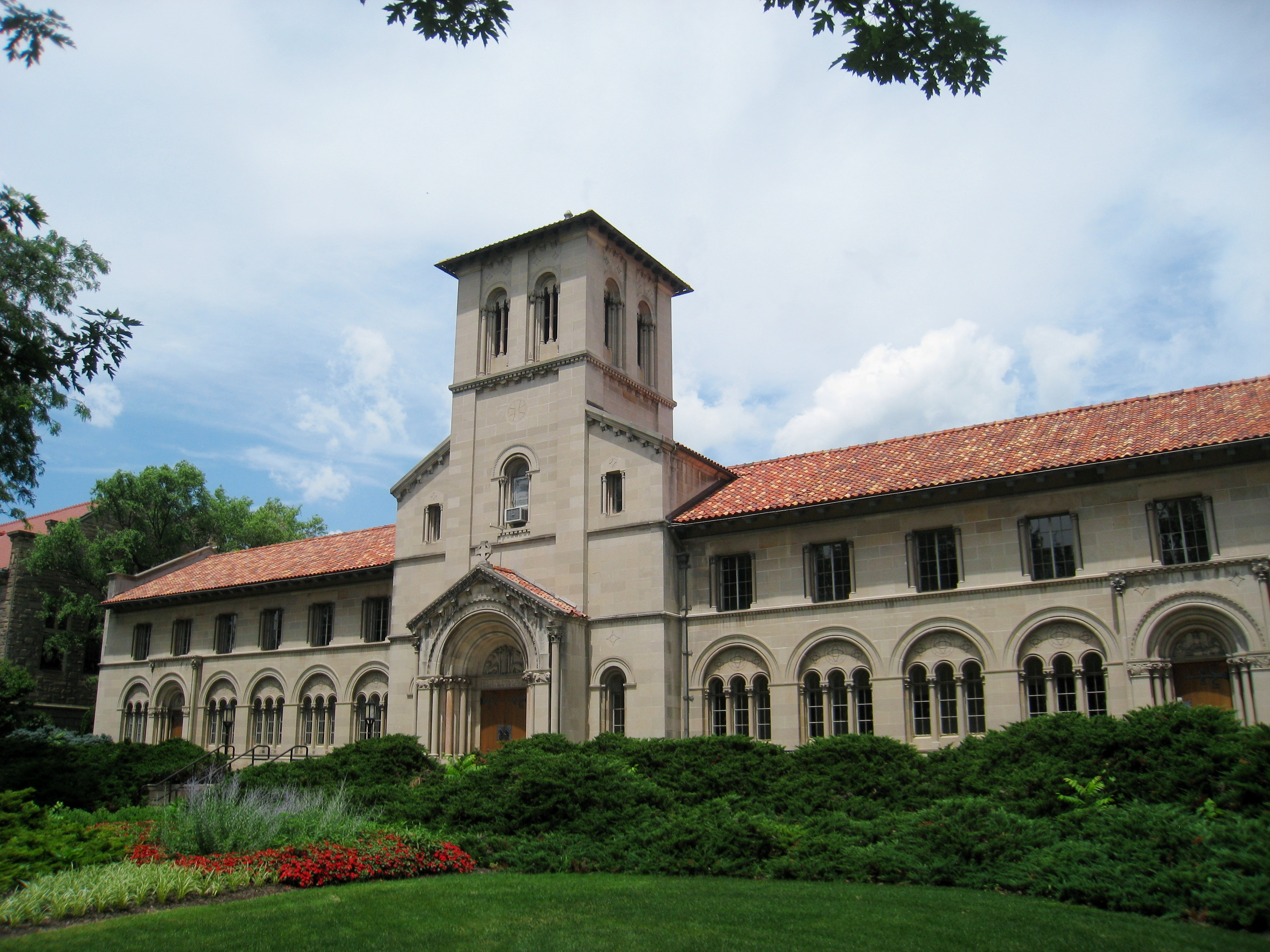
Bosworth Hall at Oberlin College in northeast Ohio, the first college in the U.S. to admit women

- 46 private colleges and universities
- 6 free-standing state-assisted medical schools
  - Boonshoft School of Medicine, Wright State University
  - Heritage College of Osteopathic Medicine, Ohio University
  - Northeast Ohio Medical University
  - The Ohio State University College of Medicine and Public Health
  - University of Cincinnati College of Medicine
  - University of Toledo College of Medicine (formerly Medical University of Ohio)
- 15 community colleges
- 8 technical colleges
- 24 independent non-profit colleges

== See also ==
- Bing Act
- List of high schools in Ohio
- list of school districts in Ohio
- Ohio
