= ASM Headquarters and Geodesic Dome =

- U.S. National Register of Historic Places
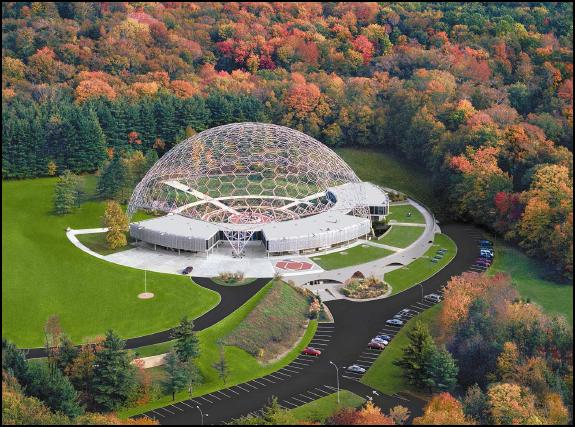

- Location within Ohio Location within the United States
- Location: 9639 Kinsman Rd., Materials Park, Ohio 44073 Russell Township, Geauga County, Ohio
- Coordinates: 41°27′36.37″N 81°17′56.23″W
- Area: 45 acres (18 ha)
- Architect: John Terrence Kelly, [Synergetics, Inc.]
- NRHP reference No.: 09000849
- Added to NRHP: October 22, 2009

The ASM International Headquarters and Geodesic Dome, at the Materials Park campus in Russell Township, Geauga County, Ohio, United States, are the headquarters of ASM International, a professional organization for materials scientists and engineers. These modernist structures were built in 1958 and dedicated in September 1959.

== Purpose ==
The campus serves as the headquarters of ASM International, formerly the American Society for Metals. The dome is the "world's largest open air geodesic dome", and is rare among Synergetics, Inc.-designed geodesic domes in that it was never intended to be a covered structure.

== Design ==
Originally serving as headquarters for the American Society for Metals in September 1959, the geodesic dome was built on a 100-acre parcel donated by William Hunt Eisenman (1886–1958), a charter member of the American Society of Metals and its secretary for nearly four decades.^{[3][4]} In 1961, ASM purchased William Hunt Eisenman's Sunnimoor Farm and 400-acres of land adjacent to the ASM campus.^{[2]}

The complex was designed by John Terrence Kelly, a native of Elyria, Ohio.^{[5]} There are differing opinions on R. Buckminster Fuller's role in the design of ASM's dome. While Fuller was a founding partner of Synergetics, Inc. and a patent holder for geodesic dome geometry, he was divested of all interest in Synergetics, Inc. before this dome was conceived. The geodesic dome was designed by Thomas C. Howard, the owner of Synergetics, Inc., in Raleigh, North Carolina. Thomas C. Howard designed many other geodesic domes, such as Climatron Conservatory at Missouri Botanical Gardens, the Union Tank Car Company dome (now demolished) in Baton Rouge, LA, and Poliedro de Caracas in Venezuela.^{[6]} Fuller's role was limited to licensing the use of his patent.

In a 2010 essay, Stan Theobald, retired ASM managing director (2002-2012), recalls that the dome engineers were from the College of Engineering at the North Carolina State University stating, "since they were the only Engineers that Bucky [Fuller] used." ^{[7]} Throughout his 32-page essay, Theobald refers to the "dome Engineers," speaking very little of any involvement by Fuller, which would seem to indicate that Kelly used Fuller's principles, while other engineers made them work for this unique open-air, above grade project. Theobald elaborated on the spring 1958 groundbreaking and formal announcement dinner that followed at the Union Club in Cleveland, Ohio where Fuller was the guest speaker. Theobald describes Fuller's presentation as "a marathon, rambling dissertation" in which he proposed "that the most important advances on the future would be invisible." In his essay, Theobald compares Fuller's vision from 1958 to reality in 2010, an era of the Internet, DNA, genome mapping, and nano technology.^{[7]}

The geodesic dome is actually a triacon truss rising to a height of 103 feet and is 274 feet in diameter.^{[2][8][9]} The dome is built using approximately 65,000 parts, including 13 miles of extruded aluminum tubing and tension rods bolted into hexagons. There are no internal supports and the entire 80-ton weight rests on five concrete-filled pylons driven up to 77 feet into the earth.^{[2][3][9][10]}

The entire complex sits on a 400-foot diameter piazza with a 100-foot diameter mineral garden in the center that contains 66 labeled specimens of mineral ores with a fountain in the center.^{[2][9]} The 50,000-square foot headquarter building is a three-story semi-circular shaped concrete structure that occupies two-fifths of the piazza perimeter. The building resides on the western perimeter and is independent of the dome structure and has three distinct sections.^{[2]}

The building has floor-to-ceiling aluminum frame windows inside poured concrete walls and floors. The exterior of the western-facing second level glass wall is protected by a 13-foot high, 390-foot long satin-finish stainless steel "sun shield," which protects against the afternoon sun without obstructing the view by providing 4,000 one-foot by five-inch louvers.^{[10]} Stainless steel, bronze, copper, aluminum, titanium and tungsten elements are incorporated into the interior design.^{[2]}

The original investment for the building and landscaping was $2.4 million.^{[10]} The semi-circular building, capped by a geodesic dome, symbolizes humanity’s mastery of metals and materials.

== Construction ==
Construction began in March 1958 by general contractor Gillmore-Olson Company, under the supervision of George McKay. Aluminum was supplied by Kaiser Aluminum & Chemical Co. of Halethorpe, Maryland. The dome was fabricated by North American Aviation Corporation of Columbus, and the Mak Construction Company of Cleveland erected the dome.

== Awards ==
For his architectural work including the design of the ASM headquarters, John Terrence Kelly was awarded the 1968 Cleveland Arts Prize for Architecture.

The complex was listed on the National Register of Historic Places on October 22, 2009. The listing was announced as the featured listing in the National Park Service's weekly list of October 30, 2009.

== Renovations ==
In 1995, ASM International sold more than 500 acres (200 ha), including over half of the original donated parcel, to the Geauga Park District, which represents a sizable portion of the 902-acre (365 ha) West Woods park. The ASM International campus resides on the remaining 45 acres (18 ha) of land split into two parcels. One 41.05-acre (16.61 ha) parcel is in Russell Township, and the other 3.95-acre (1.60 ha) parcel is in Newbury Township.

The mineral garden was redesigned in 1999 to improve the walkways, irrigation and drainage. A variety of perennials and trees were added, including a Malus apple tree directly descended from the tree that inspired Sir Isaac Newton's theory of gravitation. The tree was donated to ASM by the National Bureau of Standards in 1968. A 16-foot-high (4.9 m) fountain sculpture entitled "ASM Singularity," made from copper, titanium, and stainless steel created by Eric Orr was added as well. On the cover of ASM International's 1999 annual report it states: "In mathematical terms, singularity is the point of a curve at which dramatic changes take place."

In 1999, a granite memorial dedicated to William H. Eisenman was placed on the eastern hillside. It is engraved with the inscription credited to Daniel Hudson Burnham, famous for the Burnham Plan or "The Plan of Chicago," a comprehensive turn-of-the-century plan for the future of Chicago. The inscription reads, "Make no little plans: they have no magic to stir one's blood. Make big plans; aim high in hope and work, remembering that a noble, logical diagram once recorded will never die."

In 2010, the headquarters underwent renovations and restorations led by the Chesler Group of Cleveland and Dimit Architects of Lakewood, Ohio. The total cost of renovations were nearly $6 million, including over $2 million from state and federal historic-preservation tax credits. The historic preservation funding came as a tradeoff against strict requirements of the National Park Service, the administrative arm of the National Register of Historic Places, which requires renovated historic buildings retain their original architectural character and critical original materials. Interior and exterior renovations included new mechanical, electrical, and plumbing systems, ADA-accessible restrooms, interior updates, restoration of the glass window wall and the exterior stainless steel sunscreens, and repairs to the concrete structure under the roof.

A 1953-commissioned seven-panel brushed aluminum mural created by metals artist Nikos Bel-Jon called the “History of Iron”, once used at ASM trade shows, now hangs throughout the headquarters building.
