= Costas Galiotis =

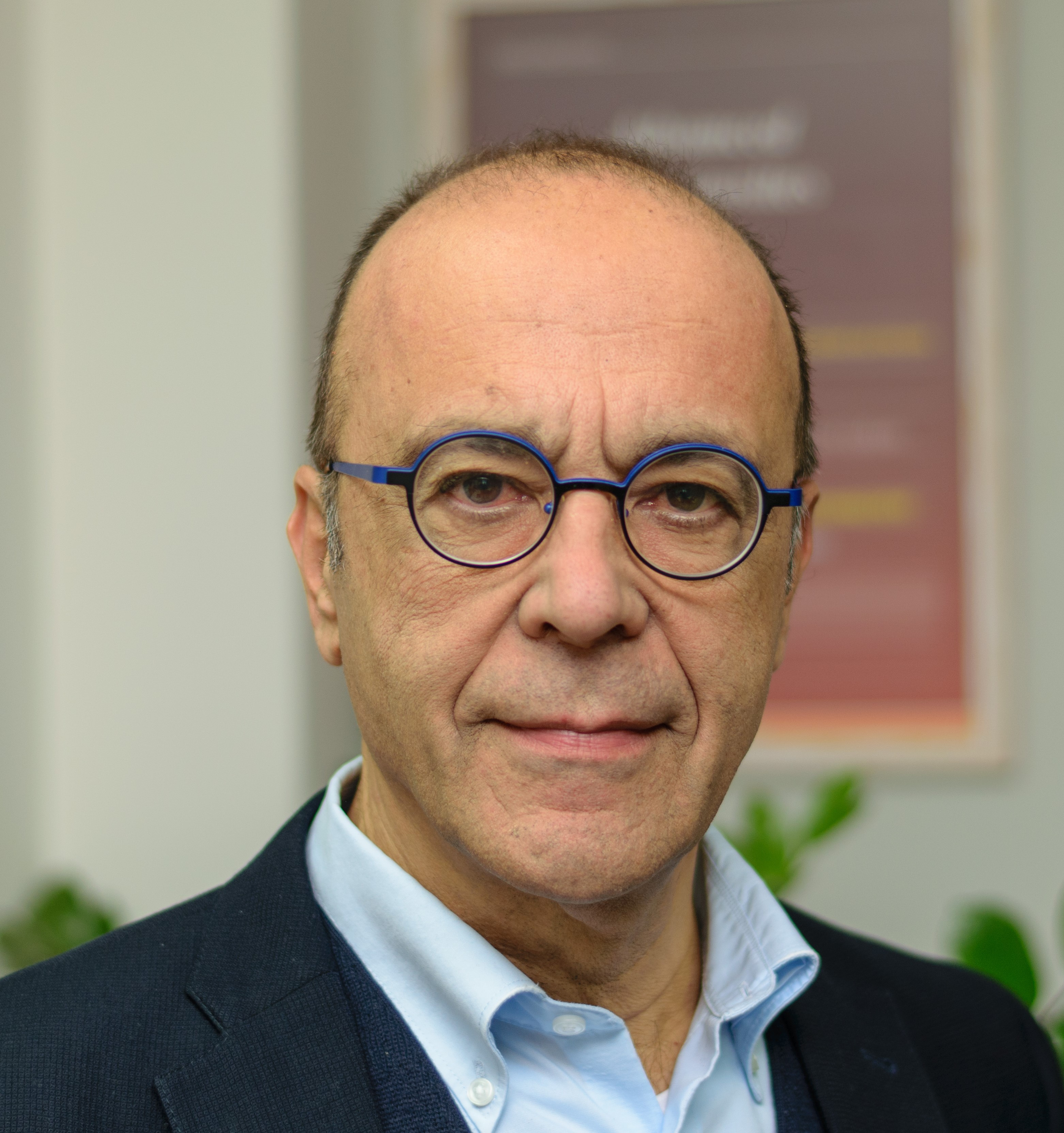
- Born: Constantine (Costas) Galiotis
- Citizenship: Greece
- Education: University of London; University of Athens
- Known for: Raman spectroscopy in composites Graphene mechanics Nanotechnology in Cultural Heritage
- Awards: Member of Academia Europaea
- Scientific career
- Fields: Materials Science, Chemical Engineering, Nanotechnology
- Workplaces: University of Patras; FORTH

Costas Galiotis is a Greek materials scientist who is a professor emeritus in the Department of Chemical Engineering at the University of Patras. He is also a Collaborating Faculty Member at the Institute of Chemical Engineering Sciences (ICE-HT) of the Foundation for Research & Technology – Hellas (FORTH). His research focuses on the physical and mechanical properties of 2D materials, graphene, and carbon nanotubes, as well as the application of Raman spectroscopy to stress and strain measurements in composite materials.

== Education ==
Galiotis completed his Bachelor of Science (BSc) in Chemistry at the University of Athens in 1977. He went on to earn a Doctor of Philosophy (PhD) in Materials Science from the University of London in 1981.

== Academic career ==
Galiotis began his academic career in the United Kingdom, first as a Research Assistant and later as a tenured Lecturer and Reader in Materials Science at Queen Mary University of London (1981–1997). He also held a tenure-track Lectureship at Brunel University in 1986.

In 1996, he became a Research Director at the Institute of Chemical Engineering Sciences of Foundation for Research & Technology – Hellas (FORTH). He later joined the University of Patras, serving as a Professor in the Department of Materials Science from 2002 to 2014 and then in the Department of Chemical Engineering from 2014 to 2022. From 2007 to 2013, Galiotis was elected as the Director of the Institute of Chemical Engineering Sciences (ICE-HT) and a member of the Board of Directors of FORTH. He became Professor Emeritus at the University of Patras in 2022.

Galiotis has held positions as Editor-in-Chief of Advanced Composites Letters (1993–2018), Editor-in-Chief of Nanostructured Polymers and Nanocomposites (2005–2014), Editor-in-Chief of Graphene and 2D Materials (Springer-Nature, 2017–present), and Editorial Board Member for Scientific Reports, International Materials Reviews, and Applied Sciences.

Galiotis founded the FORTH Graphene Centre in 2011 and served as the President of the European Association of Composite Materials from 2004 to 2006. From 2017 to 2023, he was on the Scientific Council of the Greek Foundation for Research and Innovation (HFRI) as the director of its Physical Sciences.

== Research ==
Galiotis has carried out research in several areas of materials science, including graphene, carbon nanotubes, polymer composites and micromechanics. His earlier work concerns the study of polymer morphology and structure–property relationships in single-crystal (polydiacetylene) and semi-crystalline polymers, as well as the use of spectroscopic techniques for non-destructive evaluation of materials.

His more recent work covers the chemical vapour deposition (CVD) growth of graphene and other two-dimensional materials, surface modification, structural characterisation and the mechanical response of these materials under tensile and compressive loading. He has also investigated the production and behaviour of graphene- and carbon-nanotube-based nanocomposites, addressing stress transfer, interfacial properties and failure mechanisms.

He is known for pioneering the use of Raman spectroscopy for in situ stress and strain measurements in fibres and composite materials. His contributions include the first quantification of interfacial shear stress and failure processes in composites, the development of a modular remote Raman microscope, and early experimental studies on the mechanical deformation of monolayer graphene. His group has also examined wrinkling phenomena in two-dimensional materials, the mechanics of graphene at large deformations, and graphene systems exhibiting superlubricity at the millimetre scale.

More recent work includes operando Raman and optical monitoring of graphene growth on liquid-metal catalysts, the development of graphene/polymer nanolaminates for electromagnetic interference shielding, and the use of CVD-grown graphene veils for the protection of artworks from environmental degradation for which he holds a number of patents.

== Honors and awards ==
- 2019 - Fellow of the European Academy of Sciences (EuRASc)
- 2019 - The Aristeion of the Academy of Athens in Natural Sciences.
- 2020 - Fellow of the Institute of Materials, Minerals and Mining (IOM3)
- 2021 - Elected Member of the Academia Europaea
- 2023 - International Graphene Innovation Award (IGA) for the protection of artworks using 2D materials
- 2023 - "Panagiotis Kanellopoulos" Excellent Publication Award from the University of Patras
- 2025 - Springer Nature Distinction Award for editorial work
