= ASM International (society) =

Professional society

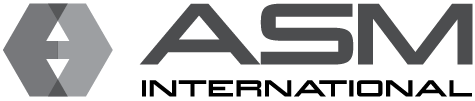
- Founded: October 4, 1913
- Founder: William Park Woodside
- Type: Professional Organization
- Purpose: Metals, polymers, ceramics
- Location: ASM Headquarters and Geodesic Dome, Materials Park campus, Russell Township, Geauga County, Ohio
- Region served: Worldwide
- Method: Membership, professional development, conferences, publications, local chapters
- Members: 20,000+
- Key people: ASM Board of Trustees
- Employees: 50-100
- Website: www.asminternational.org

ASM International, formerly known as the American Society for Metals, is an association of materials-centric engineers and scientists.

As the charitable arm of ASM, the ASM Materials Education Foundation also operates ASM Materials Camp in the summers for high school students and teachers. These camps are intended to educate the public about the materials field, and encourage young people to pursue careers in materials science and engineering.

== History ==
ASM has been in existence, under various names, since 1913, when it began as a local club in Detroit called the Steel Treaters Club. During World War I, the Steel Treaters Club became the Steel Treating Research Society, with groups in Detroit, Chicago, and Cleveland. After World War I, the Chicago group seceded and formed the American Steel Treaters Society.

In 1920 the local chapters were reunified into the new American Society for Steel Treating (ASST). The society expanded its technical scope beyond steel during the 1920s. In 1933 it became the American Society for Metals (ASM).

Gradually the society expanded its geographic scope beyond the U.S. and its technical scope beyond metals to include other materials. It became known as ASM International in 1986. As of 2021, ASM claims 20,000 members worldwide.

ASM provides several information resources, including technical journals, books, and databases. ASM also hosts numerous international conferences each year, including ASM's Annual Meeting: International Materials, Applications, and Technologies Conference and Exposition (IMAT).

== Affiliate Societies ==
Six affiliate societies focused on specific areas of materials science also fall under the ASM umbrella:

- The Heat Treating Society (HTS),
- The Thermal Spray Society (TSS),
- The International Metallographic Society (IMS),
- The Electronic Device Failure Analysis Society (EDFAS),
- The Failure Analysis Society (FAS), and
- The International Organization on Shape Memory and Superelastic Technology (SMST).

Each society is led by volunteers, produces specific technical content for members, and holds its own international event.

== Journals ==
Technical journals published on behalf of ASM include:

- Alloy Digest
- International Materials Reviews (IMR)
- Journal of Failure Analysis & Prevention (JFAP)
- Journal of Materials Engineering and Performance (JMEP)
- Journal of Phase Equilibria and Diffusion (JPED)
- Journal of Thermal Spray Technology (JTST)
- Metallography, Microstructure, and Analysis (MMA)
- Metallurgical and Materials Transactions A and B (MetTransA & MetTransB)
- Shape Memory and Superelasticity.

== See also ==
- ASM Headquarters and Geodesic Dome
