= Journal of Materials Engineering and Performance =

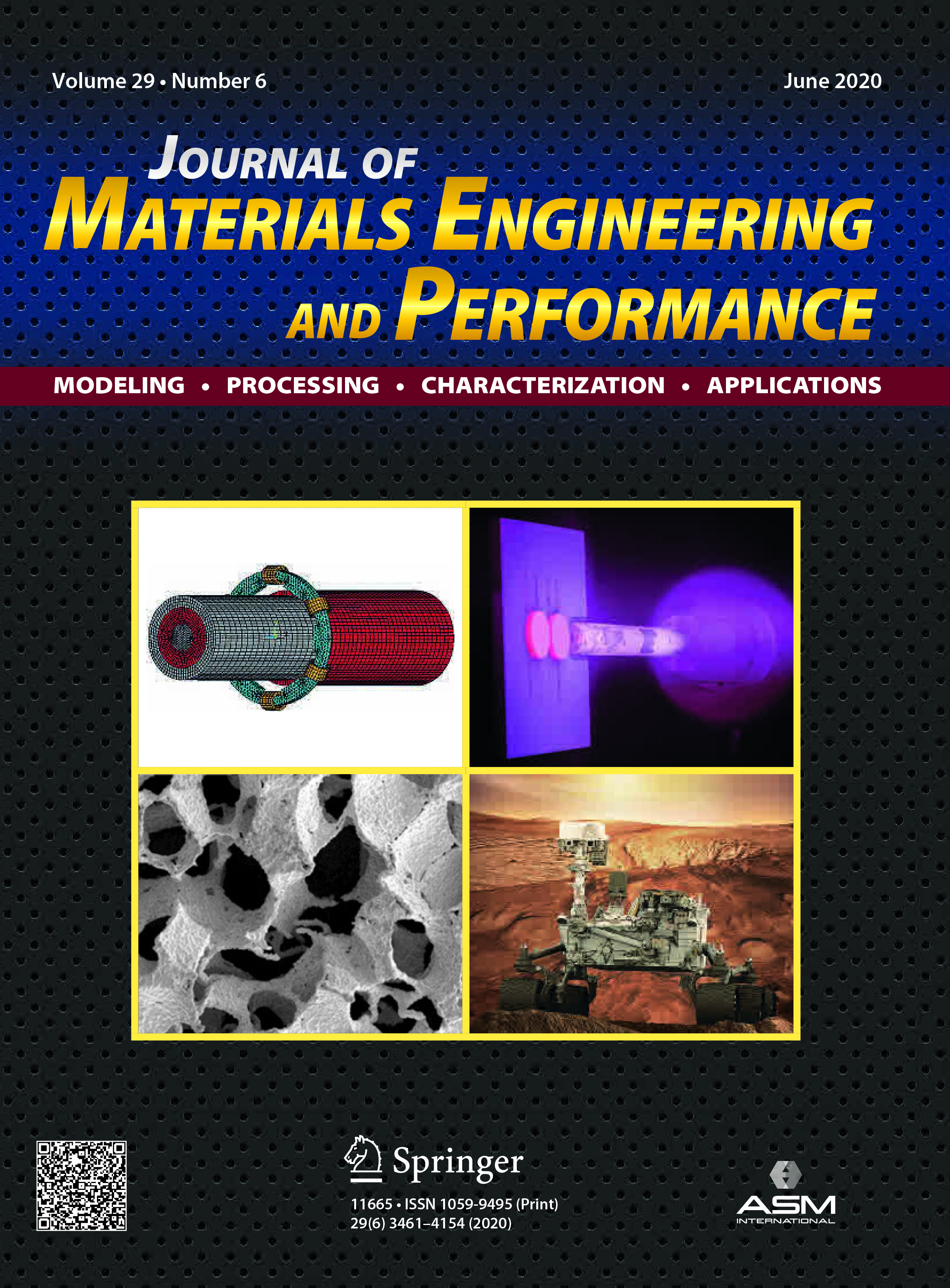
- Discipline: Materials science
- Language: English
- Edited by: R. Asthana

Publication details
- Former names: Journal of Materials Shaping Technology, Journal of Heat Treating, Journal of Materials Engineering
- History: 1992-present
- Publisher: Springer Science+Business Media on behalf of ASM International
- Frequency: Monthly
- Impact factor: 2.0 (2024)

Standard abbreviations
- ISO 4: J. Mater. Eng. Perform.

Indexing
- CODEN: JMEPEG
- ISSN: 1059-9495 (print); 1544-1024 (web)
- LCCN: 92644065
- OCLC no.: 757276771

Links
- Journal homepage; Online access; Journal page at ASM international

The Journal of Materials Engineering and Performance is a monthly peer-reviewed scientific journal published by Springer Science+Business Media on behalf of ASM International. The editor-in-chief is Rajiv Asthana (University of Wisconsin). The journal covers all aspects of materials engineering broadly described as materials selection, design, processing, characterization, and evaluation. The scope includes all substances used in engineering applications with a tendency toward constituent materials that comprise a larger system.

== Abstracting and indexing ==
This journal is abstracted and indexed by:

- Current Contents/Engineering, Computing and Technology
- Science Citation Index Expanded
- Materials Science Citation Index
- Chemical Abstracts Service
- Earthquake Engineering Abstracts
- Scopus
- INSPEC
- Astrophysics Data System
- VINITI Database RAS

According to the Journal itself, the journal has a 2024 impact factor of 2.0.
