= Journal of Thermal Spray Technology =

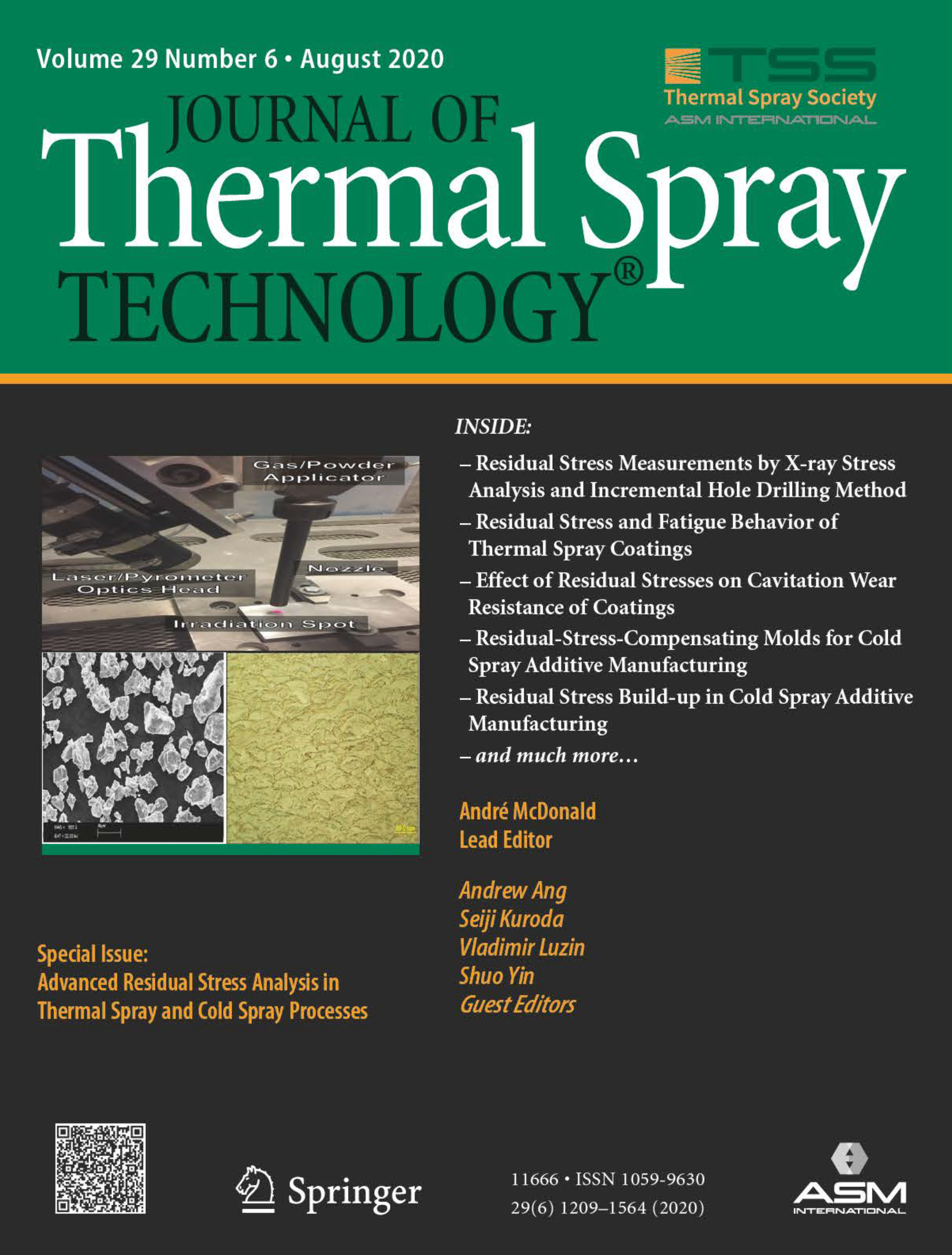
- Discipline: Engineering
- Language: English
- Edited by: Armelle Vardelle

Publication details
- History: 1992–present
- Publisher: Springer Science+Business Media on behalf of ASM International
- Frequency: 8/year
- Impact factor: 3.2 (2023)

Standard abbreviations
- ISO 4: J. Therm. Spray Technol.

Indexing
- CODEN: JTTEE5
- ISSN: 1059-9630 (print); 1544-1016 (web)
- LCCN: 92644063
- OCLC no.: 43048169

Links
- Journal homepage; Online archive

The Journal of Thermal Spray Technology is a peer-reviewed scientific journal that is dedicated to thermal science and its application for the improvement of material properties and functionality of coatings. The journal regularly publishes review papers and special issues. it is published by Springer Science+Business Media on behalf of ASM International. The editor-in-chief is Armelle Vardelle (Université de Limoges).

== Abstracting and indexing ==
The journal is abstracted and indexed in:

- Astrophysics Data System
- Chemical Abstracts Service
- Current Contents/Engineering, Computing and Technology
- Ei Compendex
- Inspec
- INIS Atomindex
- PASCAL
- ProQuest databases
- Science Citation Index
- Scopus

According to the Journal Citation Reports, the journal has a 2023 impact factor of 3.2.
