= Ohio Department of Education =

Ohio state agency for public education

Coordinates: 39.961595°N 83.002879°W

Department of Education and Workforce
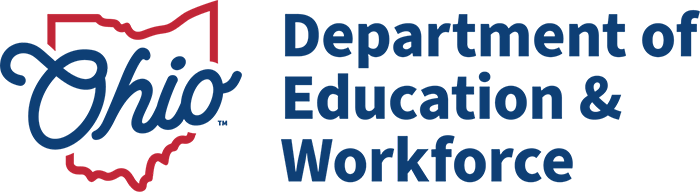

Department overview
- Formed: October 20, 2023; 2 years ago
- Preceding department: Ohio Department of Education
- Jurisdiction: Ohio
- Headquarters: 25 South Front Street Columbus, Ohio, U.S.
- Department executive: Stephen D. Dackin, Director
- Website: education.ohio.gov

The Ohio Department of Education and Workforce (DEW) is the administrative department of the Ohio state government responsible for primary and secondary public education in the state. It is a cabinet level state agency and the director is appointed by the governor. The Ohio State Board of Education used to be the governing body of the department but House Bill 33 (signed by Governor Mike DeWine in July 2023) transferred most of the duties of the State Board of Education to the newly created Ohio Department of Education and Workforce. The department is headquartered in Columbus. The department and the State Board of Education are two separate agencies.

The department is responsible for implementing standardized tests required by state and federal law, including Ohio's State Tests, Ohio Graduation Test (OGT), and the Ohio English Language Proficiency Assessment (OELPA, formerly OTELA). The department does not have jurisdiction over higher education; Ohio's public colleges and universities are governed as part of the University System of Ohio by the Ohio Department of Higher Education and by the boards of trustees of each institution.

== State Board of Education ==
The State Board of Education of Ohio is a separate entity from the Ohio Department of Education and Workforce.

The Board of Education currently consists of 19 members. All serve four-year terms.

Eleven of these are elected from 11 single-member districts, which are formed by combining three contiguous Ohio Senate districts. The governor appoints eight "at large" members. All serve four year terms. The elected members' terms are staggered so that half of the board is elected in each even-numbered year. Vacancies in the elected membership are filled by appointment by the governor. The chairman of the Ohio House of Representatives Education Committee and his or her counterpart in the Ohio State Senate are ex officio members.

The chairs of the Ohio House of Representatives and Ohio Senate education committees are ex officio non-voting members of the board. The board is responsible for choosing a Superintendent of Public Instruction, who manages the day-to-day affairs of the agency.

In 2025, Ohio's biennial budget (HB96) changed the structure of the State Board of Education. The eleven districts and three of the appointed seats will be eliminated, with only five appointed seats remaining that will each represent rural, suburban, urban, charter, and community schools. As elected and appointed members either resign or serve out their terms, the membership will be reduced until there are only five appointed members.

The elections are formally nonpartisan, with the party affiliations below reflecting known political history, candidate self-declaration, or state party support.

=== Elected Members ===
District	Name	Start	Party	Next Election
1	Kristie Reighard	January 1, 2025	Democratic	2028
2	Teresa Fedor	January 1, 2023	Democratic	2026
3	Charlotte McGuire	January 2017	Republican	2026 (term limited)
4	Katie Hofmann	January 1, 2023	Democratic	2026
5	Mary Binegar	January 1, 2025	Democratic	2028
6	Cathye Flory	January 1, 2025	Republican	2028
7	Rhonda Johnson	January 1, 2025	Democratic	2028
8	Karen Lloyd	January 1, 2025	Democratic	2028
9	John Hagan	January 1, 2019 (Note: Hagan was elected to the 8th district, and was reassigned to the 9th district by Gov. Mike DeWine on January 31, 2022 as part of decennial redistricting.)	Republican	2026 (term limited)
10	Tom Jackson	January 1, 2023	Democratic	2026
11	Delores Ford	January 1, 2025	Democratic	2028

=== Appointed Members ===
Name	Start	Party	Term End
Sara Carruthers	January 1, 2025	Republican	December 31, 2028
Walt Davis	June 30, 2021	Independent	December 31, 2026
Amy Fugate	February 16, 2024	Independent	December 31, 2028
Lori Kershner	January 1, 2025	Independent	December 31, 2028
Mark Lamoncha	January 4, 2019	Independent	December 31, 2026
Paul LaRue	August 26, 2020	Independent	December 31, 2026
James Mermis	January 1, 2023	Independent	December 31, 2026
Gloria Rodgers	January 1, 2025	Independent	December 31, 2028

== See also ==
- Education in Ohio
