= Russell Township, Geauga County, Ohio =

Township in Ohio, US

- Township
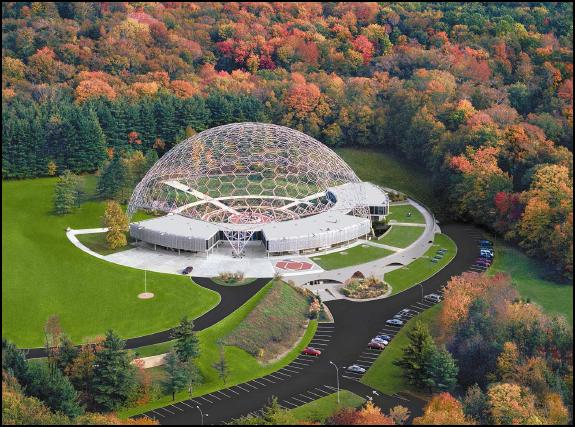
- Headquarters of ASM International

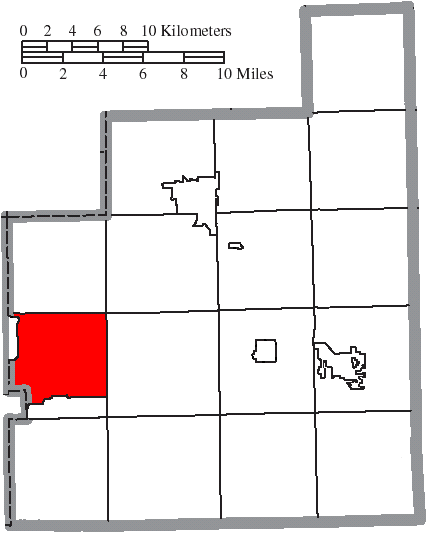
- Location of Russell Township in Geauga County
- Coordinates: 41°28′8″N 81°20′58″W
- Country: United States
- State: Ohio
- County: Geauga

Area
  - Total: 19.4 sq mi (50.2 km^{2})
  - Land: 19.2 sq mi (49.7 km^{2})
  - Water: 0.19 sq mi (0.5 km^{2})
- Elevation: 1,086 ft (331 m)

Population (2020)
  - Total: 5,404
  - Density: 282/sq mi (109/km^{2})
- Time zone: UTC-5 (Eastern (EST))
  - Summer (DST): UTC-4 (EDT)
- ZIP code: 44072
- Area code: 440
- FIPS code: 39-69232
- GNIS feature ID: 1086160
- Website: russelltownship.us

Russell Township is one of the sixteen townships of Geauga County, Ohio, United States. As of the 2020 census the population was 5,404.

== Geography ==
Located in the western part of the county, it borders the following townships and villages:

- Chester Township - north
- Munson Township - northeast corner
- Newbury Township - east
- Auburn Township - southeast corner
- Bainbridge Township - south
- Chagrin Falls, Cuyahoga County - southwest, south of Chagrin Falls Township
- Chagrin Falls Township, Cuyahoga County - southwest, north of Chagrin Falls
- Moreland Hills - west, south of Hunting Valley
- Hunting Valley - west, north of Moreland Hills
- Gates Mills - northwest corner

== Name and history ==
It is the only Russell Township statewide. Another name for the area is Novelty, from the name of the post office located, in the unincorporated community of Novelty, in the township.

The first five inhabitants — Gideon Russell and his family, who came in 1818 — settled on what today is Chillicothe Road. In 1827 the township was named Russell, although it had been previously known as the West Woods by neighboring communities. In April of that year the people elected John Lowry, Clark Robinson, and Gideon Russell as their first township trustees. It was Robinson that created the first framed building and started the first store.

== Economy ==
Russell is the home of ASM International, formerly known as the American Society for Metals, whose headquarters is marked by a gigantic geodesic dome, visited by Buckminster Fuller upon its completion.

Nearly all of the non-incorporated parts of the township are served in education by the West Geauga district. (South Russell village and a small part of the rest is covered by the Chagrin Falls district.) In private education, the Butler Campus of Laurel School is on Fairmount Road (originally named "Fairmount Campus" for its location), which has a lodge, pavilion, tree house, residence, and adventure course.

== Government ==
The township is governed by a three-member board of trustees, who are elected in November of odd-numbered years to a four-year term beginning on the following January 1. Two are elected in the year after the presidential election and one is elected in the year before it. There is also an elected township fiscal officer, who serves a four-year term beginning on April 1 of the year after the election, which is held in November of the year before the presidential election. Vacancies in the fiscal officership or on the board of trustees are filled by the remaining trustees.

== Transportation ==
Major roads include State Route 306 and State Route 87.
