= North Avondale, Cincinnati =

Coordinates: 39°09′19″N 84°29′19″W

North Avondale
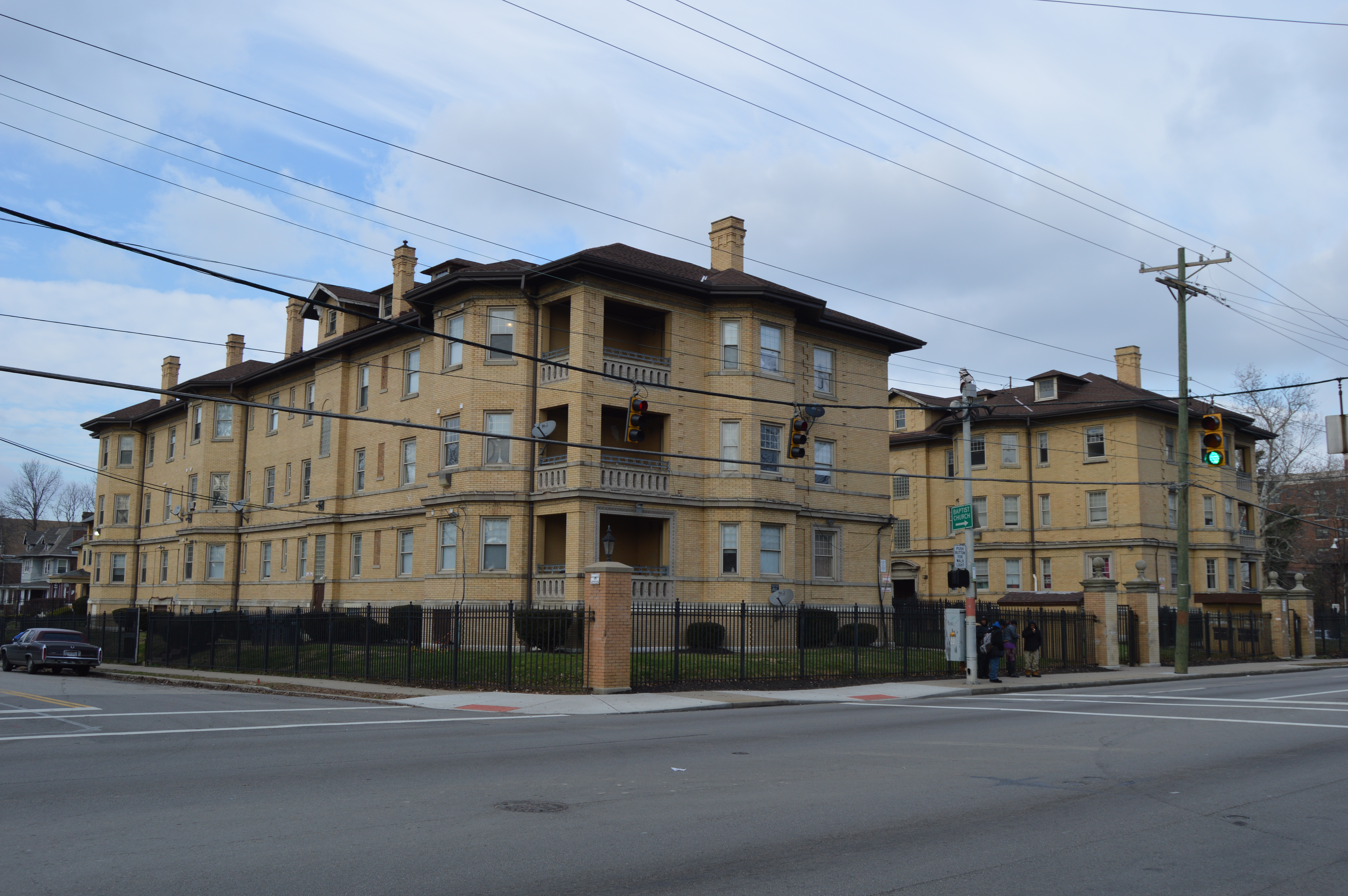
- Crescent Apartments in North Avondale

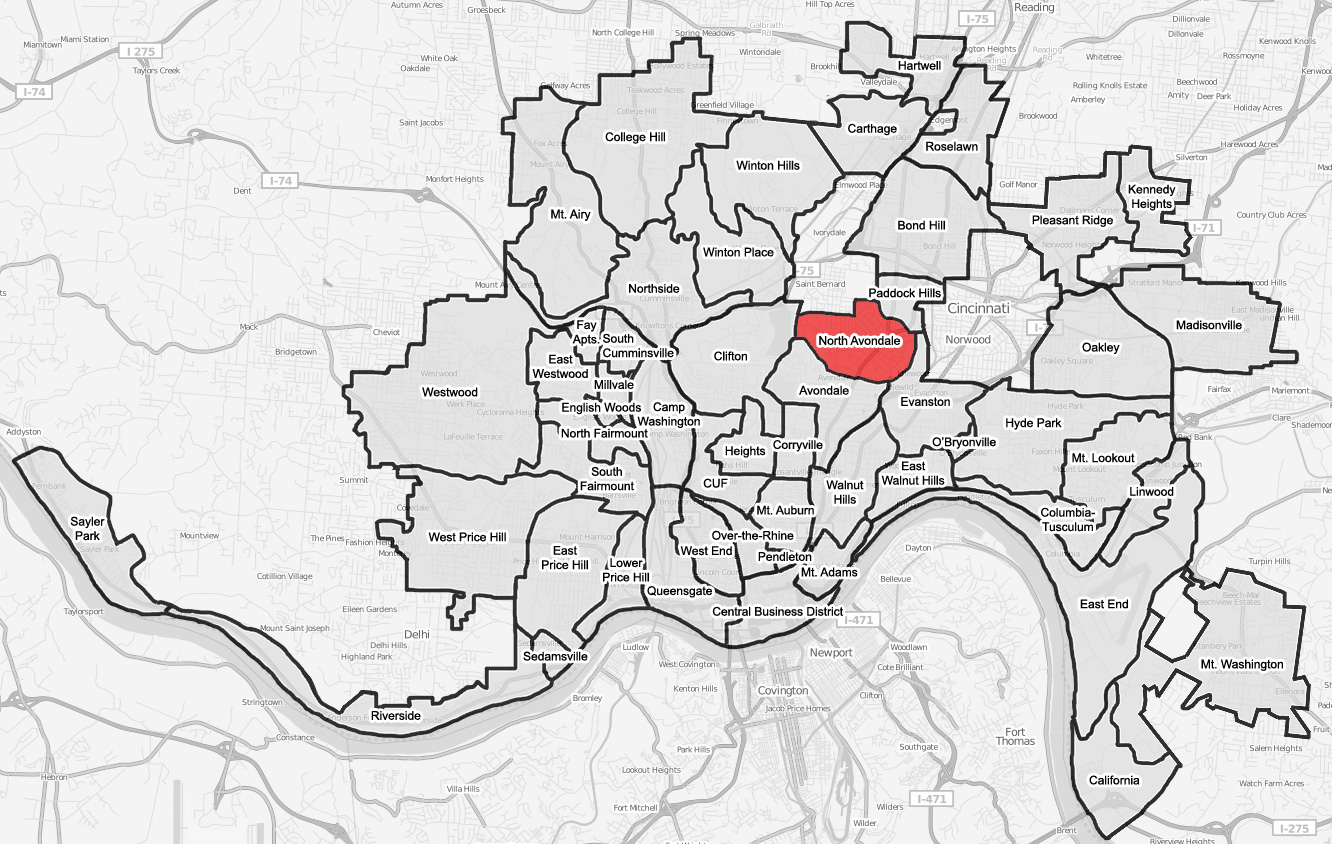
- North Avondale (red) within Cincinnati, Ohio.
- Country: United States
- State: Ohio
- City: Cincinnati

Population (2020)
  - Total: 3,405

North Avondale is one of the 52 neighborhoods of Cincinnati, Ohio. It is home to Xavier University and the Avon Woods Preserve. The population was 3,405 at the 2020 census.

== Demographics ==
As of the census of 2020, there were 3,405 people living in the neighborhood. There were 1,735 housing units. The racial makeup of the neighborhood was 39.1% White, 50.4% Black or African American, 0.6% Native American, 1.4% Asian, 0.0% Pacific Islander, 2.2% from some other race, and 6.2% from two or more races. 3.7% of the population were Hispanic or Latino of any race.

There were 1,607 households, out of which 64.1% were families. 33.7% of all households were made up of individuals.

16.9% of the neighborhood's population were under the age of 18, 53.9% were 18 to 64, and 29.2% were 65 years of age or older. 47.0% of the population were male and 53.0% were female.

According to the U.S. Census American Community Survey, for the period 2016-2020 the estimated median annual income for a household in the neighborhood was $39,455. About 6.1% of family households were living below the poverty line. About 51.7% of adults had a bachelor's degree or higher.

== Education ==
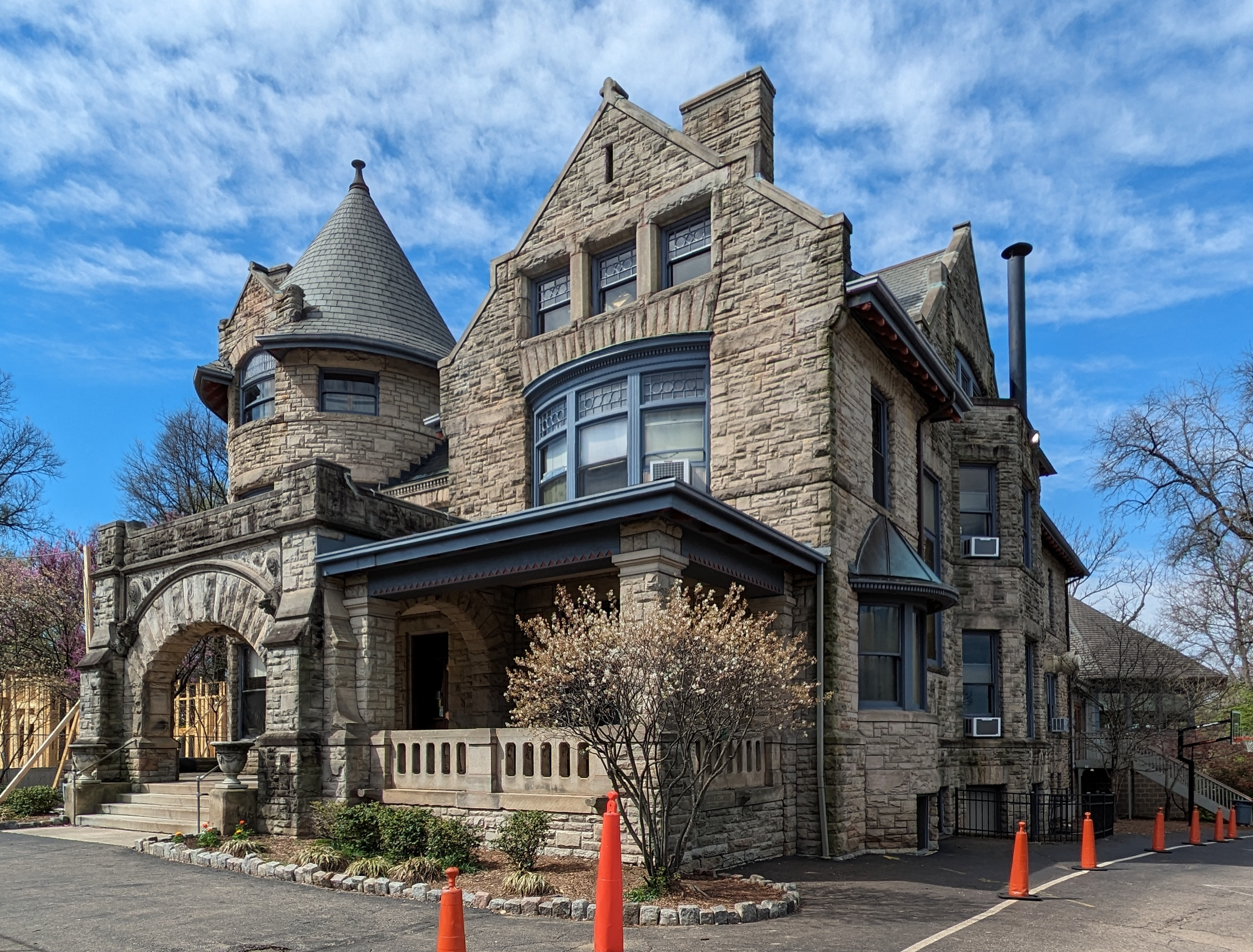
The New School

North Avondale is home to two elementary schools. North Avondale Montessori serves preschool through 6th grade and is part of the Cincinnati Public Schools system. The New School Montessori is a private elementary school serving preschool through 6th grade, and is accredited by the American Montessori Society.

Xavier University is partially located in North Avondale, and also offers a Montessori laboratory school for students ages 3–12.
