= Nikos Bel-Jon =

Greek American artist (1911–1966)

- Born: Nikolaos Baloyannis; 20 March 1911; Valtesiniko, Arcadia, Greece
- Died: 11 August 1966 (aged 55); New York, USA
- Website: bel-jonstudios.com

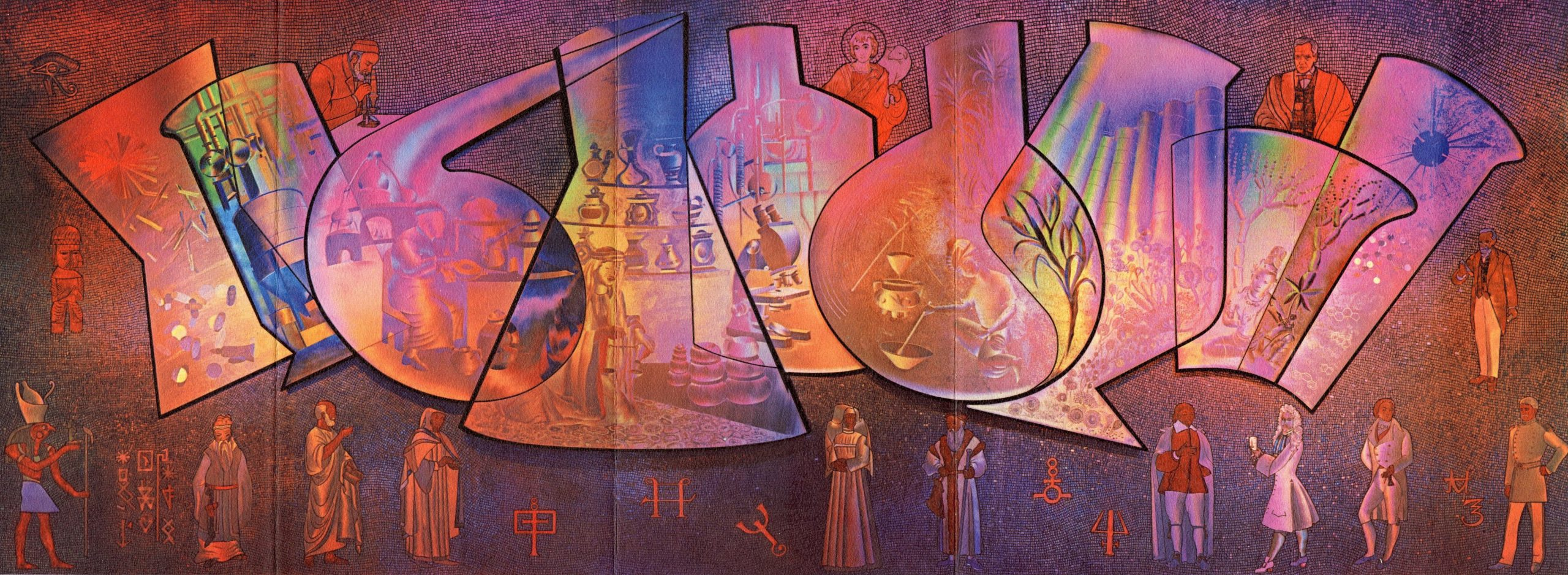
Medical Research Through the Ages (1961), formerly installed at the New York office of Pfizer

Nikos Bel-Jon (20 March 1911 – 11 August 1966) was a Greek American artist.

He was born Nikolaos Baloyannis (Νικόλαος Μπαλογιάννης) in the village of Valtesiniko (now part of the municipality of Gortynia), Arcadia.

After receiving his master's from the Athens School of Fine Arts in Athens in 1936, Bel-Jon continued his studies at the École des Beaux-Arts and the École du Louvre in Paris on a Greek government scholarship in 1938.

He also studied Byzantine art at Mount Athos in 1935.

Bel-Jon served in the Greek army during the Greco-Italian War and was hospitalised for shrapnel in his leg, an injury that plagued him for the rest of his life.

In 1946, he returned to France to continue his studies under a French government scholarship.

That same year, he emigrated to the United States and took up residence in Los Angeles, where he met his wife, Troy Kendall, also an artist. They were married in 1947 and had two daughters.

Bel-Jon began experimenting with murals on metal, a genre for which he is best known.

Moving to San Francisco, in 1950 Bel-Jon opened a studio on Maiden Lane.

He also changed his name to Nikos Bel-Jon and became a US citizen in 1952.

He subsequently moved to New York, where he opened a studio.

In 1964, Bel-Jon was decorated by the Greek state with the Order of the Phoenix in recognition of his art and contribution to Greek heritage.

He died in New York.
