= Novelty, Ohio =

Novelty, Geauga County, Ohio
- Unincorporated community
- Location within Ohio Location within the United States
- Coordinates: 41°29′41″N 81°20′26″W
- Country: United States
- State: Ohio
- County: Geauga
- Elevation: 1,063 ft (324 m)
- Time zone: UTC-5 (Eastern (EST))
  - Summer (DST): UTC-4 (EDT)
- ZIP codes: 44072
- Area code: Area code 440
- GNIS feature ID: 1049029

Novelty is an unincorporated community in Russell Township, Geauga County, Ohio, United States.
