= Harris Dental Museum =

Historic house in Ohio, United States

- Dr. John Harris Dental School
- U.S. National Register of Historic Places
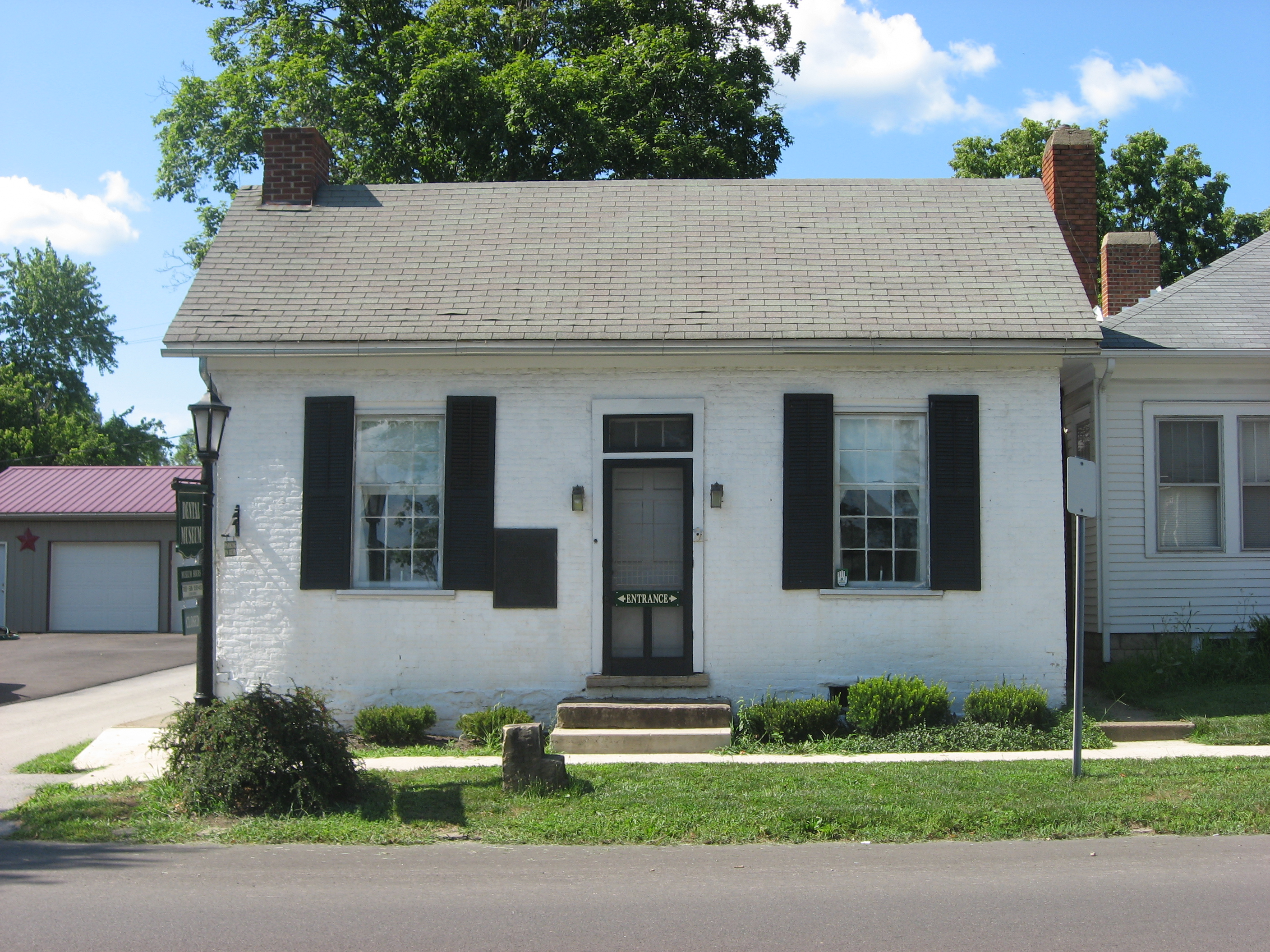
- Front of the museum

- Location within Ohio Location within the United States
- Location: Main Street (US 50), Bainbridge, Ohio
- Coordinates: 39°13′38″N 83°16′21″W
- Area: 0.3 acres (0.12 ha)
- Built: 1815
- NRHP reference No.: 73001521
- Added to NRHP: July 23, 1973

The Harris Dental Museum is a small brick building in the village of Bainbridge in Ross County, Ohio, United States. Built as a residence in 1815, it once housed the first dental school in the United States, and it is now operated as a museum.

A native of Pompey, New York, John Harris settled in the Ohio community of Madison in 1819; after practicing medicine with a specialty in dental work, he moved to Bainbridge and soon embarked on training young doctors. Unlike most teachers of medicine at this time, Harris paid great attention to dentistry. In later years, his students continued his enthusiasm for the subject by establishing several more permanent dental schools; among these students was his brother Chapin, who founded the Baltimore College of Dental Surgery, the first formal dental college in the United States. Today, Harris is recognized as the pioneer of American dental education because of his emphasis on teaching dentistry, and his former dental school is a museum operated by the Ohio Dental Association. Purchased by the association in 1938, it opened as a museum in 1968 as the Dr. John Harris Dental Museum. As such, it has been restored to an almost original condition, and tours are given to members of the public.

The museum structure is a small brick building on Bainbridge's western side. One story tall with an ell on one side, it is covered with an asphalt roof. In recognition of its historic significance, the dental school was listed on the National Register of Historic Places in 1973 under the name of "Dr. John Harris Dental School." One of four places in or around Bainbridge to be included on the Register, it has been rated as being significant throughout Ohio's history.

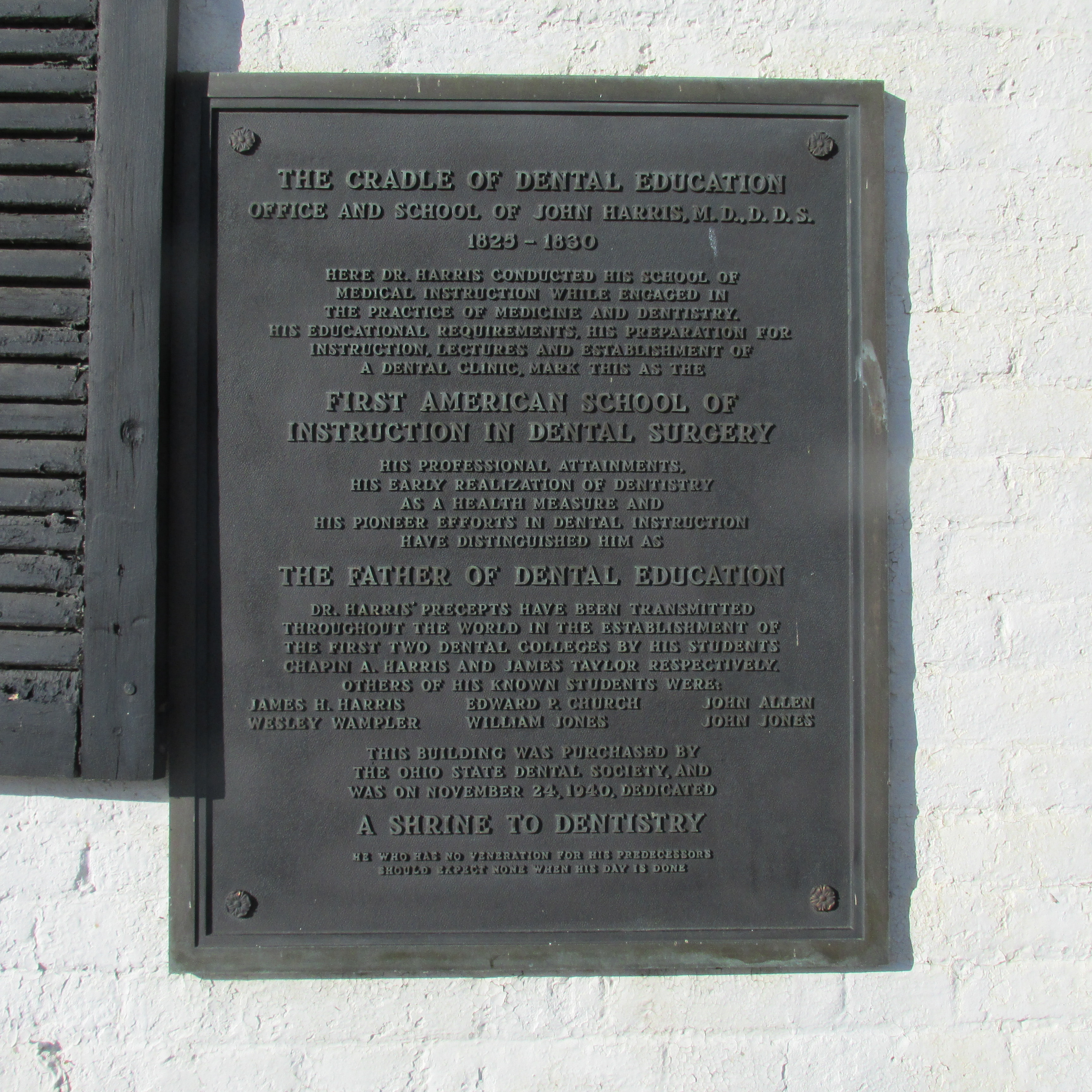
Plaque dedicated on November 24, 1940, on the front of museum.
