= Aullwood Audubon Center and Farm =

Nature center in Ohio, United States

Coordinates: 39°52′23″N 84°16′31″W

- Interactive map of Aullwood Audubon Center and Farm
- Type: Nature center and farm
- Nearest city: Dayton, Ohio
- Created: 1957

Aullwood Audubon Center and Farm AKA Aullwood Audubon is an environmental education, sustainable agriculture, and Audubon Center of the National Audubon Society. Aullwood Audubon includes a nature center (Marie S. Aull Education Center), educational farm and farm discovery center (Aullwood Farm and Charity A. Krueger Farm Discovery Center), and a 200 acre nature sanctuary with 8 miles of walking trails. Aullwood Audubon is located in Montgomery County in southwestern Ohio, United States, about 10 miles (16 km) northwest of downtown Dayton.

== History ==
Decades ago, Marie Aull gave her land to Ohio's Miami Valley, creating National Audubon Society's first nature center in the Midwest. Today as visitors explore the Marie S. Aull Education Center, walk the trails and experience Aullwood's sustainable farm, they discover why Aull's gift is a paragon among nature centers. More than 110,000 people of all ages engage in exciting on-site or outreach programs every year. By nourishing familiarity with nature and sustainable agriculture, Aullwood stimulates many visitors to environmental activism.

Marie Aull donated 70 acres of land to the National Audubon Society in 1957. She had approached John H. Baker, then President of the National Audubon Society, with the idea of creating the first nature center in the Midwest. Marie Aull had a great love for plants and animals. It was her idea to create a nature sanctuary where teachers and children could learn about plants, animals, and ecological concepts. It was her hope that these children would be taught by trained naturalists: people who were knowledgeable and sensitive to the land. Her intention to create the first nature center in the Midwestern United States, was realized with the opening of the Aullwood Audubon Center. Over 25,000 children received free 90-minute thematic guided programs.

In 1962, the 120 acre Antrim Farm adjacent to Aullwood Audubon Center was placed on the market. Mrs. Aull purchased the farm because proposed development would have drained the springs which fed the creek. The creek flows through the center's land and even through Mrs. Aull's garden. Mrs. Aull donated a portion of the land to the National Audubon Society. Mrs. Aull envisioned a children's farm with livestock which children could see, touch and hear, and fields where they could watch crops grow. She felt it was important for people to understand the importance of the family farm in American culture. This facility was operated independently from the Center with a separate staff and budget. It too offered a variety of 90-minute field trips exploring agricultural life.

In 1978, the center and farm were combined into one operation with one staff. The facility was renamed Aullwood Audubon Center and Farm. In 1979, Friends of Aullwood was incorporated to generate greater community and financial support. In accordance with an agreement formalized between Audubon and Friends of Aullwood, Inc., on September 23, 1986, Friends of Aullwood assumed primary responsibility for funding the operation of Aullwood Audubon from Audubon. In 1989, the 120 acre farm was transferred to the Dayton Foundation, with management by Friends of Aullwood.

In 1995, 150 acres were added to Aullwood's sanctuary through a long-term lease agreement with the Dayton International Airport. This land was converted in Ohio's largest restored tallgrass prairie. The prairie is named in honor of retired education coordinator, Paul Knoop Jr. At this time Aullwood is no longer leasing the land from the airport.

To honor Marie Aull, the new $4.3 million education wing was built in 2000, the year of her 103rd birthday. Marie Aull died August 30, 2002, at the age of 105.

In 2012, the multimillion dollar Charity A. Krueger Farm Discovery Center was completed at Aullwood Farm, putting Aullwood 's educational farm on the cutting edge of sustainable education.

Today, Aullwood's farm, center and sanctuary make it one of the premier Audubon sites in the United States.

== Mission, Facilities and Activities ==
Aullwood Audubon Center and Farm, an Audubon Center for environmental education and sustainable agriculture, provides activities that increase understanding and preservation of the planet by children and adults through education, research and recreation. Aullwood offers both children and adults the opportunity to experience and appreciate the world through experience-based education. Aullwood offers a number of special events throughout the year, as well as educational public and school programs.

Aullwood itself consists of two major locations, Aullwood Nature Center and Aullwood Farm, connected by eight miles of walking trails running through a 200-acre nature sanctuary. Aullwood Nature Center is located at 1000 Aullwood Road, Dayton, OH 45414. Aullwood Farm is located at 9101 Frederick Pike, Dayton, OH 45414.

At Aullwood's Marie S. Aull Education Center, you will find two themed discovery rooms and six thematic classrooms containing interactive displays, informative exhibits, educational games, native animals and animal specimens. The facility also houses live animals, including snakes, turtles, fish and more. Other features include a Bird Watching Room, where one can observe many birds at outdoor feeding and watering stations, the Windows on Wildlife room, an excellent place for quiet reflection, an auditorium for lectures and special exhibits, and Aullwood's Gift Shop which offers wildlife related books, gifts and more. The grounds feature a geology trail, a wildflower trail, and several different habitats, including a marsh, vernal pool, pond, prairie and meadow.

At Aullwood Farm, the Charity A. Krueger Farm Discovery Center welcomes visitors and is the educational gateway to Aullwood Farm. It is the primary educational facility for agricultural and nature programs and also houses farm offices, learning classrooms where classes such as annual candle dipping workshops are held, interactive farm exhibits, the Liz Wyse auditorium (available for rental) as well as the Miami Valley Child Development Center (MVCDC) Head Start Preschool.

Beyond the Discovery Center, features include the large Farm Yard, and the Wyse Pavilion (available for rental), a central location from which one can admire the farm's buildings, landscape and animals. A Bank Barn built in the German heritage style of the 1800s is also present, while pastures and buildings around the barn provide habitat for cattle, turkeys and goats. A Sheep Barn provides a small sheltered pen and adjacent pasture access. Other items of note include the Spring House with adjacent windmill, a Duck Pond with observation deck, the spectacular Greenview Garden Club's Herb Garden and the compact Children's Sustainable Garden. Other farm features include the Chicken Coop, Brood House, Bee Yard and 15 acre Sugar Bush woodland features sugar maples and other native hardwoods like beech and cherry. A variety of animals reside at the farm and can often be seen in their respective buildings or wandering the attached land.

== Hours and Admission ==
Aullwood Audubon is open 9 AM to 5 PM Tuesday through Saturday and 1 PM to 5 PM Sunday. Aullwood's Nature Center, Farm Discovery Center, trails and property are closed on Mondays. Aullwood's trails are only open during business hours. Admission or membership is required to visit Aullwood Audubon's nature center, farm, sanctuary and trails. As of January 2022, general admission is free for children 3 and under, $8.00 for children 4 to 12, $12.00 for adults 13 to 64, and $10.00 for seniors age 65 and over and active duty military members. Members of Friends of Aullwood, National Audubon Society and ANCA receive free admission with membership card. Admission prices for special events at Aullwood vary.
