= Avon Woods Preserve =

Park in Ohio, United States

Coordinates: 39°09′45″N 84°28′44″W

Avon Woods Nature Preserve and Center
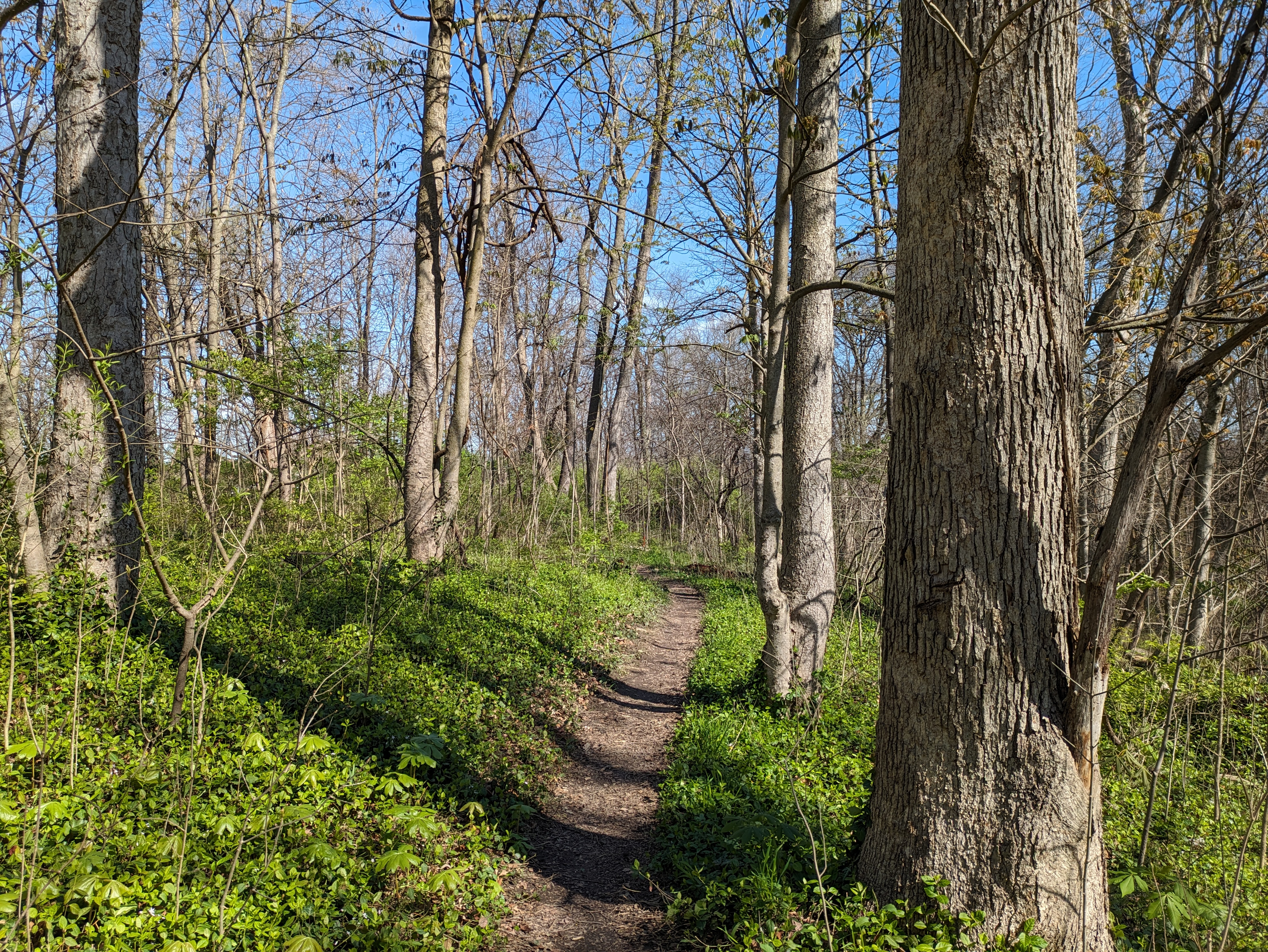
- Interactive map of Avon Woods Nature Preserve and Center
- Location: Cincinnati, Ohio
- Website: www.cincinnati-oh.gov/cincyparks/visit-a-park/find-a-parkfacility/avon-woods-nature-preserve-center/

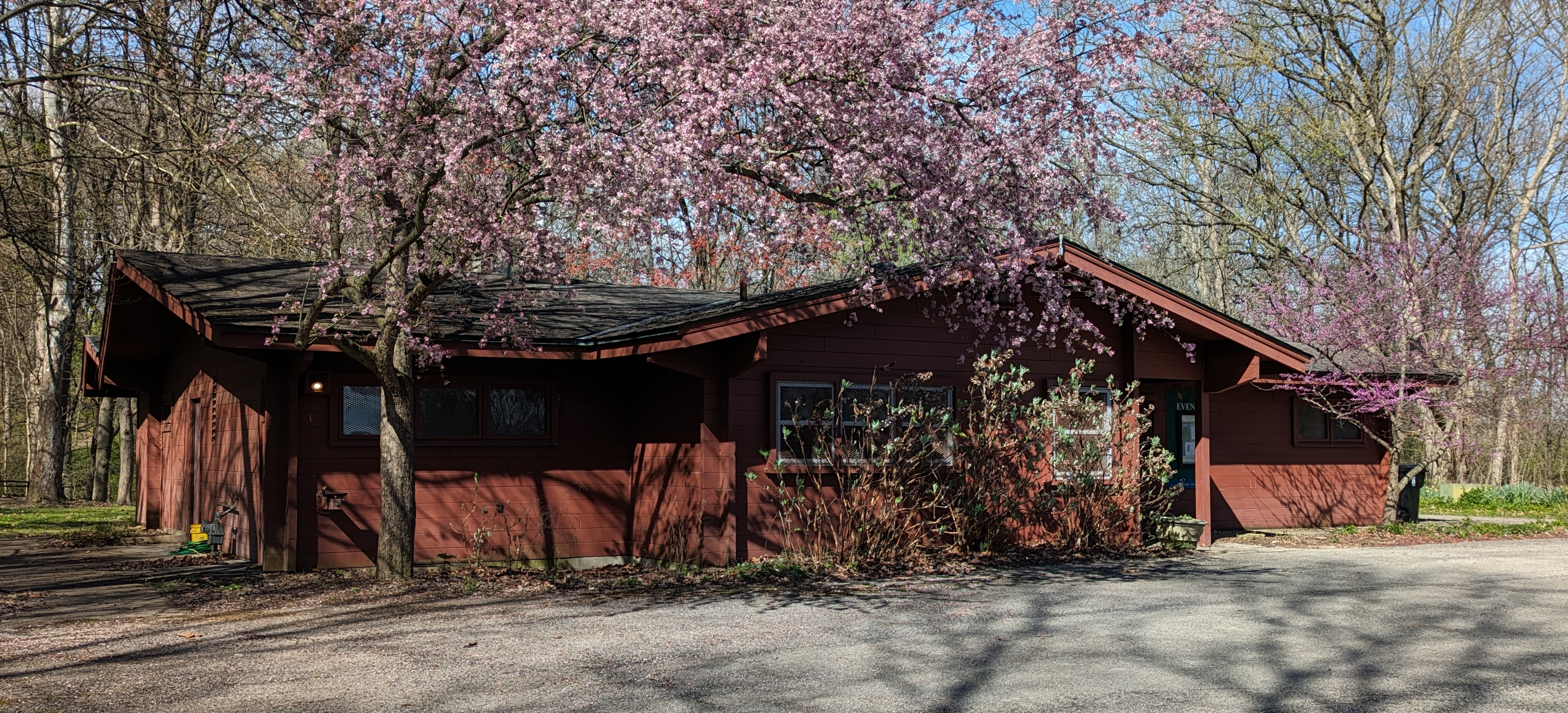
Avon Woods Nature Center

The Avon Woods Preserve, owned and operated by the Cincinnati Park Board, is a city park in the North Avondale neighborhood of Cincinnati, Ohio. The park has nature trails, gardens, a nature center and stream, as well as educational programs offered to children. Avon Woods is a nature preserve and is made up of rolling hills, hiking trails and a valley.
