= The Wilderness Center (Ohio) =

Nonprofit nature center

- Abbreviation: TWC
- Formation: June 19, 1964; 62 years ago (as Stark Wilderness Center)
- Type: 501(c)(3) nonprofit
- Tax ID no.: 34-0943581
- Headquarters: 9877 Alabama Ave SW
- Locations: Wilmot, Ohio, United States; Tuscarawas County, Ohio, United States
- Coordinates: 40°40′21″N 81°38′30″W
- Origins: Canton Audubon Society
- Region served: Wilderness Lake, Zoar Woods
- Services: School programs, interest clubs, podcast
- Executive Director: Jeanne Gural
- President: Roger Baker
- Main organ: Board
- Revenue: $2.34 m (2022)
- Expenses: $1.39 m (2022)
- Funding: Private donations, ecopreneural ventures
- Website: wildernesscenter.org
- Formerly called: Stark Wilderness Center

The Wilderness Center (TWC) is a 501(c)3 nonprofit nature center that operates its headquarters in Wilmot, Ohio, located in southwest Stark County, Ohio. It includes an interpretive building, astronomy education building, an observation tower, pier and picnic shelters. TWC's 10 miles of trails go through forest, prairie and along streams and creeks and past ponds and Wilderness Lake. TWC also maintains hiking trails on its Zoar Woods satellite property in northeast Tuscarawas County, Ohio. TWC owns or holds conservation easements on other tracts of land throughout a six-county area. TWC preserves these lands in forested or agricultural condition.

== Mission ==
The Wilderness Center's mission is to inspire and nurture a connection between people and nature through habitat conservation, environmental education, and community engagement.

== History ==
In 1963, the Canton Audubon Society began raising community interest in establishing an outdoor education center. School administrators endorsed the idea. On June 19, 1964, the founders incorporated as the Stark Wilderness Center, a non-profit organization for scientific and educational purposes. The Hart Interpretive Building was opened on April 28, 1974. The name was changed to The Wilderness Center, Inc., on January 18, 1979.

TWC’s Sigrist Woods is recognized by the Ohio Department of Natural Resources as an Ohio Natural Landmark and Lash's Bog is designated a State Nature Preserve.

== Education ==
TWC offers other programs for schools, family, youth and adults such as turtle days, salamander and snake hikes, monarch butterfly tagging, family astronomy programs and bimonthly nature hikes.

TWC's interest clubs include astronomers, backpackers & dayhikers, birders, geocachers, nature photographers, and woodcarvers. These groups offer trips, speakers and other events in their interest areas.

The Wilderness also hosts a weekly science and nature podcast called Wild Ideas – The Podcast, where staff members and guests discuss various topics particularly related to the season. The first episode was posted on March 27, 2009. Wild Ideas – The Podcast is found on iTunes and most other podcast hosting websites.

== Conservation and land stewardship ==
TWC currently has almost 3,000 acres of land under its protection. The main 650-acre tract is in the southwest corner of Stark County, where the headquarters is located. TWC owns an additional 870 acres in 6 counties, and holds conservation easements on additional 1,500 acres. All of TWC's properties have a land management plan that includes a Wetland Mitigation Bank.

The Wilderness Center is approved to offer stream mitigation under its in-lieu fee agreement with the U.S. Army Corps of Engineers Huntington District and the Ohio Environmental Protection Agency.

== Ecopreneurism ==
The Wilderness Center is funded through private donations and revenue generated through its ecopreneurial ventures, including:

- Foxfield Preserve is a nature preserve cemetery operated by The Wilderness Center. It is the first nature preserve cemetery operated by a non-profit conservation organization in the U.S. and the first of its kind in Ohio.
- TWC Consulting Forestry is a professional consulting business that provides sustainable forest management and timber marketing services for private landowners.
- TWC offers ecotours to various destinations both domestic and international.
- TWC also operates a revolving land fund to purchase a key parcel for another organization or government agency. When the other organization is able to raise the funds, it repurchases the land. The revolving land fund has benefited Camp Tuscazoar, Beech Creek Botanical Gardens and Nature Preserve and Stark Parks.
