= Bing Act =

1921 education law in Ohio

The Bing Act of 1921 was an Ohio law, adopted April 29, 1921, that stated children between the ages of six and eighteen are required to attend school. There were two major exceptions to this law: a child who had already graduated high school did not have to stay in school until turning eighteen; and a child who was sixteen years old and had passed the seventh grade was allowed to work as a farmer instead of attending school.

The Bing Bill was drafted for Ohio legislation by Ohio Council of Child Welfare's education committee. Although the Bill had many supporters, women's groups were the primary activists for the bill. On January 24, 1921, the bill was introduced to the Ohio House of Representatives by Simeon H. Bing from Gallia County, chairman of the House of Representatives Committee on Schools and President of Rio Grande College.

The Bing Bill was opposed by groups such as farmers and the Amish. They didn't want to take their children out of the workforce and they knew it would cost them more with taxes being raised to run the schools. They also thought the schools would train the children to be delinquent and have bad behavior. Supporters argued that schooling would help the young farmers bring more efficient practices and modern ideas to the farms.

This law was created to stop child labor. Business wanted to employ children so that they could pay them less money than they would an adult worker. People who opposed child labor were proponents for the Bing act as it mandated that children had to be at least sixteen years of age to work in most industries in Ohio. At the age of sixteen, children had to get a work permit from their parents and school to say they had passed the seventh grade and were allowed to work.

When children were forced to attend school, some families had financial troubles because they relied on their children to help financially and help on the farms. The schools also had financial trouble because more children attended schools. Every school had to have equivalent education through the highs school level and rural schools needed transportation. The Ohio Legislature adopted a 3% sales tax that gave half of the funds to the school districts for education purposes and operating costs. This increased literacy.
