= Pike Lake State Park (Ohio) =

Park in Ohio, USA

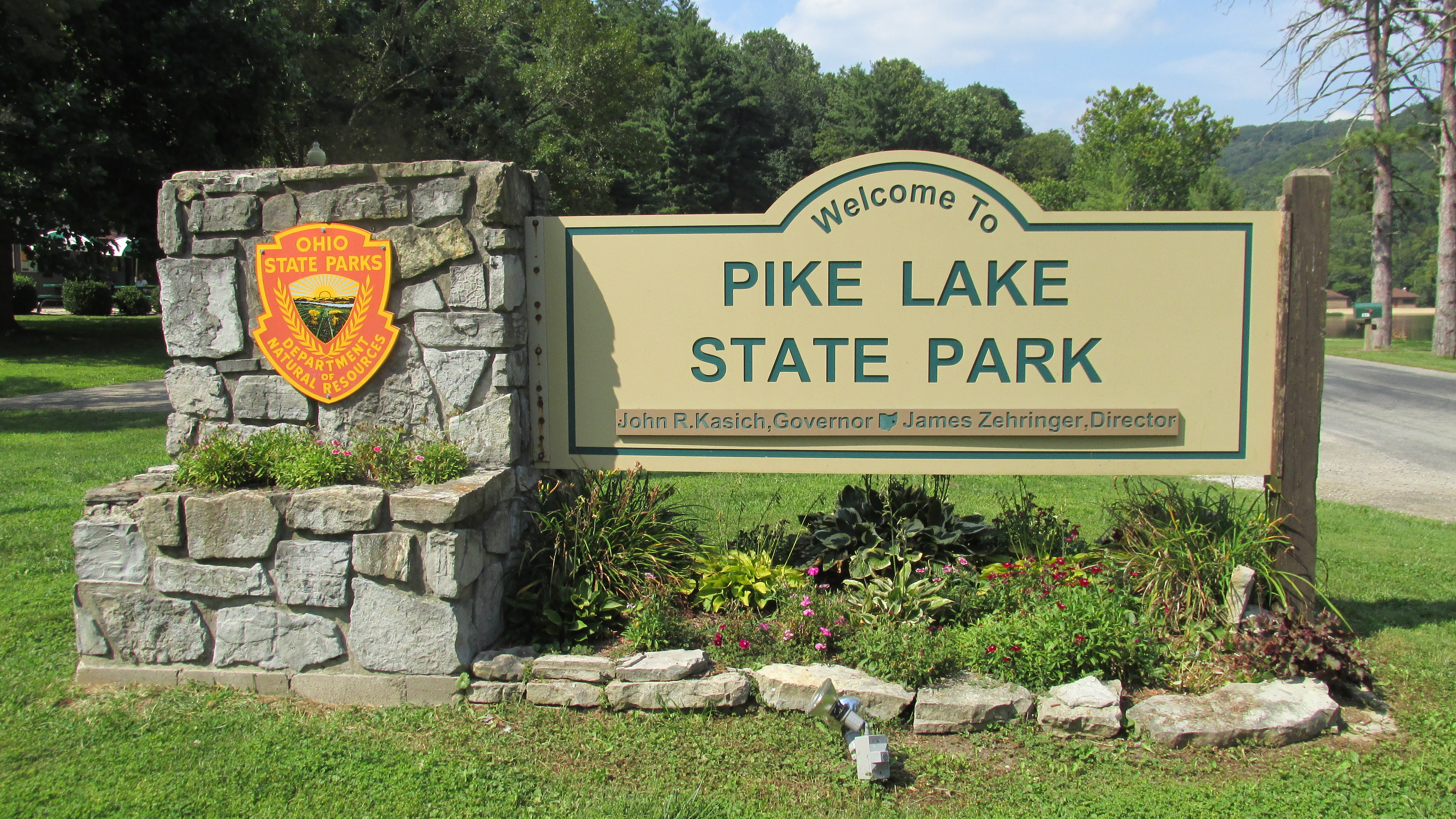
- Entrance sign

- Location within Ohio Location within the United States
- Location: Pike County, Ohio, United States
- Coordinates: 39°09′38″N 83°13′11″W
- Area: Land: 587 acres (238 ha); Water: 13 acres (5.3 ha)
- Elevation: 755 feet (230 m)
- Established: 1949
- Administrator: Ohio Department of Natural Resources
- Designation: Ohio state park
- Website: Pike Lake State Park Pike Lake
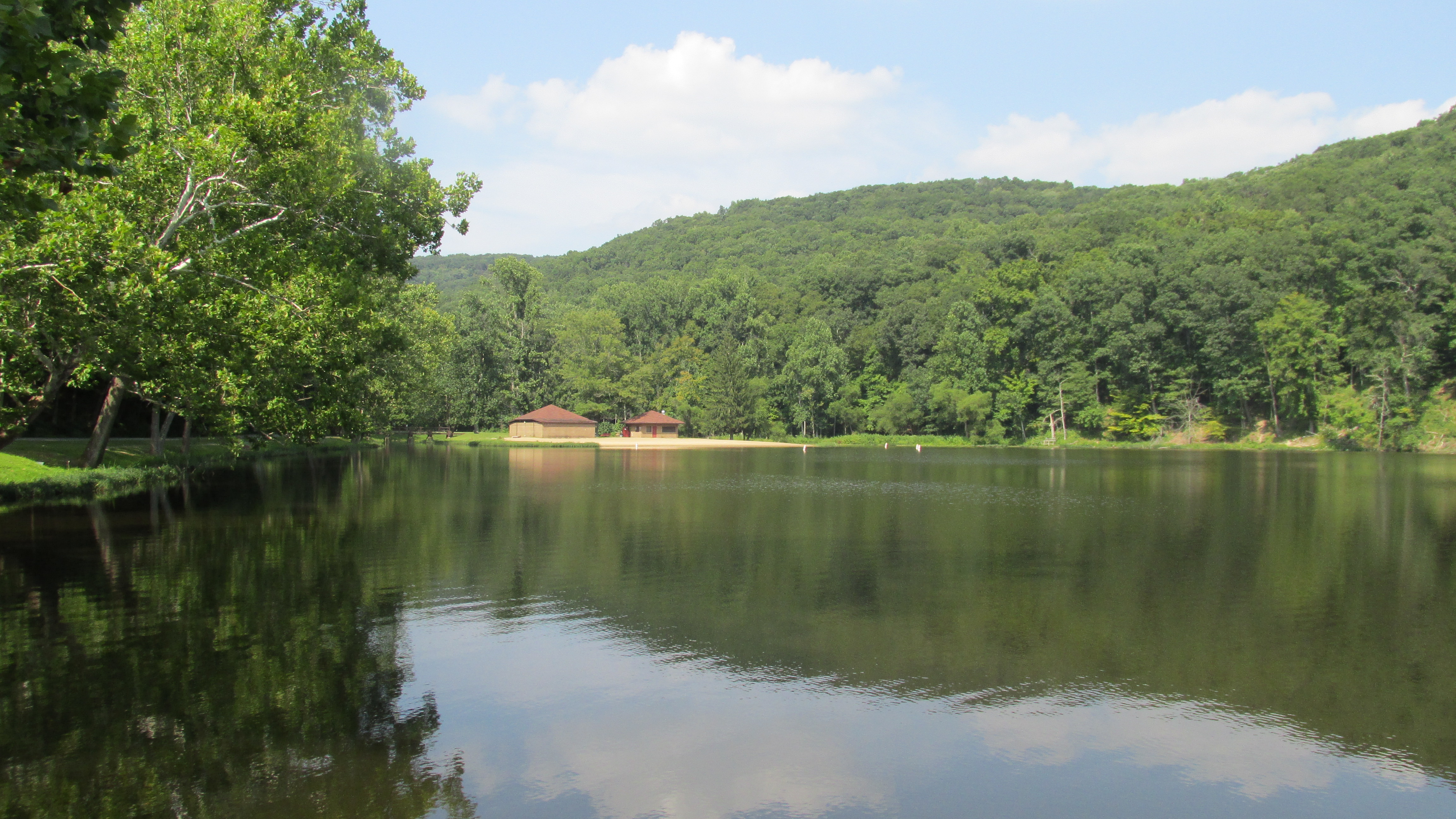
- Pike Lake

- Location within Ohio
- Location: Pike County, Ohio
- Coordinates: 39°09′38″N 83°13′11″W
- Basin countries: United States
- Surface area: 13 acres (5.3 ha)
- Surface elevation: 755 ft (230 m)

Pike Lake State Park is a public recreation area located in the midst of the wooded hills of Pike County, five miles south of the village of Bainbridge, in the southern part of the U.S. state of Ohio. The state park contains a small lake with surrounding state forest, campground, and cabins. The site was developed by members of the Civilian Conservation Corps in the 1930s and became a state park in 1949.
