= International Materials Reviews =

- Language: English

Publication details
- Former name(s): International Metals Reviews (1976–1986) International Metallurgical Reviews (1972–1975) Metallurgical Reviews (1956–1971)
- History: 1956–present
- Publisher: Taylor & Francis (United Kingdom)
- Impact factor: 19.559 (2020)

Standard abbreviations
- ISO 4: Int. Mater. Rev.

Indexing
- ISSN: 1743-2804

Links
- Journal homepage

International Materials Reviews is a peer-reviewed scientific journal by Maney Publishing.

== Abstracting and indexing ==
International Materials Reviews is abstracted and indexed the following bibliographic databases:

- Science Citation Index Expanded
- Scopus

According to the Journal Citation Reports, the journal has a 2020 impact factor of 19.559.
