= Bainbridge, Ross County, Ohio =

Bainbridge, Ohio
- Village
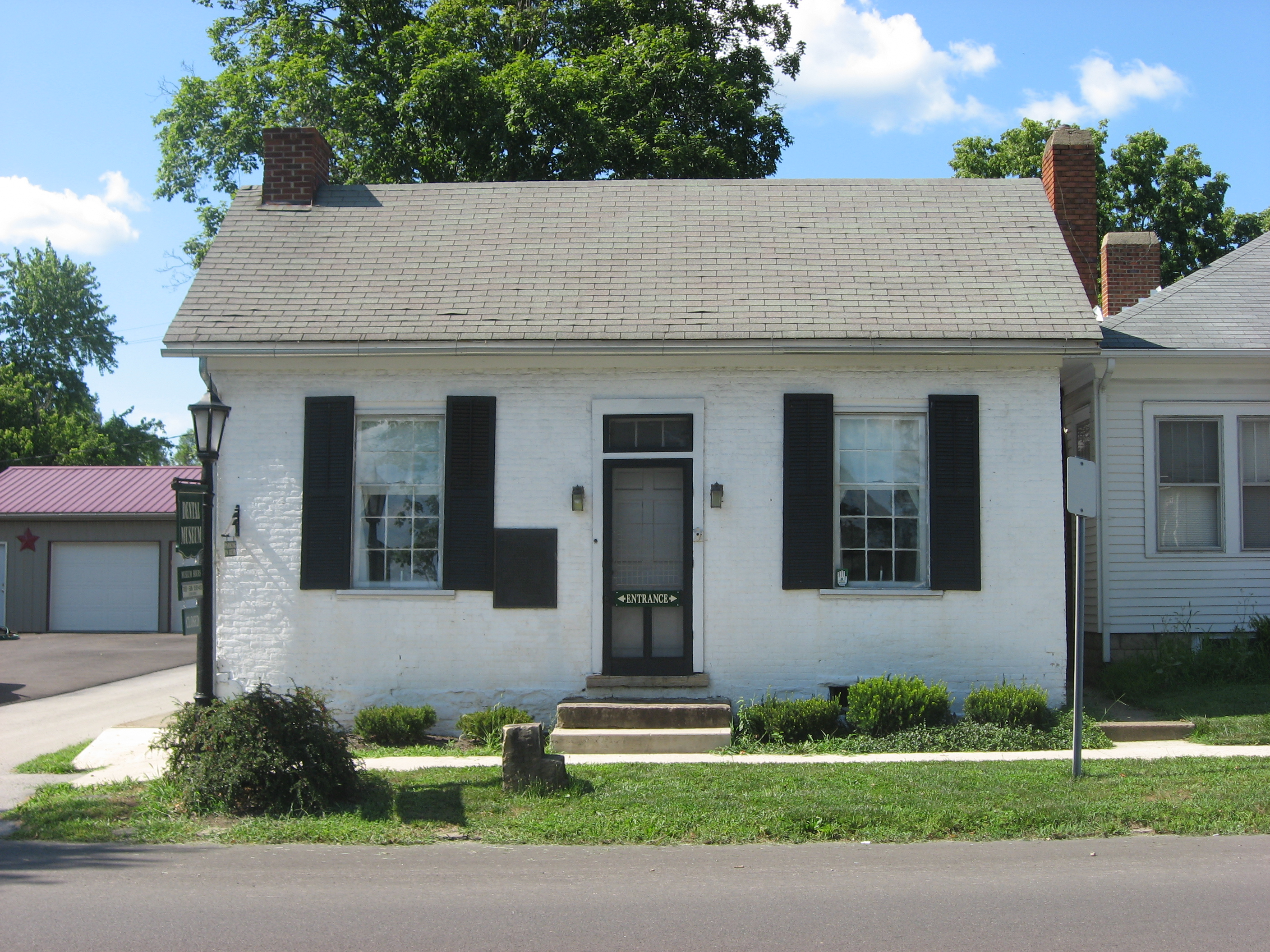
- The Harris Dental Museum, which once housed the first dental school in the United States.

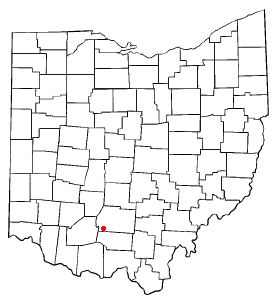
- Location of Bainbridge, Ross County, Ohio

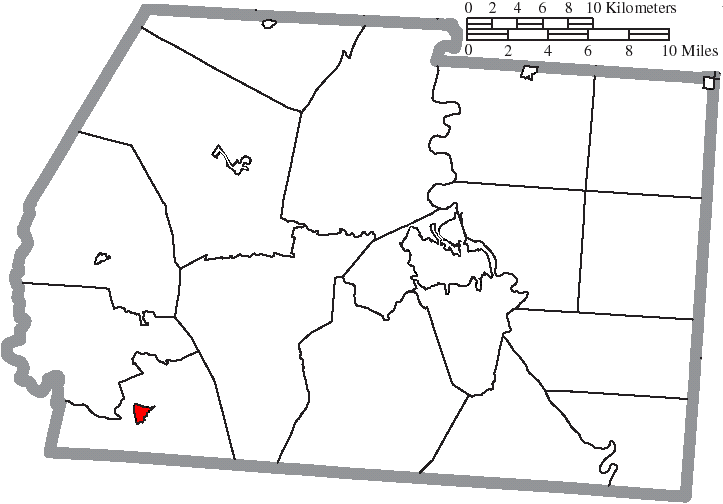
- Location of Bainbridge in Ross County
- Coordinates: 39°13′35″N 83°16′11″W
- Country: United States
- State: Ohio
- County: Ross

Area
  - Total: 0.51 sq mi (1.32 km^{2})
  - Land: 0.51 sq mi (1.32 km^{2})
  - Water: 0 sq mi (0.00 km^{2})
- Elevation: 735 ft (224 m)

Population (2020)
  - Total: 765
  - Estimate (2023): 753
  - Density: 1,503/sq mi (580.3/km^{2})
- Time zone: UTC-5 (Eastern (EST))
  - Summer (DST): UTC-4 (EDT)
- ZIP code: 45612
- Area code: 740
- FIPS code: 39-03604
- GNIS feature ID: 2398017
- Website: https://www.bainbridge45612.com/

Bainbridge is a village in Ross County, Ohio, United States, along Paint Creek. The population was 765 at the 2020 census.

Bainbridge is the location of Pike Lake State Park.

== Geography ==
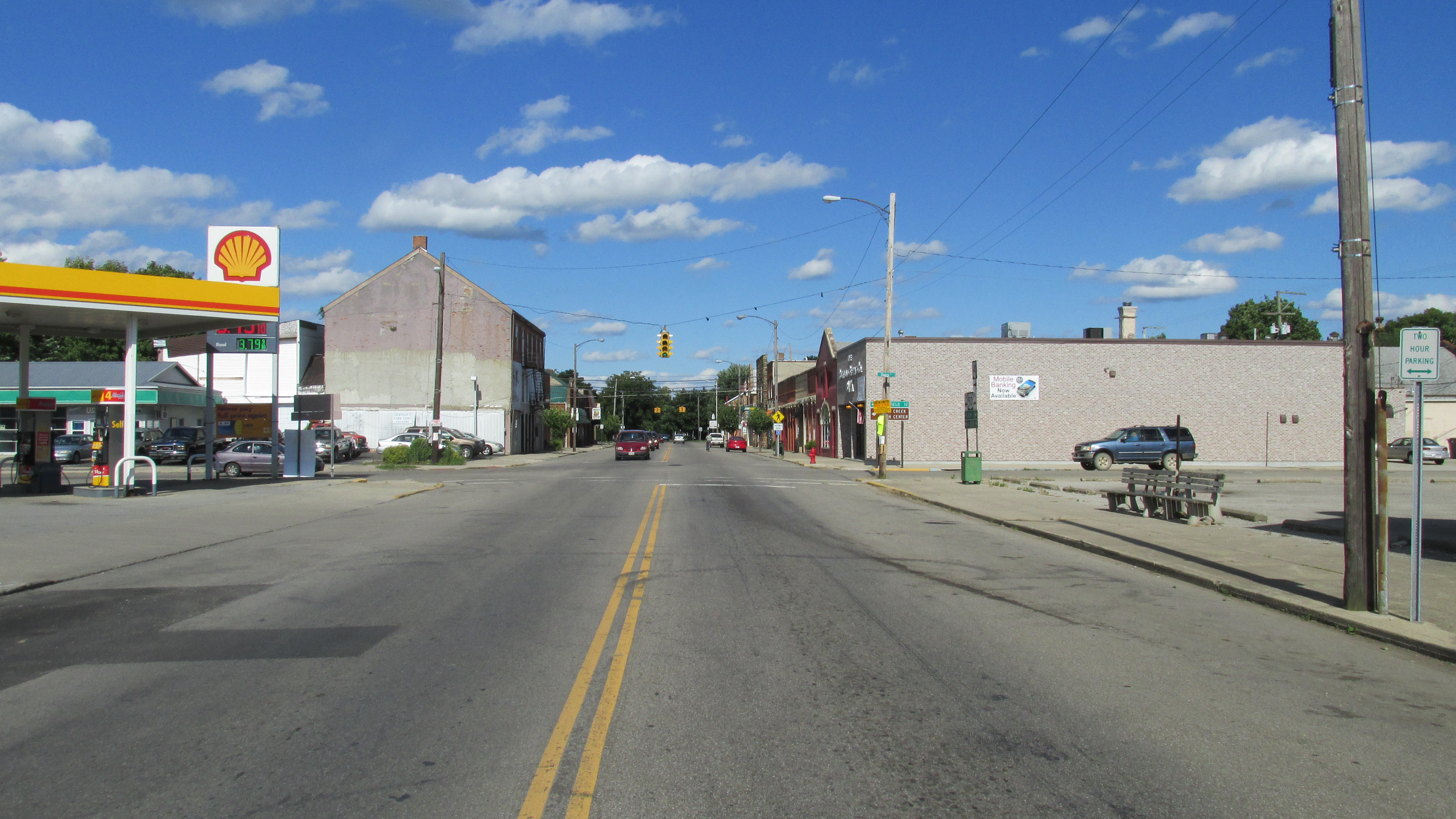
Looking east on Main Street (US Highway 50) in Bainbridge.

According to the United States Census Bureau, the village has a total area of 0.51 square miles (1.32 km^{2}), all land.

== Demographics ==
Historical population
Census	Pop.	Note	%±
1820	146		—
1830	279		91.1%
1840	300		7.5%
1850	626		108.7%
1860	679		8.5%
1870	647		−4.7%
1880	825		27.5%
1900	954		—
1910	883		−7.4%
1920	862		−2.4%
1930	735		−14.7%
1940	913		24.2%
1950	964		5.6%
1960	1,001		3.8%
1970	1,057		5.6%
1980	1,042		−1.4%
1990	968		−7.1%
2000	1,012		4.5%
2010	860		−15.0%
2020	765		−11.0%
2023 (est.)	753		−1.6%
U.S. Decennial Census

=== 2010 census ===
As of the census of 2010, there were 860 people, 357 households, and 228 families living in the village. The population density was 1,686.3 inhabitants per square mile (651.1/km^{2}). There were 394 housing units at an average density of 772.5 per square mile (298.3/km^{2}). The racial makeup of the village was 96.4% White, 0.8% African American, 0.2% Native American, and 2.6% from two or more races. Hispanic or Latino of any race were 0.6% of the population.

There were 357 households, of which 31.1% had children under the age of 18 living with them, 43.7% were married couples living together, 15.7% had a female householder with no husband present, 4.5% had a male householder with no wife present, and 36.1% were non-families. 30.5% of all households were made up of individuals, and 16.3% had someone living alone who was 65 years of age or older. The average household size was 2.36 and the average family size was 2.91.

The median age in the village was 43.2 years. 22.6% of residents were under the age of 18; 6.5% were between the ages of 18 and 24; 23.5% were from 25 to 44; 26.5% were from 45 to 64; and 20.9% were 65 years of age or older. The gender makeup of the village was 45.9% male and 54.1% female.

=== 2000 census ===
As of the census of 2000, there were 1,012 people, 397 households, and 277 families living in the village. The population density was 1,975.9 inhabitants per square mile (762.9/km^{2}). There were 451 housing units at an average density of 880.5 per square mile (340.0/km^{2}). The racial makeup of the village was 99.41% White, 0.20% African American, 0.10% Native American, 0.10% Asian, and 0.20% from two or more races. Hispanic or Latino of any race were 0.20% of the population. It is the hometown of medal of honor recipient Forrest E. Everhart

There were 397 households, out of which 35.0% had children under the age of 18 living with them, 48.6% were married couples living together, 17.4% had a female householder with no husband present, and 30.0% were non-families. 25.7% of all households were made up of individuals, and 13.6% had someone living alone who was 65 years of age or older. The average household size was 2.49 and the average family size was 2.95.

In the village, the population was spread out, with 26.8% under the age of 18, 8.6% from 18 to 24, 28.7% from 25 to 44, 19.2% from 45 to 64, and 16.8% who were 65 years of age or older. The median age was 36 years. For every 100 females there were 85.0 males. For every 100 females age 18 and over, there were 77.7 males.

The median income for a household in the village was $26,417, and the median income for a family was $31,645. Males had a median income of $32,000 versus $20,625 for females. The per capita income for the village was $14,905. About 17.0% of families and 19.9% of the population were below the poverty line, including 30.4% of those under age 18 and 16.0% of those age 65 or over.

== Education ==
It is in the Paint Valley Local School District. Bainbridge students attend high school at Paint Valley High School, which contains students from Bainbridge and Bourneville. The school mascot is the bearcat, and the teams play in the Scioto Valley Conference.

Bainbridge is also home of the first dental school in the United States. Opened by Dr. John M. Harris in 1825, the school is now a museum.

Bainbridge has a public library, a branch of the Chillicothe & Ross County Public Library.
