= National Register of Historic Places listings in Trumbull County, Ohio =

Location of Trumbull County in Ohio

This is a list of the National Register of Historic Places listings in Trumbull County, Ohio.

This is intended to be a complete list of the properties and districts on the National Register of Historic Places in Trumbull County, Ohio, United States. The locations of National Register properties and districts for which the latitude and longitude coordinates are included below, may be seen in an online map.

There are 40 properties and districts listed on the National Register in the county, including 1 National Historic Landmark. Another property was once listed but has been removed.

This National Park Service list is complete through NPS recent listings posted March 27, 2026.

== Current listings ==
	Name on the Register	Image	Date listed	Location	City or town	Description
1	Dr. Peter Allen House	Dr. Peter Allen House	September 3, 1971 (#71000653)	W. Williamsfield State Rd., north of its intersection with State Route 87, in Kinsman; 41°27′17″N 80°35′41″W	Kinsman Township	
2	Henry Barnhisel, II House	Henry Barnhisel, II House	December 19, 1982 (#82001492)	1011 N. State St. 41°09′52″N 80°42′19″W	Girard	
3	Brookfield Center Historic District	Brookfield Center Historic District	October 10, 1985 (#85002922)	Roughly the western side of State Route 7 from Sharon-Warren Rd. to N. Wood St. and Brookfield Village Green; 41°13′59″N 80°34′06″W	Brookfield Township	
4	Charles Brown Gothic Cottage	Charles Brown Gothic Cottage	May 28, 1975 (#75001545)	State Route 45, S. in North Bloomfield; 41°27′36″N 80°52′08″W	Bloomfield Township	
5	Brown-Wing House	Brown-Wing House	June 20, 1975 (#75001546)	Park West Rd. in North Bloomfield; 41°27′50″N 80°52′29″W	Bloomfield Township	
6	Brownwood	Brownwood	September 3, 1971 (#71000655)	State Route 45 in North Bloomfield; 41°27′39″N 80°51′21″W	Bloomfield Township	
7	Congregational-Presbyterian Church	Congregational-Presbyterian Church	September 3, 1971 (#71000654)	Near State Routes 5 and 7 in Kinsman; 41°26′56″N 80°35′21″W	Kinsman Township	
8	Clarence Darrow Octagon House	Clarence Darrow Octagon House	September 10, 1971 (#71001025)	State Routes 5 and 7 in Kinsman; 41°26′59″N 80°35′04″W	Kinsman Township	
9	Dunlap-Burnett-Moss House		January 30, 2023 (#100008444)	1499 Burnett St. (Twp. Hwy. 158); 41°08′48″N 80°45′58″W	Mineral Ridge	
10	East Market Street School		May 23, 2025 (#100011837)	585 East Market Street; 41°14′11″N 80°48′37″W	Warren	
11	John Stark Edwards House	John Stark Edwards House	July 17, 1978 (#78002199)	309 South St., SE. 41°14′03″N 80°49′00″W	Warren	Moved to 303 Monroe St. NW in 1986.
12	Fowler Center Historic District	Fowler Center Historic District	October 10, 1985 (#85002921)	Roughly the area around the Fowler Township Village Green at the junction of State Routes 193 and 305, in Fowler; 41°18′39″N 80°39′23″W	Fowler Township	
13	Richard Garlick House	Richard Garlick House	October 10, 1990 (#90001500)	1025 Ravine Dr., north of Youngstown; 41°08′49″N 80°38′36″W	Liberty Township	
14	Greene Township Center	Greene Township Center	March 8, 1978 (#78002198)	East of North Bloomfield on State Route 87 at Greene Center; 41°27′41″N 80°45′44″W	Greene Township	
15	Gustavus Center Historic District	Gustavus Center Historic District	August 6, 1975 (#75001542)	Town of Gustavus situated at the junction of State Routes 87 and 193; 41°27′42″N 80°39′56″W	Gustavus Township	
16	Charles Harshman House	Charles Harshman House	July 7, 1983 (#83002062)	3932 Painesville-Warren State Rd., NW. 41°19′35″N 80°56′39″W	Southington Township	Demolished per Google Street View.
17	Elam Jones Public House	Elam Jones Public House	January 8, 2003 (#02001687)	3365 State Route 7 in Hartford; 41°18′43″N 80°34′05″W	Hartford Township	
18	Mahoning Avenue Historic District	Mahoning Avenue Historic District	October 26, 1971 (#71000656)	241-391 Mahoning Ave., NW.; also Mahoning Ave. between Perkins Dr. and High St. 41°14′19″N 80°49′22″W	Warren	Second set of boundaries represents a boundary increase
19	John Wesley Mason Gothic Cottage	John Wesley Mason Gothic Cottage	November 12, 1975 (#75001541)	Northwest of Braceville on State Route 534; 41°14′49″N 80°58′33″W	Braceville Township	
20	Almon G. McCorkle House	Almon G. McCorkle House	March 10, 1982 (#82003659)	1180 Salt Springs Rd. 41°09′59″N 80°50′28″W	Lordstown	
21	McKinley Memorial	McKinley Memorial	October 31, 1975 (#75001544)	40 N. Main St. 41°10′51″N 80°45′58″W	Niles	Beaux-Arts memorial to President McKinley designed by McKim, Mead & White.
22	McLain-Gillmer House	McLain-Gillmer House	June 15, 1978 (#78002200)	720 Mahoning Ave., NW. 41°14′30″N 80°49′29″W	Warren	
23	Mesopotamia Village District	Mesopotamia Village District	December 24, 1974 (#74001635)	State Routes 87 and 534 at Mesopotamia; 41°27′37″N 80°57′16″W	Mesopotamia Township	
24	Newton Falls Covered Bridge	Newton Falls Covered Bridge	October 16, 1974 (#74001636)	Off State Route 534; 41°11′17″N 80°58′17″W	Newton Falls	
25	Newton Falls Downtown Historic District		July 15, 2025 (#100012005)	Broad Street, roughly bounded by Canal and Center Streets; 41°11′18″N 80°58′38″W	Newton Falls	
26	Newton Falls United Service Organization (USO) Center		February 14, 2018 (#100002124)	52 E. Quarry St. 41°11′03″N 80°58′30″W	Newton Falls	
27	Niles Masonic Temple	Niles Masonic Temple	April 12, 2006 (#06000274)	22 W. Church St. 41°10′55″N 80°45′58″W	Niles	
28	James Ward Packard House	James Ward Packard House	October 31, 1985 (#85003577)	319 Oak Knoll Ave., NE. 41°14′21″N 80°47′38″W	Warren	
29	Liberty G. Raymond Tavern and Barn	Liberty G. Raymond Tavern and Barn	June 20, 1975 (#75001543)	State Route 87 and Dennison-Ashtabula Rd. in Kenilworth; 41°27′44″N 80°44′18″W	Greene Township	
30	Dr. John W. Seely House	Dr. John W. Seely House	April 14, 1972 (#72001048)	2245 Niles-Cortland Rd., south of Howland Corners; 41°12′45″N 80°44′24″W	Howland Township	
31	Southington Township School	Southington Township School	February 4, 2011 (#10001214)	4432 State Route 305; 41°18′30″N 80°57′27″W	Southington Township	Originally listed as Chalker High School (10001214), renamed Southington Township School and boundary expanded (12000464) based on Ohio request to add adjacent elementary school.
32	Swift-Kinsman House	Swift-Kinsman House	March 22, 2016 (#16000114)	8426 State Rd. 41°27′02″N 80°35′27″W	Kinsman Township	
33	Trumbull County Courthouse	Trumbull County Courthouse	December 31, 1974 (#74001637)	160 High St., NW. 41°14′13″N 80°49′09″W	Warren	
34	Harriet Taylor Upton House	Harriet Taylor Upton House	October 5, 1992 (#92001884)	380 Mahoning Ave., NW. 41°14′22″N 80°49′21″W	Warren	
35	Ward-Thomas House	Ward-Thomas House	February 9, 1984 (#84003809)	503 Brown St. 41°10′26″N 80°45′53″W	Niles	
36	Warren Commercial Historic District	Warren Commercial Historic District	June 16, 1983 (#83002063)	Roughly bounded by Mahoning, Monroe, Franklin, and Pine Sts. 41°14′17″N 80°49′13″W	Warren	
37	Warren Public Library	Warren Public Library	March 20, 1973 (#73001543)	120 High St., NW. 41°14′15″N 80°49′06″W	Warren	
38	Wells-Clark-Strouss House	Wells-Clark-Strouss House	September 10, 1993 (#93000877)	50 Warner Rd. at Logan Rd., east of Churchill; 41°10′19″N 80°37′55″W	Liberty Township	
39	William Woodrow House	William Woodrow House	July 15, 1982 (#82003658)	138 Champion St., E., in Champion Heights; 41°17′28″N 80°50′44″W	Champion Township	
40	Youngstown Country Club		February 5, 2024 (#100009888)	1402 Country Club Drive; 41°08′36″N 80°37′57″W	Liberty Township	

== Former listing ==
	Name on the Register	Image	Date listed	Date removed	Location	City or town	Description
1	Augustus Elwell House		November 3, 1975 (#75001540)	April 1, 1980	Northwest of Braceville on State Route 82	Braceville	

== See also ==
- List of National Historic Landmarks in Ohio
- Listings in neighboring counties: Ashtabula, Crawford (PA), Geauga, Mahoning, Mercer (PA), Portage
- National Register of Historic Places listings in Ohio
