= Ohio State Route 193 =

State highway in northeastern Ohio, US

State Route 193

Route information
- Maintained by ODOT
- Length: 58.00 mi (93.34 km)
- Existed: by 1969–present

Major junctions
- South end: I-680 in Youngstown
- US 422 / SR 289 in Youngstown; I-80 in Churchill; US 322 in Wayne; US 6 in Cherry Valley; I-90 near North Kingsville; US 20 in North Kingsville
- North end: SR 531 in North Kingsville

Location
- Country: United States
- State: Ohio
- Counties: Mahoning, Trumbull, Ashtabula

Highway system
- Ohio State Highway System; Interstate; US; State; Scenic
← SR 192	→ SR 194
← I-90	→ SR 91

Ohio State Route 193 (SR 193, OH 193) is a north–south state highway in the northeastern portion of the U.S. state of Ohio. Its southern terminus is at an interchange with I-680 in Youngstown, and its northern terminus is at OH 531 in North Kingsville.

== Route description ==
Ohio Route 193 has a southern terminus at Interstate 680 in Youngstown, Ohio. It travels as a short freeway called the "Madison Avenue Expressway" connecting to US 422. It then intersects US 422 and leaves the freeway onto a residential two-way street. It continues north past Interstate 80 as a four lane rural road. It crosses OH 82.

== History ==
OH 193 was designated between 1967 and 1969 along a former portion of OH 170 from US 422 in Youngstown to its current northern terminus in North Kingsville. From US 422 to US 20 in North Kingsville, this route was the former OH 90 from 1926 to 1962. The former OH 90 was then extended north to OH 531 in 1940. Meanwhile, the freeway section of OH 193 between US 422 and its current southern terminus at I-680 was completed at around the same time that OH 193 was assigned.

A previous iteration of OH 193 existed between 1924 and 1940. The original OH 193 was routed from the Indiana state line 3 miles (4.8 km) west of Hicksville to Hicksville along the current alignment of OH 18. In 1940, the entire alignment became certified as OH 18.

== Junctions ==
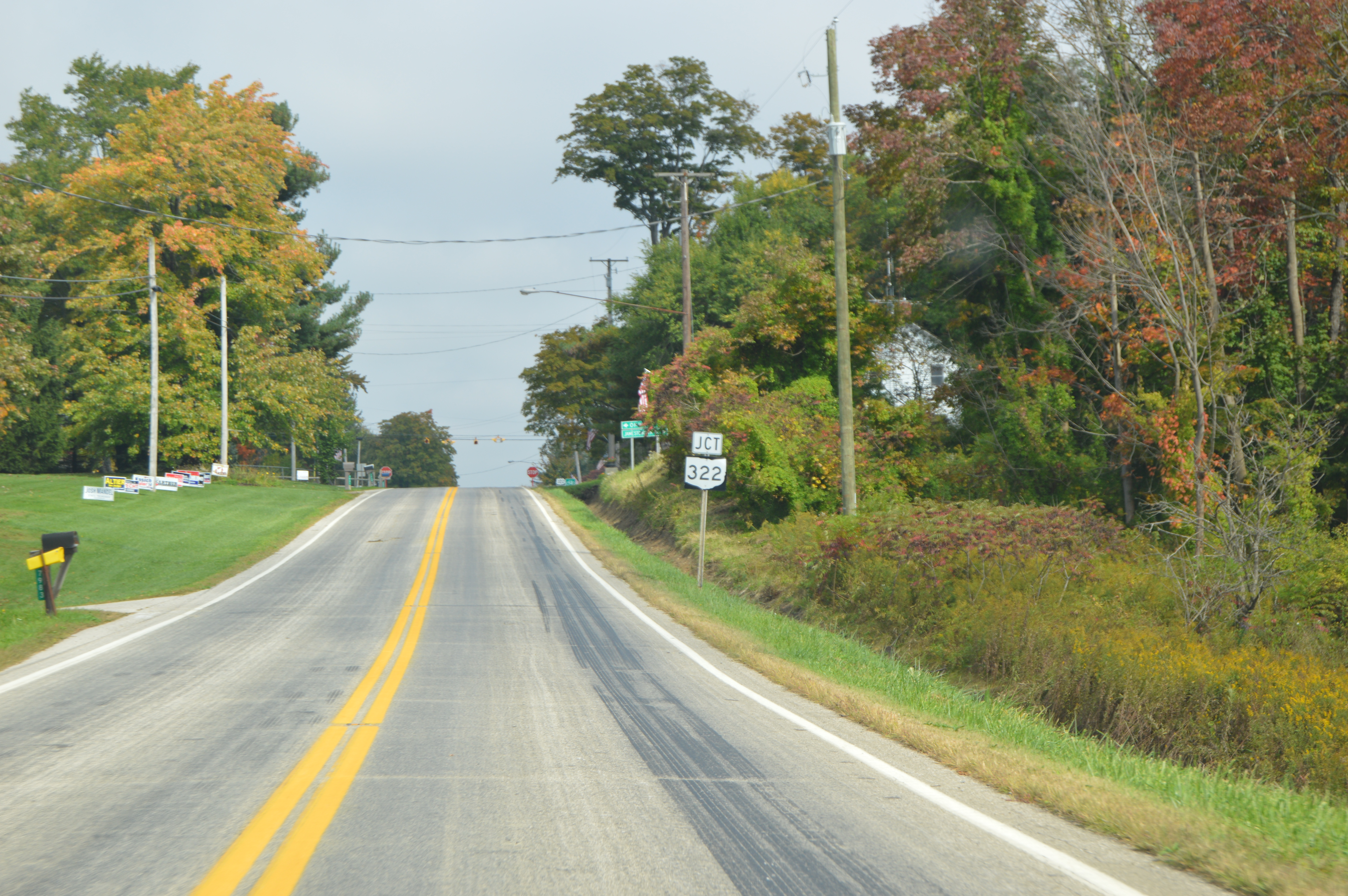
Entering Wayne Center from the south

County	Location	mi	km	Destinations	Notes
Mahoning	Youngstown	0.00	0.00	I-680 – Cleveland, Pittsburgh	Exit 4A (I-680); trumpet interchange
Mahoning	Youngstown	0.52	0.84	Crescent Street	Full-access interchange
Mahoning	Youngstown	0.99	1.59	US 422 / SR 289 east (Martin Luther King Boulevard/Wirt Street) – Girard, New Castle	Interchange; western terminus of SR 289
Mahoning	Youngstown			continues as grade-level highway; freeway continues as	
Trumbull	Liberty Township	4.07	6.55	I-80	Exit 229 (I-80)
Trumbull	Liberty Township	4.54	7.31	SR 304	
Trumbull	Vienna Township	9.25	14.89	SR 82	Interchange
Trumbull	Fowler Township	14.90	23.98	SR 305	
Trumbull	Johnston Township	20.37	32.78	SR 5 / SR 88	
Trumbull	Gustavus Township	25.46	40.97	SR 87	
Ashtabula	Wayne Township	30.48	49.05	US 322	
Ashtabula	Cherry Valley Township	35.46	57.07	US 6	
Ashtabula	Dorset Township	39.99	64.36	SR 307 west	Eastern terminus of SR 307
Ashtabula	Denmark Township	45.49	73.21	SR 167	
Ashtabula	Kingsville Township	54.44	87.61	SR 84	Southern end of SR 84 concurrency
Ashtabula	Kingsville Township	54.54	87.77	I-90	Exit 235 (I-90)
Ashtabula	Kingsville Township	55.29	88.98	SR 84	Northern end of SR 84 concurrency
Ashtabula	North Kingsville	56.69	91.23	US 20	
Ashtabula	North Kingsville	58.00	93.34	SR 531	
1.000 mi = 1.609 km; 1.000 km = 0.621 mi: Concurrency terminus
