= Badger High School (Ohio) =

Joseph Badger High School
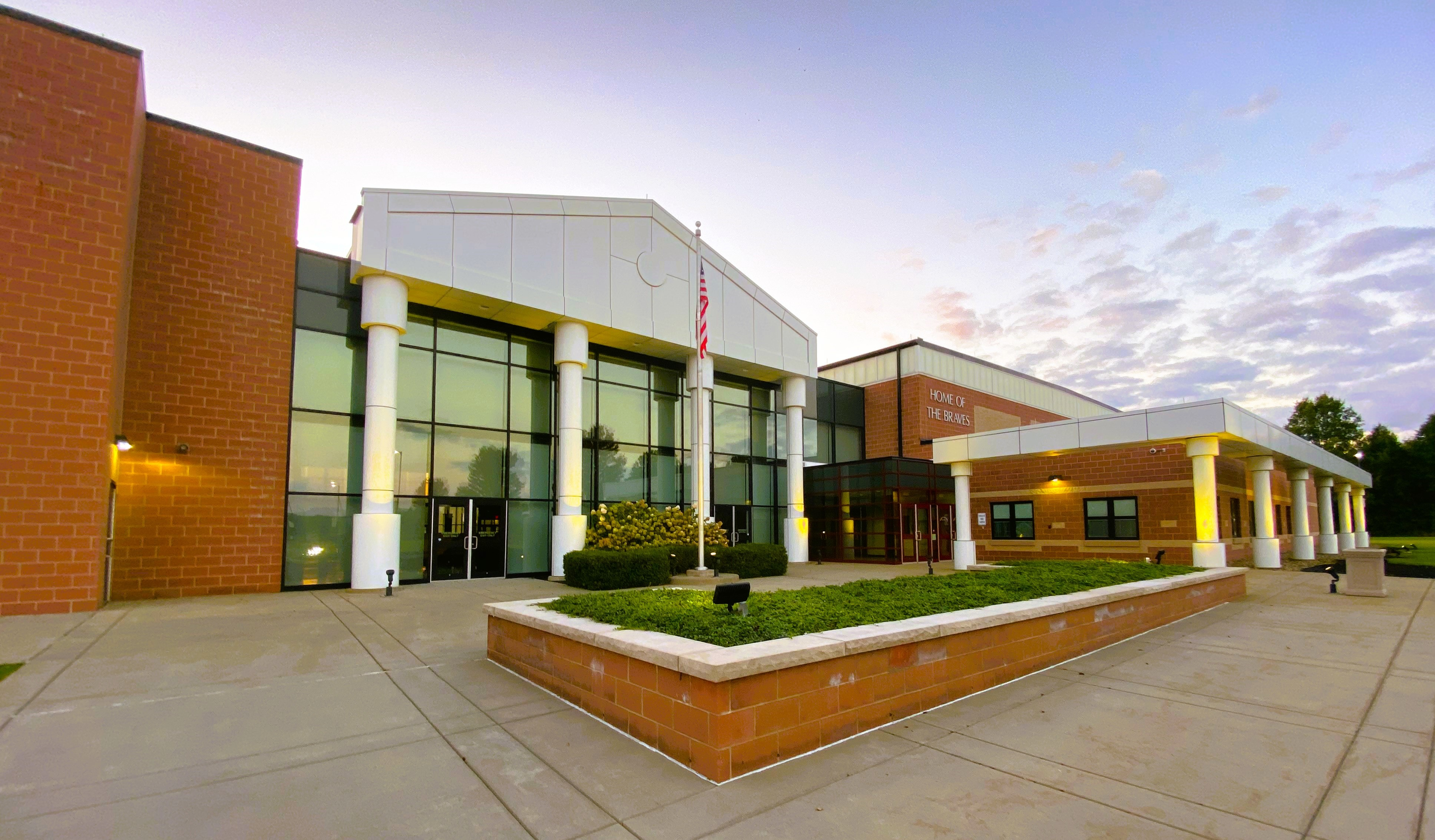
- "Home of the Braves"

Location
- 7119 State Route 7 Kinsman, Ohio 44428; United States
- Coordinates: 41°24′45″N 80°34′48″W

Information
- Type: Public, Coeducational high school
- School district: Joseph Badger Local School District
- NCES School ID: 390501703862
- Principal: William Hamilton
- Teaching staff: 10.80 (FTE)
- Grades: 9-12
- Enrollment: 144 (2024-25)
- Student to teacher ratio: 13.33
- Colors: Red and white
- Athletics conference: Northeastern Athletic Conference
- Team name: Braves
- Website: www.badgerbraves.org

Badger High School is a public high school in Kinsman, Ohio, Trumbull County, Ohio. It is the only high school in the Joseph Badger Local School District. Athletic teams are known as the Braves, and they compete as a member of the Ohio High School Athletic Association in the Northeastern Athletic Conference.

== History ==
Badger High School opened in the 1960, following the establishment of Joseph Badger School District, through the consolidation of several former township schools in Gustavus, Hartford, Kinsman and Vernon townships. The newly formed district was named in honor of Reverend Joseph Badger, a missionary and circuit-riding minister who served settlements throughout the Connecticut Western Reserve during the late 18th and 19th centuries.

The original Badger High School was closed following the 2005–2006 school year. In September 2006, the district opened their new K-12 campus along State Route 7. The $31.5 million facility replaced several older school buildings.

== Extracurriculars activities ==
Badger offers Art Club, Coronation Committee, French and Spanish Clubs, Prep Bowl, National Honors Society, Beta Club, and Yearbook Committees

== Athletics ==
Badger High School currently offers:

- Baseball
- Basketball
- Cheerleading
- Golf
- Softball
- Soccer
- Track and field
- Volleyball

=== State championships ===
- Softball – 1981, 1982

==== Associated Press poll winners ====
- Boys basketball – 1981

== Notable alumni ==
- Christopher Barzak - award-winning novelist and short story author
- Dave Blaney - professional NASCAR stock car racing driver
- Dale Blaney - former college basketball player
