= Ohio State Route 87 =

State highway in northeastern Ohio, US

State Route 87

Route information
- Maintained by ODOT
- Length: 60.39 mi (97.19 km)
- Existed: 1924–present

Major junctions
- West end: US 6 / US 20 / US 422 / SR 8 / SR 14 / SR 43 at Public Square in Cleveland
- I-77 / I-90 / SR 10 in Cleveland; I-77 in Cleveland; I-271 / US 422 in Beachwood; SR 11 in Greene Township
- East end: SR 5 / SR 7 in Kinsman Township

Location
- Country: United States
- State: Ohio
- Counties: Cuyahoga, Geauga, Trumbull

Highway system
- Ohio State Highway System; Interstate; US; State; Scenic
← SR 86	→ SR 88

State Route 87 (SR 87) is an east–west highway in northeastern Ohio, a U.S. state. Its western terminus is at Public Square in downtown Cleveland. It is one of 9 other routes to enter downtown Cleveland at Public Square. 87 ends at an intersection with SR 5 and SR 7 in Kinsman Township.

== Route description ==
SR 87 begins at Public Square in Cleveland, at an intersection with US 6 / US 42 / SR 3. It is concurrent with US 422 and SR 8 for just over 2 miles (3.2 km) (as well as SR 14 and SR 43 for a short segment), and then leaves the concurrency to occupy a section of Woodland Avenue. The route heads eastward and becomes Buckeye Road, and then Shaker Boulevard, which is a divided boulevard with RTA commuter rail tracks (the "Rapid") between the east- and westbound lanes as it travels through Shaker Heights.

At Richmond Road in Beachwood, SR 87 joins SR 175 from the north and heads south approximately 1-mile (1.6 km) to Chagrin Boulevard, where the route leaves SR 175 and joins US 422 east. A short distance later, at the I-271 interchange, US 422 leaves the concurrency southward, and SR 87 continues east on Chagrin Boulevard through Woodmere Village and Pepper Pike, and then on Pinetree Road and South Woodland Road, intersects SR 91 (SOM Center Road) and enters Moreland Hills.

SR 87 enters Geauga County and becomes Kinsman Road for most of its remaining length, and intersects SR 306 (Chillicothe Road), passes by Punderson State Park, and intersects SR 44 (Ravenna Road) at Newbury.

The route then enters Burton, where it temporarily becomes Center Street and intersects SR 168 (Cheshire Street); then through Ohio's second largest Amish community in Middlefield as High Street, the route intersects SR 608 (State Street).

Just east of Middlefield, the route resumes its Kinsman Road name, and intersects with SR 528 (Madison Road), before entering Trumbull County.

In Trumbull County, SR 87 intersects SR 534 at Mesopotamia, and then SR 45 at North Bloomfield. Next, it crosses SR 46, followed by its interchange with SR 11. Finally, it intersects SR 193 and reaches its terminus at the SR 5 / SR 7 concurrency in Kinsman Township.

== History ==
- Original state route; originally routed from Woodmere to Pennsylvania state line on its current alignment to Burton, State Route 168’s current alignment from Burton to Parkman, and along State Route 88’s current alignment from Parkman to the state line.
- 1926 – Western terminus moved to Cleveland along previously unnumbered roads.
- 1926 – Swapped alignments with State Route 168 east of Burton; old alignment from Parkman to state line was designated State Route 88.
- 1938 – Eastern terminus moved to its current location via previously unnumbered roads.

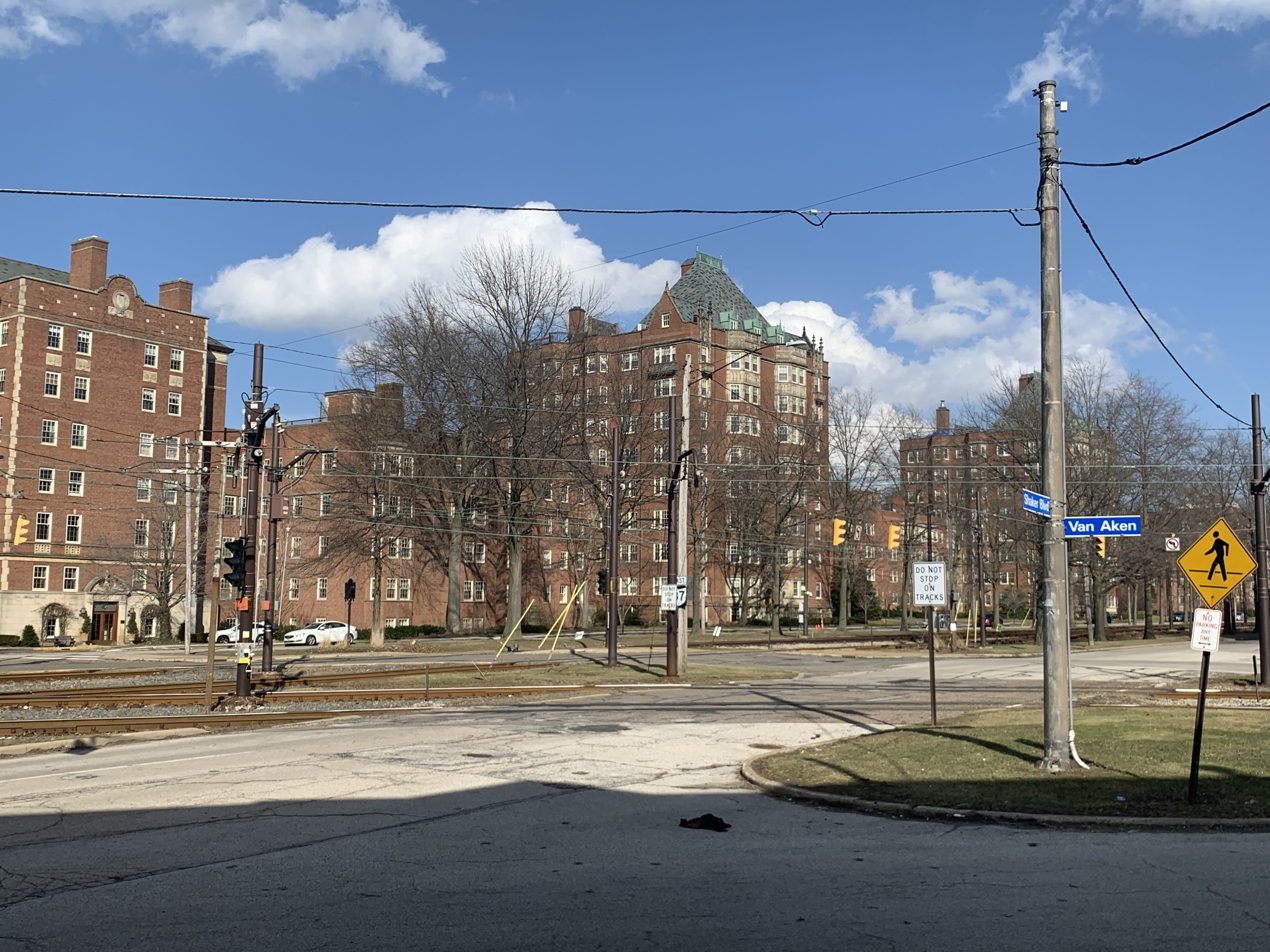
Route 87 at Van Aken Boulevard in Cleveland

== Major intersections ==
County	Location	mi	km	Destinations	Notes
Cuyahoga	Cleveland	0.00	0.00	US 6 / US 20 / US 422 east / SR 8 south / SR 14 east / SR 43 east (Public Square)	Termini of US 422, SR 8, SR 14, SR 43
Cuyahoga	Cleveland	0.58	0.93	SR 10 west (Lorain Avenue) / I-77 south / I-90 west to I-71 – Akron, Airport	Exit 162B on I-77; exits 171A-B on I-90
Cuyahoga	Cleveland	0.91	1.46	SR 14 east / SR 43 east (East 14th Street)	Eastern terminus of concurrency with SR 14 / SR 43
Cuyahoga	Cleveland	1.50– 1.68	2.41– 2.70	I-77 / SR 10 east to I-490 / I-71 / I-90 / East 30th Street – Akron	Exit 162A on I-77
Cuyahoga	Cleveland	2.42	3.89	SR 8 south / US 422 east (Kinsman Road) / East 55th Street	Eastern terminus of concurrency with OH 8 / US 422
Cuyahoga	Beachwood	10.58	17.03	SR 175 north (Richmond Road) / Shaker Boulevard east	Western terminus of concurrency with SR 175
Cuyahoga	Beachwood	11.51	18.52	SR 175 south (Richmond Road) / US 422 west (Chagrin Boulevard)	Eastern terminus of concurrency with SR 175; western terminus of concurrency with US 422
Cuyahoga	Beachwood	11.86	19.09	I-271 / US 422 east	Eastern terminus of concurrency with US 422; exit 29 on I-271
Cuyahoga	Pepper Pike	14.60	23.50	SR 91 (S.O.M. Center Road)	
Geauga	Russell Township	20.06	32.28	SR 306 (Chillicothe Road)	
Geauga	Newbury Township	27.88	44.87	SR 44 (Ravenna Road) – Chardon, Ravenna	
Geauga	Burton	30.40	48.92	SR 168 south / SR 700 south (Cheshire Street)	Northern terminus of SR 168 / SR 700
Geauga	Middlefield	34.41	55.38	SR 608 (State Road)	
Geauga	Middlefield	35.53	57.18	SR 528 (Madison Road)	
Trumbull	Mesopotamia Township	40.54	65.24	SR 534 (Wood Curtis Road)	
Trumbull	Bloomfield Township	45.09	72.57	SR 45	
Trumbull	Greene Township	51.45	82.80	SR 46	
Trumbull	Greene–Gustavus township line	53.20	85.62	SR 11 – Ashtabula, Youngstown	Exit 68 on SR 11
Trumbull	Gustavus Township	55.68	89.61	SR 193 (Youngstown Kingsville Road)	
Trumbull	Kinsman Township	60.39	97.19	SR 5 / SR 7 (Main Street)	
1.000 mi = 1.609 km; 1.000 km = 0.621 mi: Concurrency terminus; Incomplete access
