= Joseph Badger Local School District =

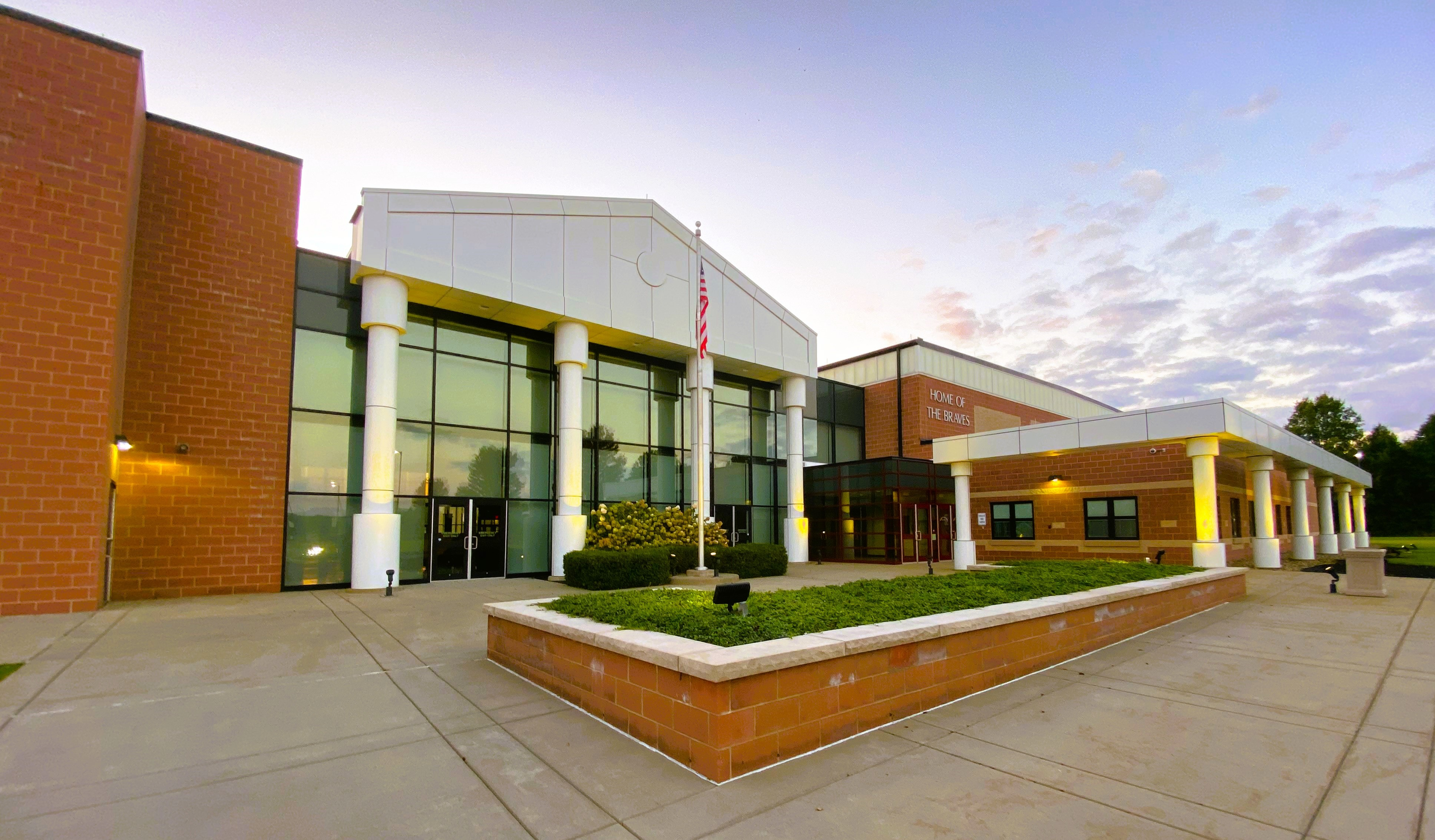
- "Home of the Braves"

Location
- 7119 State Route 7 Kinsman, Ohio 44428; United States
- Coordinates: 41°24′45″N 80°34′48″W

Information
- Type: Public, Coeducational
- NCES District ID: 3905017
- Superintendent: Edwin Baldwin
- Teaching staff: 33.12 (FTE)
- Grades: PK-12
- Enrollment: 562 (2024-25)
- Student to teacher ratio: 16.97
- Colors: Red and White
- Team name: Braves
- Website: www.badgerbraves.org

The Joseph Badger Local School District is a school district located in Kinsman Township, Trumbull County, Ohio, United States. the district serves one high school, one middle school and on elementary school.

== History ==
The Joseph Badger Local School District began on September 2, 1960, with the consolidation of four separate K-12 township schools, Gustavus, Hartford, Kinsman and Vernon. The district was named after Reverend Joseph Badger, a circuit-riding minister and early missionary in the Western Reserve region

In September 2006, the new K-12 Joseph Badger campus was built. The project costed $31.5 million.

== Schools ==
=== High School ===
- Badger High School

=== Middle School ===
- Badger Middle School

=== Elementary School ===
- Badger Elementary School
