= West Andover, Ohio =

- Unincorporated community
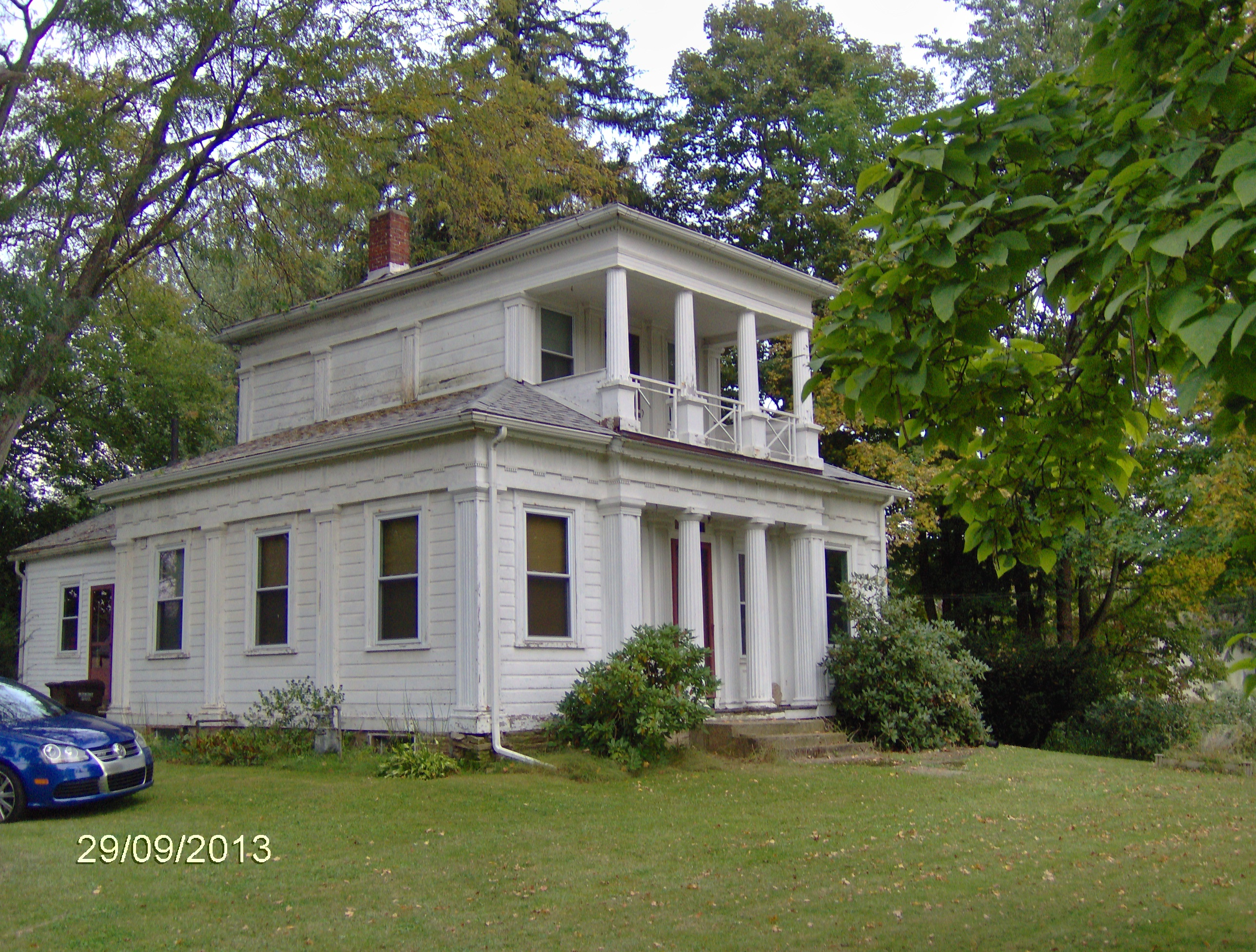
- John Henderson House

- Location within Ohio
- Coordinates: 41°36′26″N 80°36′43″W
- Country: United States
- State: Ohio
- County: Ashtabula
- Township: Andover
- Elevation: 1,056 ft (322 m)
- Time zone: UTC-5 (Eastern (EST))
  - Summer (DST): UTC-4 (EDT)
- ZIP code: 44003 (Andover)
- Area code(s): 440 & 436
- GNIS feature ID: 1047728

West Andover is an unincorporated community in Andover Township, Ashtabula County, Ohio, United States.

== History ==
West Andover was the first location in Andover Township to be permanently settled by white men. In 1805 or 1806, Epaphras Lyman of New Hartford, Connecticut was the first to attempt to settle in what is now Andover.

In 1859, West Andover briefly served as headquarters for John Brown’s abolitionist campaign. John Brown's secretary of war, John Henry Kagi, and several associates brought rifles and other supplies to the community, storing them at King & Brother's cabinet manufactory in nearby Cherry Valley. This repurposed West Andover as a staging ground for preparations leading up to the raid on Harpers Ferry. After the failed raid, several fugitives connected to John Brown's force passed through the area, including Merriam of Boston and Owen Brown, John Brown's son. Local residents sheltered them and offered assistance. Concern grew that federal authorities might attempt to arrest Owen Brown and others hiding in the region. In response, citizens of West Andover organized a defensive association, pledging to protect the fugitives. They established signals, passwords, and rendezvous points, and secured arms to resist capture if necessary.

== Geography ==
=== Major highways ===
- US 6
