= Vernon Township, Trumbull County, Ohio =

Township in Ohio, US

- Township
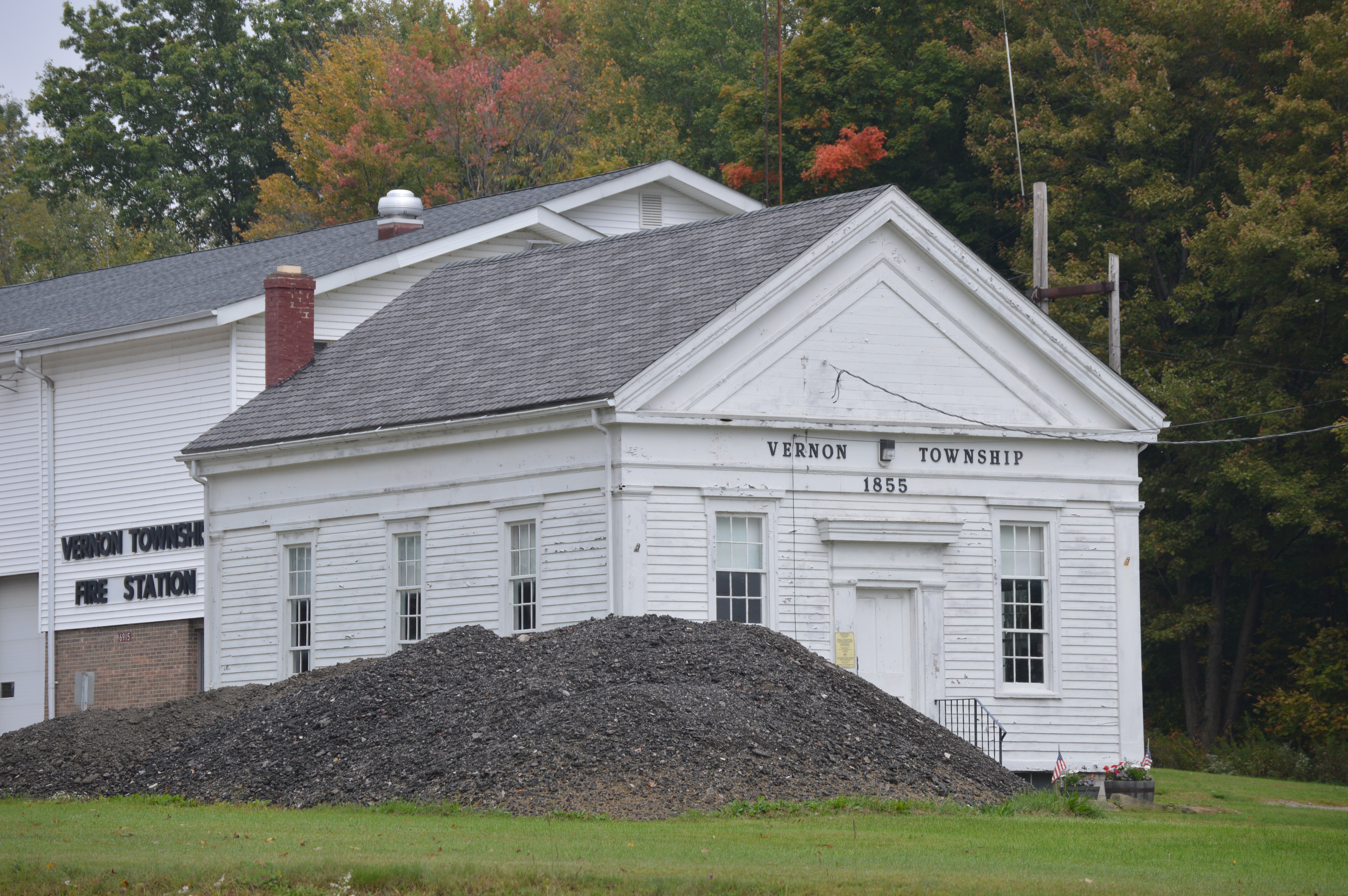
- Township hall at Vernon Center

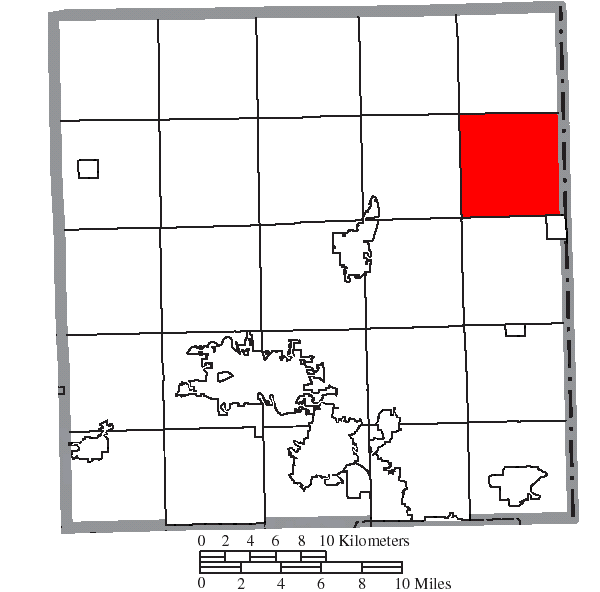
- Location of Vernon Township in Trumbull County
- Coordinates: 41°23′14″N 80°34′6″W
- Country: United States
- State: Ohio
- County: Trumbull

Area
  - Total: 26.3 sq mi (68.1 km^{2})
  - Land: 23.6 sq mi (61.2 km^{2})
  - Water: 2.7 sq mi (6.9 km^{2})
- Elevation: 1,014 ft (309 m)

Population (2020)
  - Total: 1,337
  - Density: 56/sq mi (21.8/km^{2})
- Time zone: UTC-5 (Eastern (EST))
  - Summer (DST): UTC-4 (EDT)
- ZIP code: 44428
- Area codes: 234/330
- FIPS code: 39-79856
- GNIS feature ID: 1087044

Vernon Township is one of the twenty-four townships of Trumbull County, Ohio, United States. The 2020 census found 1,337 people in the township.

== Geography ==
Located in the northeastern part of the county, it borders the following townships:

- Hartford Township - south
- Kinsman Township - north
- West Salem Township, Mercer County, Pennsylvania - east
- South Pymatuning Township, Mercer County, Pennsylvania - southeast
- Fowler Township - southwest corner
- Johnston Township - west
- Gustavus Township - northwest corner

No municipalities are located in Vernon Township, although the unincorporated community of Burghill lies in the southern part of the township.

== Name and history ==
Vernon Township was established in 1806, taking its name from Vernon, Connecticut. Statewide, other Vernon Townships are located in Clinton and Crawford counties.

== Government ==
The township is governed by a three-member board of trustees, who are elected in November of odd-numbered years to a four-year term beginning on the following January 1. Two are elected in the year after the presidential election and one is elected in the year before it. There is also an elected township fiscal officer, who serves a four-year term beginning on April 1 of the year after the election, which is held in November of the year before the presidential election. Vacancies in the fiscal officership or on the board of trustees are filled by the remaining trustees.
