= Cherry Valley, Ohio =

- Unincorporated community
- Location within Ohio
- Coordinates: 41°36′24″N 80°40′02″W
- Country: United States
- State: Ohio
- County: Ashtabula
- Township: Cherry Valley
- Elevation: 1,047 ft (319 m)
- Time zone: UTC-5 (Eastern (EST))
  - Summer (DST): UTC-4 (EDT)
- ZIP code: 44003 (Andover); 44032 (Dorset)
- Area code(s): 440 & 436
- GNIS feature ID: 1056796

Cherry Valley is an unincorporated community in the center of Cherry Valley Township, Ashtabula County, Ohio, United States.

== History ==
Cherry Valley was named after Cherry Valley, New York. The name was suggested by Josiah Creery, a settler from Richfield, New York, a settlement near the namesake.

This was the birth place of June Rose Colby (1856–1941), emeritus professor of literature at Illinois State University.

== Geography ==
=== Major highways ===
- US 6
- SR 193
