= Mecca Township, Trumbull County, Ohio =

Township in Ohio, US

- Township
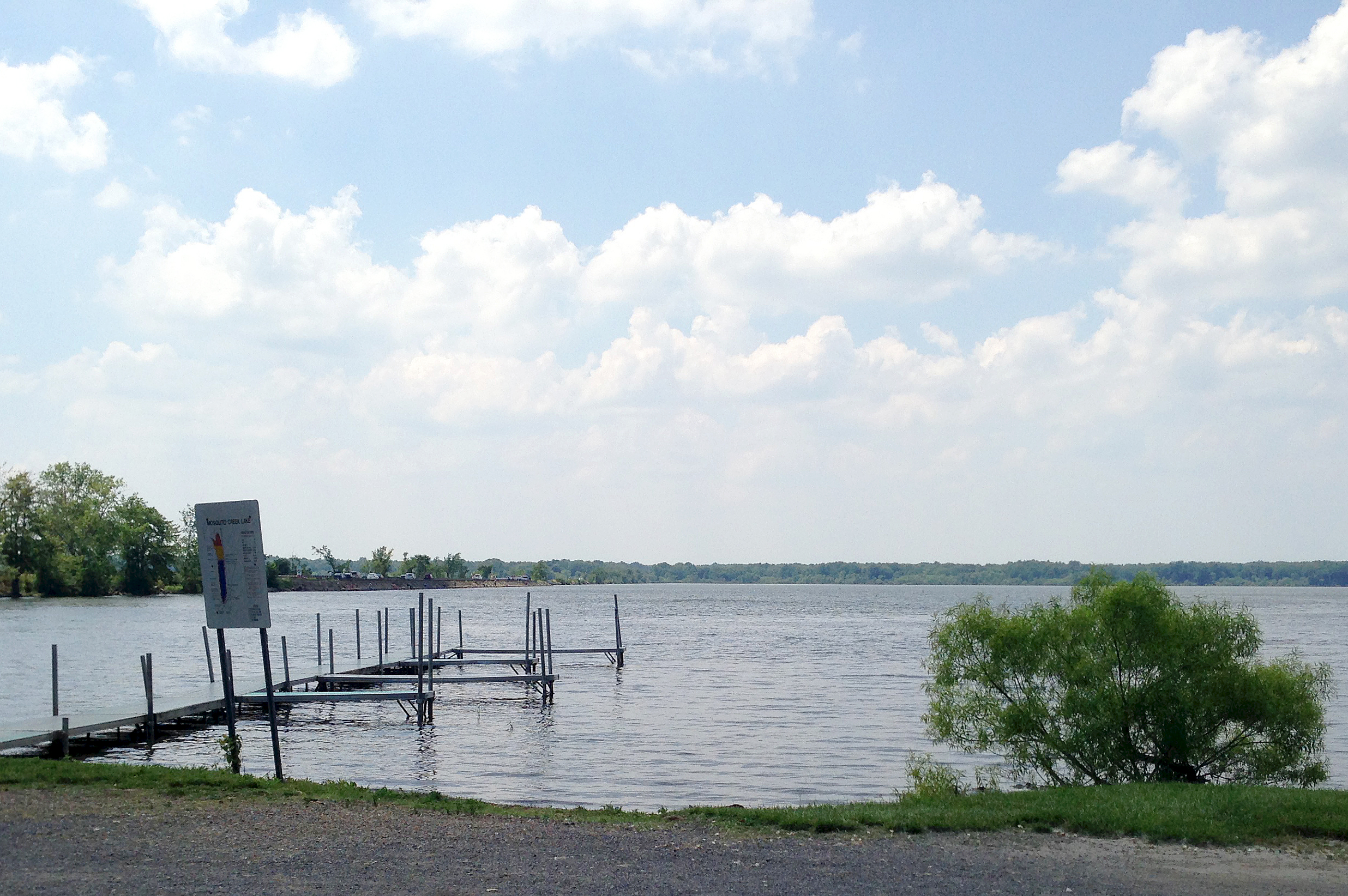
- Mosquito Lake just west of Mecca Center

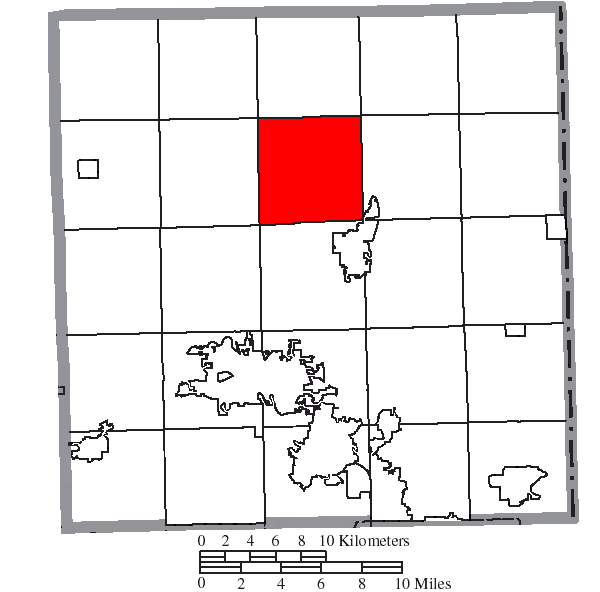
- Location of Mecca Township in Trumbull County
- Coordinates: 41°23′25″N 80°44′18″W
- Country: United States
- State: Ohio
- County: Trumbull

Area
  - Total: 26.8 sq mi (69.3 km^{2})
  - Land: 20.2 sq mi (52.4 km^{2})
  - Water: 6.5 sq mi (16.8 km^{2})
- Elevation: 958 ft (292 m)

Population (2020)
  - Total: 2,319
  - Density: 115/sq mi (44.3/km^{2})
- Time zone: UTC-5 (Eastern (EST))
  - Summer (DST): UTC-4 (EDT)
- ZIP code: 44410
- Area codes: 234/330
- FIPS code: 39-48678
- GNIS feature ID: 1087039

Mecca Township is one of the twenty-four townships of Trumbull County, Ohio, United States. The 2020 census found 2,319 people in the township.

== Geography ==
Located in the northern part of the county, it borders the following townships:

- Greene Township – north
- Gustavus Township – northeast corner
- Johnston Township – east
- Fowler Township – southeast corner
- Bazetta Township – south
- Champion Township – southwest corner
- Bristol Township – west
- Bloomfield Township – northwest corner

No municipalities are located in Mecca Township.

== Name and history ==
Mecca Township was established in 1821. The township derives its name from Mecca, in Saudi Arabia. It is the only Mecca Township statewide.

The history of drilling for oil in southwestern Mecca Township, beginning in the 1860s, was recorded in an article in a postal history magazine in 2000. The article was illustrated by maps of the area, by an envelope mailed from the Oil Diggins post office in May 1866, and by a photograph of the "Diggins" restaurant in West Mecca, stated to be "the only building standing as a reminder of the town of Oil Diggins".

== Government ==
The township is governed by a three-member board of trustees, who are elected in November of odd-numbered years to a four-year term beginning on the following January 1. Two are elected in the year after the presidential election and one is elected in the year before it. There is also an elected township fiscal officer, who serves a four-year term beginning on April 1 of the year after the election, which is held in November of the year before the presidential election. Vacancies in the fiscal officership or on the board of trustees are filled by the remaining trustees.
