= Colebrook Township, Ashtabula County, Ohio =

Township in Ohio, US

- Township
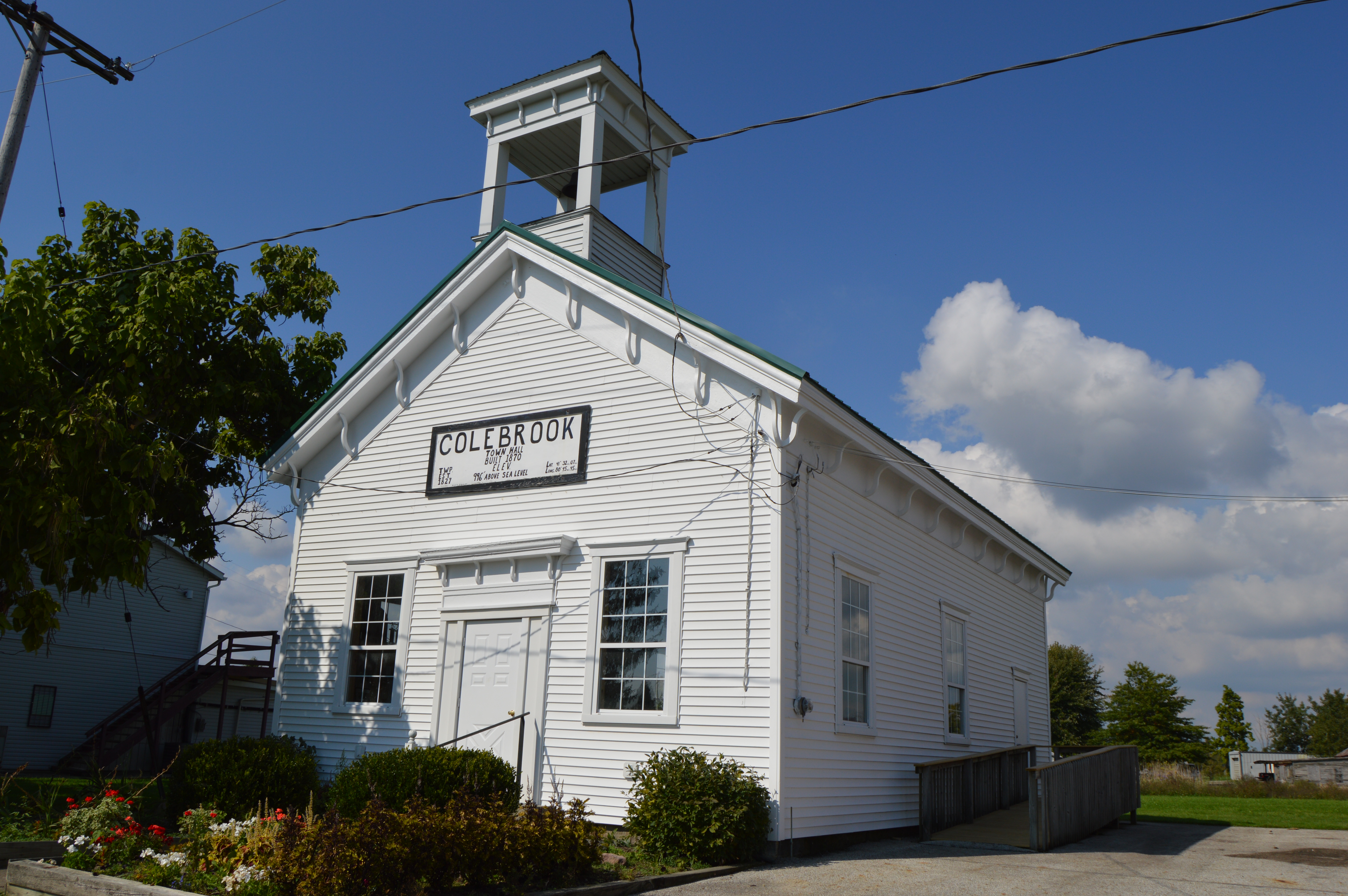
- Town hall at Colebrook Center

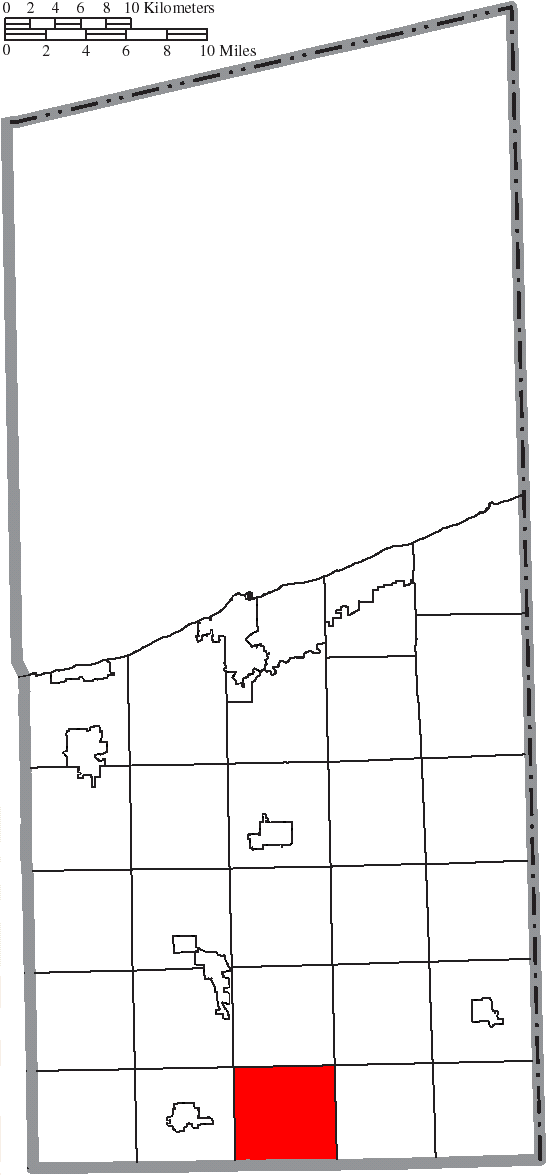
- Location of Colebrook Township in Ashtabula County
- Coordinates: 41°32′10″N 80°45′44″W
- Country: United States
- State: Ohio
- County: Ashtabula

Area
  - Total: 24.6 sq mi (63.8 km^{2})
  - Land: 24.5 sq mi (63.5 km^{2})
  - Water: 0.12 sq mi (0.3 km^{2})
- Elevation: 1,010 ft (308 m)

Population (2020)
  - Total: 1,115
  - Density: 41/sq mi (15.7/km^{2})
- Time zone: UTC-5 (Eastern (EST))
  - Summer (DST): UTC-4 (EDT)
- FIPS code: 39-16560
- GNIS feature ID: 1085722

Historical population
Census	Pop.	Note	%±
1990	747		—
2000	887		18.7%
2010	994		12.1%
2020	1,115		12.2%
2024 (est.)	1,149		3.0%
U.S. Census:

Colebrook Township is one of the twenty-seven townships of Ashtabula County, Ohio, United States. The 2020 census found 1,115 people in the township.

== Geography ==
Located on the southern edge of the county, it borders the following townships:

- New Lyme Township - north
- Cherry Valley Township - northeast corner
- Wayne Township - east
- Gustavus Township, Trumbull County - southeast corner
- Greene Township, Trumbull County - south
- Bloomfield Township, Trumbull County - southwest corner
- Orwell Township - west
- Rome Township - northwest corner

No municipalities are located in Colebrook Township.

== Name and history ==
It is the only Colebrook Township statewide.

The first settler in the township was Joel Blakeslee, who arrived from New York in 1819.

== Government ==
The township is governed by a three-member board of trustees, who are elected in November of odd-numbered years to a four-year term beginning on the following January 1. Two are elected in the year after the presidential election and one is elected in the year before it. There is also an elected township fiscal officer, who serves a four-year term beginning on April 1 of the year after the election, which is held in November of the year before the presidential election. Vacancies in the fiscal officership or on the board of trustees are filled by the remaining trustees. Currently, the board is composed of chairman James Vins, Jr. and members Ron Chutas and Joseph Yuhasz.
