= Andover Township, Ohio =

Township in Ohio, US

Andover Township, Ashtabula County, Ohio
- Township
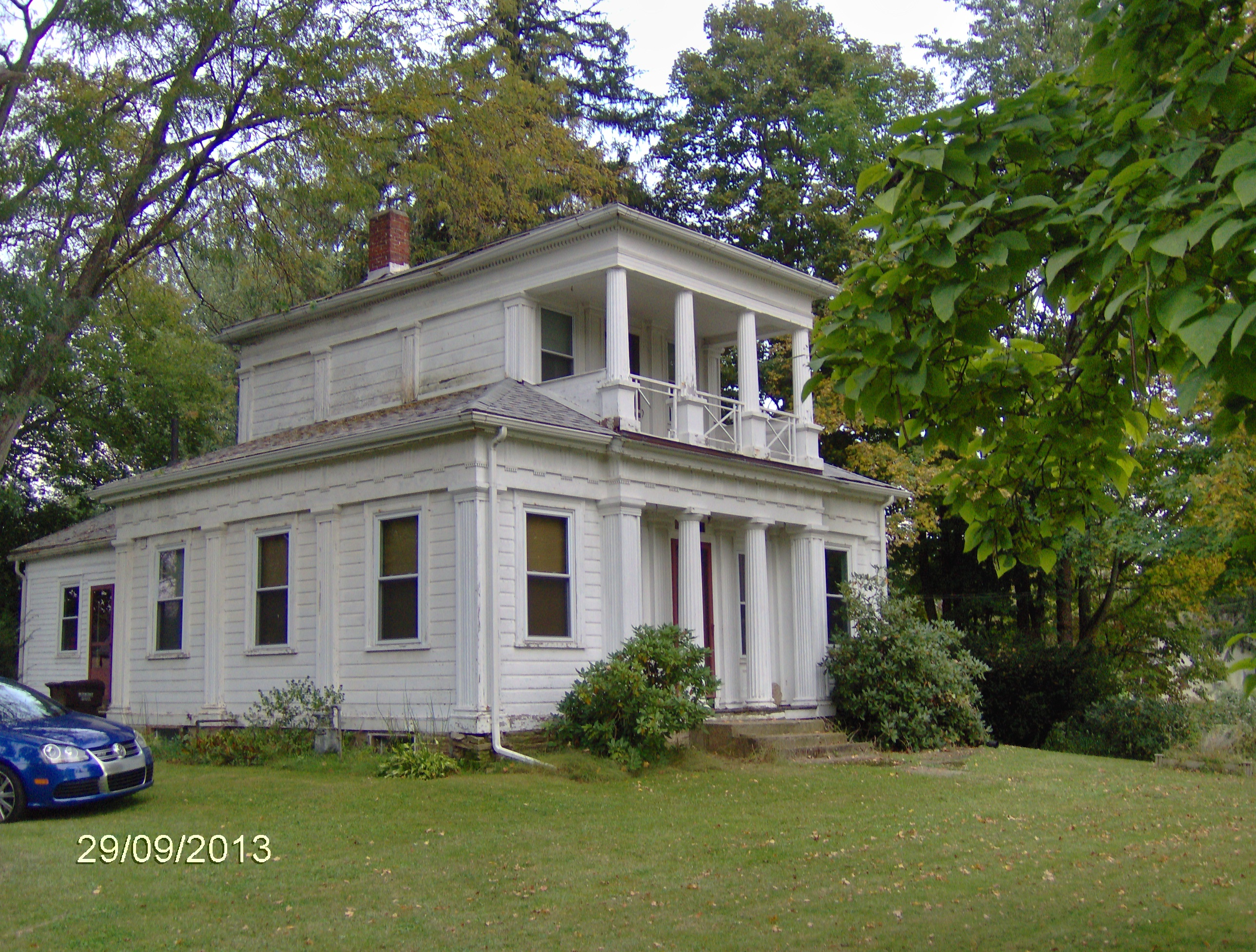
- John Henderson House in West Andover

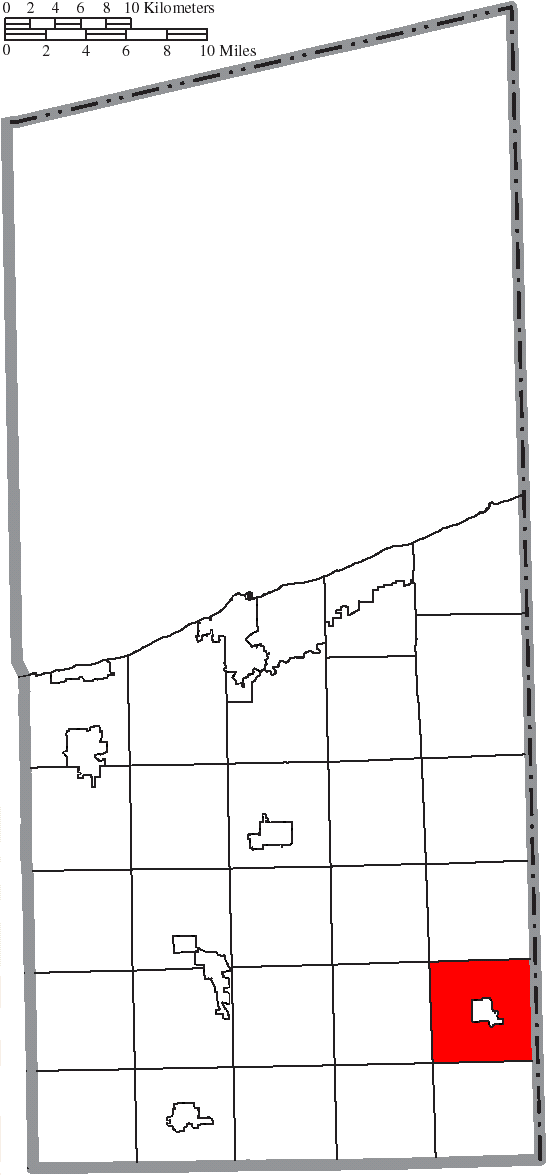
- Location of Andover Township in Ashtabula County
- Coordinates: 41°36′54″N 80°33′11″W
- Country: United States
- State: Ohio
- County: Ashtabula

Area
  - Total: 26.3 sq mi (68.2 km^{2})
  - Land: 22.2 sq mi (57.5 km^{2})
  - Water: 4.1 sq mi (10.7 km^{2})
- Elevation: 1,080 ft (330 m)

Population (2020)
  - Total: 2,577
  - Density: 124/sq mi (47.9/km^{2})
- Time zone: UTC-5 (Eastern (EST))
  - Summer (DST): UTC-4 (EDT)
- ZIP code: 44003
- Area code: 440
- FIPS code: 39-02064
- GNIS feature ID: 1085718

Andover Township is one of the twenty-seven townships of Ashtabula County, Ohio, United States. The population was 2,577 at the 2020 census.

== Geography ==
The village of Andover, as well as the unincorporated community of West Andover, lie within central and western Andover Township respectively.

Located on the southeastern edge of the county, it borders the following townships:

- Richmond Township - north
- North Shenango Township, Pennsylvania - east
- South Shenango Township, Pennsylvania - southeast
- Williamsfield Township - south
- Wayne Township - southwest corner
- Cherry Valley Township - west
- Dorset Township - northwest corner

=== Major highways ===
- US 6
- SR 7
- SR 85

== Name and history ==
It is the only Andover Township statewide.

== Government ==
The township is governed by a three-member board of trustees, who are elected in November of odd-numbered years to a four-year term beginning on the following January 1. Two are elected in the year after the presidential election and one is elected in the year before it. There is also an elected township fiscal officer, who serves a four-year term beginning on April 1 of the year after the election, which is held in November of the year before the presidential election. Vacancies in the fiscal officership or on the board of trustees are filled by the remaining trustees. Currently, the board is composed of chairman William French and members William Groff and Andrew Kirby, Fiscal Officer Karen Chapman.
