= Burghill, Ohio =

Unincorporated community in Ohio, U.S.

Coordinates: 41°21′34″N 80°34′06″W

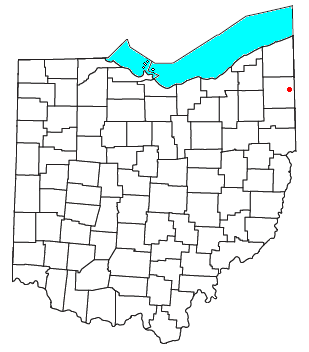
Location of Burghill, Ohio

High-speed, slow-motion video of lightning in Burghill, Ohio, on July 3, 2012 (captured by Nathan Boor in an Aimed Research).

Burghill is an unincorporated community in southern Vernon Township, Trumbull County, Ohio, United States. It is unincorporated although it had a post office, with the ZIP code of 44404 until 2011. It lies along State Route 7 north of Hubbard. The community is part of the Youngstown–Warren–Boardman, OH-PA Metropolitan Statistical Area.

The community was so named on account of its lofty elevation.
