= Leon, Monroe County, Wisconsin =

Town of Leon
- Town
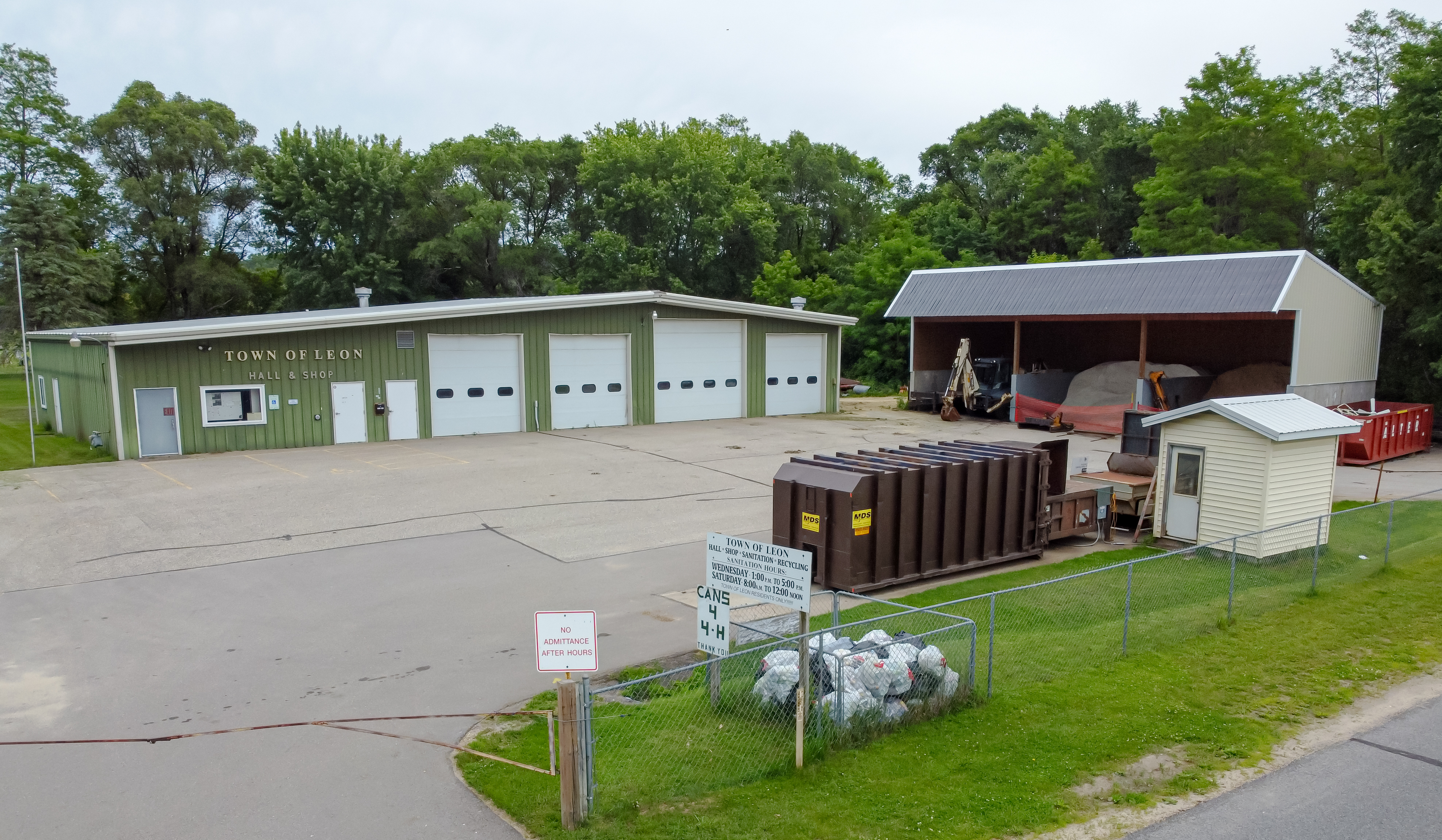
- Leon Town Hall

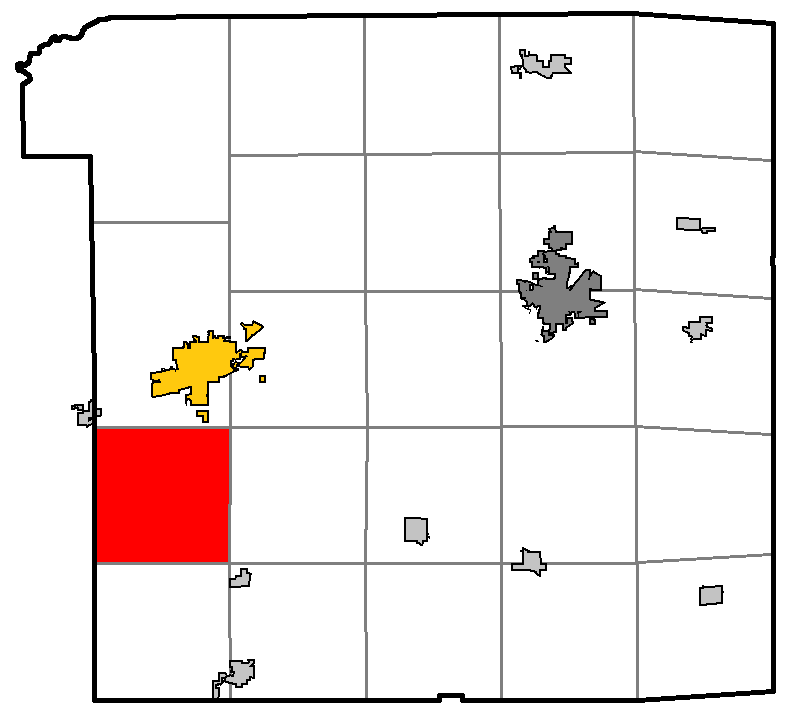
- Location of the Town of Leon, Monroe County

- Coordinates: 43°51′10″N 90°51′6″W
- Country: United States
- State: Wisconsin
- County: Monroe

Area
  - Total: 35.8 sq mi (92.6 km^{2})
  - Land: 35.8 sq mi (92.6 km^{2})
  - Water: 0 sq mi (0.0 km^{2})
- Elevation: 892 ft (272 m)

Population (2020)
  - Total: 1,144
  - Density: 32.0/sq mi (12.4/km^{2})
- Time zone: UTC-6 (Central (CST))
  - Summer (DST): UTC-5 (CDT)
- Area code: 608
- FIPS code: 55-43475
- GNIS feature ID: 1583544
- Website: https://townofleonmocowi.gov/

The Town of Leon is located in Monroe County, Wisconsin, United States. The population was 1,144 at the 2020 census. Leon is said to have been named after León, Guanajuato in Mexico.

== Recreation ==
=== GatorFest ===
Leon's yearly celebration is GatorFest, which began in 2003.

== Geography ==
According to the United States Census Bureau, the town has a total area of 35.8 square miles (92.6 km^{2}), all land.

== Demographics ==
As of the census of 2000, there were 858 people, 301 households, and 247 families residing in the town. The population density was 24.0 people per square mile (9.3/km^{2}). There were 320 housing units at an average density of 8.9 per square mile (3.5/km^{2}). The racial makeup of the town was 98.83% White, 0.35% Native American, 0.23% Asian, and 0.58% from two or more races. Hispanic or Latino of any race were 1.40% of the population.

There were 301 households, out of which 39.9% had children under the age of 18 living with them, 72.4% were married couples living together, 6.0% had a female householder with no husband present, and 17.9% were non-families. 14.6% of all households were made up of individuals, and 5.3% had someone living alone who was 65 years of age or older. The average household size was 2.85 and the average family size was 3.17.

In the town, the population was spread out, with 28.9% under the age of 18, 6.2% from 18 to 24, 30.3% from 25 to 44, 24.9% from 45 to 64, and 9.7% who were 65 years of age or older. The median age was 37 years. For every 100 females, there were 104.8 males. For every 100 females age 18 and over, there were 105.4 males.

The median income for a household in the town was $45,526, and the median income for a family was $48,250. Males had a median income of $29,821 versus $26,875 for females. The per capita income for the town was $17,415. About 3.5% of families and 4.7% of the population were below the poverty line, including 4.3% of those under age 18 and 3.8% of those age 65 or over.

== Notable people ==
- William J. Austin, miller, farmer, and Wisconsin legislator, lived in the town
- Donald "Deke" Slayton, American World War II pilot, aeronautical engineer, astronaut and test pilot

== See also ==
- Wisconsin Highway 27 - runs through town and connects to I-90 just outside of town
