= William J. Austin =

19th century American politician

Member of the Wisconsin State Assembly from the Monroe 1st district
- In office January 3, 1881 – January 2, 1882
- Preceded by: Eli Waste
- Succeeded by: Mason A. Thayer

Personal details
- Born: May 27, 1822 Johnston Township, Trumbull County, Ohio, U.S.
- Died: April 30, 1904 (aged 81) Leon, Monroe County, Wisconsin, U.S.
- Party: Republican

William J. Austin (May 27, 1822 – April 30, 1904) was an American miller, farmer, and politician. He served one term in the Wisconsin State Assembly, representing Monroe County.

== Biography ==
Born in the township of Johnston, Trumbull County, Ohio, Austin moved with his parents to Medina County, Ohio in 1825. Austin went to school in Poland, Ohio and was a farmer and teacher. In 1847, Austin moved to Sheboygan, Wisconsin Territory. He also lived in Rock County, Wisconsin. Then, in 1851, Austin moved to the town of Leon, Monroe County, Wisconsin. Austin owned a mill and merchandise store in Leon, Wisconsin. He was a farmer. He served as Leon Town Treasurer and as superintendent of schools. In 1881, Austin served in the Wisconsin State Assembly and was a Republican. Austin died in Leon, Wisconsin.
