= Ohio State Route 289 =

State highway in Mahoning County, Ohio, US

State Route 289

Route information
- Maintained by ODOT
- Length: 9.93 mi (15.98 km)
- Existed: 1950–present

Major junctions
- West end: US 422 / SR 193 in Youngstown
- US 62 / SR 7 in Youngstown
- East end: Pennsylvania State Line near Lowellville

Location
- Country: United States
- State: Ohio
- Counties: Mahoning

Highway system
- Ohio State Highway System; Interstate; US; State; Scenic
← SR 288	→ I-290

State Route 289 (SR 289) is a 9.93-mile (15.98 km) east–west state highway in the northeastern quadrant of the U.S. state of Ohio. The western terminus of SR 289 is at a diamond interchange with U.S. Route 422 (US 422) and SR 193 in Youngstown. Its eastern terminus is at the Pennsylvania state line just 0.50 miles (0.80 km) east of Lowellville. Continuing east into Pennsylvania after SR 289 ends is locally maintained Graham Road.

== Route description ==
SR 289 runs entirely within the northeastern quadrant of Mahoning County. No portion of this highway is included as a part of the National Highway System (NHS). The NHS is a network of highways identified as being most important for the economy, mobility and defense of the nation.

== History ==
The SR 289 designation was applied in 1950. Originally, the highway was routed from the intersection with Wick Avenue, at the time a part of US 62/SR 7, and running southeasterly along its present alignment to its eastern terminus at the Pennsylvania state line just southeast of Lowellville. Prior to 1950, SR 289 was designated as the easternmost segment of SR 18.

By 1971, when the freeway carrying SR 193 and US 422 between Interstate 680 (I-680) and US 62/SR 7 in Youngstown was opened, the resulting re-routing of US 422 onto the freeway led to the extension of SR 289 along the former path of US 422 along Rayen Avenue and Federal Street to its present western terminus at the interchange with US 422 and SR 193.

== Major intersections ==
The entire route is in Mahoning County.

Location	mi	km	Destinations	Notes
Youngstown	0.00	0.00	US 422 (Martin Luther King Boulevard) / SR 193 (Wirt Avenue) to Madison Avenue / I-680	Interchange
Youngstown	2.05	3.30	US 62 west / SR 7 south to I-680	Interchange; access only to US 62 west/SR 7 south / from US 62 east/SR 7 north
Struthers	5.96	9.59	SR 616 (North Bridge Street) – Hubbard, Poland	
Poland Township	9.93	15.98	Graham Road	Pennsylvania state line
1.000 mi = 1.609 km; 1.000 km = 0.621 mi: Incomplete access
