= Williamsfield Township, Ashtabula County, Ohio =

Township in Ohio, US

- Township
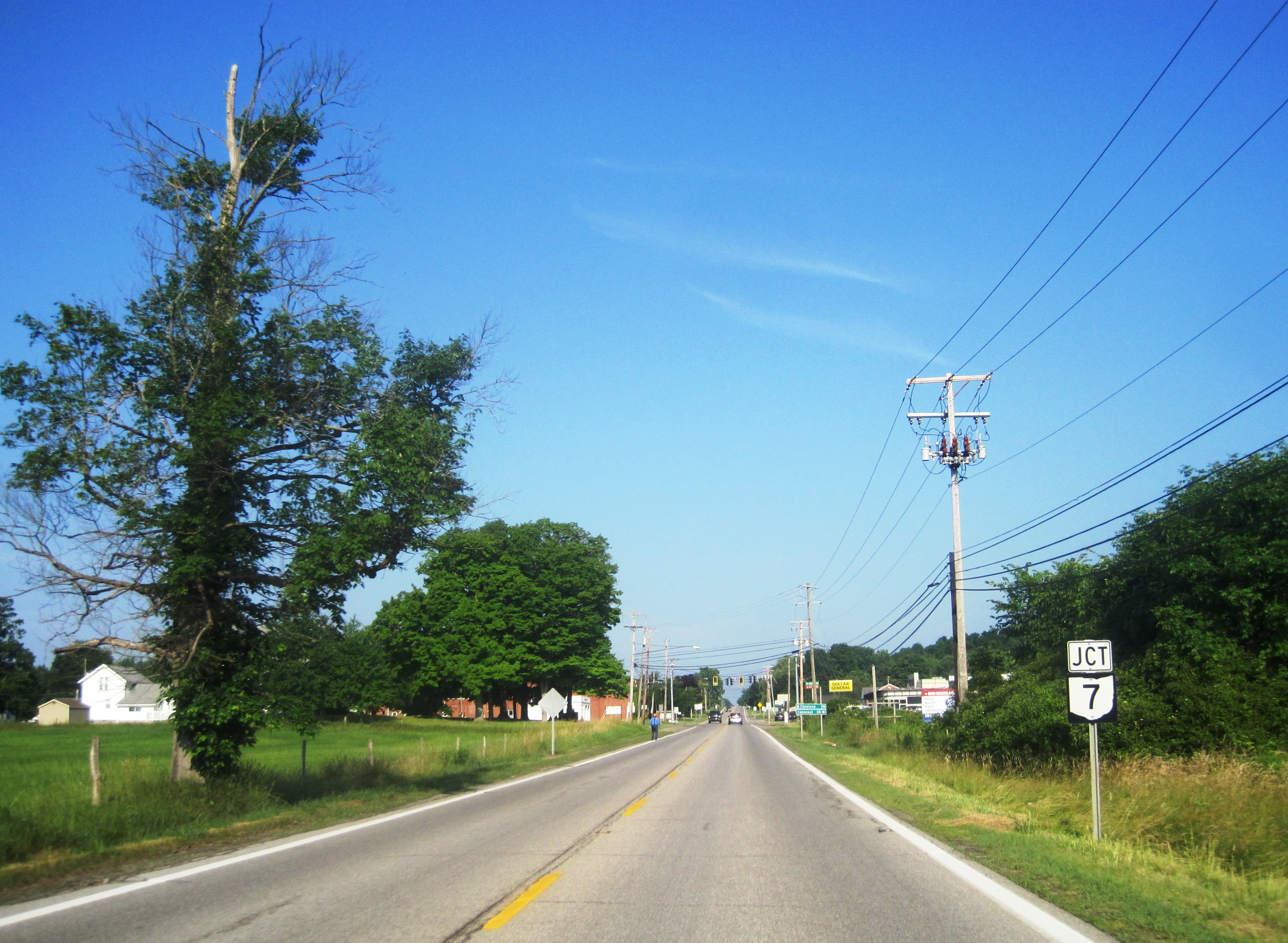
- Westbound US 322 approaching SR 7

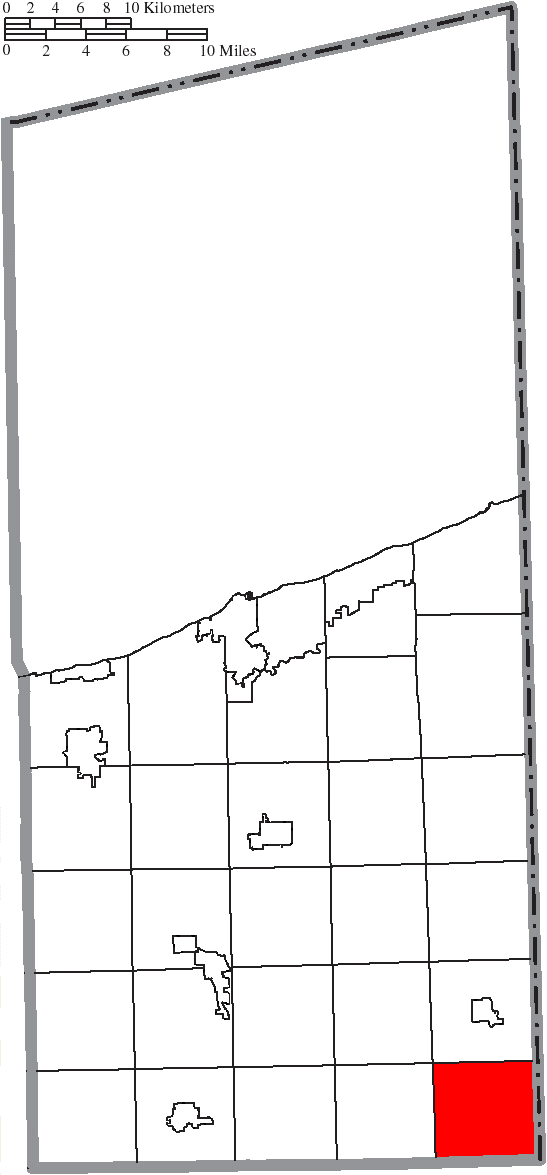
- Location of Williamsfield Township in Ashtabula County
- Coordinates: 41°32′53″N 80°32′21″W
- Country: United States
- State: Ohio
- County: Ashtabula

Area
  - Total: 25.6 sq mi (66.2 km^{2})
  - Land: 24.8 sq mi (64.3 km^{2})
  - Water: 0.73 sq mi (1.9 km^{2})
- Elevation: 1,145 ft (349 m)

Population (2020)
  - Total: 1,419
  - Density: 57.2/sq mi (22.1/km^{2})
- Time zone: UTC-5 (Eastern (EST))
  - Summer (DST): UTC-4 (EDT)
- ZIP code: 44093
- Area code: 440
- FIPS code: 39-85372
- GNIS feature ID: 1085746

Williamsfield Township is one of the twenty-seven townships of Ashtabula County, Ohio, United States. The 2020 census found 1,419 people in the township.

== Geography ==
Located in the southeastern corner of the county, it borders the following townships:

- Andover Township - north
- South Shenango Township, Pennsylvania - northeast
- West Shenango Township, Crawford County, Pennsylvania - southeast
- Kinsman Township, Trumbull County - south
- Gustavus Township, Trumbull County - southwest corner
- Wayne Township - west
- Cherry Valley Township - northwest corner

No municipalities are located in Williamsfield Township, although the unincorporated community of Williamsfield lies in the township's center.

== Name and history ==
Named for an early landowner, it is the only Williamsfield Township statewide.

When whites first arrived in what is now Williamsfield Township, the land was inhabited by a small number of Delaware Indians. The first white man to settle in the township was Charles Case, who came from Connecticut in 1804.

Williamsfield Township was organized in 1826. In 1833, the township contained two stores, three saw mills, and a fulling mill.

== Government ==
The township is governed by a three-member board of trustees, who are elected in November of odd-numbered years to a four-year term beginning on the following January 1. Two are elected in the year after the presidential election and one is elected in the year before it. There is also an elected township fiscal officer, who serves a four-year term beginning on April 1 of the year after the election, which is held in November of the year before the presidential election. Vacancies in the fiscal officership or on the board of trustees are filled by the remaining trustees. The board is currently composed of chairman Thomas Martin and members Gordon Eastlake and Thomas Lahti.
