= Johnston Township, Trumbull County, Ohio =

Township in Ohio, US

- Township
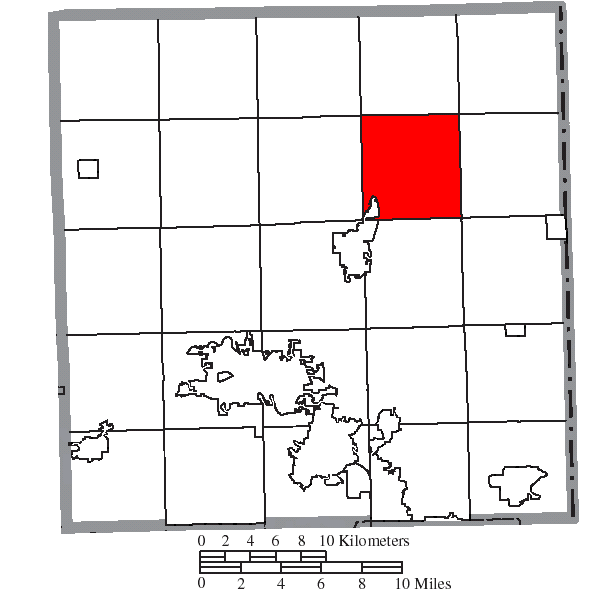
- Location of Johnston Township in Trumbull County
- Coordinates: 41°23′21″N 80°39′51″W
- Country: United States
- State: Ohio
- County: Trumbull

Area
  - Total: 24.7 sq mi (63.9 km^{2})
  - Land: 24.7 sq mi (63.9 km^{2})
  - Water: 0 sq mi (0.0 km^{2})
- Elevation: 1,089 ft (332 m)

Population (2020)
  - Total: 1,739
  - Density: 70/sq mi (26.9/km^{2})
- Time zone: UTC-5 (Eastern (EST))
  - Summer (DST): UTC-4 (EDT)
- FIPS code: 39-39298
- GNIS feature ID: 1087035

Johnston Township is one of the twenty-four townships of Trumbull County, Ohio, United States. The 2020 census found 1,739 people in the township.

== Geography ==
Located in the northeastern part of the county, it borders the following townships:

- Gustavus Township - north
- Kinsman Township - northeast corner
- Vernon Township - east
- Hartford Township - southeast corner
- Fowler Township - south
- Bazetta Township - southwest corner
- Mecca Township - west
- Greene Township - northwest corner

Part of the city of Cortland is located in southwestern Johnston Township.

== Name and history ==
Johnston Township was established in 1816, and named after Captain James Johnston, a Connecticut land agent. It is the only Johnston Township statewide, although there is a Johnson Township in Champaign County.

== Government ==
The township is governed by a three-member board of trustees, who are elected in November of odd-numbered years to a four-year term beginning on the following January 1. Two are elected in the year after the presidential election and one is elected in the year before it. There is also an elected township fiscal officer, who serves a four-year term beginning on April 1 of the year after the election, which is held in November of the year before the presidential election. Vacancies in the fiscal officership or on the board of trustees are filled by the remaining trustees.

=== Board of trustees ===
Davis W Denman - Chairman

Dominic Marchese - Chairman

James N. Carnes - Trustee

John T. Moran - Fiscal Officer

== Notable people ==
- William J. Austin, miller, farmer, and Wisconsin state legislator, was born in the township.
