= Wayne Township, Ashtabula County, Ohio =

Township in Ohio, US

- Township
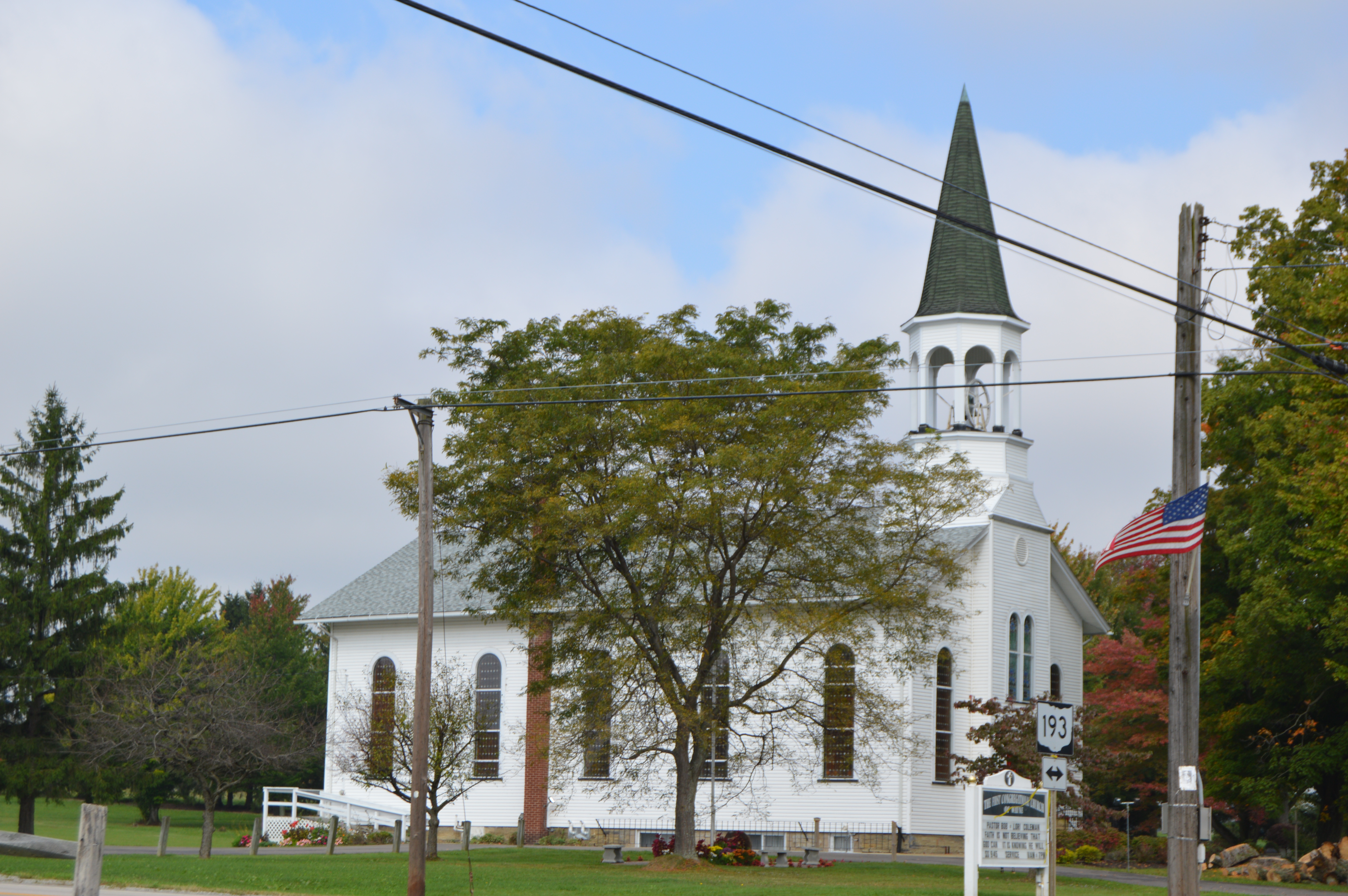
- Congregational church at Wayne Center

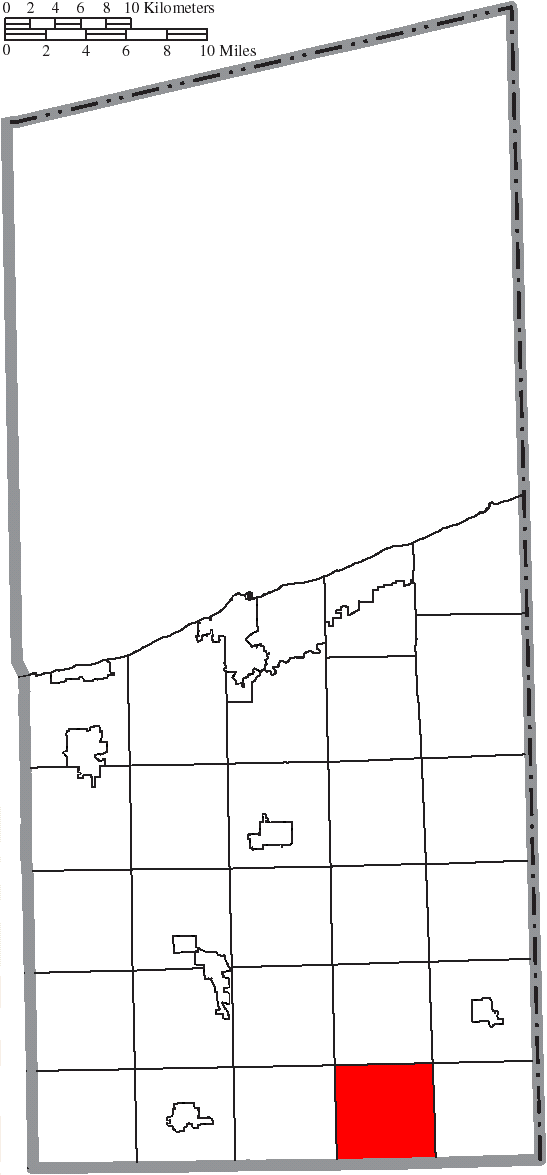
- Location of Wayne Township in Ashtabula County
- Coordinates: 41°31′22″N 80°39′25″W
- Country: United States
- State: Ohio
- County: Ashtabula

Area
  - Total: 24.1 sq mi (62.4 km^{2})
  - Land: 23.9 sq mi (62.0 km^{2})
  - Water: 0.15 sq mi (0.4 km^{2})
- Elevation: 1,109 ft (338 m)

Population (2020)
  - Total: 668
  - Density: 27.9/sq mi (10.8/km^{2})
- Time zone: UTC-5 (Eastern (EST))
  - Summer (DST): UTC-4 (EDT)
- ZIP code: 44093
- Area code: 440
- FIPS code: 39-82040
- GNIS feature ID: 1085745

Historical population
Census	Pop.	Note	%±
1990	610		—
2000	653		7.0%
2010	630		−3.5%
2020	668		6.0%
U.S. Census:

Wayne Township is one of the twenty-seven townships of Ashtabula County, Ohio, United States. The 2020 census found 668 people in the township.

== Geography ==
Located on the southwestern edge of the county, it borders the following townships:

- Cherry Valley Township - north
- Andover Township - northeast corner
- Williamsfield Township - east
- Kinsman Township, Trumbull County - southeast corner
- Gustavus Township, Trumbull County - south
- Greene Township, Trumbull County - southwest corner
- Colebrook Township - west
- New Lyme Township - northwest corner

No municipalities are located in Wayne Township.

== Name and history ==
It is one of twenty Wayne Townships statewide. Wayne Township was named for Anthony Wayne.

The first white settler in Wayne Township was former Connecticut resident Joshua Forbes, who arrived in 1803.

== Government ==
The township is governed by a three-member board of trustees, who are elected in November of odd-numbered years to a four-year term beginning on the following January 1. Two are elected in the year after the presidential election and one is elected in the year before it. There is also an elected township fiscal officer, who serves a four-year term beginning on April 1 of the year after the election, which is held in November of the year before the presidential election. Vacancies in the fiscal officership or on the board of trustees are filled by the remaining trustees. The board is currently composed of chairman Robert Magyar and members John Bilek and Dave Sprague.
