= Cherry Valley Township, Ohio =

Township in Ohio, US

Cherry Valley Township, Ashtabula County, Ohio
- Township
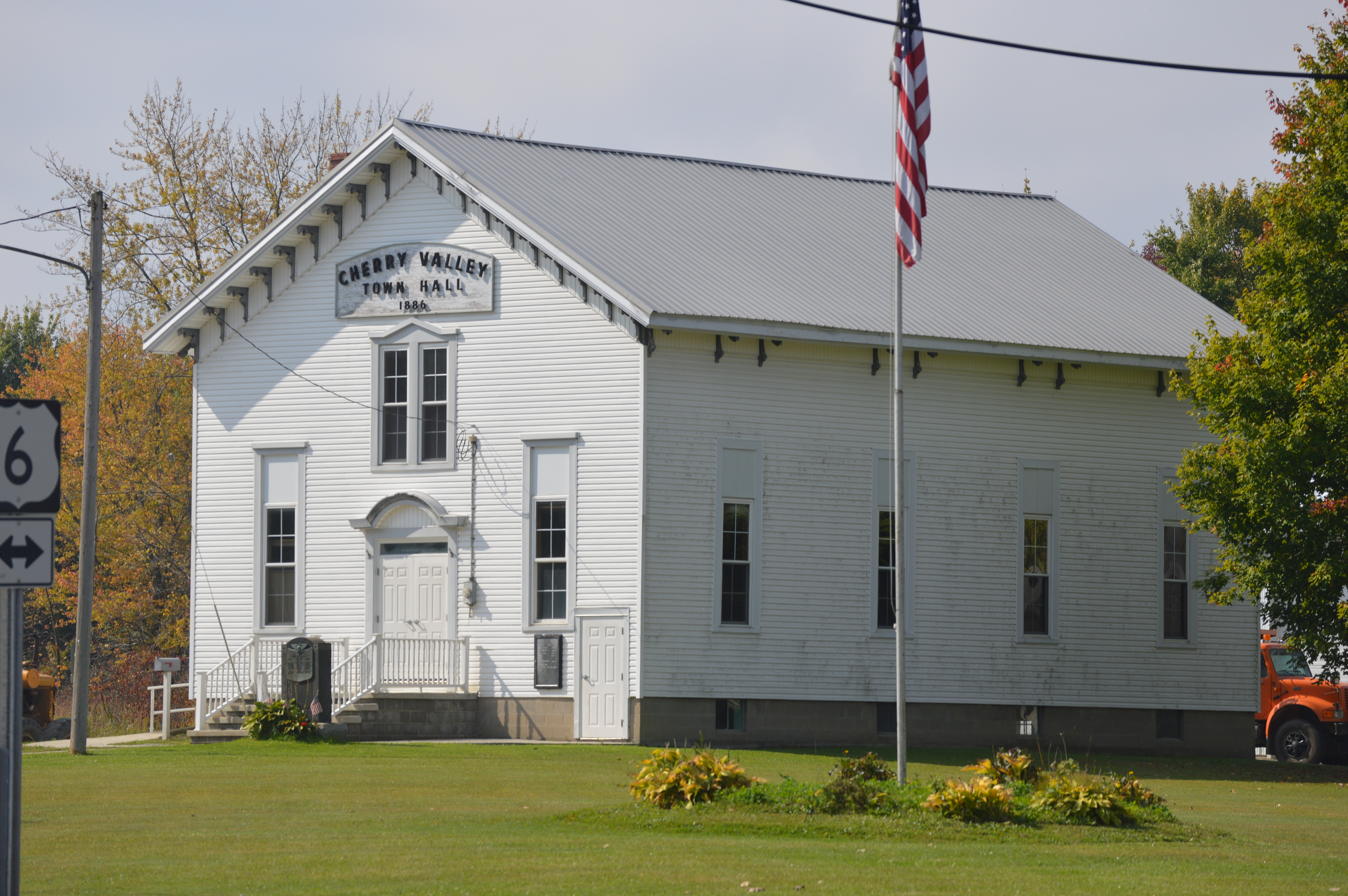
- Cherry Valley's town hall

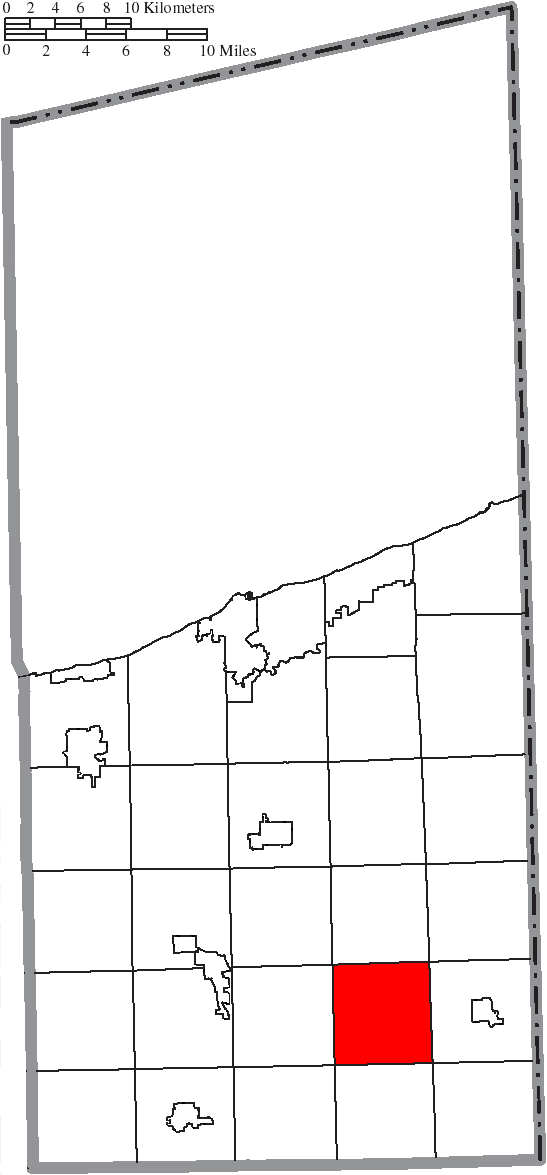
- Location of Cherry Valley Township in Ashtabula County
- Coordinates: 41°36′55″N 80°39′28″W
- Country: United States
- State: Ohio
- County: Ashtabula

Area
  - Total: 24.1 sq mi (62.3 km^{2})
  - Land: 24.0 sq mi (62.1 km^{2})
  - Water: 0.077 sq mi (0.2 km^{2})
- Elevation: 1,040 ft (317 m)

Population (2020)
  - Total: 913
  - Density: 40/sq mi (15.4/km^{2})
- Time zone: UTC-5 (Eastern (EST))
  - Summer (DST): UTC-4 (EDT)
- ZIP code: 44003
- Area code: 440
- FIPS code: 39-13890
- GNIS feature ID: 1085721

Cherry Valley Township is one of the twenty-seven townships of Ashtabula County, Ohio, United States. The 2020 census found 913 people in the township.

== Geography ==
Located in the southeastern part of the county, it borders the following townships:

- Dorset Township - north
- Richmond Township - northeast corner
- Andover Township - east
- Williamsfield Township - southeast corner
- Wayne Township - south
- Colebrook Township - southwest corner
- New Lyme Township - west
- Lenox Township - northwest corner

The unincorporated community of Cherry Valley is located within the center of the township.

=== Major highways ===
- US 6
- SR 193

== Name and history ==
It is the only Cherry Valley Township statewide.

It was first settled in 1818 by former New York resident Nathaniel Hubbard.

Cherry Valley Township was named for the abundant cherry trees growing along a stream.

== Government ==
The township is governed by a three-member board of trustees, who are elected in November of odd-numbered years to a four-year term beginning on the following January 1. Two are elected in the year after the presidential election and one is elected in the year before it. There is also an elected township fiscal officer, who serves a four-year term beginning on April 1 of the year after the election, which is held in November of the year before the presidential election. Vacancies in the fiscal officership or on the board of trustees are filled by the remaining trustees. Currently, the board is composed of chairman Mark Savel and members Robert Gale and Jeff Smith.

== Notable people ==
- General Leonard Wright Colby (1846-1924)
