= Greene Township, Trumbull County, Ohio =

Township in Ohio, US

- Township
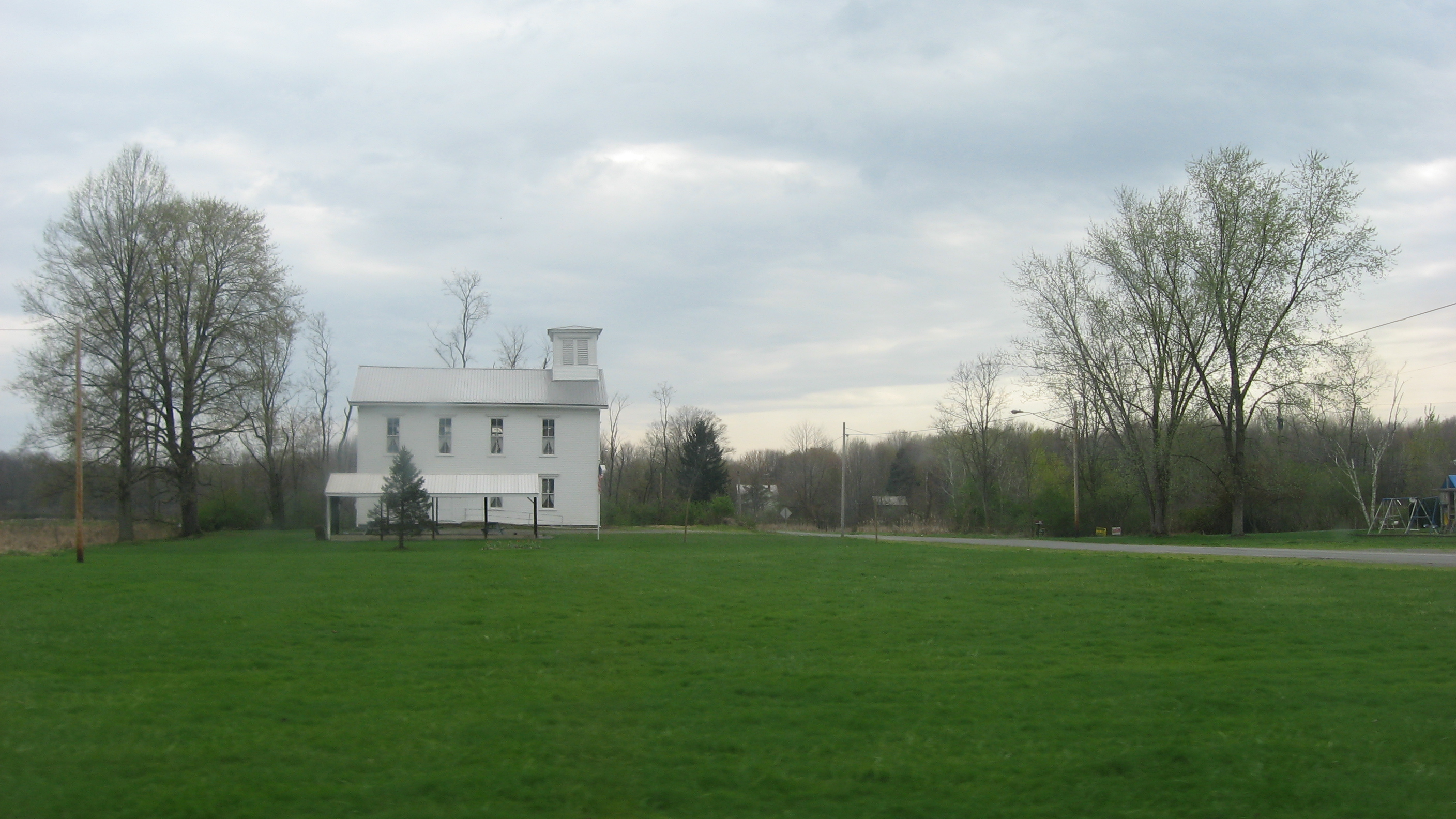
- The village green at Greene Center

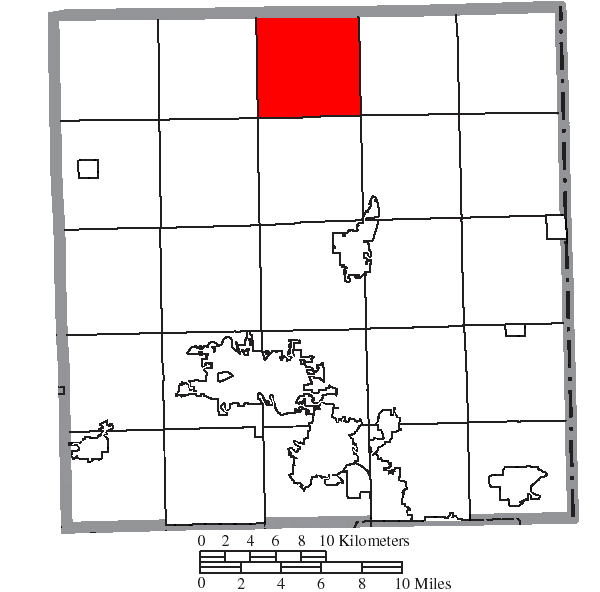
- Location of Greene Township in Trumbull County
- Coordinates: 41°27′30″N 80°45′0″W
- Country: United States
- State: Ohio
- County: Trumbull

Area
  - Total: 26.5 sq mi (68.6 km^{2})
  - Land: 24.1 sq mi (62.4 km^{2})
  - Water: 2.4 sq mi (6.2 km^{2})
- Elevation: 909 ft (277 m)

Population (2020)
  - Total: 950
  - Density: 39/sq mi (15.2/km^{2})
- Time zone: UTC-5 (Eastern (EST))
  - Summer (DST): UTC-4 (EDT)
- ZIP code: 44450
- Area code: 440
- FIPS code: 39-32046
- GNIS feature ID: 1087030

Greene Township is one of the twenty-four townships of Trumbull County, Ohio, United States. The 2020 census found 950 people in the township.

== Geography ==
Located in the northern part of the county, it borders the following townships:

- Colebrook Township, Ashtabula County - north
- Wayne Township, Ashtabula County - northeast corner
- Gustavus Township - east
- Johnston Township - southeast corner
- Mecca Township - south
- Bristol Township - southwest corner
- Bloomfield Township - west
- Orwell Township, Ashtabula County - northwest corner

No municipalities are located in Greene Township. Starting in 1825 a crossroads settlement named "Greensburg" in the central part of the township had a post office; it was discontinued in 1892.

== Name and history ==
Greene Township was established in 1819, and named after one Mr. Greene, a Connecticut Land Company agent. It is the only Greene Township statewide, although there are sixteen Green Townships statewide.

== Government ==
The township is governed by a three-member board of trustees, who are elected in November of odd-numbered years to a four-year term beginning on the following January 1. Two are elected in the year after the presidential election and one is elected in the year before it. There is also an elected township fiscal officer, who serves a four-year term beginning on April 1 of the year after the election, which is held in November of the year before the presidential election. Vacancies in the fiscal officership or on the board of trustees are filled by the remaining trustees.
