= West Salem Township, Pennsylvania =

Township in Pennsylvania, US

Coordinates: 41°25′00″N 80°30′59″W

West Salem Township Mercer County, Pennsylvania
- Township
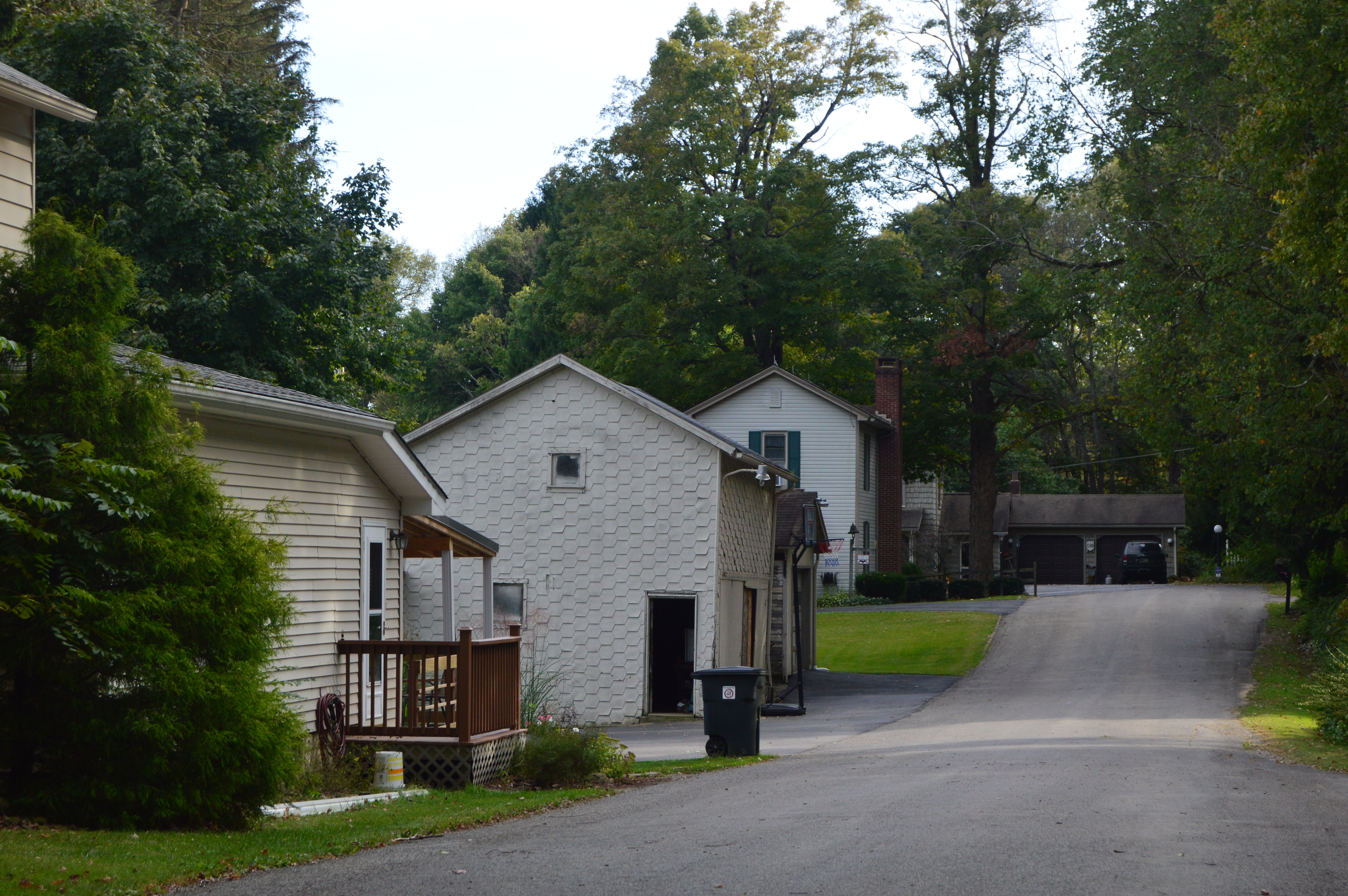
- Street scene in Shenango

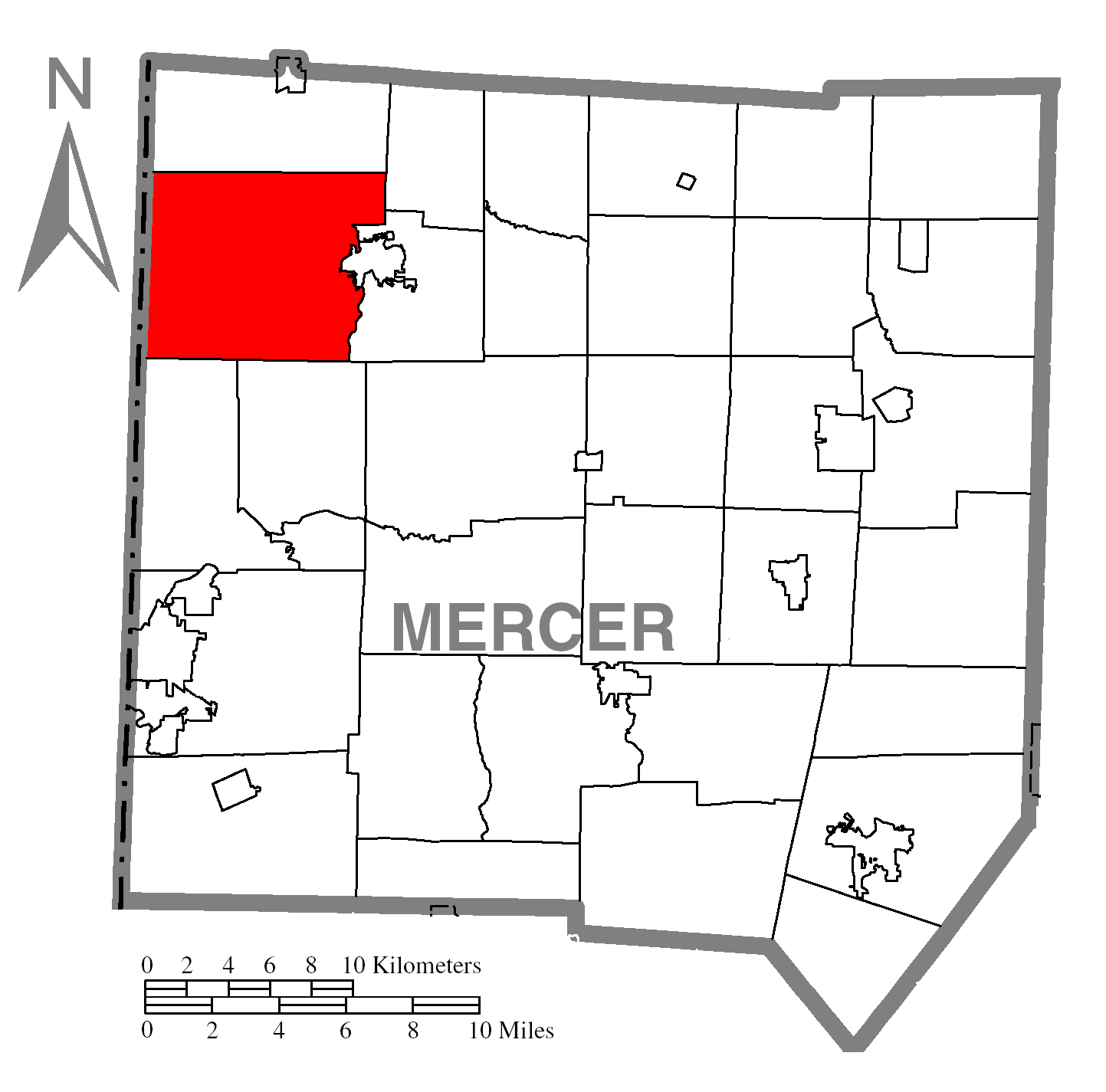
- Location of West Salem Township in Mercer County

- Location of Mercer County in Pennsylvania
- Country: United States
- State: Pennsylvania
- County: Mercer

Area
  - Total: 36.89 sq mi (95.55 km^{2})
  - Land: 36.88 sq mi (95.52 km^{2})
  - Water: 0.0077 sq mi (0.02 km^{2})

Population (2020)
  - Total: 3,216
  - Estimate (2022): 3,213
  - Density: 93.8/sq mi (36.21/km^{2})
- Time zone: UTC-4 (EST)
  - Summer (DST): UTC-5 (EDT)
- Area code: 724
- FIPS code: 42-085-83976
- Website: http://westsalemtwpmc.com/

Historical population
Census	Pop.	Note	%±
2000	3,565		—
2010	3,538		−0.8%
2020	3,220		−9.0%
2022 (est.)	3,213		−0.2%
U.S. Decennial Census

West Salem Township is a township in Mercer County, Pennsylvania, United States. The population was 3,220 at the 2020 census, a decrease from 3,538 in 2010.

== Geography ==
According to the United States Census Bureau, the township has a total area of 37.0 square miles (95.9 km^{2}), of which 37.0 square miles (95.8 km^{2}) is land and 0.03% is water.

== Demographics ==
As of the census of 2000, there were 3,565 people, 1,314 households, and 984 families residing in the township. The population density was 96.3 inhabitants per square mile (37.2/km^{2}). There were 1,441 housing units at an average density of 38.9 per square mile (15.0/km^{2}). The racial makeup of the township was 98.88% White, 0.28% African American, 0.11% Native American, 0.08% Asian, 0.03% from other races, and 0.62% from two or more races. Hispanic or Latino of any race were 0.36% of the population.

There were 1,314 households, out of which 28.6% had children under the age of 18 living with them, 62.8% were married couples living together, 8.3% had a female householder with no husband present, and 25.1% were non-families. 22.1% of all households were made up of individuals, and 12.6% had someone living alone who was 65 years of age or older. The average household size was 2.51 and the average family size was 2.91.

In the township the population was spread out, with 21.3% under the age of 18, 5.9% from 18 to 24, 23.6% from 25 to 44, 25.1% from 45 to 64, and 24.1% who were 65 years of age or older. The median age was 44 years. For every 100 females there were 93.5 males. For every 100 females age 18 and over, there were 88.1 males.

The median income for a household in the township was $38,480, and the median income for a family was $44,706. Males had a median income of $32,281 versus $20,822 for females. The per capita income for the township was $16,834. About 4.1% of families and 6.7% of the population were below the poverty line, including 14.3% of those under age 18 and 1.7% of those age 65 or over.
