= Fowler Township, Trumbull County, Ohio =

Township in Ohio, US

- Township
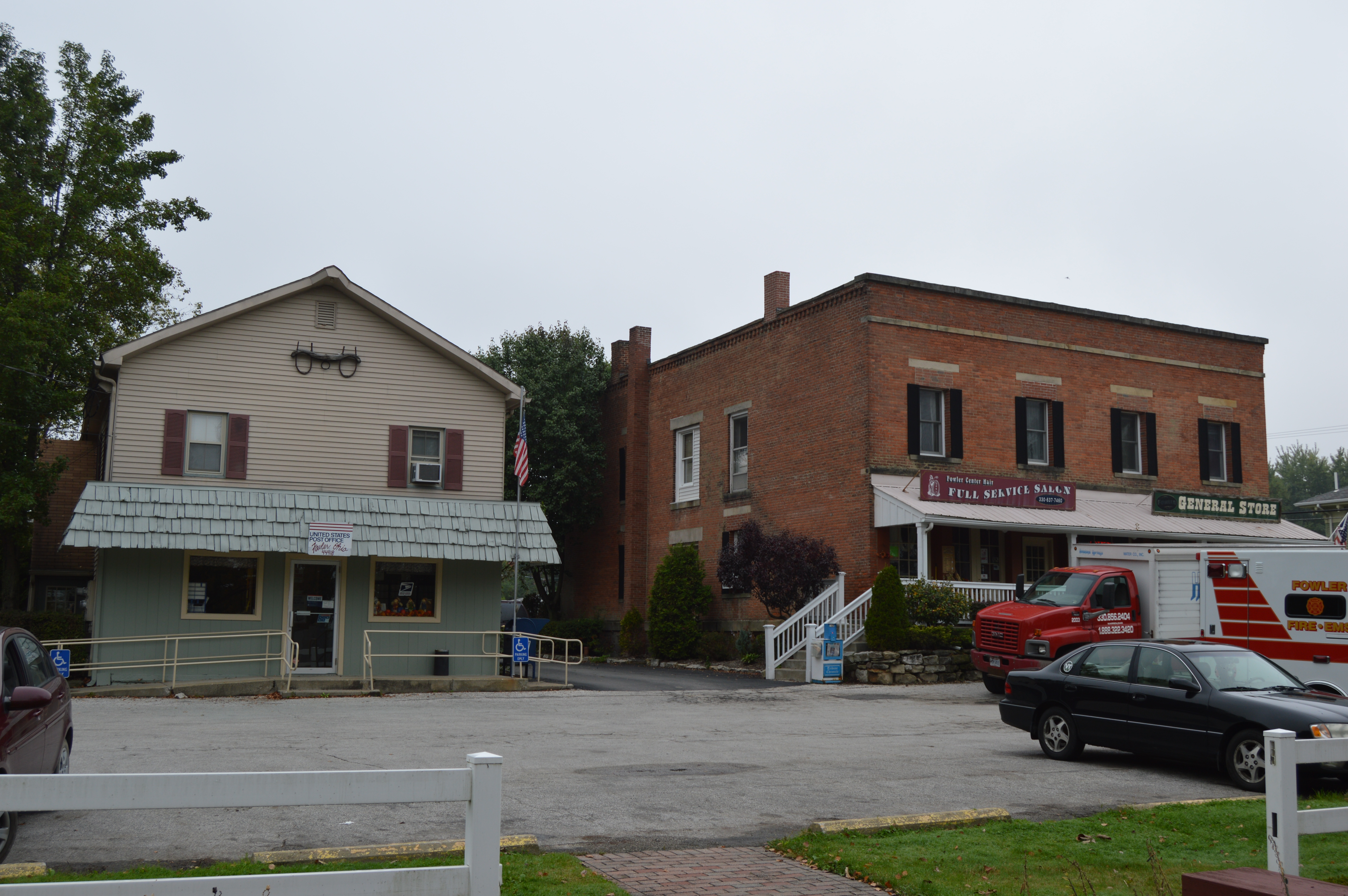
- Commercial buildings at Fowler Center

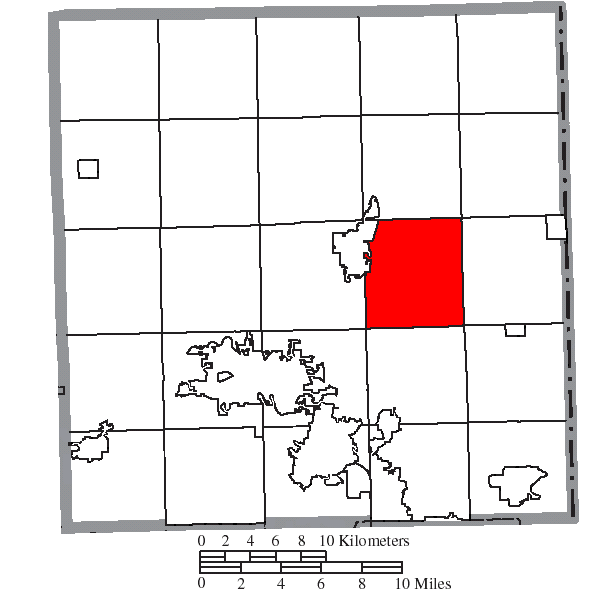
- Location of Fowler Township in Trumbull County
- Coordinates: 41°17′59″N 80°40′25″W
- Country: United States
- State: Ohio
- County: Trumbull

Area
  - Total: 25.1 sq mi (64.9 km^{2})
  - Land: 25.1 sq mi (64.9 km^{2})
  - Water: 0 sq mi (0.0 km^{2})
- Elevation: 1,138 ft (347 m)

Population (2020)
  - Total: 2,360
  - Density: 94.2/sq mi (36.4/km^{2})
- Time zone: UTC-5 (Eastern (EST))
  - Summer (DST): UTC-4 (EDT)
- ZIP code: 44418
- Area codes: 234/330
- FIPS code: 39-28098
- GNIS feature ID: 1087029

Fowler Township is one of the twenty-four townships of Trumbull County, Ohio, United States. The 2020 census found 2,360 people in the township.

== Geography ==
Located in the eastern part of the county, it borders the following townships:

- Johnston Township - north
- Vernon Township - northeast corner
- Hartford Township - east
- Brookfield Township - southeast corner
- Vienna Township - south
- Howland Township - southwest corner
- Bazetta Township - west
- Mecca Township - northwest corner

Part of the city of Cortland is located in northwestern Fowler Township, and the unincorporated community of Fowler lies at the center of the township.

== Name and history ==
Fowler Township is named for Samuel Fowler, an early landowner. It is the only Fowler Township statewide.

== Government ==
The township is governed by a three-member board of trustees, who are elected in November of odd-numbered years to a four-year term beginning on the following January 1. Two are elected in the year after the presidential election and one is elected in the year before it. There is also an elected township fiscal officer, who serves a four-year term beginning on April 1 of the year after the election, which is held in November of the year before the presidential election. Vacancies in the fiscal officership or on the board of trustees are filled by the remaining trustees.

== Education ==
Students within Fowler Township attend Mathews High School and the Mathews Local School District. High school students are permitted to attend Trumbull Career and Technical Center as an alternative to their home school.
