= Kinsman Township, Trumbull County, Ohio =

Township in Ohio, US

- Township
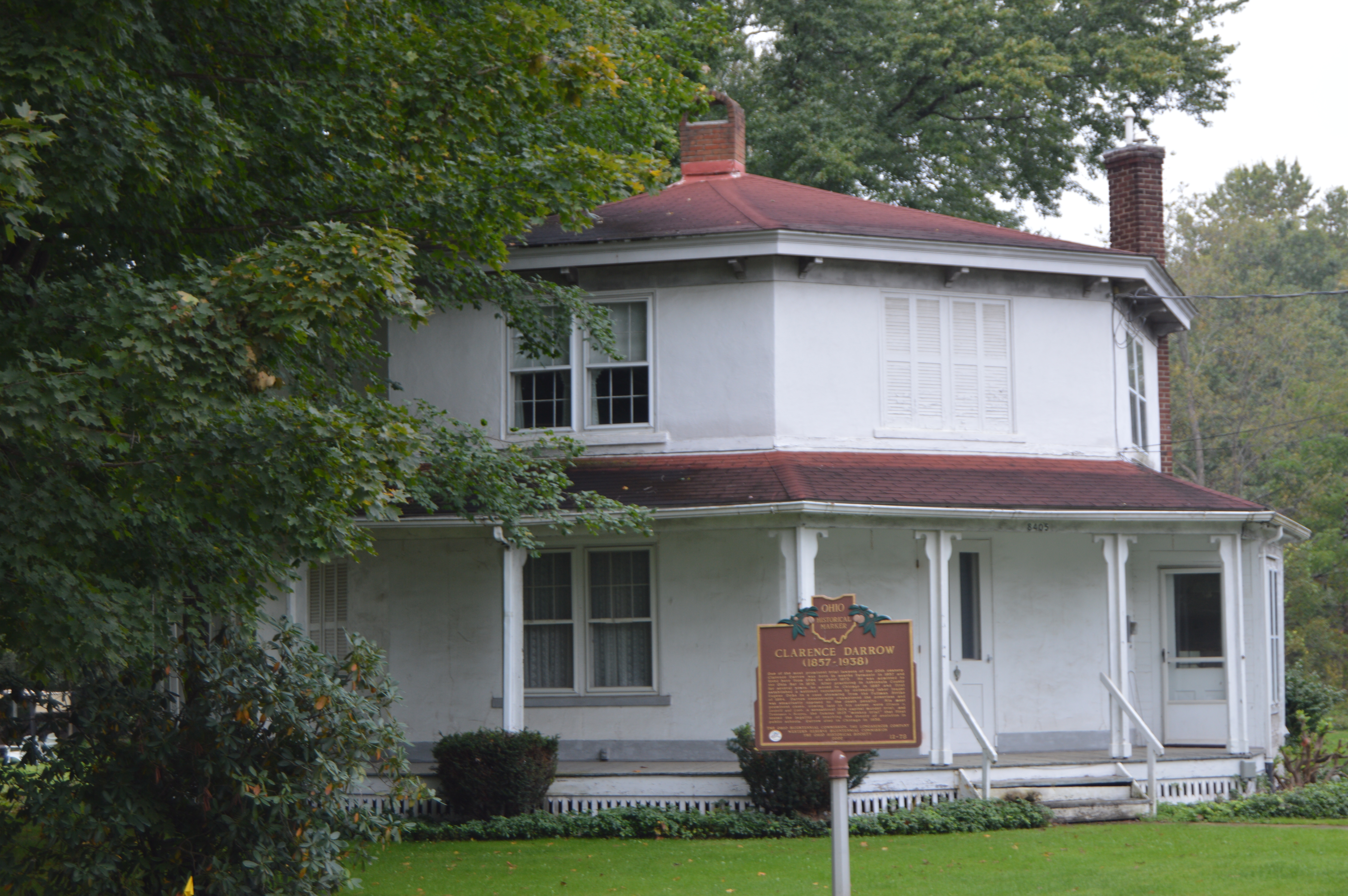
- Clarence Darrow Octagon House in Kinsman

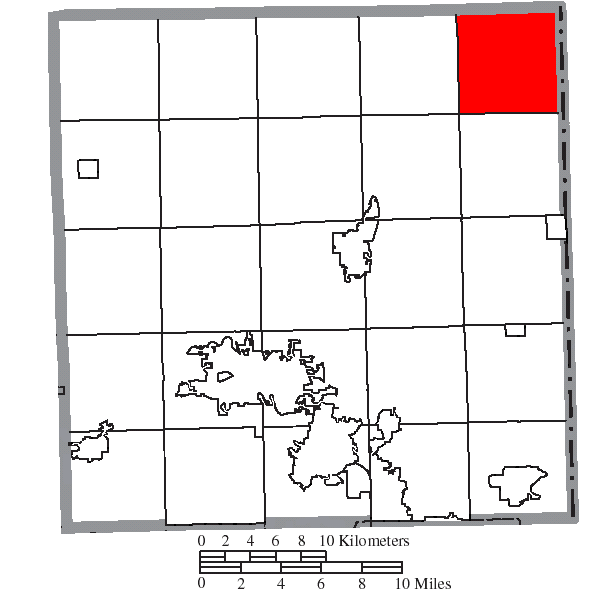
- Location of Kinsman Township in Trumbull County
- Coordinates: 41°27′6″N 80°34′50″W
- Country: United States
- State: Ohio
- County: Trumbull

Area
  - Total: 26.8 sq mi (69.4 km^{2})
  - Land: 26.4 sq mi (68.5 km^{2})
  - Water: 0.35 sq mi (0.9 km^{2})
- Elevation: 1,010 ft (308 m)

Population (2020)
  - Total: 1,751
  - Density: 66/sq mi (25.6/km^{2})
- Time zone: UTC-5 (Eastern (EST))
  - Summer (DST): UTC-4 (EDT)
- ZIP code: 44428
- Area codes: 234/330
- FIPS code: 39-40502
- GNIS feature ID: 1087036
- Website: Township website

Kinsman Township is one of the twenty-four townships of Trumbull County, Ohio, United States. The 2020 census found 1,751 people in the township.

== Geography ==
Located in the northeastern corner of the county, it borders the following townships:

- Williamsfield Township, Ashtabula County - north
- West Shenango Township, Crawford County, Pennsylvania - northeast
- Greene Township, Mercer County, Pennsylvania - east
- West Salem Township, Mercer County, Pennsylvania - southeast
- Vernon Township - south
- Johnston Township - southwest corner
- Gustavus Township - west
- Wayne Township, Ashtabula County - northwest corner

No municipalities are located in Kinsman Township, although two unincorporated communities lie in the township: Farmdale in the southwest, and Kinsman in the south.

== Name and history ==
Kinsman Township was named for a local family of early settlers. It is the only Kinsman Township statewide.

== Government ==
The township is governed by a three-member board of trustees, who are elected in November of odd-numbered years to a four-year term beginning on the following January 1. Two are elected in the year after the presidential election and one is elected in the year before it. There is also an elected township fiscal officer, who serves a four-year term beginning on April 1 of the year after the election, which is held in November of the year before the presidential election. Vacancies in the fiscal officership or on the board of trustees are filled by the remaining trustees.

== Notable residents ==
Clarence Darrow was born in Kinsman Township.
