= Gustavus Township, Trumbull County, Ohio =

Township in Ohio, US

- Township
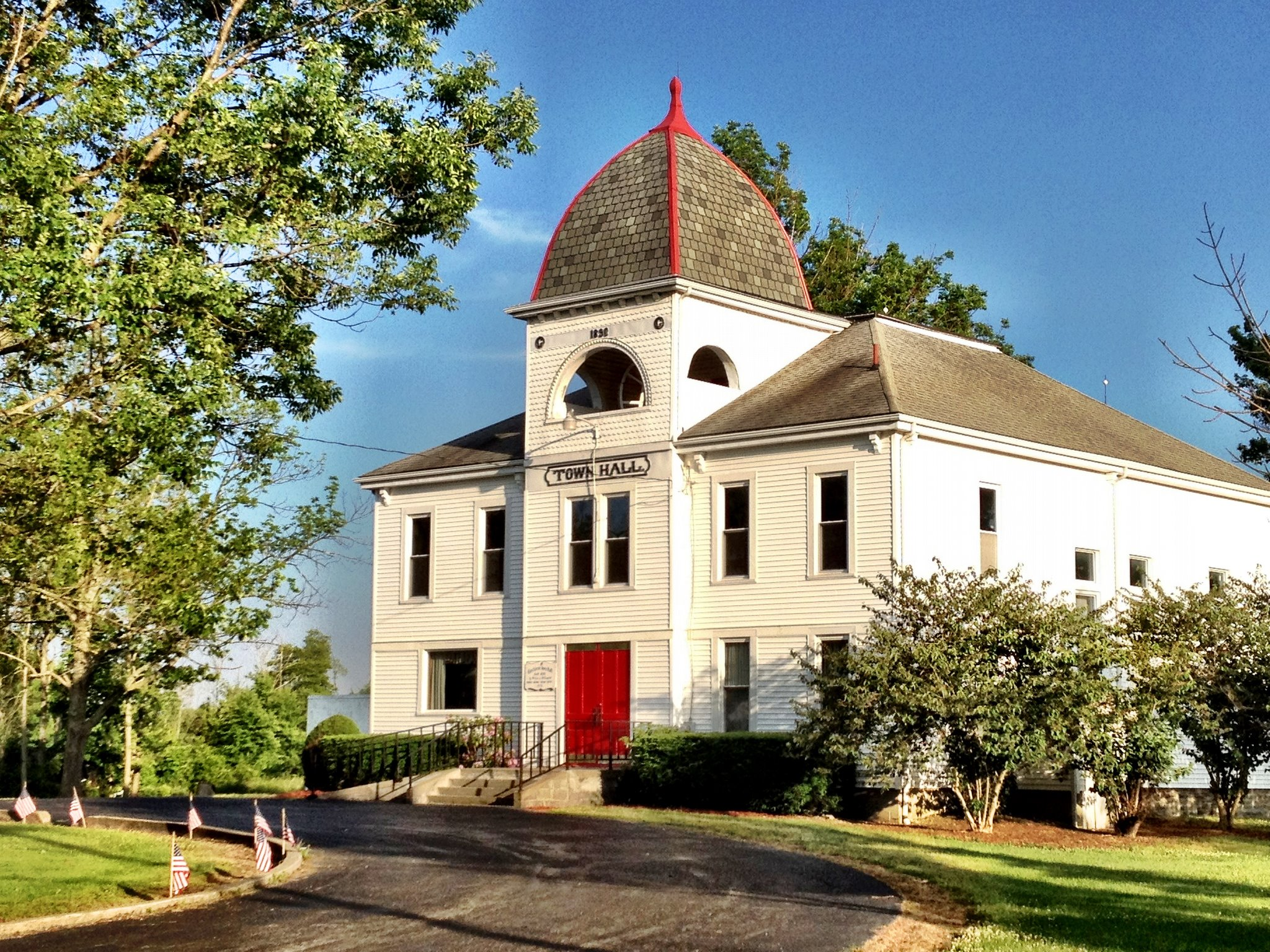
- Township hall at Gustavus Center

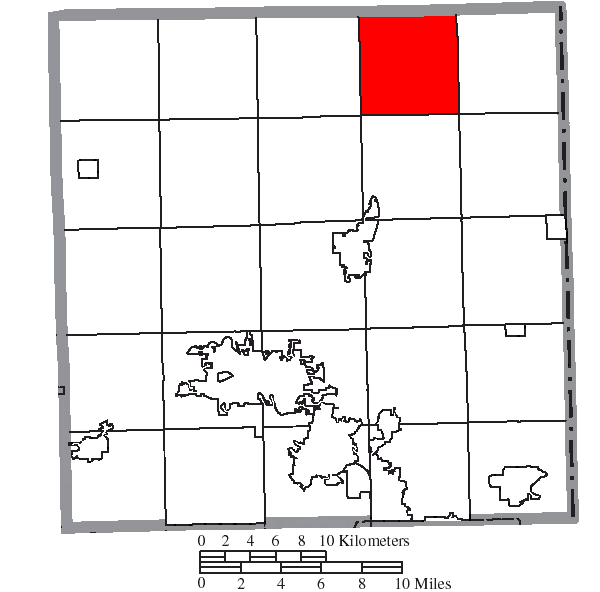
- Location of Gustavus Township in Trumbull County
- Coordinates: 41°27′16″N 80°39′19″W
- Country: United States
- State: Ohio
- County: Trumbull

Area
  - Total: 25.0 sq mi (64.7 km^{2})
  - Land: 25.0 sq mi (64.7 km^{2})
  - Water: 0 sq mi (0.0 km^{2})
- Elevation: 978 ft (298 m)

Population (2020)
  - Total: 834
  - Density: 33.4/sq mi (12.9/km^{2})
- Time zone: UTC-5 (Eastern (EST))
  - Summer (DST): UTC-4 (EDT)
- ZIP code: 44417 The 44417 ZIP code is Farmdale. It is currently located within the Kinsman, Ohio, post office because the Farmdale building was demolished.
- Area codes: 234/330
- FIPS code: 39-32732
- GNIS feature ID: 1087031
- Website: https://gustavustownship.org/

Gustavus Township is one of the twenty-four townships of Trumbull County, Ohio, United States. The 2020 census found 834 people in the township.

== Geography ==
Located in the northeastern part of the county, it borders the following townships:

- Wayne Township, Ashtabula County - north
- Williamsfield Township, Ashtabula County - northeast corner
- Kinsman Township - east
- Vernon Township - southeast corner
- Johnston Township - south
- Mecca Township - southwest corner
- Greene Township - west
- Colebrook Township, Ashtabula County - northwest corner

No municipalities are located in Gustavus Township.

== Name and history ==
Gustavus Township was named after Gustavus Storrs, the son of a land agent. It is the only Gustavus Township statewide.

== Government ==
The township is governed by a three-member board of trustees, who are elected in November of odd-numbered years to a four-year term beginning on the following January 1. Two are elected in the year after the presidential election and one is elected in the year before it. There is also an elected township fiscal officer, who serves a four-year term beginning on April 1 of the year after the election, which is held in November of the year before the presidential election. Vacancies in the fiscal officership or on the board of trustees are filled by the remaining trustees.
