= Northeastern Athletic Conference =

High school athletic conference in Ohio, US

The Northeastern Athletic Conference is an Ohio High School Athletic Association high school athletic conference made up of member schools from Ashtabula, Columbiana, Geauga, Portage and Trumbull county in Ohio. The NAC began conference play in 2002 and was formed by members of the former East Suburban Conference. NAC members played football concurrently with the ESC until the 2008 football season.

== Members ==
School	Nickname	Location	Colors	Year joined	Notes
Stars Division
Cardinal	Huskies	Middlefield	Red, black and white	2025	
Grand Valley	Mustangs	Orwell	Royal blue, navy blue, white and gray	2009; 2024	Left for Chagrin Valley Conference in 2019; rejoined NAC in 2024
Maplewood	Rockets	Mecca	Blue and white	2002	no football
Mathews	Mustangs	Vienna	Red black and white	2003	football joined in 2009
Pymatuning Valley	Lakers	Andover	Maroon and gold	2002	football joined in 2009
St. John	Heralds	Ashtabula	Navy blue and white	2022	
Stripes Division
Badger	Braves	Kinsman	Red and white	2003	no football
Bristol	Panthers	Bristolville	Black and gold	2002	no football
Bloomfield	Cardinals	Bloomfield	Red and black	2002	no football
Chalker	Wildcats	Southington	Orange and black	2002	Chalker in Northern 8 Football Conference for football; football in conference from 2009 to 2020
Leetonia	Bears	Leetonia	Navy blue and white	2026	
Lordstown	Red Devils	Lordstown	Red and blue	2002	no football
Windham	Bombers	Windham	Black and gold	2013	Windham in Northern 8 Football Conference for Football; football in conference from 2013 to 2025

=== Future members ===
School	Nickname	Location	Colors	Year joining	Notes
Brookfield	Warriors	Brookfield	Blue and gold	2027	Joining in 2027 from Mahoning Valley Athletic Conference
Champion	Flashes	Champion Township	Purple and gold	2027	Joining in 2027 from Mahoning Valley Athletic Conference
LaBrae	Vikings	Leavittsburg	Red and gray	2027	Joining in 2027 from Mahoning Valley Athletic Conference
Liberty	Leopards	Liberty Township	Maroon and gold	2027	Joining in 2027 from Mahoning Valley Athletic Conference for all sports except football

== Former members ==
School	Nickname	Location	Colors	Tenure	Notes
Fairport Harding	Skippers	Fairport Harbor	Maroon and white	2020–2026	left for Chagrin Valley Conference
Ledgemont	Redskins	Thompson	Red and white	2008–2014	School closed in 2014. merged with Berkshire High School.
Lutheran East	Falcons	Cleveland Heights	Blue and white	2009–2012	football only joined in 2009. left conference in 2012 to become independent.
Newbury	Black Knights	Newbury	Orange and black	2014–2020	School closed in 2020. merged with West Geauga High School.

== NAC hstory ==
By the early 2000s, majority of the ESC, transitioned out of the conference, in favor of joining the newly formed Northeastern Athletic Conference in 2002, with founding members Bristol, Bloomfield, Chalker, Lordstown, Maplewood and Pymatuning Valley. Two additional nearby schools, Badger and Mathews, joined the NAC in the 2003–04 school year, while Mathews joined the ESC for football only. Grand Valley later joined the NAC from the Chagrin Valley Conference in 2009.

Windham was accepted into the NAC in 2013, leaving the Portage Trail Conference. Ledgemont closed after the 2013–2014 school year after a territory transfer with Berkshire High School. Newbury, who was an original ESC member, replaced their spot NAC in 2014 after leaving the Chagrin Valley Conference.

After 10 years of being in the conference, Grand Valley left the NAC in 2019, in favor of rejoining the Chagrin Valley Conference. Fairport Harding, joined the league after their 15-year long tenure in the Chagrin Valley Conference in 2020. Newbury closed following the 2019–20 school year, after a territory transfer with West Geauga High School.

After not being able to field a team due to low roster numbers in 2021, Chalker forfeited their membership as a football member of the conference. Chalker spent the next couple seasons playing as a club team, before joining the Northern 8 Football Conference, an 8-man football conference in 2024.

Despite playing a conference schedule in all sports with the league for years, Ashtabula St. John High School officially became a member of the NAC in 2022.

Grand Valley rejoined the NAC after a 5-year tenure with the Chagrin Valley Conference in 2024,their former CVC peer, Middlefield Cardinal joined the following year.

Fairport Harding announced their intention to rejoin their former Chagrin Valley Conference starting the 2026–27 school year, ending their tenure with the NAC after 6 years. On September 24, 2025, Leetonia High School announced that they have accepted their invitation to join the NAC, leaving the Eastern Ohio Athletic Conference, and will begin conference play in the 2026–27 school year.

On November 26, 2025, Windham announced they were accepted into the Northern 8 Football Conference beginning the 2026–27 school year, with roster numbers decreasing in recent years. Brookfield, Champion, LaBrae and Liberty announced on March 17, 2026, that they intend to leave the Mahoning Valley Athletic Conference to join the Northeastern Athletic Conference beginning the 2027–28 school year.

== East Suburban Conference ==
The East Suburban Conference was a former Ohio High School Athletic Association (OHSAA) athletic conference that operated from 1968 to 2008. Following the 2000–01 school year, most member schools departed to form the Northeastern Athletic Conference (NAC), leading to the dissolution of the league as an all-sports conference. Beginning in 2002, the East Suburban Conference continued as a football-only league. It remained in operation until 2008, when the departures of Lutheran East, Valley Christian (then known as Youngstown Christian), and Ashtabula St. John prompted the remaining members, already competing in the NAC in other sports, to transition to full-time football membership in the Northeastern Athletic Conference.

=== All-time East Suburban Conference members ===
School	Nickname	Location	Colors	Tenure	Notes
Aurora	Greenmen	Aurora	Dark green, white	1983–1988	to Metro Athletic Conference
Beachwood	Bison	Beachwood	White and gold	1968–1988	to Metro Athletic Conference
Berkshire	Badgers	Burton	Purple and gold	1968–1995	to Chagrin Valley Conference
Bristol	Panthers	Bristolville	Black and gold	1992–2002	no football; to Northeastern Athletic Conference
Bloomfield	Cardinals	Bloomfield	Red and black	1996–2002	no football; to Northeastern Athletic Conference
Cardinal	Huskies	Middlefield	Red, black and white	1968–1995	to Chagrin Valley Conference
Chalker	Wildcats	Southington	Orange and black	1996–2002	football 1996–2008; to Northeastern Athletic Conference
Chardon	Hilltoppers	Chardon	Red and black	1980–1983	to Chagrin Valley Conference
Cleveland Central Catholic	Ironmen	Cleveland	Red, white and blue	2004–2006	football only member; to North Coast
Cuyahoga Valley Christian Academy	Royals	Cuyahoga Falls	Royal blue, white and black	1998–2001	to Principals Athletic Conference
Fairport Harding	Skippers	Fairport Harbor	Maroon and white	1970–1976; 1989–2005	to Grand River in 1976, to Chagrin Valley Conference in 2005
Grand Valley	Mustangs	Orwell	Royal blue, navy blue, white and gray	1989–1997	to Chagrin Valley Conference
Kirtland	Hornets	Kirtland	Navy blue and gold	1968–1995	to Chagrin Valley Conference
Lordstown	Red Devils	Lordstown	Red and blue	1996–2002	no football; to Northeastern Athletic Conference
Ledgemont	Redskins	Thompson	Red and white	1989–2002	football 1989–2008; to Northeastern Athletic Conference
Lutheran East	Falcons	Cleveland Heights	Blue and white	1998–2008	football only member; to Northeastern Athletic Conference
Maplewood	Rockets	Mecca	Blue and white	1996–2002	no football; to Northeastern Athletic Conference
Mathews	Mustangs	Vienna	Red black and white	1989–1991	football 2004–2008; to Northeastern Athletic Conference for football in 2008, left for Inter-County in 1991
Newbury	Black Knights	Newbury	Orange and black	1968–1997	to Chagrin Valley Conference
Perry	Pirates	Perry	Scarlet and white	1984–1995	to Chagrin Valley Conference
Pymatuning Valley	Lakers	Andover	Maroon and gold	1989–1998	football 2004–2008; to Northeastern Athletic Conference in 2008 for football, left for Northeastern in 1998
Richmond Heights	Spartans	Richmond Heights	Blue and white	1968–1989	to Metro Athletic Conference
St. John and Paul	Heralds	Ashtabula	Navy blue and white	1996–2008	football only 2002–2008; became independent
Youngstown Christian	Eagles	Youngstown	Blue and gold	2005–2008	football only member; became independent

== ESC hstory ==
The East Suburban Conference, formed in 1968. Founding members included schools such as Beachwood, Berkshire, Cardinal, Kirtland, Newbury, and Richmond Heights.

Throughout the 1970s and 1980s, the ESC experienced periodic expansion and contraction as schools adjusted conference affiliations based on enrollment and competitive balance. Additions such as Fairport Harding, Chardon, Aurora, and Perry reflected the league's growth, while departures to conferences like the Chagrin Valley Conference and the Metropolitan Area Conference highlighted shifting alignments. Fairport left the conference in 1976 to join the Grand River Conference.

In 1989, the conference found replacements for those who left the year prior, with new members such as Ledgemont, Grand Valley, and Pymatuning Valley shifted the ESC toward a more rural, multi-county alignment extending into Ashtabula County. Fairport rejoined the ESC the same year.

The 1990s brought another wave of expansion, particularly in Trumbull County, with the additions of Bristol, Bloomfield, Chalker, Lordstown, and Maplewood between 1992 and 1995. Several of these schools did not field football programs.

Additional members joined in the late 1990s and 2000s, including St. John and Paul (now known as Saint John School), Cuyahoga Valley Christian Academy, Lutheran East, Cleveland Central Catholic (for football only), and Youngstown Christian (now known as Valley Christian).

Fairport, left for the CVC in 2005 followed by Cleveland Central Catholic in 2006, who joined the North Coast Conference.

The East Suburban Conference folded in 2008, and fully transitioned into the NAC, with Ledgemont, Chalker, Pymatuning Valley, Mathews and Lutheran East all becoming full-time members.

== State championships ==
=== State championships won by each school while as a member of the ESC or NAC ===
School	Sport	Years won
Cardinal	Boys wrestling	1978
Chalker	Softball	1998
Ledgemont	Boys wrestling	1992
Maplewood	Boys cross country Boys track and field	1997, 2002, 2003, 2005, 2014, 2015 2000
Newbury	Boys wrestling	1986
Richmond Heights	Boys wrestling	1979, 1980, 1983, 1984
