= West Geauga Local School District =

School district in Ohio, United States

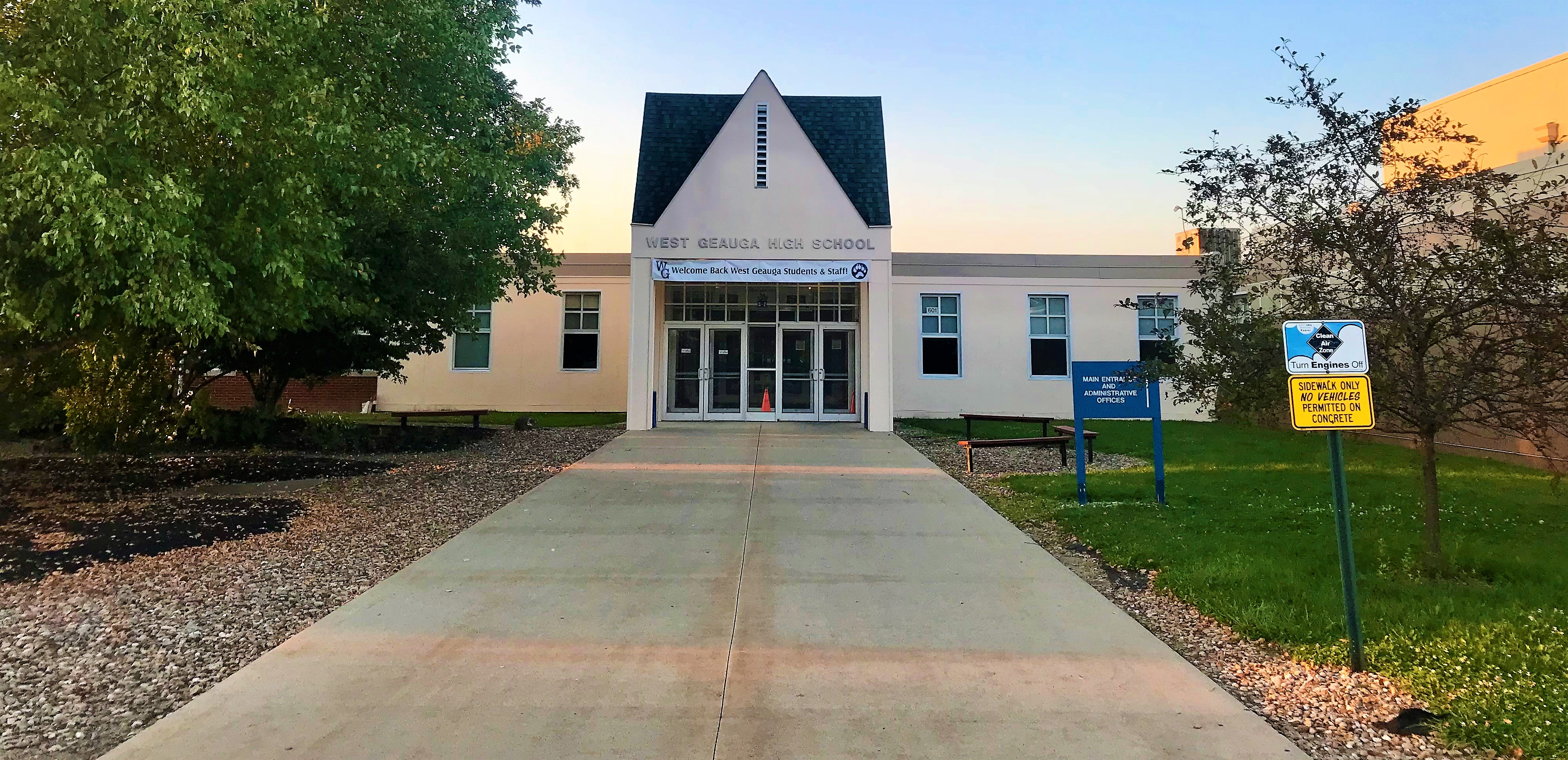
- West Geauga High School

Address
- 86165 Cedar Rd Chesterland, Ohio, 44026; United States

District information
- Type: Public
- Grades: PK–12
- NCES District ID: 3904722

Students and staff
- Enrollment: 1,969 (2024–25)
- Faculty: 106.90 (on an FTE basis)
- Student–teacher ratio: 18.42

Other information
- Website: www.westg.org

The West Geauga Local School District is a school district located in northwestern Geauga County, Ohio. The school district serves students in grades K-12 living in Chesterland, Russell, Newbury and parts of Chargin, Munson and Hunting Valley townships. The district consists of one high school, one middle school and two elementary schools. All buildings and offices are located in Chesterland aside from Westwood Elementary, which is located in Novelty, Ohio.

== History ==
The West Geauga Local School District was formed in 1950, with the consolidation of Chesterland and Russell township schools

West Geauga High School was built following the merger, Westwood Elementary was built in 1959, West Geauga Middle School was built in 1962, and Robert C. Lindsey Elementary was built in 1965.

In 2020, Newbury High School merged into WGHS as part of the merger between the Newbury Local School District and West Geauga Local School District. The merger had been approved in 2019 with a 3–2 vote.

== Schools ==
=== High school ===
- West Geauga High School

=== Middle school ===
- West Geauga Middle School

=== Elementary schools ===
- Robert C Lindsey Elementary School
- Westwood Elementary School
