= Lyle Williams =

American politician

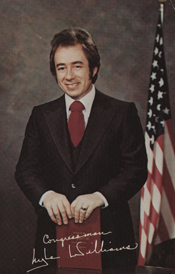

Member of the U.S. House of Representatives from Ohio
- In office January 3, 1979 – January 3, 1985
- Preceded by: Charles J. Carney
- Succeeded by: James Traficant
- Constituency: 19th district (1979–1983); 17th district (1983–1985)

Personal details
- Born: August 23, 1942 Philippi, West Virginia, U.S.
- Died: November 7, 2008 (aged 66) Lordstown, Ohio, U.S.
- Party: Republican
- Spouse: Nancie Peterson
- Children: 4

Lyle Williams (August 23, 1942 – November 7, 2008) was an American politician who served three terms as a U.S. representative from Ohio from 1979 to 1985.

== Biography ==
Williams was born in Philippi, West Virginia to Dale and Frankie (Ice) Williams. He attended the public schools of North Bloomfield, Ohio, graduating from Bloomfield High School in 1960. He served in the United States Army Reserve from 1960 to 1968, and worked as a barber. He married Nancie Peterson in 1964 and had four children.

=== Political career ===
Williams began his political career as a member of the Bloomfield school board from 1970 to 1972, before he was elected a Trumbull County Commissioner, serving from 1972 to 1976. He was elected a Republican to the Ninety-sixth Congress in 1978, narrowly defeating incumbent Democrat Charles J. Carney in a heavily Democratic working class district that included the industrial cities of Youngstown and Warren. He was reelected in 1980, defeating state Senator Harry Meshel, and in 1982 over George D. Tablack. He was defeated for reelection in 1984 by Mahoning County Sheriff James Traficant.

=== After Congress ===
After leaving Congress, Williams worked on the external affairs staff of the Office of Surface Mining in the U.S. Department of the Interior, beginning in 1987. In 1992, he ran for Ohio's 19th congressional district despite living outside its boundaries, but lost the Republican primary to Lake County Commissioner Robert Gardner. In 2000, Williams attempted a rematch against Traficant in the 17th District, but narrowly lost the Republican primary to Paul Alberty, Traficant's 1998 opponent. In Williams's final run for office, he ran for Ohio's 6th congressional district in 2002, intending to challenge Democratic Congressman Ted Strickland. However, he lost to Columbiana County Commissioner Mike Halleck in the Republican primary by a wide margin.

=== Death ===
Williams died of a heart attack in Lordstown, Ohio, on November 7, 2008.

U.S. House of Representatives
Preceded by Charles J. Carney	Member of the U.S. House of Representatives from Ohio's 19th congressional district 1979–1983	Succeeded by Ed Feighan
Preceded by Jean Spencer Ashbrook	Member of the U.S. House of Representatives from Ohio's 17th congressional district 1983–1985	Succeeded by James Traficant
