= North Bloomfield =

North Bloomfield can refer to:

== Places ==
United States

- North Bloomfield, California
- North Bloomfield, Ohio
- North Bloomfield, Wisconsin
- North Bloomfield Township, Morrow County, Ohio

== Other uses ==
- Bloomfield High School (North Bloomfield, Ohio)
- North Bloomfield Mining and Gravel Company
