= Bloomfield Township, Trumbull County, Ohio =

Township in Ohio, US

- Township
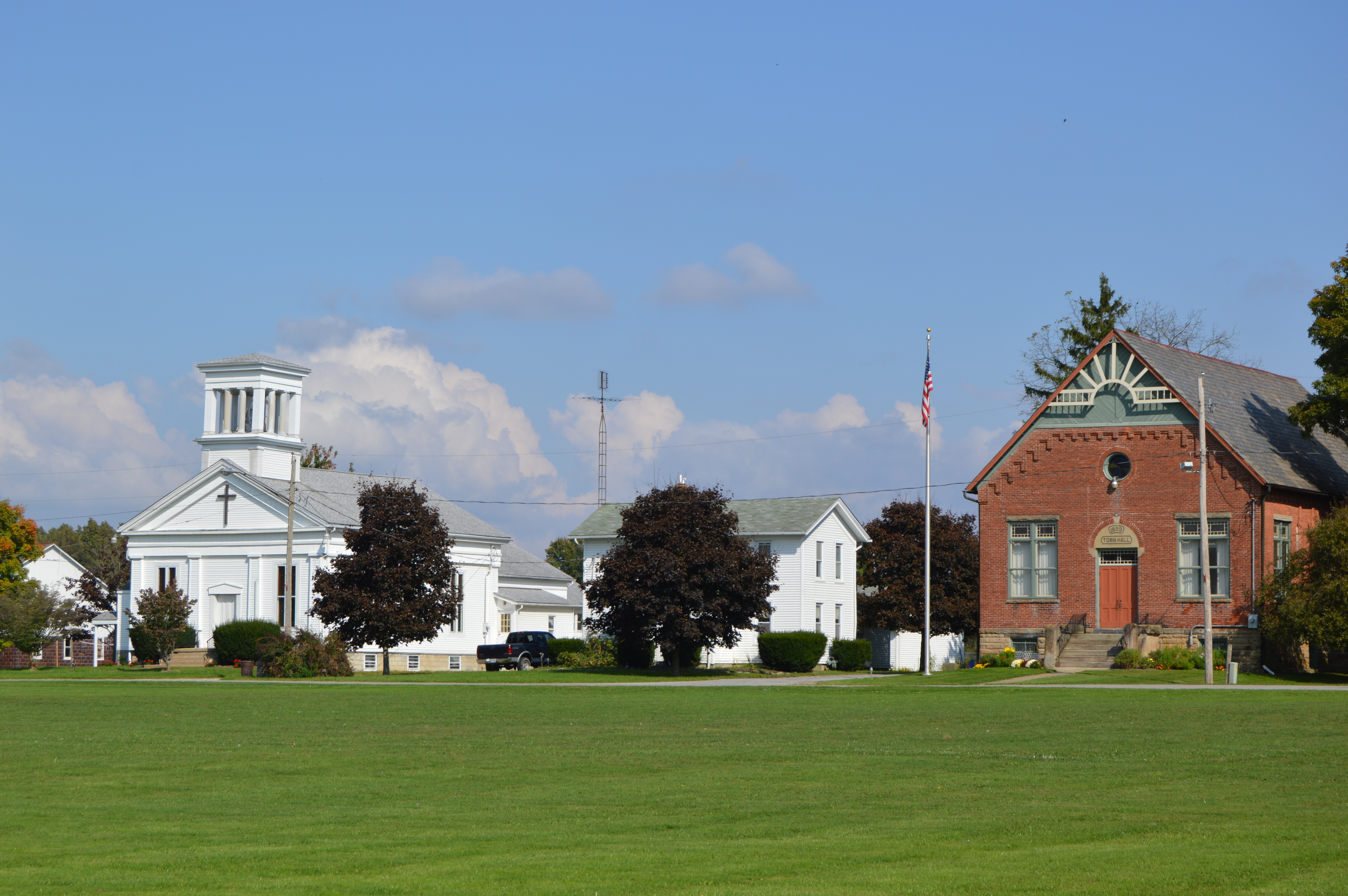
- Bloomfield town green at North Bloomfield

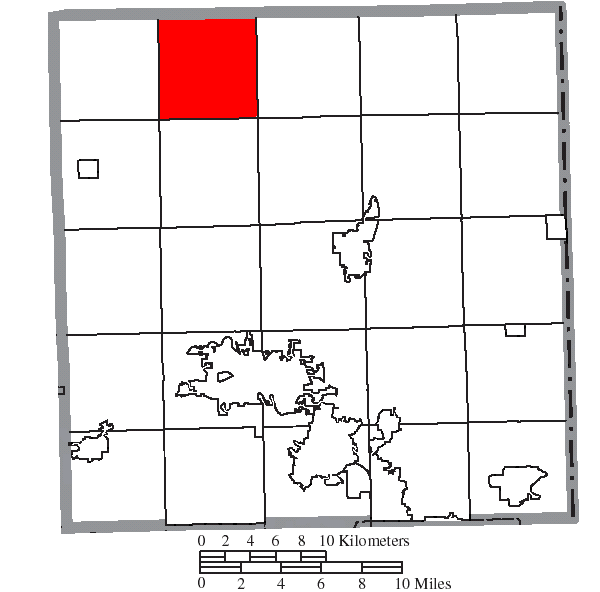
- Location of Bloomfield Township in Trumbull County
- Coordinates: 41°28′14″N 80°51′28″W
- Country: United States
- State: Ohio
- County: Trumbull

Area
  - Total: 25.4 sq mi (65.8 km^{2})
  - Land: 25.4 sq mi (65.8 km^{2})
  - Water: 0 sq mi (0.0 km^{2})
- Elevation: 906 ft (276 m)

Population (2020)
  - Total: 1,249
  - Density: 49.2/sq mi (19.0/km^{2})
- Time zone: UTC-5 (Eastern (EST))
  - Summer (DST): UTC-4 (EDT)
- FIPS code: 39-07160
- GNIS feature ID: 1087023

Bloomfield Township is one of the twenty-four townships of Trumbull County, Ohio, United States. The 2020 census found 1,249 people in the township.

== Geography ==
Located in the northwestern part of the county, it borders the following townships:

- Orwell Township, Ashtabula County – north
- Colebrook Township, Ashtabula County – northeast corner
- Greene Township – east
- Mecca Township – southeast corner
- Bristol Township – south
- Farmington Township – southwest corner
- Mesopotamia Township – west
- Windsor Township, Ashtabula County – northwest corner

No municipalities are located in Bloomfield Township, although the unincorporated community of North Bloomfield lies at the center of the township.

== Name and history ==
Statewide, other Bloomfield Townships are located in Jackson and Logan counties.

== Government ==
The township is governed by a three-member board of trustees, who are elected in November of odd-numbered years to a four-year term beginning on the following January 1. Two are elected in the year after the presidential election and one is elected in the year before it. There is also an elected township fiscal officer, who serves a four-year term beginning on April 1 of the year after the election, which is held in November of the year before the presidential election. Vacancies in the fiscal officer ship or on the board of trustees are filled by the remaining trustees.

== Education ==
Students within Bloomfield Township attend Bloomfield High School and the Bloomfield-Mespo School District. High school students are permitted to attend Trumbull Career and Technical Center as an alternative to their home school.
