= Cardinal Local School District =

School district in Ohio, United States

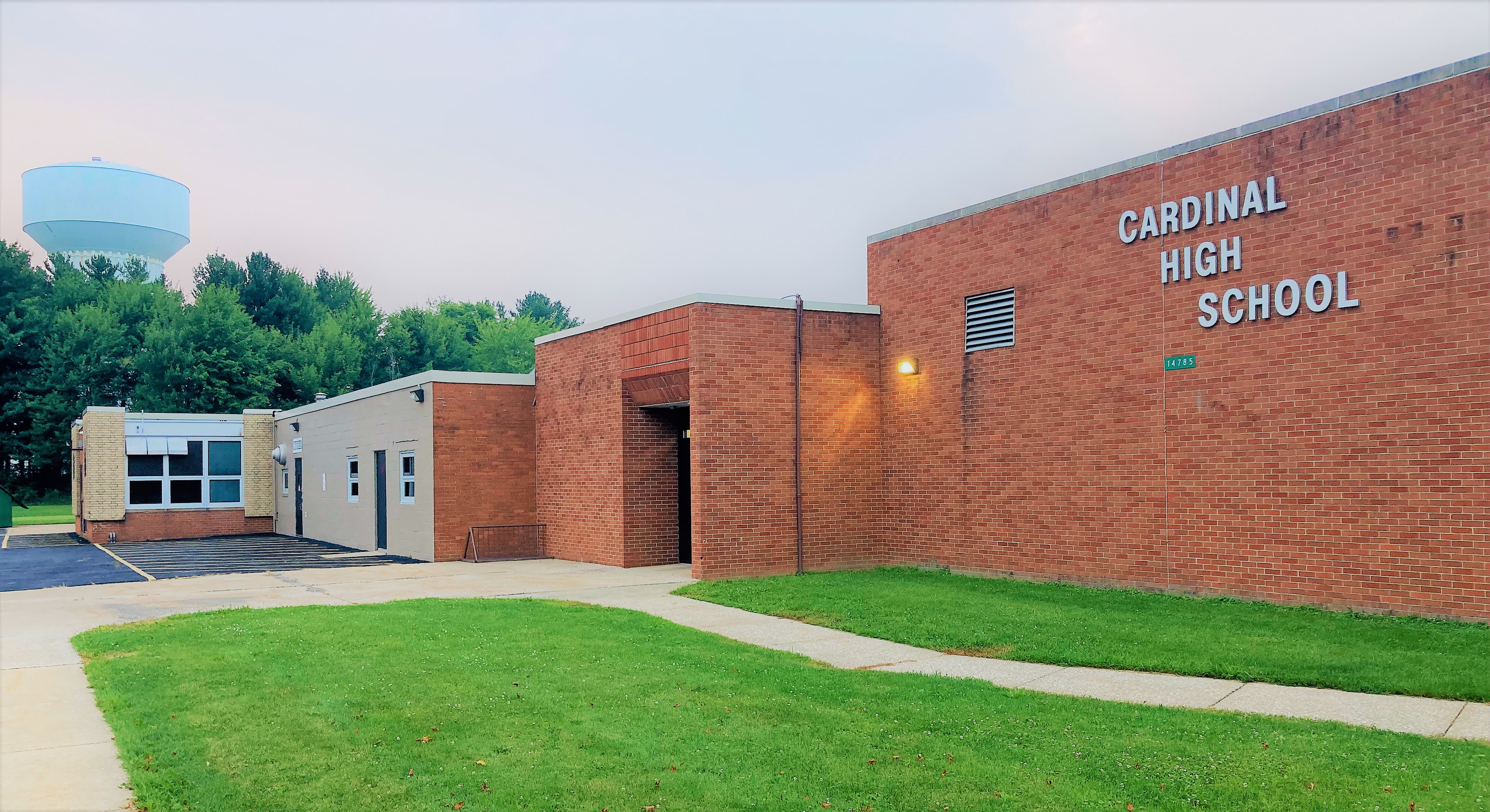
- Cardinal High School

Address
- PO Box 188 Middlefield, Ohio, 44062; United States

District information
- Type: Public
- Grades: PK–12
- Established: 1961
- NCES District ID: 3904717

Students and staff
- Enrollment: 733 (2024–25)
- Faculty: 40.83 (on an FTE basis)
- Student–teacher ratio: 17.95

Other information
- Website: www.cardinalschools.org

The Cardinal Local School District is a school district located in southeastern Geauga County, Ohio. The district serves students in grades PreK-12 living in Middlefield, Huntsburg, Parkman and a small portion of Mesopotamia townships. The district consists of one high school, one middle school and one elementary school. All offices and buildings are located in Middlefield.

== History ==
The Cardinal Local School District was formed following the consolidation of nearby high schools such as Middlefield, Huntsburg and Parkman in 1957.

Cardinal High School was built in 1961, with additions to the buildings in 1967 and 1980. Cardinal Middle School was opened in 2002, with the consolidation of Huntsburg, Parkman and Middlefield elementary buildings.

== Schools ==
=== High school ===
- Cardinal High School

=== Middle school ===
- Cardinal Middle School

=== Elementary school ===
- Cardinal Elementary School

=== Former schools ===
- Huntsburg Elementary School
- Parkman Elementary School
- Middlefield School
