= Newbury Center, Ohio =

Unincorporated community in Ohio, U.S.

Coordinates: 41°27′48″N 81°14′39″W

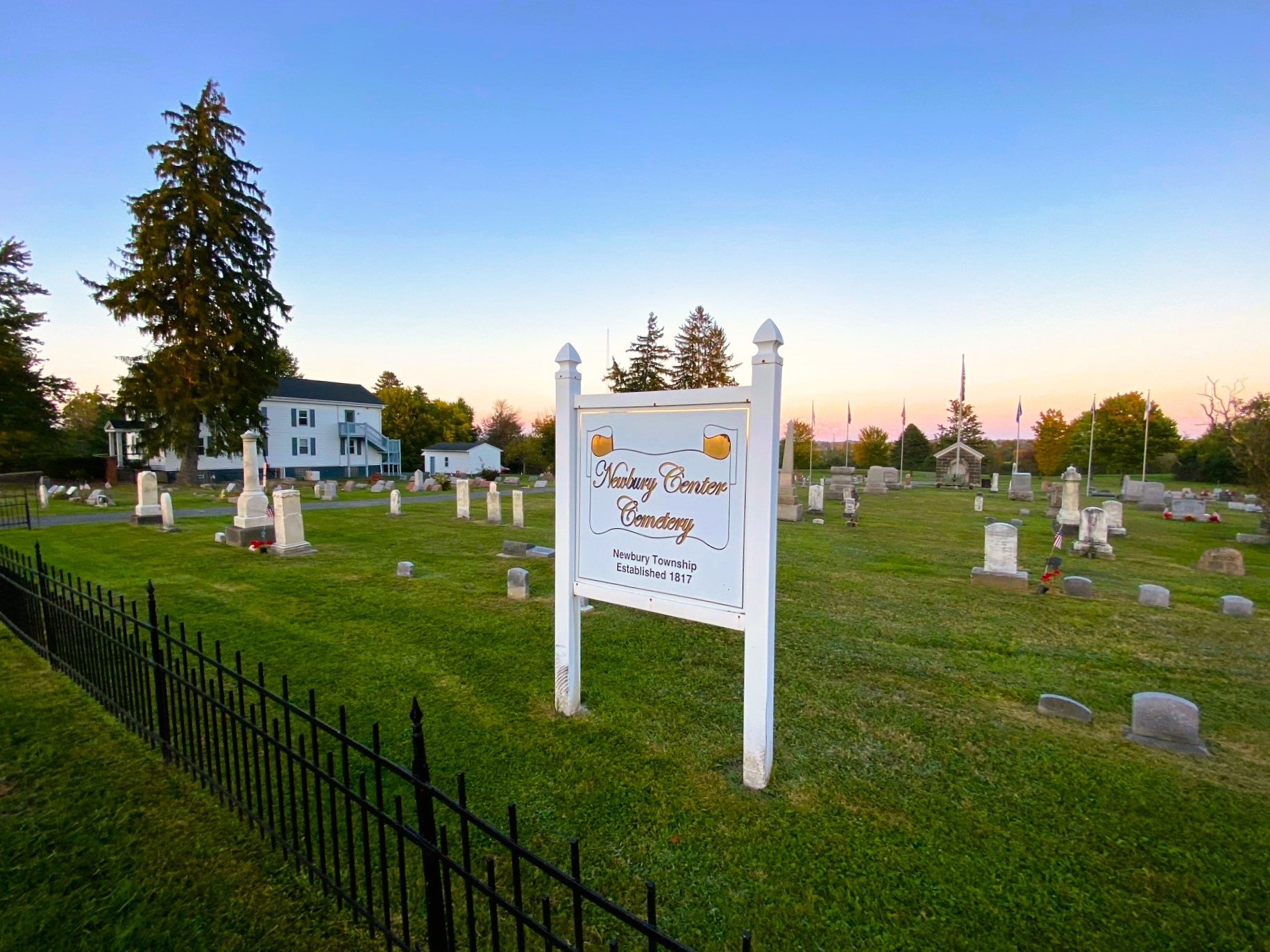
Newbury Center Cemetery

Newbury Center is an unincorporated community in Geauga County, in the U.S. state of Ohio. As the name suggests, it is located in the center of Newbury Township. Newbury Center is part of Greater Cleveland and the larger Cleveland–Akron–Canton Combined Statistical Area.

== History ==
A variant name is Newbury. A post office called Newbury has been in operation since 1823. The name Newbury is derived from Newburyport, Massachusetts.

== Education ==
Newbury is part of the West Geauga Local School District, which includes West Geauga High School, based in bordering Chester Township. Prior to 2020, it was served by the Newbury Local School District, which operated Newbury High School in Newbury Center.

== Notable people ==
- Coyote Peterson, YouTube personality and wildlife educator
