= Saint John School (Ashtabula, Ohio) =

Saint John School (SJS)

Location
- 7911 Depot Rd; Ashtabula, Ohio; Ashtabula (Saybrook Township), Ashtabula County, Ohio 44004-5707; United States; 41°49′34″N 80°52′19″W

Information
- School type: Private, Coeducational Catholic
- Religious affiliation: Roman Catholic
- Opened: September, 1953
- Founder: Fr. Joseph Feicht
- Status: Active
- School district: Ashtabula Area City Schools
- President: Maureen Burke
- Principal: Scott Plescia
- Grades: PK–12
- Enrollment: 392 (2023-24)
- Colors: Navy and White
- Athletics conference: Northeastern Athletic Conference
- Nickname: Fighting Heralds
- Website: https://www.sjheralds.org/

Saint John School is a private, Catholic, PK-12 school located in Saybrook Township, Ashtabula County, Ohio. They are known as the Heralds, and contest as a member of the Ohio High School Athletic Association It is also a member of the Northeastern Athletic Conference. Saint John school is affiliated by the Roman Catholic Diocese of Youngstown.

== History ==
In September, 1865, Ashtabula Parish, Saint Joseph Parish, opened an elementary school In 1897, the Holy Humility of Mary Sisters became the leaders of the program.

In 1890, in response to the rapidly growing population of the Ashtabula Harbor area, the Mother of Sorrows Parish was established. At the same time, Mother of Sorrows School was also opened. The founding principal was Miss Mary Cox.

In the early 1950s, the Diocese of Youngstown responded to the needs of the Ashtabula area and recognized the need for a Catholic high school in the area. The Saint John High School building was opened in September, 1953. Meanwhile, the Station Avenue School was used for elementary classes from 1890-1952.

On November 5, 1953, the formal dedication was delayed after most the high school building was destroyed by a fire. The building was rebuilt and reopened in September of 1954.

In 1992, the Roman Catholic Diocese of Youngstown made the decision to close Saint John High School due to declining enrollment and financial struggles. The surrounding community made an effort to raise enough money to pay off the schools debt. They then bought Saint John from the Catholic Diocese for $100 and reopened it in the fall of 1992 as an independent catholic high school.

In 1997, the consolidation of all catholic schools within the Ashtabula County area took place, and Saint John was once again reopened under the Roman Catholic Diocese of Youngstown.

In 2012, the school's current location on Depot Rd, was purchased by the community and alumni to house the entire Saint John PK-12 student body, and has remained at its location ever since.

Through 2024-2025, Saint John School launched an expansion program, which included several new classrooms, an assistant principals office, and a second dining hall. The project was completed in mid-2025.

== Accreditation and curriculum ==
The school is a PK-12 Youngstown Diocesan school accredited by the State of Ohio, through the Ohio Catholic Schools Accreditation Association.

The curriculum includes advanced academic opportunities available through Ohio's Post-Secondary Options Program at Kent State University, Ashtabula and Lakeland Community College. Advanced Placement (AP) high school classes are offered in English, Social Studies and Spanish.

== Athletics ==
As of May, 2026, Saint John School currently offers:

- Baseball
- Basketball
- Bowling
- Cross Country
- Cheerleading
- Football
- Golf
- Soccer
- Softball
- Track and Field
- Tennis
- Volleyball

=== Ohio High School Athletic Association state championships ===
- Baseball - 1983

== Notable alumni ==
- Urban Meyer - former NFL and college football head coach
- O. James Lighthizer - former legislator and Secretary of the Maryland Department of Transportation
- Larry Obhof - attorney and former Ohio Senate President
- Robert Bobroczkyi - Romanian-Hungarian actor and former basketball player
- John Spano - former owner of the New York Islanders and convicted felon
