= Luther F. Gilson =

American politician

Luther Frisbie Gilson (January 1, 1829 – July 14, 1890) was an American businessman and politician.

Gilson was born in Middlefield, Geauga County, Ohio. He went to the Geauga County public schools. In 1846, he moved to Racine, Wisconsin Territory. He then lived in Washington County, Wisconsin from 1858 to 1865. Gilson lived in Ohio from 1865 to 1871. In 1871, Gilson moved to Milwaukee, Wisconsin and was in the insurance business. Gilson served on the Milwaukee School Board and was a Republican. He served in the Wisconsin Assembly in 1880 and 1881. Gilson died at his home in Milwaukee, Wisconsin from a brief illness.
