= Cardinal High School =

Public high school in Middlefield, Ohio, United States

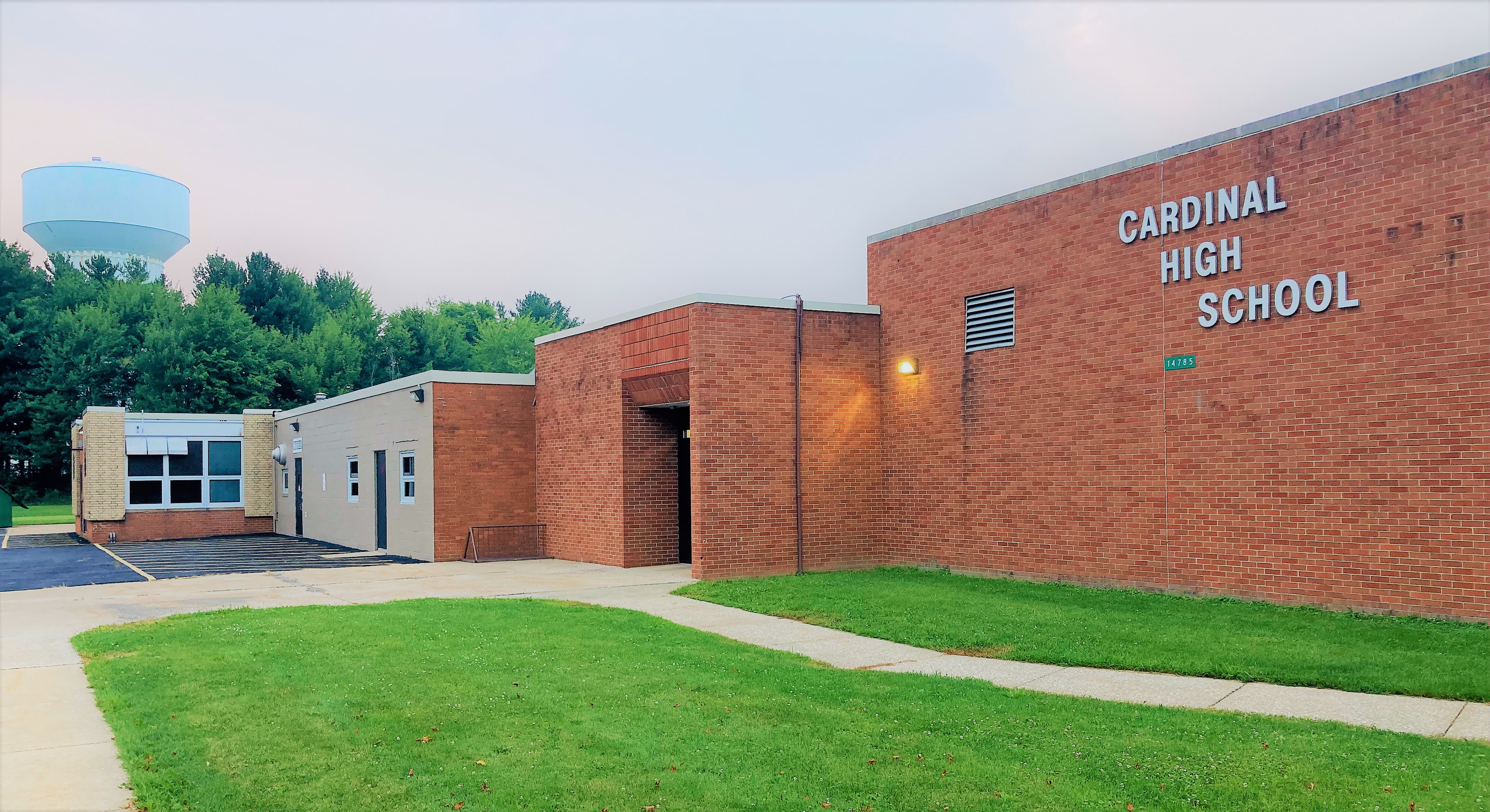

Location
- 14785 Thompson Avenue; Middlefield, Ohio 44062; United States
- Coordinates: 41°27′57″N 81°4′2″W

Information
- Type: Public, Coeducational high school
- Opened: 1961
- School district: Cardinal Local School District
- Superintendent: Jack Cunningham
- Principal: Jim Henson
- Teaching staff: 19.54 (FTE)
- Grades: 9-12
- Enrollment: 331 (2024-2025)
- Student to teacher ratio: 16.94
- Colors: Red, Black, & White
- Athletics conference: Northeastern Athletic Conference
- Team name: Huskies
- Website: School Website

Cardinal High School is a public high school in Middlefield, Ohio. It is the only high school in the Cardinal Local School District. Their nickname is the Huskies, and they compete in the Northeastern Athletic Conference as a member of the Ohio High School Athletic Association.

== History ==
Opened 1961 in Cardinal High School serves students grades 9-12.

Cardinal High School was formed following the consolidation of nearby high schools such as Middlefield, Huntsburg and Parkman in 1961.

Cardinal High School is currently located at Thompson Ave, where it houses students' grades 7-12.

== Athletics ==
Cardinal High School currently offers:

- Baseball
- Basketball
- Cheerleading
- Cross Country
- Golf
- Football
- Track and Field
- Soccer
- Softball
- Volleyball
- Wrestling

=== Ohio High School Athletic Association State Championships ===
- Wrestling – 1978
