= Adele E. Thompson =

American writer

- Born: Adele Eugenia Thompson; July 7, 1849; Middlefield, Ohio, U.S.
- Died: April 4, 1929 (aged 79); Middlefield, Ohio, U.S.
- Occupation(s): Writer, clubwoman
- Notable work: Polly of the Pines (1906)

Adele Eugenia Thompson (July 7, 1849 – April 4, 1929) was an American writer, based in Ohio, best known for a series of historical novels for young readers.

== Biography ==
Thompson was born in Middlefield, Ohio, the daughter of James Madison Thompson and Phebe S. Tracy Thompson. Thompson wrote historical novels for girls, often with young American heroines. She was president of the Cleveland Writers' Club, later known as the Cleveland Women's Press Club. She was a member of the Daughters of the American Revolution. Thompson died in 1929, at the age of 79. Some of her papers are in the Thompson Family Papers, Western Reserve Historical Society.

== Publications ==
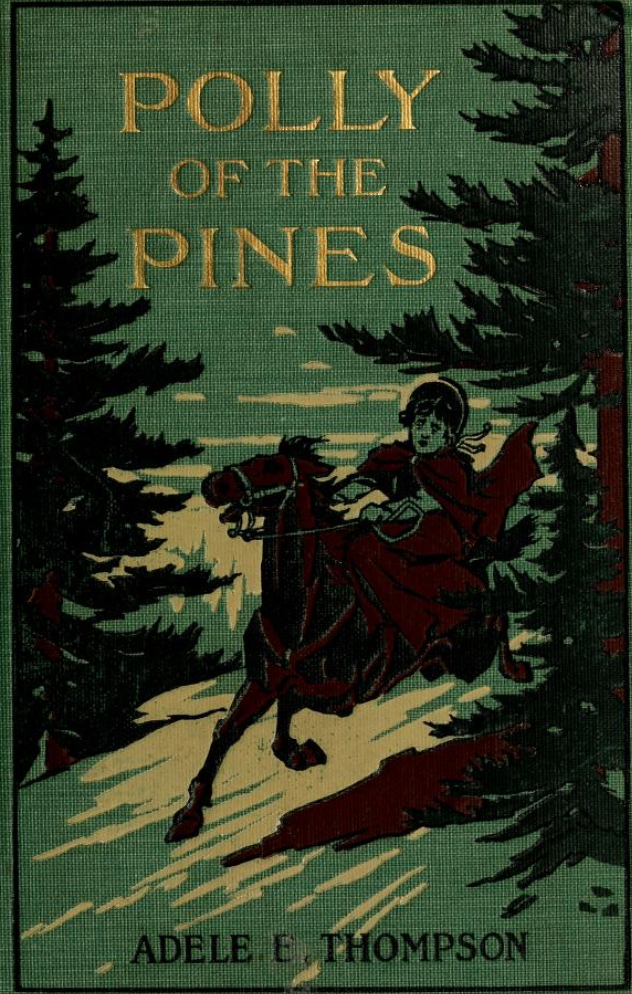
Cover of Thompson's Polly of the Pines (1906)

=== Books ===
- Beck's Fortune: A Story of School and Seminary Life (1899, illustrated by Louis Meynell)
- Betty Seldon, Patriot (1901, illustrated by Lillian Crawford True)
- Brave Heart Elizabeth (1902, illustrated by Lillian Crawford True)
- A Lassie of the Isles (1903, illustrated by J. W. Kennedy), a retelling of the Flora MacDonald story
- Polly of the Pines: A Patriot Girl of the Carolinas (1906, illustrated by Henry Roth)
- American Patty: A Story of 1812 (1909)
- Nobody's Rose; or, the Girlhood of Rose Shannon (1911)
- Fritz and the Secret Passage (1913, illustrated by Blanche Fisher Wright)

=== Shorter works ===
- "Pioneer Women of Middlefield" (1896)
- "Washington and the Ohio" (1899)
- "The Lily Boy's Cure" (1901)
- "A Pair of Apostates" (1901)
- "The Faith of Washington" (1902)
- "The Shadow that Came Between" (1902, also published under the title "A Jealous Wife")
- "Ye Pumpion Pye" (1902)
- "Different Greetings When People Meet" (1919)
