= Pymatuning Valley Local School District =

School district in Ohio, United States

Pymatuning Valley School District

Address
- PO Box 1180 Andover, Ohio, 44003; United States

District information
- Type: Public
- Grades: PreK–12
- NCES District ID: 3904588

Students and staff
- Students: 1,103 (2024-25)
- Staff: 71.77 (FTE)
- Student–teacher ratio: 15.37

Other information
- Website: www.pvschools.org

The Pymatuning Valley School District is a school district in Andover, Ohio, United States, the school district serves one high school, one middle school and one elementary school.

== History ==
The Pymatuning Valley School District was created in 1961 in Andover, Ohio when the school districts in Andover, Richmond Township, Williamsfield and New Lyme Deming merged into one district. Its mascot has been the "Lakers", a reference to the proximity of Pymatuning Reservoir.

In 2010, the BOE voted to consolidate Pierpont and Pymatuning Valley schools, expanding the district.

== Schools ==
Schools within the school district consists of

=== High School ===
- Pymatuning Valley High School

=== Middle School ===
- Pymatuning Valley Middle School

=== Elementary School ===
- Pymatuning Valley Primary School
