= Grand Valley High School =

Public school in Ohio, United States

Location
- 111 Grand Valley Avenue West; Orwell, Ohio 44076; United States
- 41°32′41″N 80°52′17″W

Information
- Type: Public, coeducational
- School district: Grand Valley Local School District
- Superintendent: William R. Nye Jr.
- Principal: Nickolas Rubesich
- Teaching staff: 21.74 (FTE)
- Grades: 9-12
- Student to teacher ratio: 12.60
- Colors: Royal Blue, Navy Blue, White, and Grey
- Athletics conference: Northeastern Athletic Conference
- Team name: Mustangs
- Website: www.grand-valley.k12.oh.us

Grand Valley High School is a public high school in Orwell, Ohio. It is the only high school in the Grand Valley Local School District. Their nickname is the Mustangs in the Ohio High School Athletic Association as a member of the Northeastern Athletic Conference.

== History ==
Grand Valley High School serves students grades 9-12.

Grand Valley High School was formed following the consolidation of various schools within the area sometime in the mid to late 50s-60s.

In 2005, Grand Valleys High School current campus was built on Grand Valley Ave, along with a new football stadium and an 8-lane outdoor track.

== Academics ==
Over 1,400 students attend classes in one elementary, one middle, and one high school, all located on one campus. Special features of the elementary curriculum include instruction in art, music, and physical education.

Parents and community members have provided active support of P.T.O.s, Athletic Boosters, Band Boosters, Academic Boosters, Choir Boosters, and Drama Boosters, as well as individual school-sponsored activities and programs. The district has a P-12 244,000 sq. ft. facility which is situated on 94.6 acres completed in August 2005. A football stadium and track facility complete with an eight-lane weather track adjacent to the new school opened in August 2006.

== Athletics ==
Grand Valley High School currently offers:

- Baseball
- Basketball
- Cheerleading
- Cross Country
- Golf
- Football
- Soccer
- Softball
- Track and field
- Volleyball
