= Geauga County Airport =

Public use airport in Middlefield, Ohio

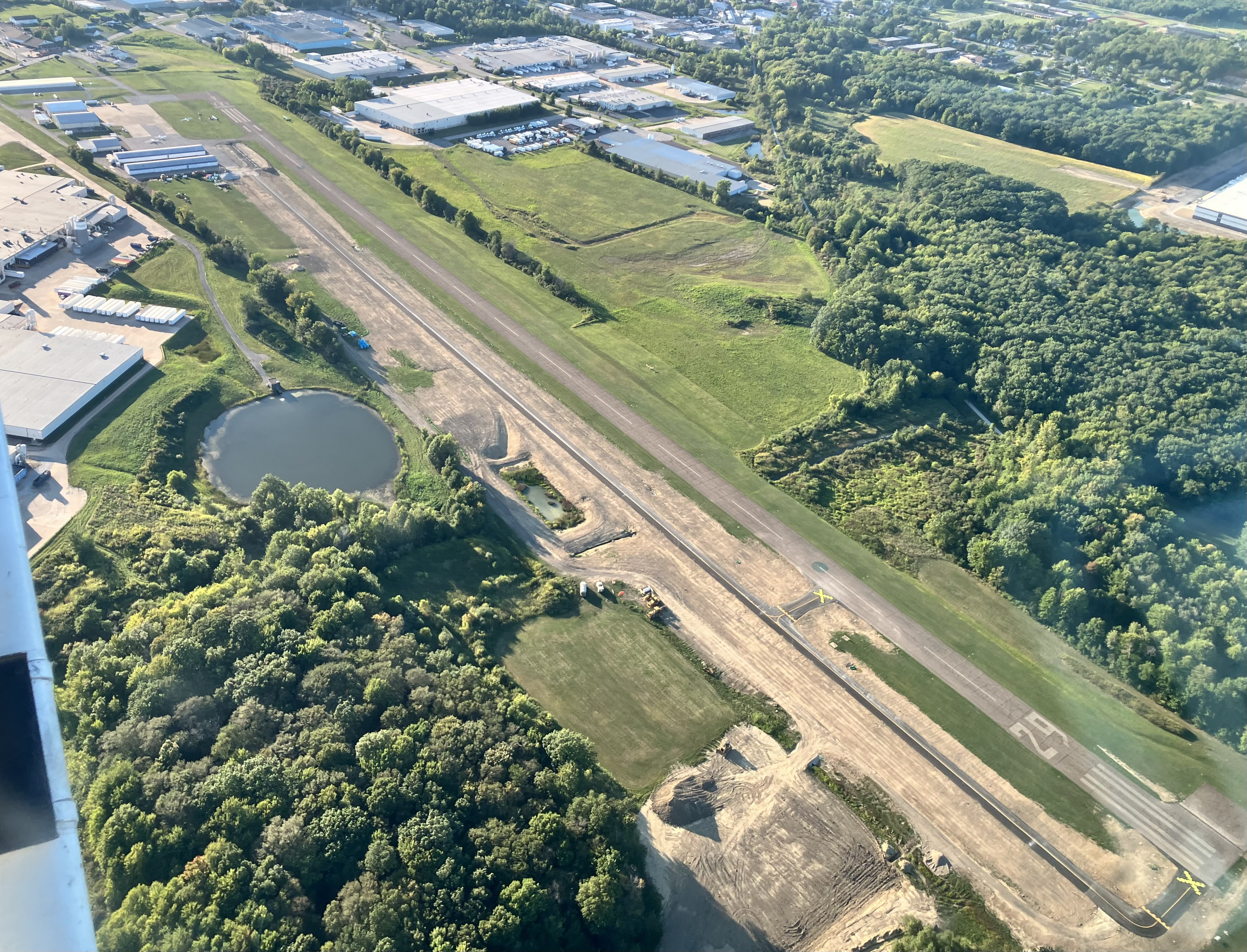
- Aerial photograph of the airport from 1,000 ft
- IATA: none; ICAO: none; FAA LID: 7G8

Summary
- Airport type: Public
- Owner/Operator: Geauga County
- Serves: Middlefield, Ohio
- Location: Middlefield
- Opened: September 29, 1968
- Time zone: UTC−05:00 (-5)
  - Summer (DST): UTC−04:00 (-4)
- Elevation AMSL: 1,174.2 ft (357.9 m)
- Coordinates: 41°27′03″N 081°04′15″W
- Website: Official website

Maps
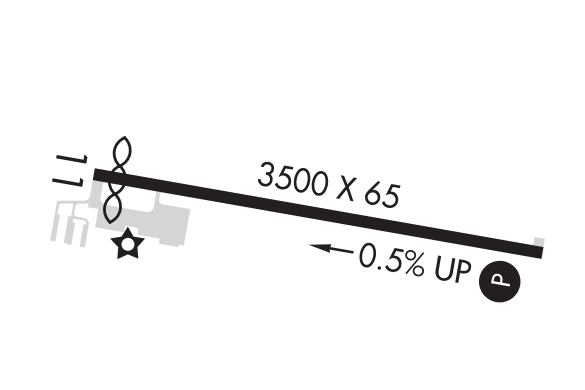
- Airport sketch

- Location of airport in Ohio 7G8 (the United States)

Runways
Direction	Length		Surface
Direction	ft	m	Surface
11/29	3,500	1,067	Asphalt

Statistics (2023)
- Aircraft operations: 20,805
- Based aircraft: 42

Geauga County Airport (FAA LID: 7G8), is a public use airport in southern Geauga County, Ohio, United States. Owned and operated by Geauga County since 1968, it serves all of Geauga County. The airport is located one nautical mile (1.2 mi; 1.9 km) southeast of Middlefield's central business district.

The airport serves as the area base for University Hospitals' AirMed 1 medical helicopter, as well as for The Cleveland Soaring Society, a glider club. It is home to Experimental Aircraft Association Chapter 5, which holds regular social events at the airport.

== History ==
The airport was built in 1968 as part of a statewide initiative launched by governor Jim Rhodes for each county to have its own airport. It opened with a 3,500 ft (1,100 m) runway on 29 September 1968. Four DC-3s stored at the airport were put up for auction by Galaxy Airlines in late September 1969. By mid October 1974, a series of improvements had been made to the airport's only hangar at the time by Firebird Aviation.

Representative Diane Grendell sued the state legislature in 1999 for not providing $30,000 in funding to the airport. Later that year, a grant for the purchase of a nearby gas station was rejected by the airport authority after it was discovered to have been submitted without their awareness.

In 2003, a proposal to extend the runway by 1,080 ft (330 m) was opposed by local Amish farmers who worried an expansion would harm their farms.

Plans for 18 new t-hangars were postponed in July 2009 due to owners selling aircraft as a result of economic conditions and therefore eliminating a waiting list.

The airport opened a parallel taxiway and broke ground on a new t-hangar in 2025.

== Facilities and aircraft ==
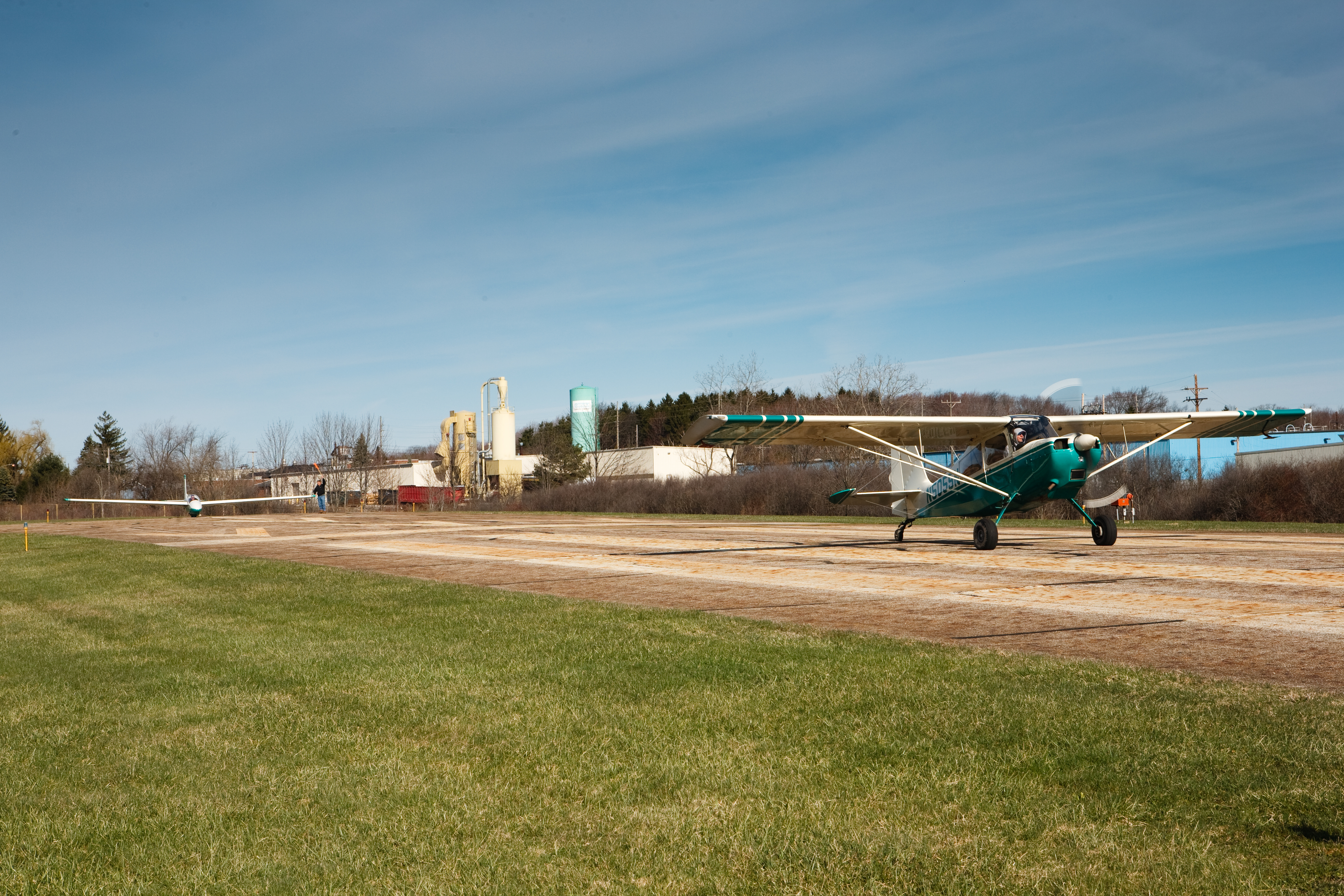
An airplane and glider on the runway at Geauga County Airport.

The airport has one runway, designated as runway 11/29. It measures 3500 x 65 ft (1067 x 20 m) and is paved with asphalt.

The airport has a fixed-base operator that sells fuel.

In 2022, the airport received a $230,000 grant to purchase land in order to build more runways.

For the 12-month period ending June 29, 2023, the airport had 20,805 aircraft operations, an average of 57 per day: 94% general aviation, 4% air taxi, and 2% military. At that time there were 42 aircraft based at this airport: 34 single-engine and 2 multi-engine airplanes, 5 gliders, and 1 helicopter.

== Accidents and incidents ==
- On 30 April 1972, a homebuilt aircraft crashed after taking off from the airport, killing the pilot.
- On 19 April 1982, a Cessna 411 crashed near the airport, killing five occupants.
- On October 4, 2007, a Cessna 182 Skylane received substantial damage on impact with terrain during an instructional flight. The student and flight instructor onboard were attempting a short field landing when the airplane touched down "a few feet" short of runway 29 in a "near level" attitude during the short field landing attempt. Both pilots reported there had been a "sudden loss of lift due to mechanical turbulence from trees" during the approach. The probable cause of the accident was found to be the student pilot's failure to obtain the proper touchdown point and the instructor's inadequate supervision during the landing.
- On November 1, 2009, an experimental L-13 Blanik glider sustained substantial damage when it impacted terrain after it released the tow line about 200 feet above ground level during takeoff climb from the Geauga County Airport. The flight instructor onboard noticed the tow plane wave off the glider and took control of the aircraft from the student. The glider released from the tow and attempted a 180° turn baco to the airport. The instructor lowered the nose to increase aircraft energy, but the student pilot grabbed the controls and pulled back on the stick. The instructor could not overpower the student on the controls and the airplane started to spin left. The instructor picked up the left wing by applying opposite rudder. The probable cause of the accident was found to be the student pilot's improper control inputs which resulted in the inadvertent stall of the glider.
- On May 28, 2019, a Piper Cherokee crashed while approaching the Geauga County Airport. Witnesses reported that the engine sounded erratic.
- On January 18, 2023, a Piper PA-31 Navajo crashed while attempting an emergency landing that the Geauga County Airport. The aircraft reported engine troubles. A federal inmate from Youngstown and four officers were en route to Willow Run Airport near Detroit when the accident occurred. The preliminary NTSB report indicated oil was leaking from the righthand engine when it failed. Though the airport made it to the airport safely, the pilot determined he could not land in the distance remaining on the runway and decided to overrun the landing surface instead of going around. The accident investigation is still underway.

== See also ==
- List of airports in Ohio
