= Chesterland, Ohio =

- Census-designated place
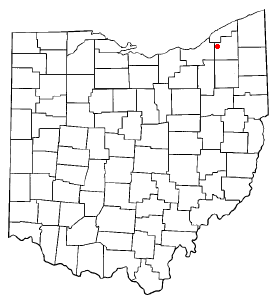
- Location of Chesterland, Ohio
- Coordinates: 41°31′38″N 81°21′55″W
- Country: United States
- State: Ohio
- County: Geauga
- Township: Chester

Area
  - Total: 14.09 sq mi (36.48 km^{2})
  - Land: 14.02 sq mi (36.32 km^{2})
  - Water: 0.062 sq mi (0.16 km^{2})
- Elevation: 1,211 ft (369 m)

Population (2020)
  - Total: 7,074
  - Density: 504.5/sq mi (194.77/km^{2})
- Time zone: UTC-5 (Eastern (EST))
  - Summer (DST): UTC-4 (EDT)
- ZIP code: 44026
- Area code: 440
- FIPS code: 39-14100
- GNIS feature ID: 2393375

Chesterland is a census-designated place (CDP) in Geauga County, Ohio, United States. As of the 2020 census, the CDP had a population of 7,074.

== History ==
A post office called "Chester Cross Roads" was established in 1826, and the name was changed to "Chesterland" in 1898. Chesterland derives its name from Chester, Massachusetts.

== Geography ==
Chesterland is in northwestern Geauga County slightly to the southeast of the center of Chester Township.

According to the United States Census Bureau, the CDP has a total area of 4.4 square miles (11.4 km^{2}), of which 0.02 square miles (0.04 km^{2}), or 0.32%, is water.

The town center of Chesterland is located at the intersection of U.S. Route 322 and State Route 306. US-322 leads east 24 miles (39 km) to Orwell and west 19 miles (31 km) to downtown Cleveland, while SR 306 leads north 8 miles (13 km) to the center of Kirtland and south 9 miles (14 km) to Bainbridge. The commercial district of Chesterland spans out from this intersection in all directions.

Chesterland is part of the Chagrin Valley area, which is defined by the cities and villages along the Chagrin River.

== Demographics ==
Historical population
| Census | Pop. | Note | %± |
|---|---|---|---|
| 2020 | 7,074 | | — |
U.S. Decennial Census

As of the census of 2010, the population was 2,521, including 990 households, and 685 families residing in the CDP. The population density was 573.0 inhabitants per square mile (221.2/km^{2}). There were 1,052 housing units at an average density of 239.1 per square mile (92.3/km^{2}). The racial makeup of the CDP was 97.6% White, 0.9% African American, 0.4% Asian, and 1.0% from two or more races. Hispanic or Latino of any race were 2.4% of the population.

There were 685 households with children, out of which 25.5% had children under the age of 18 living with them, 56.5% were married couples living together, 8.8% had a female householder with no husband present, and 30.8% were non-families. 25.8% of all households were made up of individuals, and 9.2% had someone living alone who was 65 years of age or older. The average household size was 2.50 and the average family size was 3.03.

In the CDP, the population was spread out, with 27.8% under the age of 18, and 19.8% who were 65 years of age or older. The median age was 46.7 years. For every 100 females, there were 93.5 males.

The median income for a household in the CDP was $55,781, and the median income for a family was $62,917. Males had a median income of $46,490 versus $33,079 for females. The per capita income for the CDP was $26,168. About 3.2% of families and 3.2% of the population were below the poverty line, including 1.8% of those under age 18 and 2.5% of those age 65 or over.

== Education ==
Chesterland lies entirely in the West Geauga School District, and shares this district with neighboring Russell Township. There are two elementary schools, one middle school, and one high school, West Geauga High School. A third elementary school, Chester Elementary, served the community for many years but closed in the 1980s.

Chesterland has a public library, a branch of the Geauga County Public Library.

== Notable person ==
- Rick Manning, Major League Baseball player and broadcaster
