= Maplewood Local School District =

Location
- 2414 Greenville Rd; Cortland, Ohio; United States
- Coordinates: 41.3904°N 80.7324°W

Information
- Type: Public
- NCES School ID: 3905021
- Teaching staff: 46.54 (FTE)
- Grades: K-12
- Enrollment: 601 (2024-25)
- Student to teacher ratio: 12.91
- Colors: Blue and white
- Mascot: Rockets
- Website: Maplewood High School

The Maplewood Local School District is a school district located in Mecca Township, Trumbull County, Ohio, United States. The district serves one high school, and one elementary school.

== History ==
The Maplewood Local School District formed in 1961, when Mecca, Johnston and Greene township schools consolidated into one school district.

Maplewood received $23 million in 2001, to make improvements to the schools within the district following the townships approval of a $3.898 million bond. 100,000 square feet was added to Maplewood North and South Elementary and the junior/senior high school. A new gymnasium and, additional classroom space, was added at East, along with renovations to the music room, computer and science labs. Following the construction, Maplewood would only utilize one high school, middle school and elementary school.

In 2017, due to declining enrollment, Maplewood Local Schools closed Greene Elementary, consolidating all elementary grades into the former middle school building in Johnston, while the high school expanded to include grades 7–12. The former elementary school was auctioned off in 2019 and has since been demolished.

== Schools ==
Schools within the district include

=== High School ===
- Maplewood High School

=== Elementary School ===
- Maplewood Elementary School

=== Former Schools ===
- Maplewood East Elementary School
- Maplewood North Elementary School
- Greene Elementary School
- Johnston Junior High School
