= Maplewood High School (Ohio) =

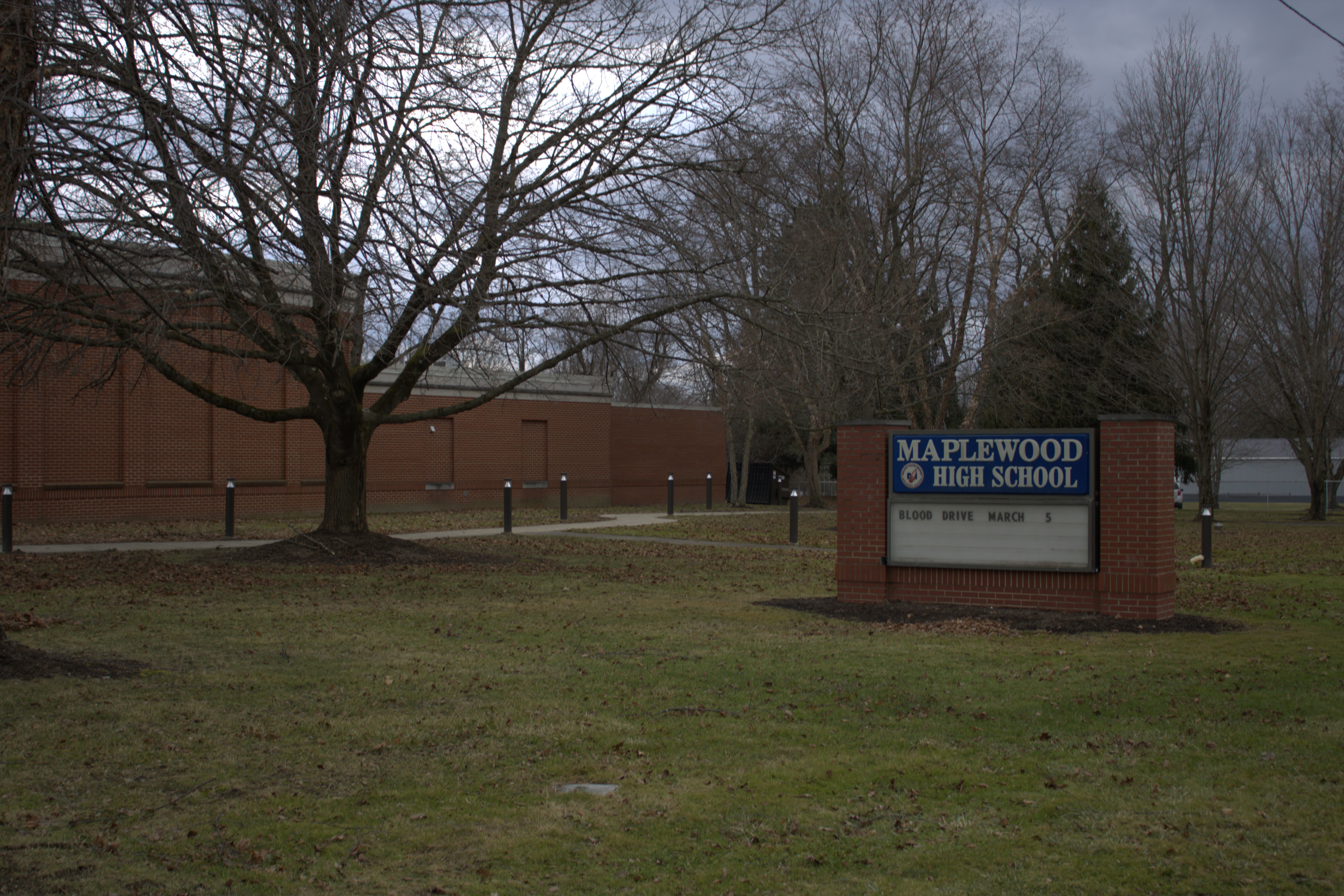
- Maplewood High School sign on RT. 88

Location
- 2414 Greenville Rd; Cortland, Ohio; United States; 41.3904°N 80.7324°W

Information
- Type: Public
- Established: 1961
- NCES School ID: 390502103877
- Principal: Gordon Hitchcock
- Teaching staff: 20.00 (on an FTE basis)
- Grades: 7–12
- Enrollment: 245 (2024–2025)
- Student to teacher ratio: 12.25
- Colors: Blue and white
- Athletics conference: Northeastern Athletic Conference
- Mascot: Rockets
- Website: Maplewood High School

Maplewood High School is a public high school in Mecca Township, Ohio, near Cortland, Ohio It is the only high school in the Maplewood Local School District. Their nickname is the Rockets. and they compete as a member of the Ohio High School Athletic Association and is a member of the Northeastern Athletic Conference.

== History ==
Maplewood High School was established in 1961, when the Johnston, Greene, and Mecca school systems formally merged to create the modern Maplewood Local School District.

Entering the 21st century, declining enrollment significantly impacted the structure of the high school. District officials reported a steady loss of students beginning around 2000, prompting discussions about restructuring facilities. As a result, in 2017, the district reinstated its original design of an elementary and a high school, which previously ended during the 2001-2002 school year.

== Athletics ==
Maplewood High School offers interscholastic sports as part of a partnership with community organizations. They are as follows:

=== State championships ===
- Boys track and field – 2000
- Boys cross country – 1972, 1997, 2002, 2003, 2005, 2014, 2015
