= Grand Valley Local School District =

School district in Ohio

Address
- 111 Grand Valley Ave West Orwell, Ohio, 44076; United States

District information
- Grades: K - 12
- NCES District ID: 3904586

Students and staff
- Enrollment: 814 (2024-25)
- Student–teacher ratio: 14.68

Other information
- Website: www.grand-valley.k12.oh.us

The Grand Valley Local School District is a public school district in Ashtabula County, Ohio, United States. The districts serves one high school, one middle school and one elementary school.

== History ==
The Grand Valley Local School District was formed following the consolidation of various schools within the area sometime in the mid to late 50s-60s.

in 2005, Grand Valleys High School current campus was built on Grand Valley Ave, along with a new football stadium and an 8-lane outdoor track.

== Schools ==
The Grand Valley Local School District has one elementary school, one middle school, and one high school.

=== High school ===
- Grand Valley High School

=== Middle school ===
- Grand Valley Middle School

=== Elementary school ===
- Grand Valley Elementary School
