= Pymatuning Valley High School =

Location
- 5571 US Route 6 West; Andover, (Ashtabula County), Ohio 44003; United States; 41°36′40″N 80°35′4″W

Information
- Type: Public, coeducational
- School district: Pymatuning Valley Local School District
- Superintendent: Christopher Edison
- Principal: Mark Mollohan
- Teaching staff: 24.00 (FTE)
- Grades: 9-12
- Student to teacher ratio: 14.88
- Colors: Maroon and Gold
- Athletics conference: Northeastern Athletic Conference
- Team name: Lakers
- Website: https://www.pvschools.org/Schools/High-School/index.html

Pymatuning Valley High School is a public high school in Andover, Ohio, Ashtabula County, Ohio. It is the only high school in the district. Their team name is the Lakers, their mascot is Louie the Laker Man and they compete as a member of the Ohio High School Athletic Association and is a member of the Northeastern Athletic Conference.

== Athletics ==
Pymatuning Valley currently offers:

- Baseball
- Basketball
- Cheerleading
- Cross country
- Football
- Girls flag football
- Golf
- Soccer
- Softball
- Track and field
- Volleyball
- Wrestling

=== Associated Press state championships ===
Girls basketball - 2014

== Extracurricular activities ==
Three AP Courses (English Literature, English Language, and Calculus), Dual-Credit Chemistry and Physics with Columbus State Community College, Dual-Credit American Government and U.S. History with Ashland University, FFA program, Student council, Class Officers, Botany team, Quiz Bowl, Marching Band, Concert Band, Jazz Band, Show Choir, Choir, Theater, Fellowship of Christian Athletes, Chess Club, Recycling Club, National Parks Class, Students Against Destructive Decisions, Students Making a Safer Highway, and the Ashtabula County Mentorship Program.
