= Chester Township, Geauga County, Ohio =

Township in Ohio, US

- Township
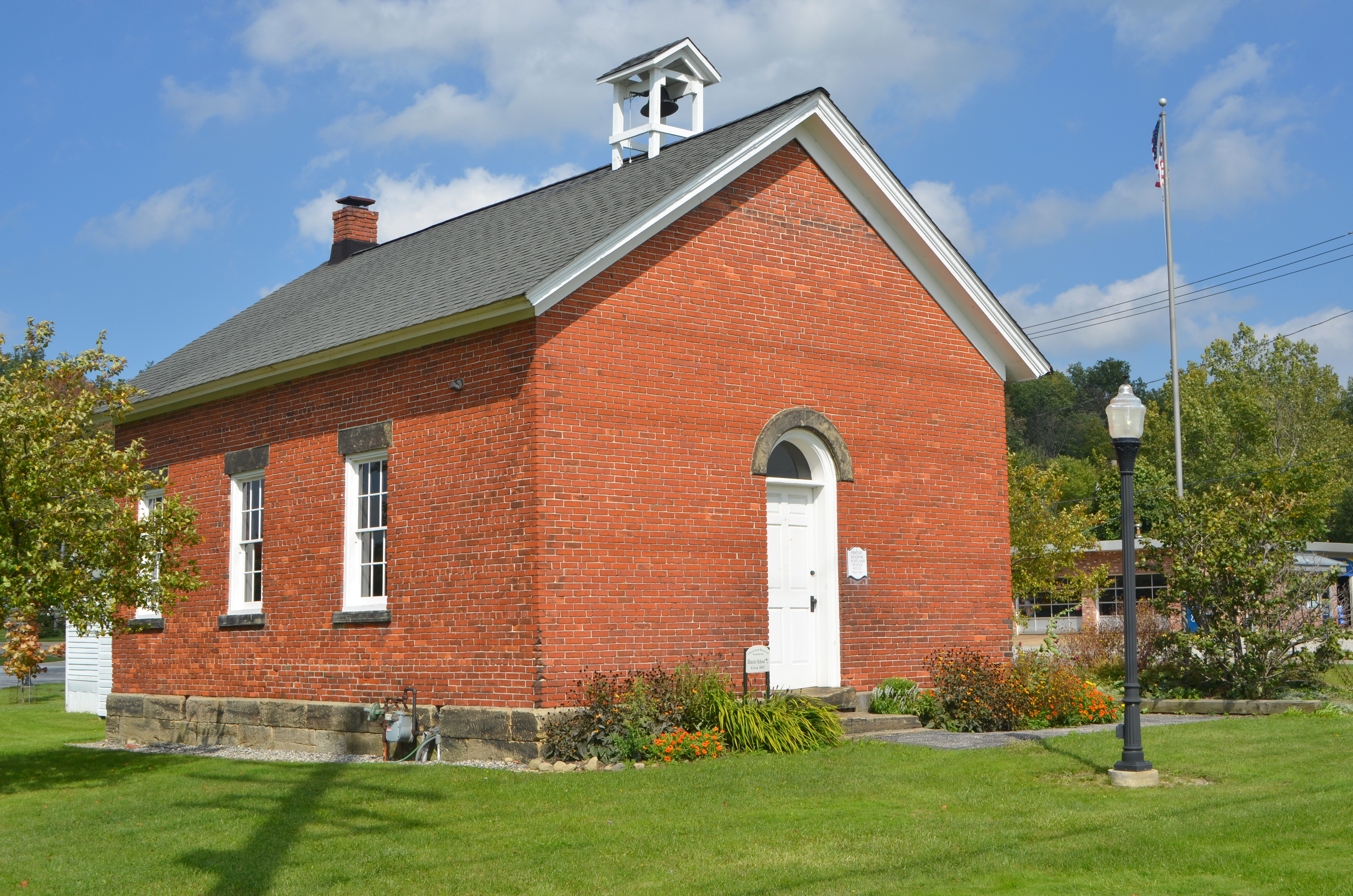
- Former Chester Township District School No. 2

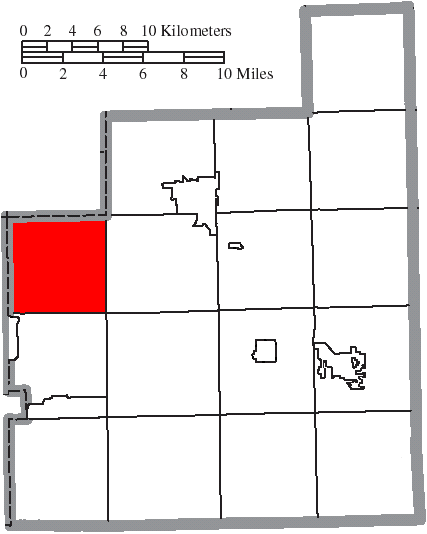
- Location of Chester Township in Geauga County
- Coordinates: 41°31′53″N 81°20′37″W
- Country: United States
- State: Ohio
- County: Geauga

Area
  - Total: 23.5 sq mi (60.9 km^{2})
  - Land: 23.4 sq mi (60.6 km^{2})
  - Water: 0.12 sq mi (0.3 km^{2})
- Elevation: 1,220 ft (372 m)

Population (2020)
  - Total: 9,957
  - Density: 426/sq mi (164/km^{2})
- Time zone: UTC-5 (Eastern (EST))
  - Summer (DST): UTC-4 (EDT)
- FIPS code: 39-13988
- GNIS feature ID: 1086151
- Website: www.chestertwp.com

Chester Township is one of the sixteen townships of Geauga County, Ohio, United States. As of the 2020 census the population was 9,957 .

== Geography ==
Located in the northwestern corner of the county, it borders the following townships and municipalities:

- Kirtland - north
- Chardon Township - northeast corner
- Munson Township - east
- Newbury Township - southeast corner
- Russell Township - south
- Hunting Valley - southwest corner
- Gates Mills - west
- Willoughby Hills - northwest corner

No municipalities are located in Chester Township, although the census-designated place of Chesterland is located in the township's center.

== Name and history ==
Chester Township was established in 1816.

It is one of five Chester Townships statewide. In the nineteenth century, it was home to the Geauga Seminary, a Free Will Baptist school, which President Garfield attended.

== Government ==
The township is governed by a three-member board of trustees, who are elected in November of odd-numbered years to a four-year term beginning on the following January 1. Two are elected in the year after the presidential election and one is elected in the year before it. There is also an elected township fiscal officer, who serves a four-year term beginning on April 1 of the year after the election, which is held in November of the year before the presidential election. Vacancies in the fiscal officership or on the board of trustees are filled by the remaining trustees.

== Notable people ==
- Fordyce R. Melvin, Wisconsin State Assemblyman, farmer, and businessman, was born in the township.
