= Newbury High School =

Location
- 14775 Auburn Road; Newbury, Ohio 44065; United States
- Coordinates: 41°27′57″N 81°14′36″W

Information
- Type: Public
- Opened: 1928
- Status: Closed, merged with West Geauga High School
- Closed: 2020
- School district: Newbury Local School District
- Grades: 9–12
- Colors: Orange and black
- Team name: Black Knights
- Website: www.newburyschools.org

Newbury High School was a public high school in Newbury Township, Geauga County, Ohio. It was the only high school in the Newbury Local School District. Athletic teams were known as the Black Knights. The school closed at the end of the 2019–20 school and students were sent to West Geauga High School as part of a merger between the Newbury Local School District and the West Geauga Local School District.

== History ==
Newbury High School opened in 1928 and served students grades 9-12. Talks first began in 2017 regarding a merger with the West Geauga Local School District. After months of discussions, Newbury voted against the idea at that time.

In 2019, however, Newbury's Board of Education decided to cease operations of the Newbury School District, citing declining enrollment and financial issues. At the conclusion of the 2019–20 academic year, the school executed a territory transfer into the West Geauga School District. Newbury had considered merging with Berkshire and Cardinal and also splitting their district between West Geauga and Berkshire. The high school building was demolished in 2022, despite efforts to acquire it back from West Geauga School District.

== Athletics ==
=== State championships ===
- Boys wrestling – 1986
