= Bloomfield-Mespo School District =

School district in Ohio

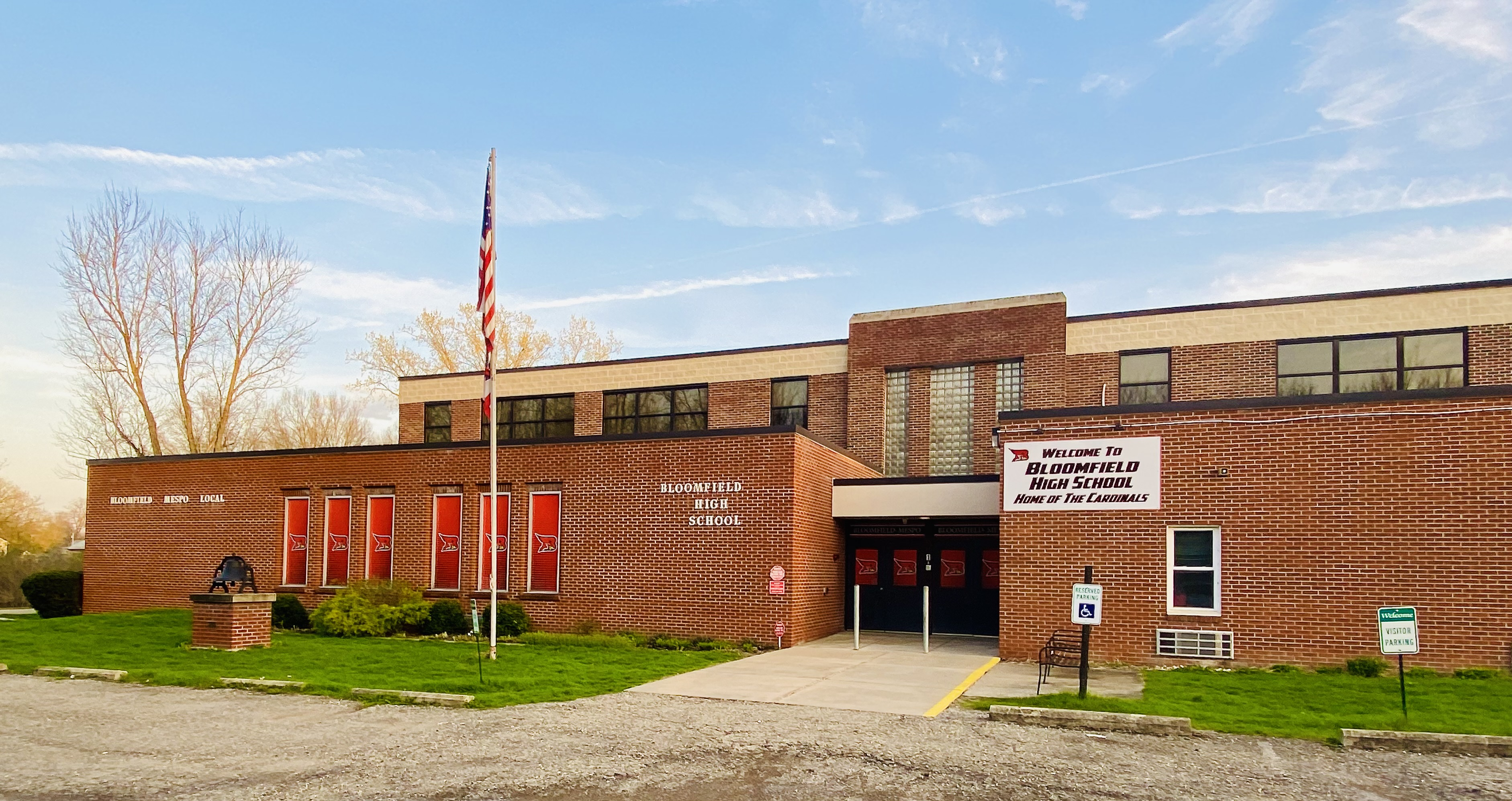

Location
- 2077 Park West Rd; North Bloomfield, Ohio 44450; United States

Information
- Type: Public
- Opened: 1968
- NCES District ID: 3905009
- Superintendent: Gregory C. Isler
- Teaching staff: 26.49 (FTE)
- Grades: K-12
- Gender: Coeducational
- Enrollment: 198 (2025-26)
- Student to teacher ratio: 7.47
- Colors: Red & black
- Team name: Cardinals
- Website: www.bloomfieldmesposchools.org

Bloomfield-Mespo School District is a school district located in Bloomfield Township, Trumbull County, Ohio, United States. The school district serves one junior/senior high school, and one elementary school.

== History ==
The Bloomfield-Mespo School District was formed following the consolidation of Bloomfield and Mesopotamia school districts. The high school was opened in 1968.

== Schools ==
=== High School ===
- Bloomfield Junior/Senior High School

=== Middle School ===
- Mesopotamia Elementary School
