= Andover, Ohio =

- Village
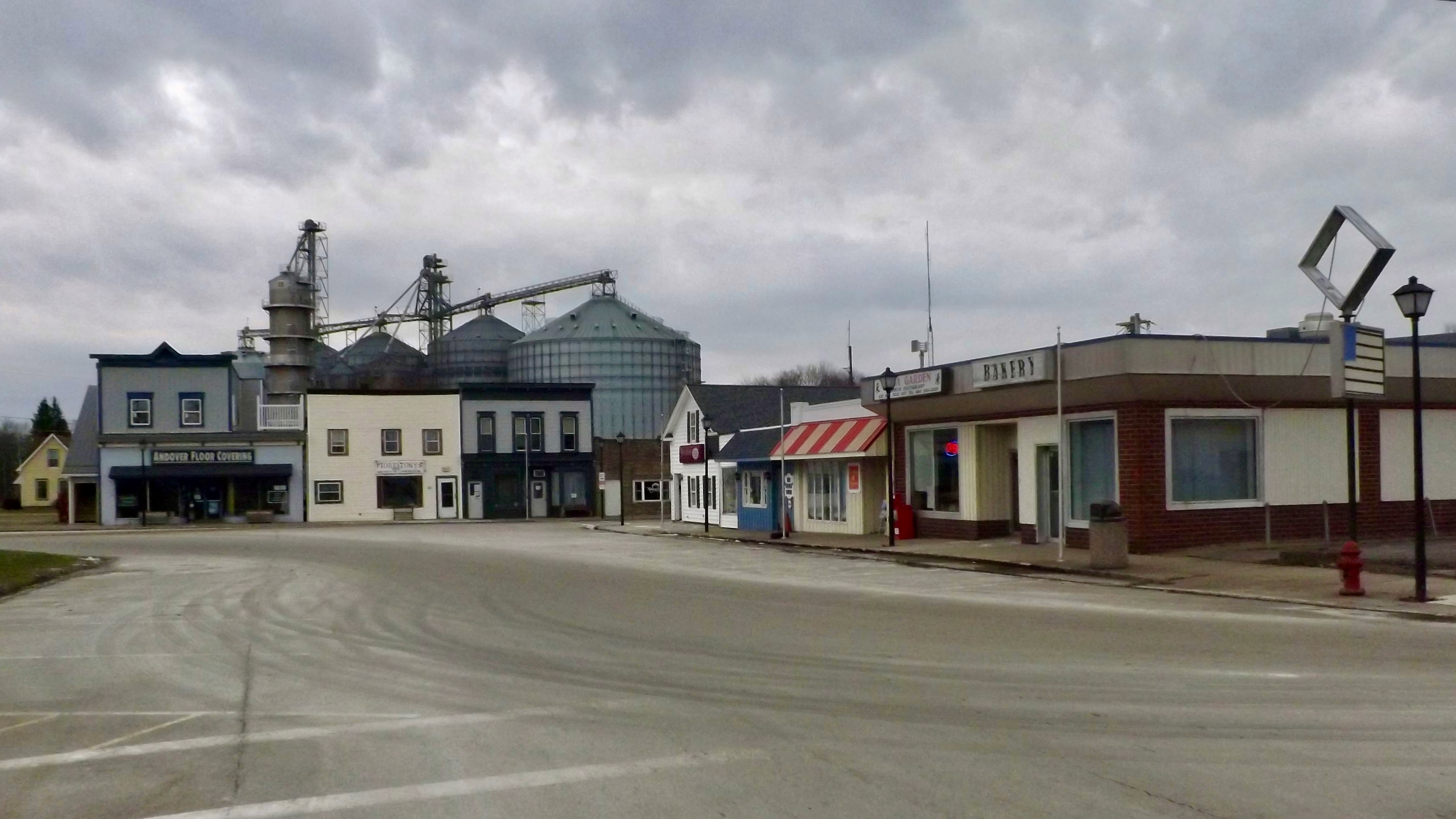
- Downtown Andover

- Flag Logo
- Motto: " Together For A Better Future "
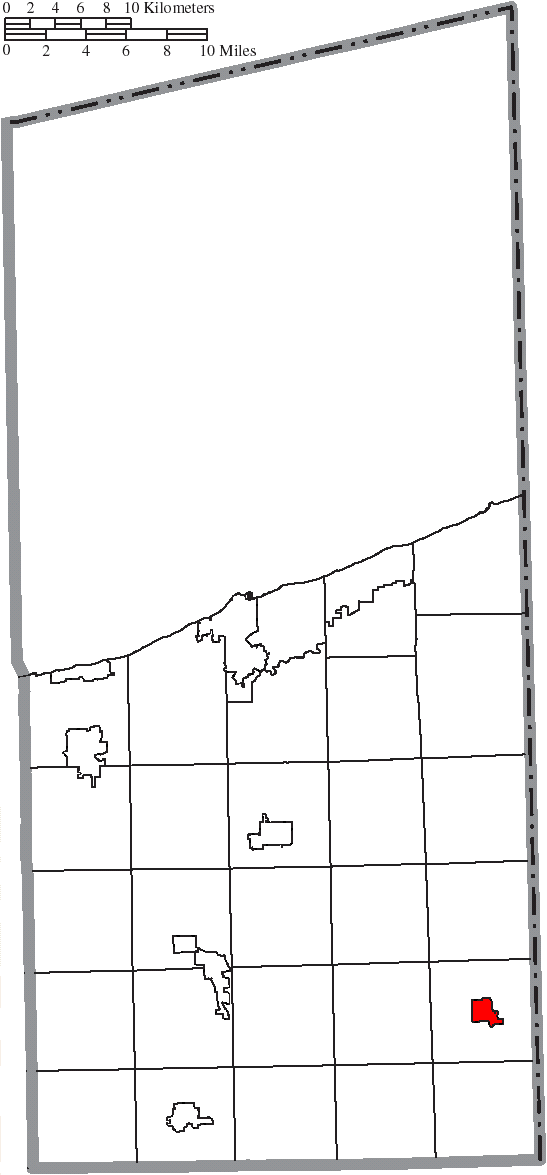
- Location of Andover in Ashtabula County

- Location within Ohio Location within the United States Location within North America
- Coordinates: 41°36′24″N 80°34′20″W
- Country: United States
- State: Ohio
- County: Ashtabula
- Township: Andover

Area
  - Total: 1.41 sq mi (3.65 km^{2})
  - Land: 1.41 sq mi (3.65 km^{2})
  - Water: 0 sq mi (0.00 km^{2})
- Elevation: 1,093 ft (333 m)

Population (2020)
  - Total: 972
  - Estimate (2023): 944
  - Density: 690.2/sq mi (266.49/km^{2})
- Time zone: UTC-5 (Eastern (EST))
  - Summer (DST): UTC-4 (EDT)
- ZIP code: 44003
- Area code: 440
- FIPS code: 39-02050
- GNIS feature ID: 1064328
- Website: andovervillage.com

Andover is a village located in the south-east of Ashtabula County, Ohio, United States. The population was 972 at the time of the 2020 census.

== History ==
David Lindsey, writing in 1955, observes that "New England Yankees, moving into Ohio's Western Reserve in 1798, brought with them the name Andover from a township in Tolland County, Connecticut, birthplace of many of the migrants. General Henry Champion, second largest shareholder in the Connecticut Land Company, first acquired Andover Township in the drawing for lands held at Hartford in 1798."

A post office named Sharon was established in 1815, and changed to Andover in 1826.

Andover was incorporated in 1883.

== Geography ==
According to the United States Census Bureau, the village has a total area of 1.37 square miles (3.55 km^{2}), all land.

== Demographics ==
Historical population
| Census | Pop. | Note | %± |
|---|---|---|---|
| 1890 | 733 | | — |
| 1900 | 815 | | 11.2% |
| 1910 | 902 | | 10.7% |
| 1920 | 921 | | 2.1% |
| 1930 | 906 | | −1.6% |
| 1940 | 945 | | 4.3% |
| 1950 | 1,102 | | 16.6% |
| 1960 | 1,116 | | 1.3% |
| 1970 | 1,179 | | 5.6% |
| 1980 | 1,205 | | 2.2% |
| 1990 | 1,216 | | 0.9% |
| 2000 | 1,269 | | 4.4% |
| 2010 | 1,145 | | −9.8% |
| 2020 | 972 | | −15.1% |
| 2023 (est.) | 944 | ▼ | −2.9% |
U.S. Decennial Census

=== 2010 census ===
As of the census of 2010, there were 1,145 people, 411 households, and 264 families living in the village. The population density was 835.8 inhabitants per square mile (322.7/km^{2}). There were 469 housing units at an average density of 342.3 per square mile (132.2/km^{2}). The racial makeup of the village was 95.5% White, 2.8% African American, 0.3% Native American, 0.1% Asian, and 1.4% from two or more races. Hispanic or Latino of any race were 1.7% of the population.

There were 411 households, of which 31.9% had children under the age of 18 living with them, 46.0% were married couples living together, 13.4% had a female householder with no husband present, 4.9% had a male householder with no wife present, and 35.8% were non-families. 30.7% of all households were made up of individuals, and 17% had someone living alone who was 65 years of age or older. The average household size was 2.44 and the average family size was 3.04.

The median age in the village was 44.2 years. 22.9% of residents were under the age of 18; 7.2% were between the ages of 18 and 24; 20.8% were from 25 to 44; 27.7% were from 45 to 64; and 21.4% were 65 years of age or older. The gender makeup of the village was 45.4% male and 54.6% female.

=== 2000 census ===
As of the census of 2000, there were 1,269 people, 427 households, and 271 families living in the village. The population density was 929.2 inhabitants per square mile (358.8/km^{2}). There were 463 housing units at an average density of 339.0 per square mile (130.9/km^{2}). The racial makeup of the village was 95.82% White, 3.07% African American, 0.32% from other races, and 0.79% from two or more races. Hispanic or Latino of any race were 1.18% of the population. 23.6% were of American, 14.9% German, 13.8% Irish, 9.4% English and 7.0% Italian ancestry according to Census 2000.

There were 427 households, out of which 34.4% had children under the age of 18 living with them, 51.1% were married couples living together, 9.4% had a female householder with no husband present, and 36.3% were non-families. 33.5% of all households were made up of individuals, and 21.1% had someone living alone who was 65 years of age or older. The average household size was 2.53 and the average family size was 3.27.

In the village, the population was spread out, with 25.0% under the age of 18, 5.6% from 18 to 24, 25.2% from 25 to 44, 22.5% from 45 to 64, and 21.7% who were 65 years of age or older. The median age was 40 years. For every 100 females there were 88.3 males. For every 100 females age 18 and over, there were 82.0 males.

The median income for a household in the village was $31,250, and the median income for a family was $45,526. Males had a median income of $31,845 versus $22,679 for females. The per capita income for the village was $14,702. About 8.2% of families and 10.7% of the population were below the poverty line, including 11.3% of those under age 18 and 20.7% of those age 65 or over.

== Parks and recreation ==
Pymatuning Lake and Pymatuning State Park are located east of Andover.

John R. Overly Recreation Park in Andover features a playground, hiking/biking paths, picnic area, pavilion, ball field and volleyball court.

== Education ==
The Pymatuning Valley Local School District operates elementary and high schools (Pymatuning Valley High School) in Andover. In 2006, the district completed major renovations as the high school, middle school, and elementary school are now all located on the same campus just west of town.

== Infrastructure ==
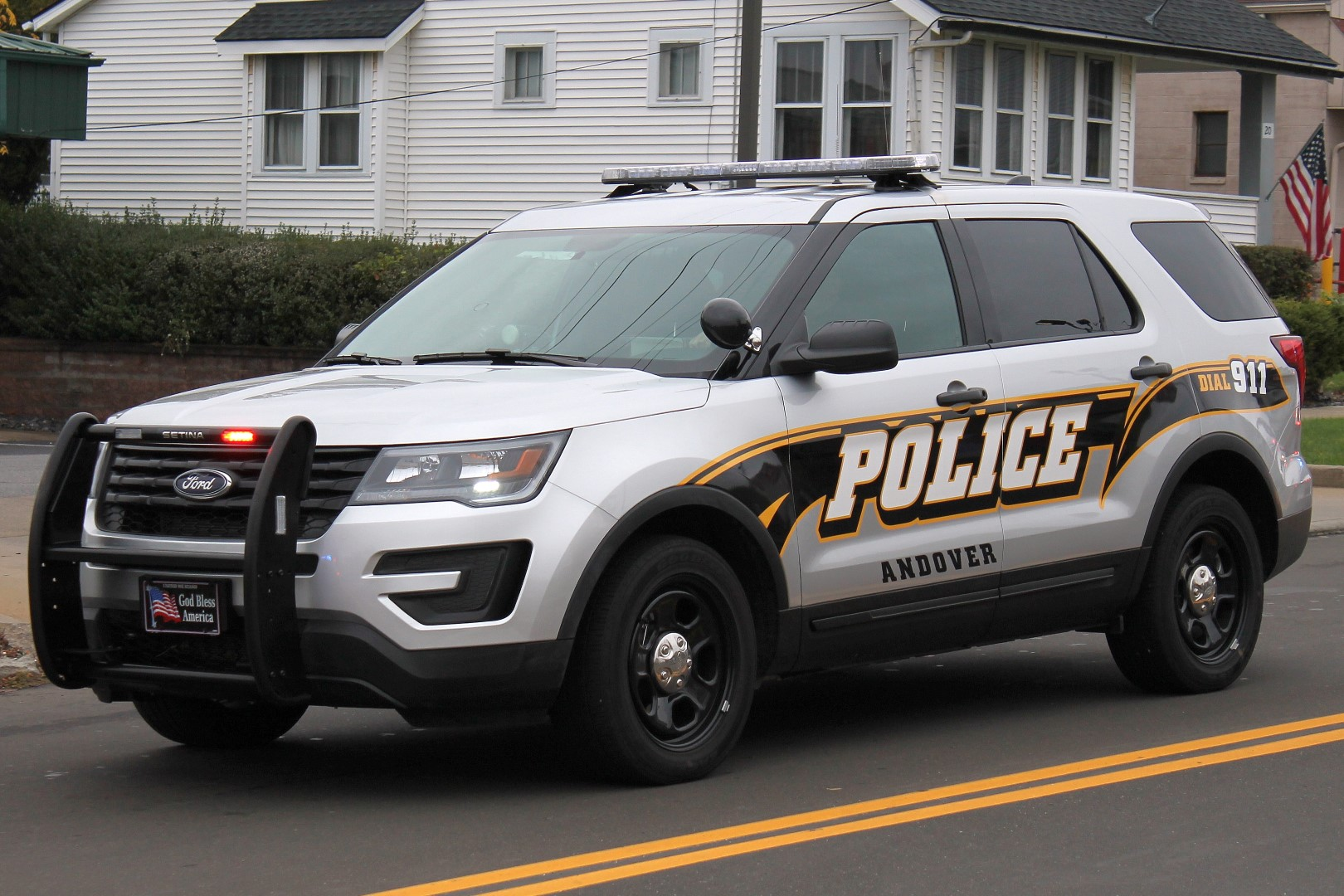
Andover police vehicle

- Greenville Hospital medical care facility
- Ambulance and fire service: Andover Volunteer Fire Department, Community Care Ambulance Network

== Notable people ==
- Maxwell Anderson - playwright, author, poet, journalist, and lyricist
- Celestia Rice Colby (1827–1900) - author, feminist
- Ellen Maria Colfax - wife of U.S. Vice President Schuyler Colfax
- Clarence Darrow - lawyer; established his first legal office in town in the early-1880s
