= West Geauga High School =

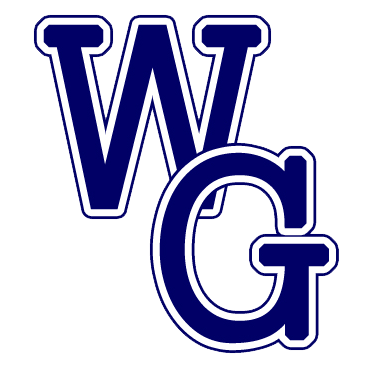

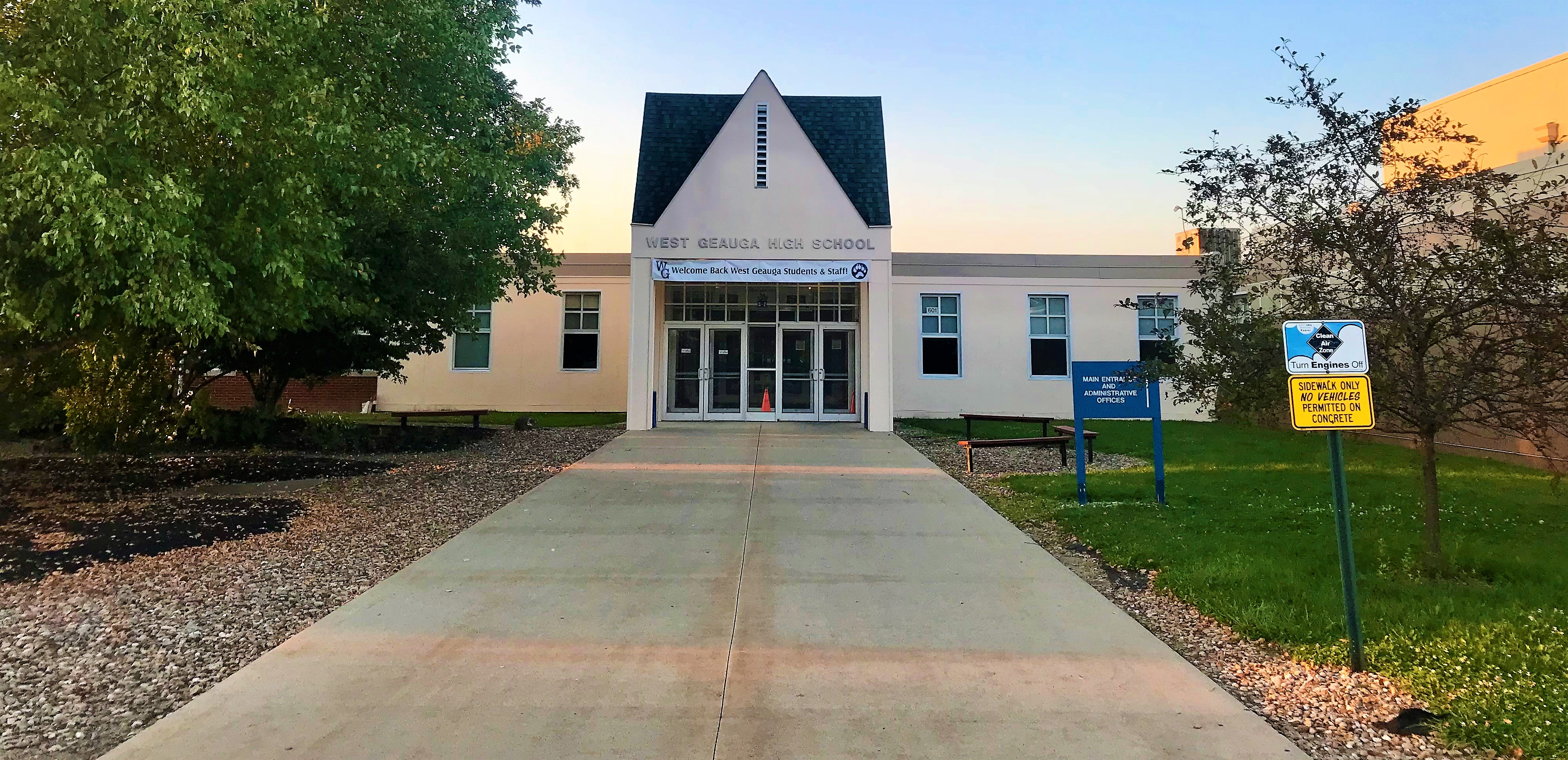

Location
- 13401 Chillicothe Road; Chesterland, Ohio; Chesterland, Ohio 44026; United States; 41°30′12″N 81°20′16″W

Information
- Type: Public
- Opened: 1950
- School district: West Geauga Local School District
- NCES School ID: 3904722028086
- Principal: Ryan Patti
- Teaching staff: 38.20 (FTE)
- Grades: 9–12
- Enrollment: 660 (2023–24)
- Average class size: 22
- Student to teacher ratio: 17.28
- Colors: Navy Blue and white
- Athletics conference: Chagrin Valley Conference
- Team name: Wolverines
- Website: www.westg.org/o/wghs

West Geauga High School is a public high school in Chesterland, Ohio. It is the only high school in the West Geauga Local School District. Their nickname is the Wolverines, and they compete in the Ohio High School Athletic Association as a member of the Chagrin Valley Conference.

== History ==
Opened in 1950, West Geauga High School serves students grades 9–12. The school was formed with the West Geauga Local School District in 1950 when Chester and Russell township schools consolidated, making it the first consolidated school in Geauga County.

In 2020, Newbury High School merged into WGHS as part of the merger between the Newbury Local School District and West Geauga Local School District. The merger had been approved in 2019 with a 3–2 vote.

== Awards and recognition ==
During the 2009–10 school year, West Geauga High School was recognized with the Excellent with Distinction rating on the State Report Card from the Ohio Department of Education for the 10th consecutive year.

The West Geauga High School Salamander Education and Environmental Discovery Project received the 2010 Take Pride in America Outstanding Youth Volunteer Group national award.

The WGHS Science Department was recognized as an Intel School of Distinction 2010 Finalist. They were selected as one of three finalists out of over 600 applicants nationwide. This recognition is awarded for the school's achievement in science, innovative practices, enriched learning opportunities for students, use of technology, etc. They received a $5,000 award.

== Clubs and activities ==
The school offers Latin Club, an Interact club, KEY club, student council, WESTG TV, Evirothon, Academic Challenge, Science Olympiad, National Honors Society, HUGS, Curio, Class Act, Whirlwind newspaper, yearbook, ultimate frisbee, Academic Decathlon, philosophy club, band, and choir.

== Athletics ==
West Geauga High School currently offers:

- Baseball
- Basketball
- Cheerleading
- Cross country
- Golf
- Gymnastics
- Football
- Hockey
- Lacrosse
- Tennis
- Track and field
- Soccer
- Softball
- Swimming and diving
- Volleyball

=== State championships ===
- Softball – 1991, 1994, 1995

== Notable alumni ==
- Brittni Mason – Paralympic sprinter
- Henry Bartlett - Dwarfism Activist
- Kellen Scharf - Nobel Prize Winning Academic Researcher
