= Orwell, Ohio =

- Village
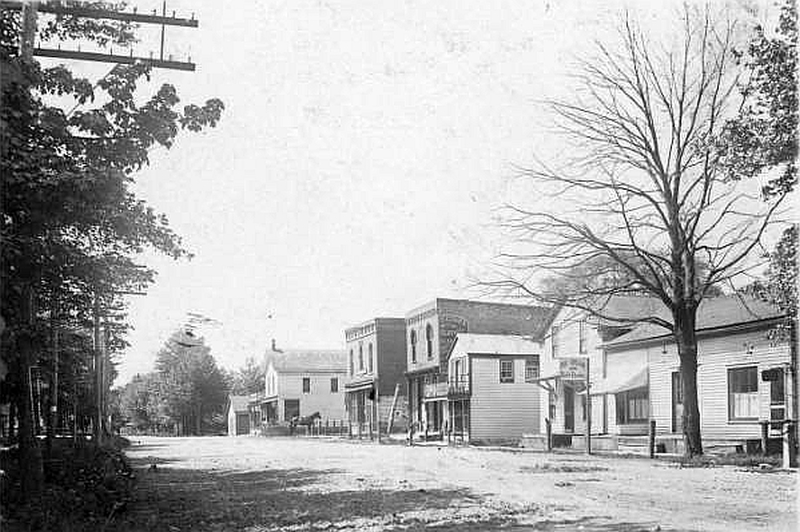
- Orwell, circa 1910

- Logo
- Motto: "Together We Achieve the Extraordinary"
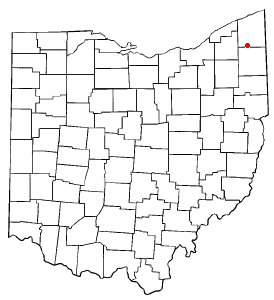
- Location of Orwell, Ohio

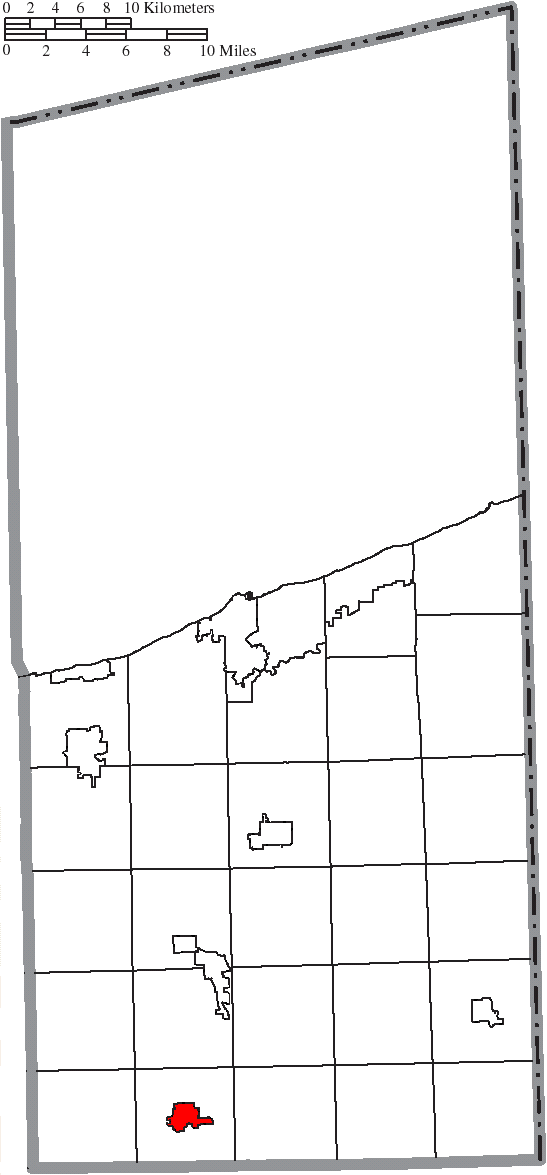
- Location of Orwell in Ashtabula County
- Coordinates: 41°31′54″N 80°51′24″W
- Country: United States
- State: Ohio
- County: Ashtabula
- Township: Orwell

Area
  - Total: 1.98 sq mi (5.12 km^{2})
  - Land: 1.98 sq mi (5.12 km^{2})
  - Water: 0 sq mi (0.00 km^{2})
- Elevation: 889 ft (271 m)

Population (2020)
  - Total: 1,533
  - Density: 775.5/sq mi (299.43/km^{2})
- Time zone: UTC-5 (Eastern (EST))
  - Summer (DST): UTC-4 (EDT)
- ZIP code: 44076
- Area code: 440
- FIPS code: 39-58856
- GNIS feature ID: 1065217
- Website: Village of Orwell, Ohio

Orwell is a village in Orwell Township, Ashtabula County, Ohio, United States. The population was 1,533 at the 2020 census.

== History ==
A post office called Orwell has been in operation since 1826. The name Orwell is derived from Orwell, Vermont, the native home of an early settler.

=== King Training Camp ===
Orwell is the location of the King Training Camp, owned by boxing promoter Don King. The facility, housed on State Route 45 South, often features famous boxers as well as up-and-coming fighters under King's promotional umbrella. In May 2006, the KTC hosted former undisputed welterweight champion Cory Spinks as he trained for his comeback fight against another Don King-backed fighter, IBF super welterweight champ Roman Karmazin.

== Geography ==
According to the United States Census Bureau, the village has a total area of 1.97 square miles (5.10 km^{2}), all land.

== Demographics ==
Historical population
Census	Pop.	Note	%±
1880	385		—
1930	599		—
1940	579		−3.3%
1950	759		31.1%
1960	819		7.9%
1970	965		17.8%
1980	1,067		10.6%
1990	1,258		17.9%
2000	1,519		20.7%
2010	1,660		9.3%
2020	1,533		−7.7%
U.S. Decennial Census

=== 2010 census ===
As of the census of 2010, there were 1,660 people, 642 households, and 411 families living in the village. The population density was 842.6 inhabitants per square mile (325.3/km^{2}). There were 706 housing units at an average density of 358.4 per square mile (138.4/km^{2}). The racial makeup of the village was 94.7% White, 1.3% African American, 0.4% Native American, 0.2% Asian, 0.2% from other races, and 3.1% from two or more races. Hispanic or Latino of any race were 0.7% of the population.

There were 642 households, of which 35.8% had children under the age of 18 living with them, 39.3% were married couples living together, 17.8% had a female householder with no husband present, 7.0% had a male householder with no wife present, and 36.0% were non-families. 29.4% of all households were made up of individuals, and 11.2% had someone living alone who was 65 years of age or older. The average household size was 2.52 and the average family size was 3.07.

The median age in the village was 35.4 years. 26.2% of residents were under the age of 18; 8.2% were between the ages of 18 and 24; 27.7% were from 25 to 44; 23.9% were from 45 to 64; and 13.9% were 65 years of age or older. The gender makeup of the village was 48.4% male and 51.6% female.

=== 2000 census ===
As of the census of 2000, there were 1,519 people, 618 households, and 378 families living in the village. The population density was 913.0 inhabitants per square mile (352.5/km^{2}). There were 660 housing units at an average density of 396.7 per square mile (153.2/km^{2}). The racial makeup of the village was 95.98% White, 1.25% African American, 0.13% Native American, 0.46% Asian, 0.46% from other races, and 1.71% from two or more races. Hispanic or Latino of any race were 1.12% of the population. 20.6% were of German, 12.8% Irish, 9.7% English, 8.7% Polish, 8.3% American, 7.1% Italian and 5.7% Hungarian ancestry according to Census 2000.

There were 618 households, out of which 33.3% had children under the age of 18 living with them, 44.5% were married couples living together, 12.3% had a female householder with no husband present, and 38.8% were non-families. 34.1% of all households were made up of individuals, and 13.4% had someone living alone who was 65 years of age or older. The average household size was 2.39 and the average family size was 3.10.

In the village, the population was spread out, with 26.7% under the age of 18, 11.0% from 18 to 24, 28.5% from 25 to 44, 20.1% from 45 to 64, and 13.7% who were 65 years of age or older. The median age was 33 years. For every 100 females there were 88.2 males. For every 100 females age 18 and over, there were 82.9 males.

The median income for a household in the village was $33,214, and the median income for a family was $41,705. Males had a median income of $31,851 versus $22,237 for females. The per capita income for the village was $16,160. About 7.2% of families and 10.9% of the population were below the poverty line, including 14.8% of those under age 18 and 13.7% of those age 65 or over.

== Education ==
Orwell Public Schools are part of the Grand Valley Local School District. Students attend Grand Valley Elementary School, Grand Valley Middle School and Grand Valley High School.

These schools serve the students of Hartsgrove, Orwell, Rome, Colebrook, Windsor, and sometimes Middlefield, townships in Ashtabula County, Ohio. Some students may also have North Bloomfield, Lenox, Rock Creek, or New Lyme zip codes or telephone exchanges.

== Notable people ==
- Russell Allen, Olympic cyclist
- Adna Chaffee, lieutenant general in the Civil War
- Don King, boxing promoter and longtime resident
