= Middlefield, Ohio =

- Village
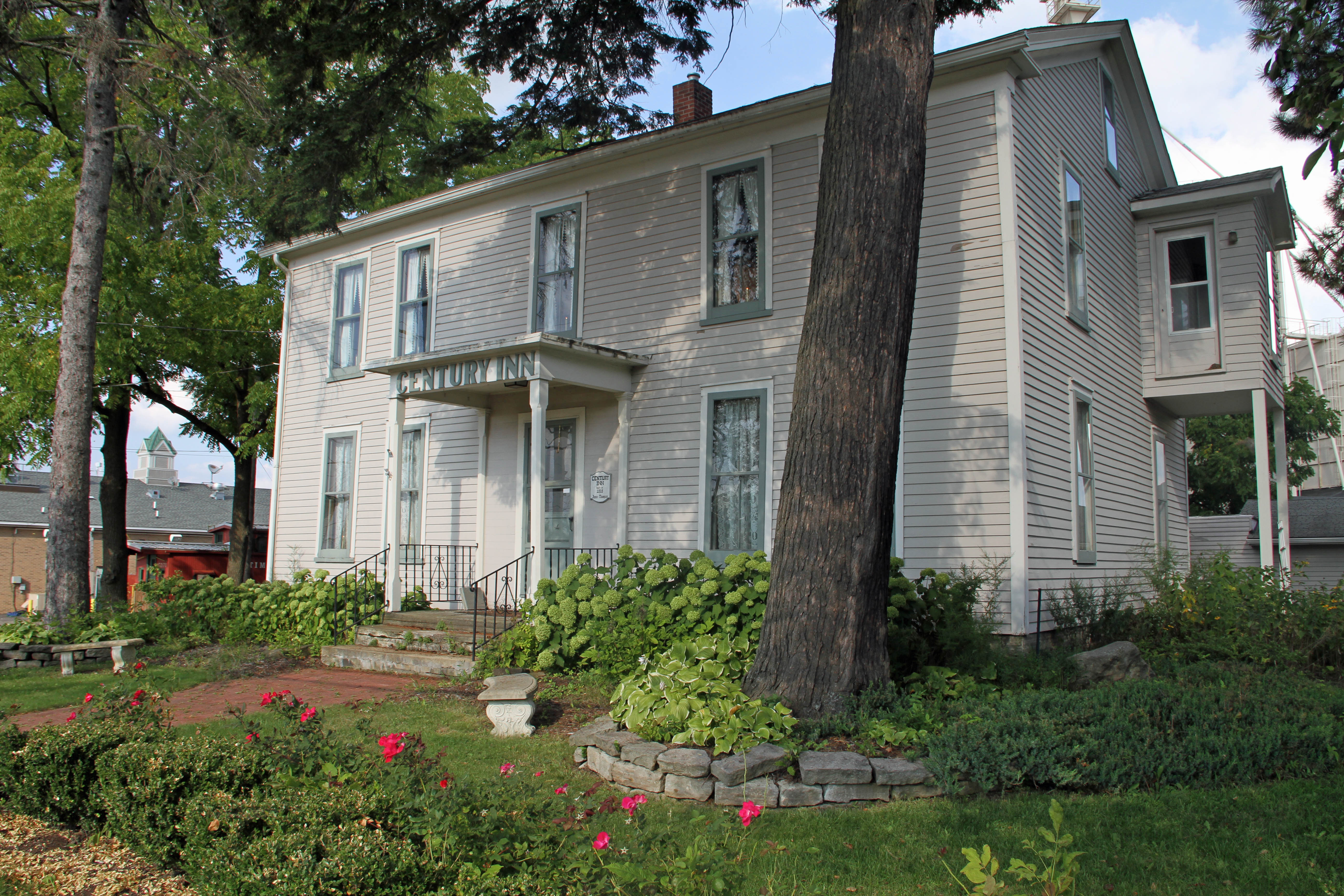
- Batavia House
- Motto(s): "Industry & Agriculture"
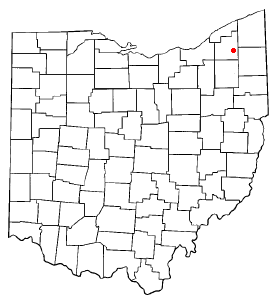
- Location of Middlefield, Ohio

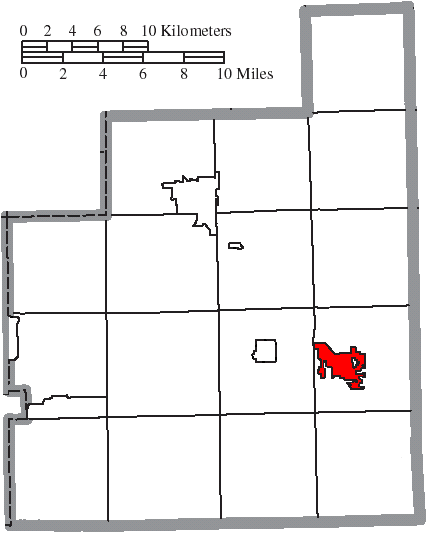
- Location of Middlefield in Geauga County
- Coordinates: 41°27′36″N 81°04′16″W
- Country: United States
- State: Ohio
- County: Geauga
- Founded: 1799

Area
  - Total: 3.40 sq mi (8.81 km^{2})
  - Land: 3.38 sq mi (8.75 km^{2})
  - Water: 0.023 sq mi (0.06 km^{2})
- Elevation: 1,129 ft (344 m)

Population (2020)
  - Total: 2,748
  - Density: 810/sq mi (314/km^{2})
- Time zone: UTC-5 (Eastern (EST))
  - Summer (DST): UTC-4 (EDT)
- ZIP code: 44062
- Area code: 440
- FIPS code: 39-49700
- GNIS feature ID: 2399332
- Website: middlefieldohio.com

Middlefield is a village in Geauga County, Ohio, United States. The population was 2,748 at the 2020 census. It is part of the Cleveland metropolitan area. Middlefield is known for being the center of the world's fourth largest Amish settlement, and its significant manufacturing base, which includes Gold Key Processing, Inc., Duncan Toys and KraftMaid. Because of its central location, home of the areas' public schools and prominent business and retail presence, Middlefield village is considered the hub community for Huntsburg, Parkman, and Middlefield Townships.

== History ==
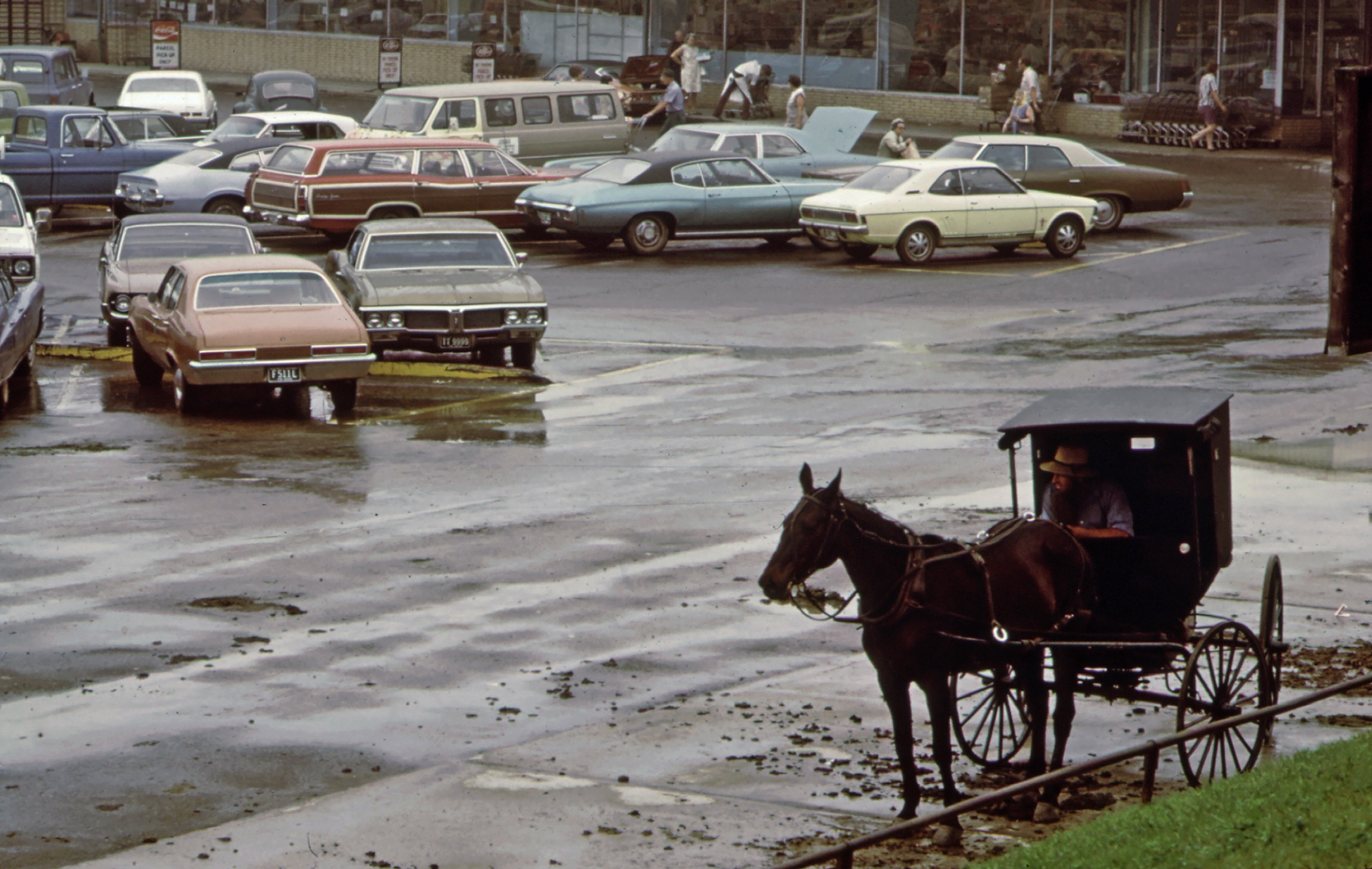
Amish horse and buggy in Middlefield, June 1973

Once named "Batavia," the village received its current name because it was the midway point between Painesville and Warren. Middlefield was established in 1799 by James Thompson and his father, Isaac Thompson, and incorporated in 1901.

Joseph Johnson settled north of Middlefield on what is now known as Johnson Corners in 1800. In 1818, James Thompson built a hotel. This hotel, later named The Century Inn, is currently the home of the Middlefield Historical Association. The Historical Association operates a small railroad museum in the summers, The Depot, focused on the 1873 narrow gauge railway between Painesville and Warren.

Middlefield's first manufacturing company was the Johnson Pail Company, founded in 1895.

The Middlefield Library, a branch of the Geauga County Public Library, was opened in 1942.

In 1965, the Ukrainian Scouting Organization, Plast, established its midwestern campground known as "Pysanyj Kamin" occupying over 150 acres at the easternmost end of Shedd Rd in Middlefield Township. Three-week summer camps draw hundreds of Ukrainian American campers from Chicago, Detroit, Cleveland, Philadelphia, Washington D.C., in addition to other North American cities and sometimes Ukraine.

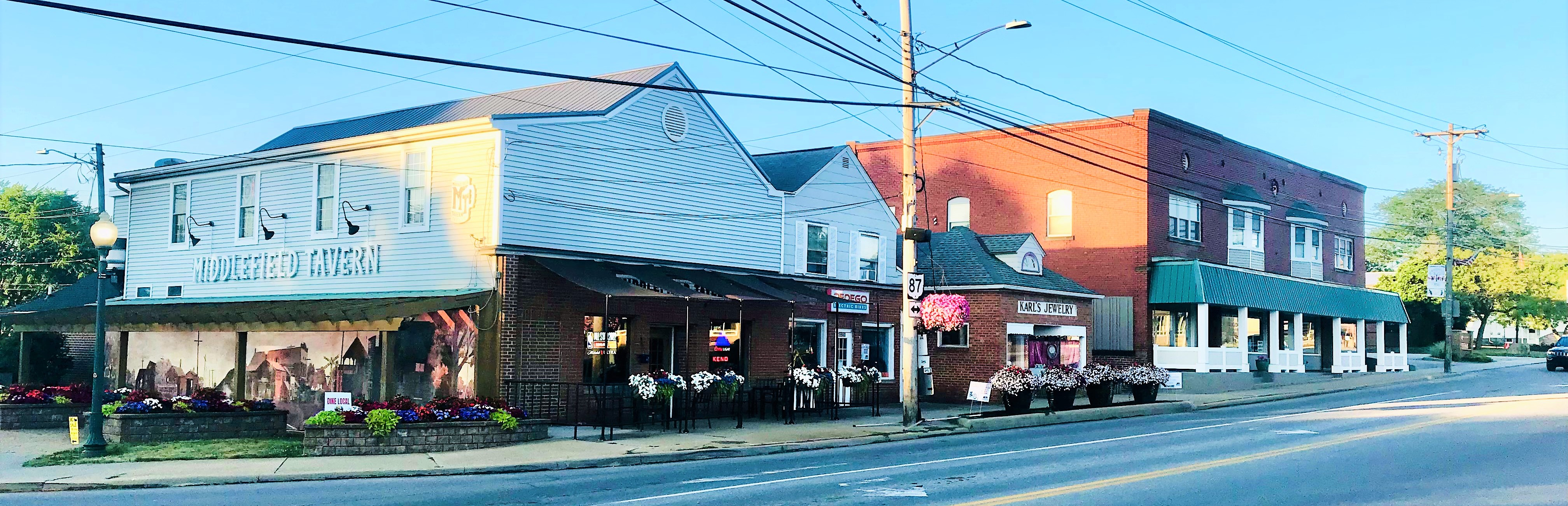
Middlefield Tavern and Karl's Jewelry in downtown

Middlefield realizes more than 80% of its income tax from industrial and commercial business, making this Geauga county's industrial capital.

In 2005, Wal-Mart opened a Supercenter in the village. In order to cater to the local Amish population, the Supercenter has an expanded parking lot that includes 37 hitching posts for Amish buggies, and the store is stocked with blocks of ice and fabrics for clothes to be made at home.

== Geography ==
According to the United States Census Bureau, the village has a total area of 3.04 square miles (7.87 km^{2}), of which 3.02 square miles (7.82 km^{2}) is land and 0.02 square miles (0.05 km^{2}) is water.

== Demographics ==
Historical population
Census	Pop.	Note	%±
1910	640		—
1920	706		10.3%
1930	726		2.8%
1940	932		28.4%
1950	1,141		22.4%
1960	1,467		28.6%
1970	1,726		17.7%
1980	1,997		15.7%
1990	1,898		−5.0%
2000	2,233		17.7%
2010	2,690		20.5%
2020	2,748		2.2%
U.S. Decennial Census

Middlefield is the center of the world's fourth largest Amish settlement, but very few actually live within the Village limits.

=== 2010 census ===
As of the census of 2010, there were 2,690 people, 1,186 households, and 678 families residing in the village. The population density was 892.1 inhabitants per square mile (344.4/km^{2}). There were 1,290 housing units at an average density of 427.2 per square mile (164.9/km^{2}). The racial makeup of the village was 96.9% White, 0.8% African American, 0.6% Asian, 0.1% from other races, and 1.6% from two or more races. Hispanic or Latino of any race were 0.8% of the population.

There were 1,186 households, of which 26.9% had children under the age of 18 living with them, 42.6% were married couples living together, 11.4% had a female householder with no husband present, 3.2% had a male householder with no wife present, and 42.8% were non-families. 37.9% of all households were made up of individuals, and 19.6% had someone living alone who was 65 years of age or older. The average household size was 2.20 and the average family size was 2.92.

The median age in the village was 43.8 years. 21.9% of residents were under the age of 18; 7.1% were between the ages of 18 and 24; 22.9% were from 25 to 44; 25.8% were from 45 to 64; and 22.5% were 65 years of age or older. The gender makeup of the village was 45.3% male and 54.7% female.

=== 2000 census ===
As of the census of 2000, there were 2,233 people, 955 households, and 576 families residing in the village. The population density was 743.1 inhabitants per square mile (286.9/km^{2}). There were 1,015 housing units at an average density of 337.8 per square mile (130.4/km^{2}). The racial makeup of the village was 97.90% White, 0.85% African American, 0.18% Native American, 0.36% Asian, 0.09% from other races, and 0.63% from two or more races. Hispanic or Latino of any race were 0.54% of the population.

There were 955 households, out of which 29.9% had children under the age of 18 living with them, 45.5% were married couples living together, 11.5% had a female householder with no husband present, and 39.6% were non-families. 33.9% of all households were made up of individuals, and 16.6% had someone living alone who was 65 years of age or older. The average household size was 2.25 and the average family size was 2.90.

In the village, the population was spread out, with 23.6% under the age of 18, 8.2% from 18 to 24, 30.5% from 25 to 44, 19.7% from 45 to 64, and 18.1% who were 65 years of age or older. The median age was 37 years. For every 100 females there were 85.6 males. For every 100 females age 18 and over, there were 80.6 males.

The median income for a household in the village was $38,581, and the median income for a family was $47,500. Males had a median income of $35,898 versus $26,302 for females. The per capita income for the village was $19,400. About 6.5% of families and 9.0% of the population were below the poverty line, including 7.5% of those under age 18 and 13.0% of those age 65 or over.

== Infrastructure ==
=== Transportation ===
The Geauga County Airport is located one nautical mile (1.2 mi; 1.9 km) southeast of Middlefield's central business district.

== Notable people ==
- Franklin L. Gilson, Wisconsin politician and judge
- Luther F. Gilson, Wisconsin politician and businessman
- Matthew Justice, professional wrestler
- David A. Lucht, fire safety advocate in government, academia, and the nonprofit sector
- Adele E. Thompson, writer
- Wardlow, professional wrestler
