= Bloomfield High School (Ohio) =

Coordinates: 41.464°N 80.871°W

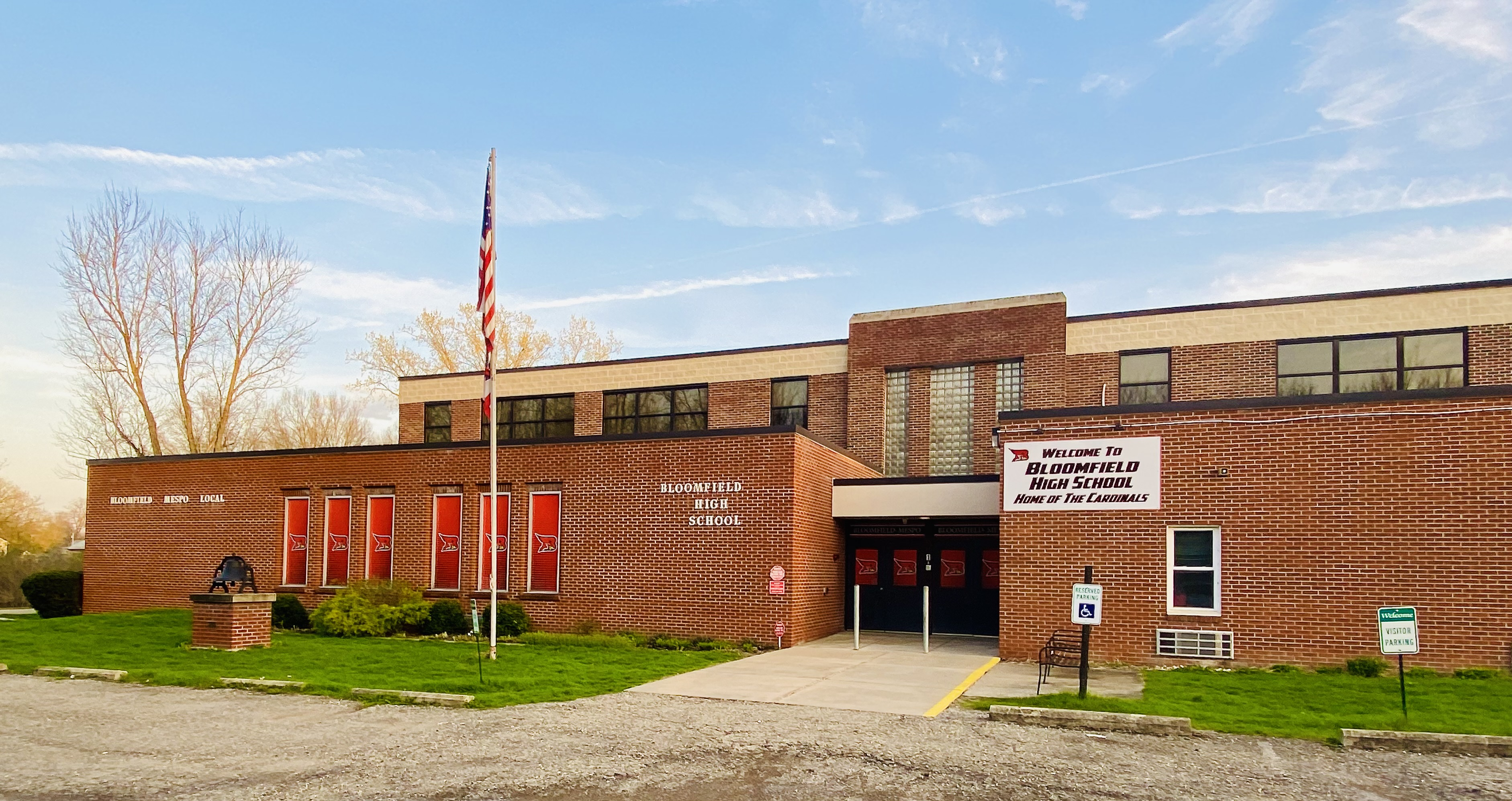

Location
- 2077 Park West Rd; North Bloomfield, Ohio 44450; United States

Information
- Type: Public secondary
- Opened: 1968
- School district: Bloomfield-Mespo School District
- NCES School ID: 390500903835
- Principal: Kevin Hogue
- Teaching staff: 14.00 (FTE)
- Grades: 9-12
- Gender: Coeducational
- Enrollment: 83 (2024-25)
- Student to teacher ratio: 5.93
- Colors: Red & black
- Athletics conference: Northeastern Athletic Conference
- Team name: Cardinals
- Website: www.bloomfieldmesposchools.org

Bloomfield High School is a public high school located in North Bloomfield, Ohio. It is the only high school in the Bloomfield-Mespo Schools District. Athletic teams are known as the Cardinals and compete as a member of the Ohio High School Athletic Association as member of the Northeastern Athletic Conference.

Bloomfield High School opened in 1968, following the consolidation of North Bloomfield and Mesopotamia township schools.

== Departments ==
There are several departments, including math, music, English, art, science, social studies, home economics, Spanish/communications, physical education, business/computers, guidance counselor and special education.

== Athletics ==
Bloomfield High School offers:

- Cross country
- Boys track and field
- Volleyball
