= North Bloomfield, Ohio =

- Unincorporated community
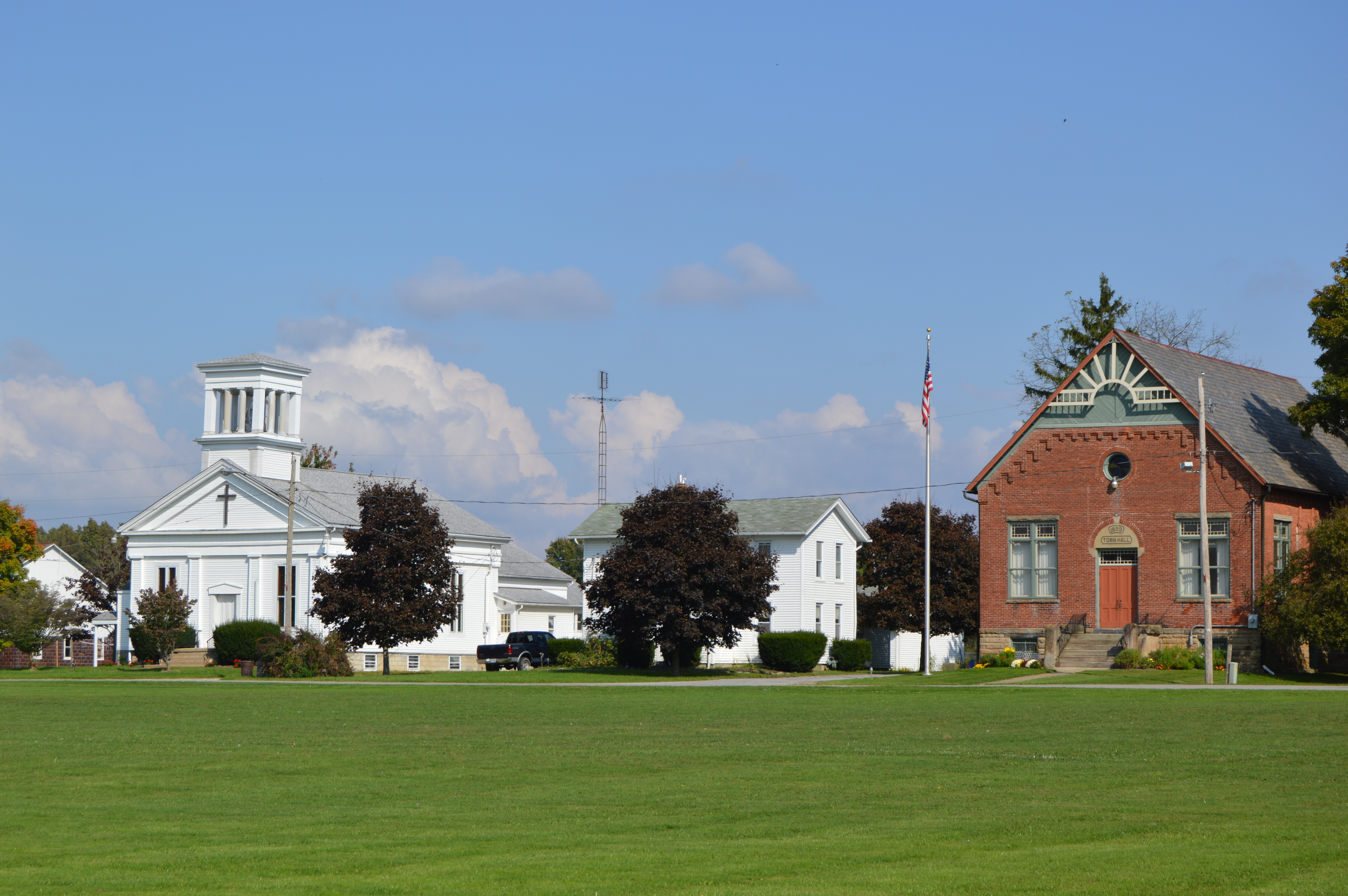
- Town green

- Location within Ohio
- Country: United States
- State: Ohio
- County: Trumbull
- Township: Bloomfield
- Elevation: 896 ft (273 m)
- Time zone: UTC-5 (Eastern (EST))
  - Summer (DST): UTC-4 (EDT)
- ZIP code: 44450
- Area codes: 234/330
- GNIS feature ID: 1065470

North Bloomfield is an unincorporated community in central Bloomfield Township, Trumbull County, Ohio, United States. It lies at the intersection of State Routes 45 and 87 and has a post office with the ZIP code 44450. It is part of the Youngstown–Warren metropolitan area.

== Education ==
Children in North Bloomfield are served by the Bloomfield-Mespo Local School District. The current schools serving the community are:

- Mesopotamia Elementary School – grades K-5
- Bloomfield Middle/High School – grades 6-12
