= News on the Green =

- Type: Monthly newspaper
- Founder(s): Judi Swogger and Joe Pinchot
- Publisher: PS Pinchot-Swogger Publishing, LLC.
- Founded: 2017
- Headquarters: Brookfield Township, Ohio
- Website: https://newsonthegreen.com

News on the Green is a monthly print newspaper and online news source published in Brookfield Township, Ohio that serves as the primary print news source for Brookfield, Yankee Lake, and Masury. The publication was founded in 2017 by Joe Pinchot and Judi Swogger and is published by PS Pinchot-Swogger Publishing, LLC.

== History ==
News on the Green was initially founded as a Facebook page by Joe Pinchot and Judi Swogger, two journalists who formerly worked at The Herald, based out of Sharon, Pennsylvania, in October 2017. A website was launched alongside the first printed publication in November 2017. The publication was founded in order to cover the news from the region. In 2018, Joe Pinchot was named to the Ohio School Boards Associations' media honor roll for provided fair and unbiased coverage about public schools in Ohio. In January 2019, the publication became a member of the Ohio News Media Association.
