= Yankee Lake =

Yankee Lake has the following meanings:

- The village of Yankee Lake, Ohio
- Yankee Lake (New York), a lake in Sullivan County, New York
