= Ohio State Route 609 =

State highway in Trumbull County, Ohio, US

State Route 609

Route information
- Maintained by ODOT
- Length: 2.65 mi (4.26 km)
- Existed: 1937–present

Major junctions
- West end: SR 7 near Orangeville
- East end: CR 182 at the Pennsylvania state line in Orangeville

Location
- Country: United States
- State: Ohio
- Counties: Trumbull

Highway system
- Ohio State Highway System; Interstate; US; State; Scenic
← SR 608	→ SR 611

State Route 609 (SR 609) is a 2.65-mile (4.26 km) long east–west state highway in the northeastern portion of the U.S. state of Ohio. The highway runs from its western terminus at a T-intersection SR 7 approximately 2 miles (3.2 km) west of the village of Orangeville to its eastern terminus at the Pennsylvania State line in Orangeville, where SR 609 meets a county-maintained road that straddles the border, Brockway–Sharon Road (County Road 182, or CR 182), at a T-intersection.

SR 609 was designated in the late 1930s. This two-lane state highway primarily serves to connect SR 7 with the village of Orangeville. It has done so throughout its history.

== Route description ==
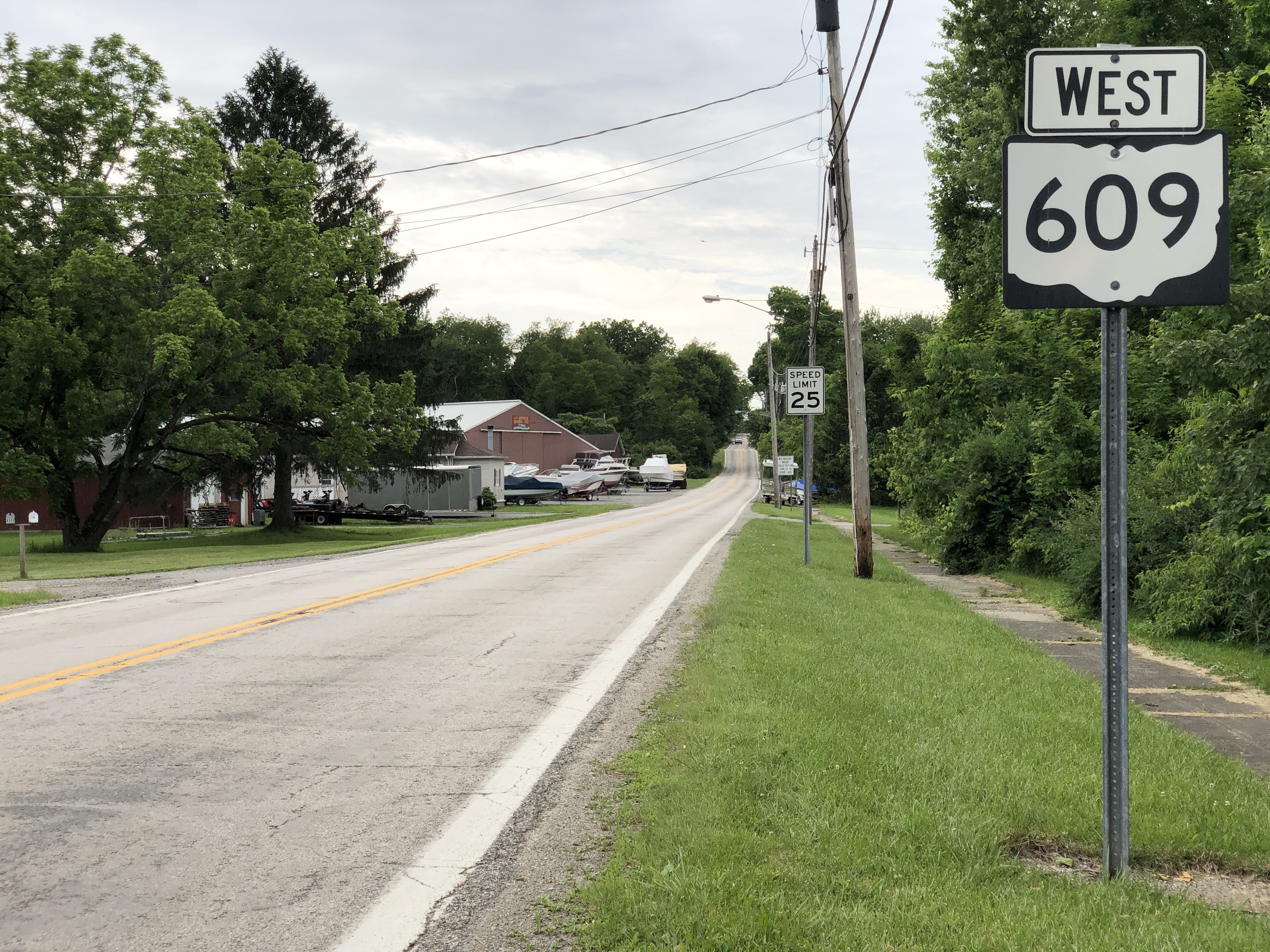
SR 609 in Orangeville

All of SR 609 is situated within the eastern part of Trumbull County. Beginning at a T-intersection with SR 7 in Hartford Township, SR 609 traverses easterly amidst homes and woods alike, with some farmland appearing along the way. The route intersects Custer–Orangeville Road (CR 169), then heads into Orangeville, where it becomes known as Hartford Street, and meets Hayes–Orangeville Road (CR 190). Through Orangeville, SR 609 passes by some homes, a few businesses, and finally Andy Dorick Park. Adjacent to the park, SR 609 comes to an end as it meets Brockway–Sharon Road (CR 182), which straddles the Pennsylvania state line, at a T-intersection located not too far from the northwest corner of Shenango River Lake.

This state route is not included as a part of the National Highway System (NHS).

== History ==
The SR 609 designation was applied in 1937. Throughout its entire history, SR 609 has utilized the same alignment between SR 7 and the Pennsylvania state line in the Orangeville area. When it was first established, the entirety of SR 609 was gravel-surfaced. By 1949, the full length of SR 609 was paved.

== Major intersections ==
The entire route is in Trumbull County.

Location	mi	km	Destinations	Notes
Hartford Township	0.00	0.00	SR 7 – Yankee Lake, Kinsman	
Orangeville	2.65	4.26	CR 182 (Brockway-Sharon Road)	Pennsylvania state line
1.000 mi = 1.609 km; 1.000 km = 0.621 mi
