= Brookfield Local School District =

Location
- 614 Bedford Rd SE; Brookfield, Trumbull County, Ohio 44403-9756; United States
- Coordinates: 41°13′34″N 80°33′41″W

Information
- Type: Public
- Opened: 1913
- Superintendent: Toby Gibson
- CEEB code: 360605
- NCES School ID: 3905012
- Teaching staff: 60.63 (FTE)
- Grades: K-12
- Enrollment: 964 (2024-2025)
- Student to teacher ratio: 15.90
- Campus type: Rural
- Colors: Blue & Gold
- Mascot: Warrior
- Website: Brookfield High School

The Brookfield Local School District is a school district located in Brookfield Township in Trumbull County, Ohio, United States. The school district serves one high school, one middle school and one elementary school within their K-12 campus located at 614 Bedford Rd Brookfield Township Trumbull County, Ohio 44403 United States.

== History ==
Brookfield closed all of its schools following the 2010–11 school year within its district and rebuilt its current school, which opened in 2011 and operated its K-12 district under a single school located at Bedford Rd. This was the result of a levee vote during the fall of 2007. The estimated cost of the new complex was $31.4 million.

== Schools ==
=== High School ===
- Brookfield High School

=== Middle School ===
- Brookfield Middle School

=== Elementary School ===
- Brookfield Elementary
