= Brookfield High School (Ohio) =

Location
- 614 Bedford Rd SE; Brookfield, Trumbull County, Ohio 44403-9756; United States
- Coordinates: 41°13′34″N 80°33′41″W

Information
- Type: Public
- Opened: 1912
- School district: Brookfield Local School District
- CEEB code: 360605
- NCES School ID: 390501203840
- Principal: Kristen Foster
- Teaching staff: 18.50 (FTE)
- Grades: 9–12
- Enrollment: 288 (2024–2025)
- Student to teacher ratio: 15.57
- Campus type: Rural
- Colors: Blue & gold
- Athletics conference: Mahoning Valley Athletic Conference
- Mascot: Warrior
- Website: Brookfield High School

Brookfield High School is a public high school located in Brookfield, Ohio. It is the only high school in the Brookfield Local School District. Athletic teams are known as the Warriors, and they compete in the Mahoning Valley Athletic Conference as a member of the Ohio High School Athletic Association.

== History ==
Brookfield High School opened in 1912. Prior to the high schools opening, students in Brookfield Township had to choose between attending Hartford Center Academy or Rayen High School in Youngstown.

Brookfield closed all of its schools following the 2010-11 school year within its district and rebuilt its current school, which opened in 2011 and operated its K-12 district under a single school located at Bedford Rd. This was the result of a levee vote during the fall of 2007. The estimated cost of the new complex was $31.4 million.

== Athletics ==
Brookfield High School currently offers:

- Baseball
- Basketball
- Bowling
- Cheerleading
- Cross country
- Football
- Golf
- Soccer
- Softball
- Track & field
- Volleyball
- Wrestling

=== State championships ===
- Football – 1978

== Notable alumni ==
- Marcus Marek - former professional football player in the National Football League (NFL)
- Bobby Jones - former professional football player in the National Football League (NFL)
