= Brookfield Center =

Brookfield Center may refer to:

- Brookfield Center, Connecticut, a census-designated place
  - Brookfield Center Historic District (Brookfield, Connecticut), within the CDP
- Brookfield Center, Ohio, a census-designated place
- Brookfield Place (New York City), a mixed-use complex in Battery Park City, New York City
