= WANR =

WANR may refer to:

- WANR (FM), a radio station (88.5 FM) licensed to serve Brewster, New York, United States
- WYWO, a radio station (1570 AM) licensed to serve Warren, Ohio, United States, which held the call sign WANR from 1990 to 2011
