= Mineral Ridge, Ohio =

- Census-designated place
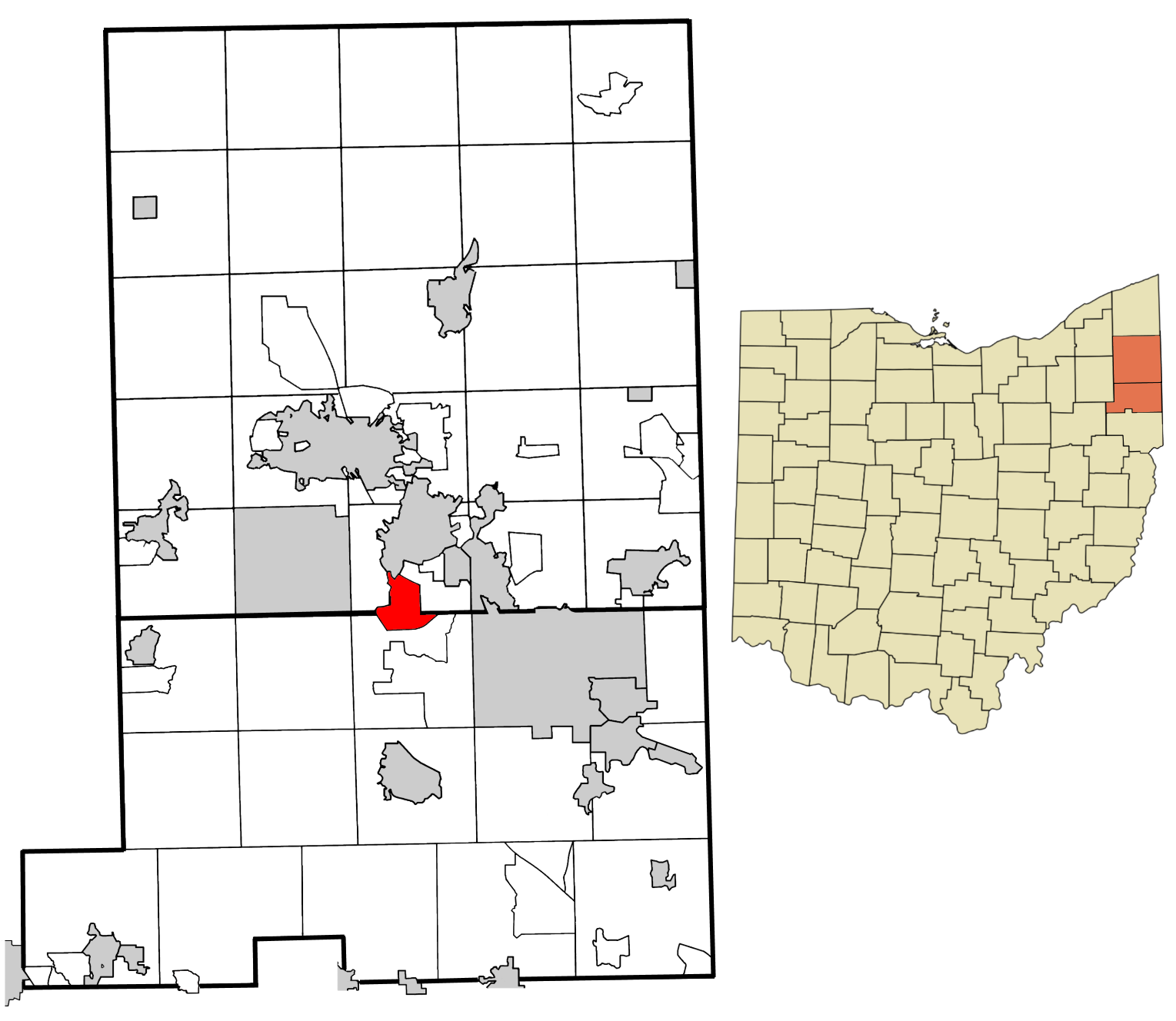
- Location in Trumbull and Mahoning counties, Ohio

- Location within Ohio Location within the United States
- Coordinates: 41°07′50″N 80°46′01″W
- Country: United States
- State: Ohio
- Counties: Trumbull, Mahoning
- Townships: Weathersfield, Austintown

Area
  - Total: 3.58 sq mi (9.28 km^{2})
  - Land: 3.56 sq mi (9.23 km^{2})
  - Water: 0.019 sq mi (0.05 km^{2})
- Elevation: 994 ft (303 m)

Population (2020)
  - Total: 3,951
  - Density: 1,108.8/sq mi (428.12/km^{2})
- Time zone: UTC-5 (Eastern (EST))
  - Summer (DST): UTC-4 (EDT)
- ZIP Codes: 44440 (Mineral Ridge); 44515 (Austintown)
- Area codes: 234/330
- FIPS code: 39-50778
- GNIS feature ID: 2393132

Mineral Ridge is an unincorporated community and census-designated place in southern Trumbull and northern Mahoning counties in the U.S. state of Ohio. The population was 3,951 at the 2020 census. It is a suburb in the Youngstown–Warren metropolitan area. Mineral Ridge was named for valuable coal deposits near the original town site.

== History ==
The area of Mineral Ridge was primarily a farming community, with some coal mining in the 1830s. In the mid-1850s, John Lewis, superintendent of the Mineral Ridge Coal Mines, discovered black band iron ore beneath the layers of coal ore, leading to a boom of companies working with the blast furnaces of Brier Hill, Niles, and later, Mineral Ridge itself. The main deposit of iron for Youngstown’s growing steel industry, this iron was known as “American Scotch Pig” and “Warner’s Scotch Pig.”

By the late 19th century, the mining industry was largely in decline and Mineral Ridge disincorporated in 1917. However, some mines did still operate into the Great Depression.

== Geography ==
According to the United States Census Bureau, the CDP has a total area of 3.28 square miles (8.49 km^{2}), of which 3.26 square miles (8.45 km^{2}) is land and 0.015 square miles (0.04 km^{2}), or 0.51%, is water.

== Demographics ==
Historical population
Census	Pop.	Note	%±
2000	3,900		—
2010	3,892		−0.2%
2020	3,951		1.5%
U.S. Decennial Census

=== 2020 census ===
As of the 2020 census, Mineral Ridge had a population of 3,951. The median age was 45.9 years. 20.0% of residents were under the age of 18 and 24.0% of residents were 65 years of age or older. For every 100 females there were 93.5 males, and for every 100 females age 18 and over there were 93.0 males age 18 and over.

94.6% of residents lived in urban areas, while 5.4% lived in rural areas.

There were 1,562 households in Mineral Ridge, of which 23.4% had children under the age of 18 living in them. Of all households, 49.6% were married-couple households, 18.1% were households with a male householder and no spouse or partner present, and 25.5% were households with a female householder and no spouse or partner present. About 29.4% of all households were made up of individuals and 13.9% had someone living alone who was 65 years of age or older.

There were 1,674 housing units, of which 6.7% were vacant. The homeowner vacancy rate was 2.8% and the rental vacancy rate was 9.5%.

Racial composition as of the 2020 census
Race	Number	Percent
White	3,605	91.2%
Black or African American	110	2.8%
American Indian and Alaska Native	9	0.2%
Asian	6	0.2%
Native Hawaiian and Other Pacific Islander	1	0.0%
Some other race	23	0.6%
Two or more races	197	5.0%
Hispanic or Latino (of any race)	129	3.3%

=== 2000 census ===
As of the census of 2000, there were 3,900 people, 1,377 households, and 995 families living in the CDP. The population density was 1,183.5 inhabitants per square mile (457.0/km^{2}). There were 1,439 housing units at an average density of 436.7 per square mile (168.6/km^{2}). The racial makeup of the CDP was 96.31% White, 2.08% African American, 0.10% Native American, 0.10% Asian, 0.03% Pacific Islander, 0.62% from other races, and 0.77% from two or more races. Hispanic or Latino of any race were 1.51% of the population.

There were 1,377 households, out of which 36.0% had children under the age of 18 living with them, 56.8% were married couples living together, 12.5% had a female householder with no husband present, and 27.7% were non-families. 24.1% of all households were made up of individuals, and 7.0% had someone living alone who was 65 years of age or older. The average household size was 2.61 and the average family size was 3.12.

In the CDP the population was spread out, with 24.5% under the age of 18, 7.9% from 18 to 24, 28.4% from 25 to 44, 25.0% from 45 to 64, and 14.2% who were 65 years of age or older. The median age was 38 years. For every 100 females there were 92.7 males. For every 100 females age 18 and over, there were 88.0 males.

The median income for a household in the CDP was $45,689, and the median income for a family was $51,538. Males had a median income of $41,556 versus $25,833 for females. The per capita income for the CDP was $19,111. About 6.7% of families and 9.2% of the population were below the poverty line, including 14.2% of those under age 18 and 3.5% of those age 65 or over.
