= Lordstown High School =

Coordinates: 41°10′05″N 80°51′40″W

Location
- 1824 Salt Springs Road; Warren, Ohio 44481; United States

Information
- Type: Public
- Established: 1917
- School district: Lordstown Local School District
- NCES School ID: 390502003875
- Principal: James Vivo
- Teaching staff: 17.58 (FTE)
- Grades: 7–12
- Enrollment: 173 (2024–25)
- Student to teacher ratio: 9.84
- Colors: Red and blue
- Athletics conference: Northeastern Athletic Conference
- Team name: Red Devils
- Website: www.lordstown.k12.oh.us/departments/lordstown-high-school

Lordstown High School is a public high school in Lordstown, Ohio, United States. It is the only high school in the Lordstown Local School District. Athletic teams are known as the Red Devils, and they compete in the Ohio High School Athletic Association as a member of the Northeastern Athletic Conference.

== History ==
Lordstown High School opened in 1917, following the consolidation of several one-room schoolhouses in Lordstown. A brick building was erected to house the district's students and served as the primary building for much of the 20th century.

In 1977, Lordstown moved to its current campus located on Salt Springs Road. The district celebrated its 100th graduating class in 2018.

== Athletics ==
Lordstown High School offers:

- Baseball
- Basketball
- Bowling
- Cross country
- Cheerleading
- Golf
- Soccer
- Softball
- Tennis
- Track and field
- Volleyball
