= Mark Dailey =

Canadian television journalist and announcer

- Dailey in a Citytv publicity photograph
- Born: Mark Edward Dailey; August 1, 1953; Youngstown, Ohio, U.S.
- Died: December 6, 2010 (aged 57); Toronto, Ontario, Canada
- Education: Law enforcement
- Occupations: Reporter; Ohio state trooper Part-time truck driver
- Years active: 1974–2010
- Employer(s): Channel Seventy-Nine Ltd. (1979-1981); CHUM Limited (1979-2007); Rogers Media (2007-2010)
- Spouse(s): Kim (née Murray and Gould) Dailey
- Children: Nicole Grove (daughter)
- Relatives: Kathleen and Colleen (sisters); John and Rose-Marie Dailey (parents)

Mark Edward Dailey (August 1, 1953 – December 6, 2010) was an American-born Canadian television journalist and announcer. He was the host of 11 p.m. weeknight CityNews newscasts in Toronto, Ontario, and a prominent continuity announcer voicing interstitial program announcements on CITY-TV.

== Career ==
Dailey was born and raised in Youngstown, Ohio, to parents John and Rose-Marie (Genetta) Dailey and was one of three children (sisters Kathleen and Colleen).

Dailey graduated from Ursuline High School and then studied law enforcement at Youngstown State University, in Ohio, worked as a state trooper in the Ohio State Highway Patrol, and became a crime reporter for stations in Ohio (first at WNIO/1540 AM - now known as WYOH - and then ABC affiliate WYTV in the late 1960s) and at radio station CKLW in Windsor, Ontario, before moving to Toronto in 1974. According to musician and Dailey's former co-worker Kurt Swinghammer, Dailey also briefly worked as a security guard for R&B and soul music legend Marvin Gaye in Detroit.

Prior to Citytv, Dailey worked at Q-107 and CHUM-AM and FM, joining CHUM in 1974 and moving to Citytv five years later. He joined the station in 1979 as an assignment editor and producer, later becoming its crime specialist and then a news anchor, and worked there for 31 years. He was well-known for voicing the station's slogan: "This is Citytv, Everywhere!".

Dailey was among the first television journalists in Canada to specialise in crime reporting. He was the first reporter to reach the scene in 1980 when Metropolitan Toronto Police constable Michael Sweet was fatally wounded during an attempted robbery, and he also covered a fatal propane explosion in Buffalo in 1983.

== Acting ==
As a voice actor, Dailey voiced characters in the animated series Medabots, The Ripping Friends, Beyblade where he voiced the fictional commentator Brad Best, Grossology, My Dad the Rock Star, Spliced, and others like Rescue Heroes and Storm Hawks. He also appeared (as a news reporter) in several Canadian films including Nicholas Campbell's Boozecan (1994), Claire's Hat, The Life Before This, and Childstar. He did voiceover work for one season of the Fishn' Canada Show (1999), and Magavision (1999) outdoor video newsletter.

Dailey is widely credited with delivering the title line during the chorus of the 1982 Rush song "Subdivisions", although he denied this. Neil Peart, who was the drummer of Rush, was actually the person who voiced "Subdivisions" in the chorus of the song.

== Awards and recognition ==
Dailey received a national RTNDA award for the CityNews series I Want Work, a Governor General's Letter of Appreciation, the Toronto Civic Award of Merit, and Consumers Choice Man of the Year in 2009. He was also recognised by the Metropolitan Toronto Police and Toronto Fire Services for his coverage of their work.

== Death ==
Dailey survived prostate cancer but announced during his 11 p.m. newscast on September 9, 2010, that he had been diagnosed with kidney cancer. The cancer spread to his lungs and he died on December 6, 2010, at Sunnybrook Health Sciences Centre. He was 57 years old.
