= Trumbull County, Ohio =

County in Ohio, United States

- County
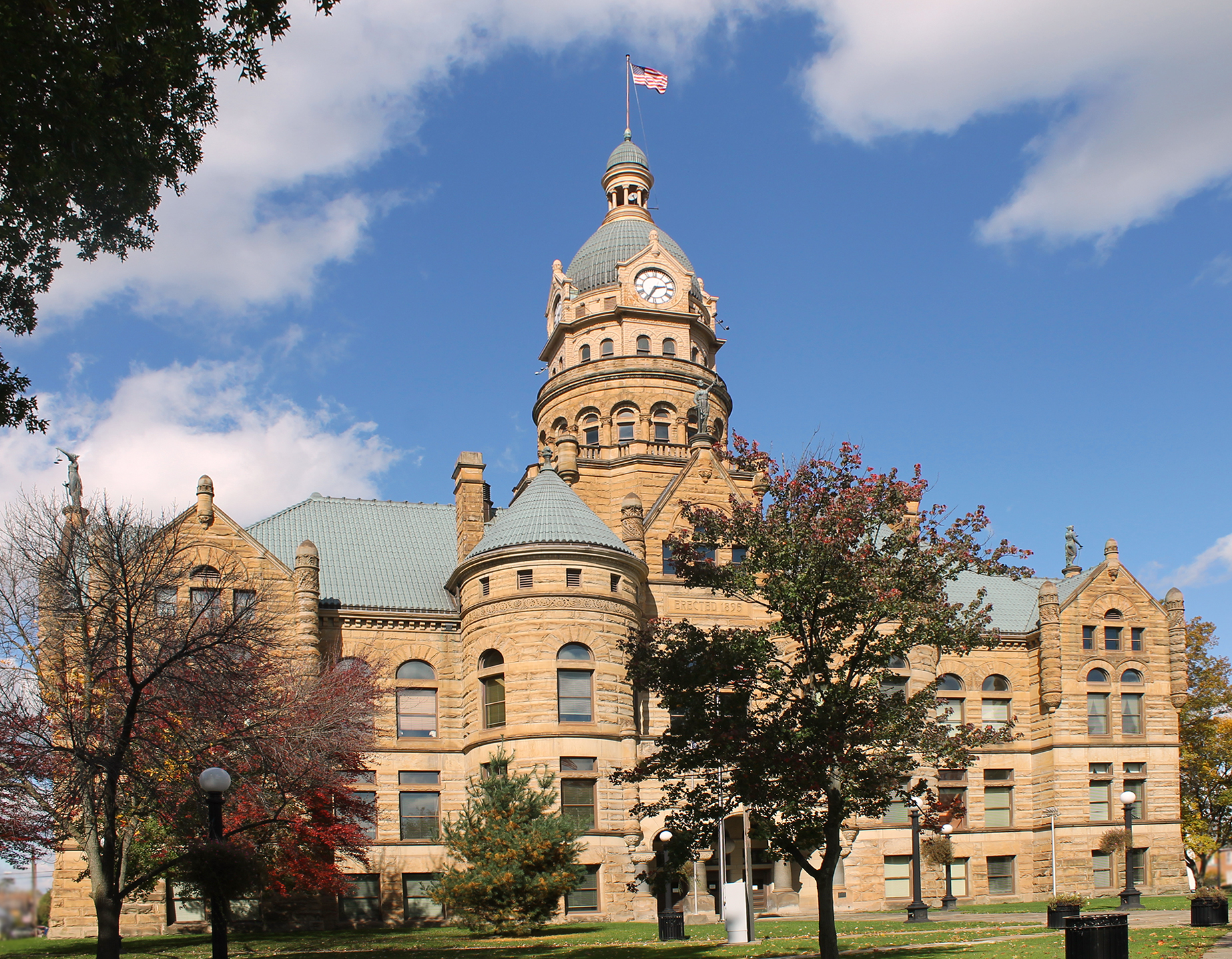
- Trumbull County Courthouse

- Flag Seal

- Location within the U.S. state of Ohio
- Coordinates: 41°19′N 80°46′W
- Country: United States
- State: Ohio
- Founded: July 10, 1800
- Named for: Jonathan Trumbull
- Seat: Warren
- Largest city: Warren

Area
  - Total: 637 sq mi (1,650 km^{2})
  - Land: 618 sq mi (1,600 km^{2})
  - Water: 18 sq mi (47 km^{2}) 2.9%

Population (2020)
  - Total: 201,977
  - Estimate (2025): 198,972 ▼
  - Density: 324/sq mi (125/km^{2})
- Time zone: UTC−5 (Eastern)
  - Summer (DST): UTC−4 (EDT)
- Congressional district: 14th
- Website: www.co.trumbull.oh.us

Trumbull County is located in the far northeast portion of the U.S. state of Ohio. As of the 2020 census, the population was 201,977. Its county seat and largest city is Warren, which developed industry along the Mahoning River. Trumbull County is part of the Youngstown–Warren, OH Metropolitan Statistical Area.

== History ==
No Native American settlements have ever formally been identified in Trumbull County. Early settlers did believe they noted an ancient village site in Kinsman Township, a more contemporary site in Hartford Township, and several strange stone constructions were noted in the Black Ash Swamp by early Bristol residents, now known as the Grand River Preserve. Many presumably different groups of Native Americans were still frequenting camps in the vicinity of Newton Falls and near the Champion Township–Warren Township border when U.S. settlers first began to settle there. Several of the names of specific Native persons are echoed across most of these early residents' histories, namely Cadashaway, Paqua and Kiogg. A memorial stone piles believed to have been Native in origin was situated on the west bank of the Mahoning River, but was later removed for construction purposes.

Before 1600, the area was ambiguously between the territories of the Erie people to the east and the Whittlesey culture to the west. It is unknown precisely where one tribe's territory ended and the other began. After the Beaver Wars, the area was frequented by traveling Lenape, Wyandot, Ottawa, Shawnee and Seneca, who all had settlements nearby for a time and shared the valley's animal, food and medicinal resources. They also regularly panned for salt in the marshes. The Natives collectively used this area as a shared hunting ground, but had to give up ownership of the region for settlement as punishment for participating in the Northwest Indian War.

In the early years of the European discovery and exploration of the New World, the land that became Trumbull County was originally claimed by French explorers as part of colonial New France. Their settlements had some fur traders who interacted with Native American tribes in this area. After losing the Seven Years' War to Great Britain, France ceded the territory in 1763, which became the Province of Quebec.

Following the United States' victory in the American Revolutionary War, the British ceded the land including modern Trumbull County. It was part of the Connecticut Western Reserve, a region claimed by the Connecticut Colony and later state of Connecticut. As first organized, Trumbull County consisted of the entire area of the Connecticut Western Reserve before population increased, and it was divided into smaller counties. The county's largest city, Warren, was originally founded as the capitol of the Western Reserve territory. Connecticut relinquished its claim to some of the lands in 1786, but retained ownership of the eastern portion south of Lake Erie. It sold much of the Western Reserve in 1795 to a group of speculators who operated as the Connecticut Land Company; they sold it in portions for development by new settlers.

Early residents reported that Native Americans still frequented the area until roughly 1811. Some of the final Native residents were camped along the Grand River in Mespotamia Township during the war, leading to an upsetting altercation in which the locals found and ransacked their camp and, as a warning to leave, carved an image of a Native man into a tree and shot it. The Natives responded by carving a white man into a tree without a mark on it, but seem to have later felt it was unsafe to stay and left. Only a handful of Native individuals were left throughout all of Northeast Ohio and historically recorded following this.

The county is named for Jonathan Trumbull, the governor of Connecticut during the American Revolution, who once owned the land in this region. Early settlements were made along the Mahoning River and other waterways, which provided transportation access and water power to the industries that developed later in the 19th century.

== Geography ==
According to the United States Census Bureau, the county has a total area of 637 square miles (1,650 km^{2}), of which 618 square miles (1,600 km^{2}) is land and 18 square miles (47 km^{2}) (2.9%) is water. It is approximately a square with sides of 25.24 miles; it is the only square county in Ohio.

=== Adjacent counties ===
- Ashtabula County (north)
- Crawford County, Pennsylvania (northeast)
- Mercer County, Pennsylvania (east)
- Mahoning County (south)
- Portage County (southwest)
- Geauga County (northwest)

=== Major highways ===
- US 62
- US 422
- I-80
- SR 5
- SR 7
- SR 11
- SR 45
- SR 46
- SR 82
- SR 87
- SR 88
- SR 169
- SR 193
- SR 303
- SR 304
- SR 305
- SR 534
- SR 609
- SR 616
- SR 711

== Demographics ==
Historical population
Census	Pop.	Note	%±
1800	1,302		—
1810	8,671		566.0%
1820	15,546		79.3%
1830	26,153		68.2%
1840	38,107		45.7%
1850	30,490		−20.0%
1860	30,656		0.5%
1870	38,659		26.1%
1880	44,880		16.1%
1890	42,373		−5.6%
1900	46,591		10.0%
1910	52,766		13.3%
1920	83,920		59.0%
1930	123,063		46.6%
1940	132,315		7.5%
1950	158,915		20.1%
1960	208,526		31.2%
1970	232,579		11.5%
1980	241,863		4.0%
1990	227,813		−5.8%
2000	225,116		−1.2%
2010	210,312		−6.6%
2020	201,977		−4.0%
2025 (est.)	198,972	▼	−1.5%
U.S. Decennial Census; 1790–1960 1900–1990; 1990–2000 2010–2020 2024

=== 2020 census ===
Trumbull County, Ohio – Racial and ethnic composition Note: the US Census treats Hispanic/Latino as an ethnic category. This table excludes Latinos from the racial categories and assigns them to a separate category. Hispanics/Latinos may be of any race.
Race / ethnicity (NH = Non-Hispanic)	Pop. 1980	Pop. 1990	Pop. 2000	Pop. 2010	Pop. 2020	% 1980	% 1990	% 2000	% 2010	% 2020
White alone (NH)	224,592	209,819	201,953	185,388	169,627	92.86%	92.10%	89.71%	88.15%	83.98%
Black or African American alone (NH)	14,517	15,136	17,628	17,200	16,940	6.00%	6.64%	7.83%	8.18%	8.39%
Native American or Alaska Native alone (NH)	201	328	305	326	249	0.08%	0.14%	0.14%	0.16%	0.12%
Asian alone (NH)	806	960	987	979	1,099	0.33%	0.42%	0.44%	0.47%	0.54%
Native Hawaiian or Pacific Islander alone (NH)	x (Note: Included in the Asian category in the 1980 Census.)	x (Note: Included in the Asian category in the 1990 Census.)	31	36	26	x	x	0.01%	0.02%	0.01%
Other race alone (NH)	373	116	179	216	609	0.15%	0.05%	0.08%	0.10%	0.30%
Mixed race or Multiracial (NH)	x (Note: Not an option in the 1980 Census.)	x (Note: Not an option in the 1990 Census.)	2,239	3,366	9,248	x	x	0.99%	1.60%	4.58%
Hispanic or Latino (any race)	1,374	1,454	1,794	2,801	4,179	0.57%	0.64%	0.80%	1.33%	2.07%
Total	241,863	227,813	225,116	210,312	201,977	100.00%	100.00%	100.00%	100.00%	100.00%

As of the 2020 census, the county had a population of 201,977. The median age was 44.9 years. 19.9% of residents were under the age of 18 and 22.3% of residents were 65 years of age or older. For every 100 females there were 96.3 males, and for every 100 females age 18 and over there were 94.3 males.

The racial makeup of the county was 84.7% White, 8.5% Black or African American, 0.1% American Indian and Alaska Native, 0.5% Asian, <0.1% Native Hawaiian and Pacific Islander, 0.7% from some other race, and 5.4% from two or more races. Hispanic or Latino residents of any race comprised 2.1% of the population.

72.8% of residents lived in urban areas, while 27.2% lived in rural areas.

There were 86,071 households in the county, of which 24.7% had children under the age of 18 living in them. Of all households, 42.4% were married-couple households, 20.3% were households with a male householder and no spouse or partner present, and 29.8% were households with a female householder and no spouse or partner present. About 32.6% of all households were made up of individuals and 15.3% had someone living alone who was 65 years of age or older.

There were 94,394 housing units, of which 8.8% were vacant. Among occupied housing units, 70.1% were owner-occupied and 29.9% were renter-occupied. The homeowner vacancy rate was 1.8% and the rental vacancy rate was 9.5%.

=== 2010 census ===
As of the census of 2010, there were 210,312 people, 86,011 households, and 56,874 families living in the county. The population density was 340.1 inhabitants per square mile (131.3/km^{2}). There were 96,163 housing units at an average density of 155.5 units per square mile (60.0 units/km^{2}). The racial makeup of the county was 89.0% white, 8.3% black or African American, 0.5% Asian, 0.2% American Indian, 0.3% from other races, and 1.8% from two or more races. Those of Hispanic or Latino origin made up 1.3% of the population. In terms of ancestry, 21.6% were German, 16.5% were American, 14.3% were Irish, 13.7% were Italian, and 10.6% were English.

Of the 86,011 households, 28.8% had children under the age of 18 living with them, 47.4% were married couples living together, 13.7% had a female householder with no husband present, 33.9% were non-families, and 29.2% of all households were made up of individuals. The average household size was 2.40 and the average family size was 2.95. The median age was 42.8 years.

The median income for a household in the county was $42,296 and the median income for a family was $52,731. Males had a median income of $43,382 versus $30,859 for females. The per capita income for the county was $21,854. About 11.5% of families and 15.4% of the population were below the poverty line, including 24.9% of those under age 18 and 8.1% of those age 65 or over.

=== 2000 census ===
As of the census of 2000, there were 225,116 people, 89,020 households, and 61,690 families living in the county. The population density was 365 inhabitants per square mile (141/km^{2}). There were 95,117 housing units at an average density of 154 units per square mile (59 units/km^{2}). The racial makeup of the county was 90.21% White, 7.90% Black or African American, 0.15% Native American, 0.45% Asian, 0.02% Pacific Islander, 0.21% from other races, and 1.07% from two or more races. 0.80% of the population were Hispanic or Latino of any race. 94.6% spoke English and 1.0% German as their first language.

There were 89,020 households, out of which 29.90% had children under the age of 18 living with them, 52.90% were married couples living together, 12.50% had a female householder with no husband present, and 30.70% were non-families. 26.90% of all households were made up of individuals, and 11.40% had someone living alone who was 65 years of age or older. The average household size was 2.48 and the average family size was 3.02.

In the county, the population was spread out, with 24.40% under the age of 18, 7.70% from 18 to 24, 27.30% from 25 to 44, 24.80% from 45 to 64, and 15.70% who were 65 years of age or older. The median age was 39 years. For every 100 females there were 93.80 males. For every 100 females age 18 and over, there were 90.60 males.

The median income for a household in the county was $38,298, and the median income for a family was $46,203. Males had a median income of $36,823 versus $24,443 for females. The per capita income for the county was $19,188. About 7.90% of families and 10.30% of the population were below the poverty line, including 15.40% of those under age 18 and 7.60% of those age 65 or over.

== Government and politics ==
Ohio law defines a structure for county government. Trumbull County has three-member board of county commissioners, a sheriff, coroner, auditor, treasurer, clerk of the court of common pleas prosecutor, engineer, and recorder. Trumbull County is represented as part of Ohio's 64th and 65th state house districts, and Ohio's 32nd senatorial district. It is also included in the Ohio Eleventh District Court of Appeals. Federally, it is part of Ohio's 14th congressional district.

Trumbull County was historically a Democratic stronghold; in 2016, however, Donald Trump won the county by a reasonably comfortable margin of 6.22%, being the first Republican to win the county since Richard Nixon in 1972. Trump expanded his margin in the county to 10.6 points in 2020 and to 16.8 in 2024. Trump's 2024 performance was the highest of any Republican presidential candidate since 1928.

United States presidential election results for Trumbull County, Ohio
Year	Republican		Democratic		Third party(ies)	
Year	No.	%	No.	%	No.	%
1856	4,049	67.63%	1,920	32.07%	18	0.30%
1860	4,349	69.22%	1,672	26.61%	262	4.17%
1864	5,093	72.83%	1,900	27.17%	0	0.00%
1868	5,338	69.77%	2,313	30.23%	0	0.00%
1872	5,869	70.68%	2,321	27.95%	114	1.37%
1876	6,133	63.77%	3,030	31.51%	454	4.72%
1880	6,796	66.39%	3,148	30.75%	293	2.86%
1884	6,521	65.35%	3,000	30.07%	457	4.58%
1888	6,299	62.47%	3,177	31.51%	607	6.02%
1892	5,819	59.45%	3,217	32.87%	752	7.68%
1896	7,867	66.23%	3,829	32.24%	182	1.53%
1900	7,723	65.71%	3,686	31.36%	344	2.93%
1904	7,383	68.37%	2,110	19.54%	1,306	12.09%
1908	6,978	58.00%	4,476	37.20%	577	4.80%
1912	2,633	23.15%	3,347	29.42%	5,395	47.43%
1916	6,167	47.15%	6,091	46.57%	822	6.28%
1920	17,343	68.66%	6,815	26.98%	1,101	4.36%
1924	22,341	74.35%	4,007	13.33%	3,701	12.32%
1928	29,710	75.80%	9,110	23.24%	374	0.95%
1932	23,029	53.66%	17,871	41.64%	2,013	4.69%
1936	16,887	33.55%	32,384	64.34%	1,058	2.10%
1940	25,026	41.96%	34,615	58.04%	0	0.00%
1944	25,150	42.30%	34,312	57.70%	0	0.00%
1948	25,297	39.91%	37,097	58.52%	998	1.57%
1952	37,793	49.17%	39,062	50.83%	0	0.00%
1956	43,936	57.17%	32,913	42.83%	0	0.00%
1960	40,724	46.46%	46,928	53.54%	0	0.00%
1964	27,059	33.24%	54,342	66.76%	0	0.00%
1968	33,076	39.97%	40,365	48.77%	9,319	11.26%
1972	47,680	55.92%	35,278	41.37%	2,308	2.71%
1976	36,469	39.41%	53,828	58.16%	2,247	2.43%
1980	41,056	44.15%	44,366	47.70%	7,580	8.15%
1984	45,623	44.18%	56,902	55.11%	734	0.71%
1988	38,815	39.51%	58,674	59.72%	761	0.77%
1992	25,831	24.01%	54,591	50.73%	27,184	25.26%
1996	24,811	26.19%	55,604	58.69%	14,330	15.12%
2000	34,654	36.01%	57,643	59.90%	3,942	4.10%
2004	40,977	37.89%	66,673	61.65%	495	0.46%
2008	40,164	37.44%	64,145	59.80%	2,962	2.76%
2012	38,279	37.54%	61,672	60.48%	2,012	1.97%
2016	49,024	50.71%	43,014	44.49%	4,638	4.80%
2020	55,194	54.57%	44,519	44.01%	1,439	1.42%
2024	55,983	57.66%	39,758	40.95%	1,355	1.40%

United States Senate election results for Trumbull County, Ohio1
Year	Republican		Democratic		Third party(ies)	
Year	No.	%	No.	%	No.	%
2024	48,755	50.97%	43,178	45.14%	3,722	3.89%

== Education ==
- Kent State University Trumbull is a regional campus of Kent State University, offering several associate degrees and a few bachelor's degrees.
- Trumbull Career and Technical Center is a vocational school, offering different learning and career advancement opportunities for both high school and adult learners.

School districts include:

- Bloomfield-Mespo Local School District
- Bristol Local School District
- Brookfield Local School District
- Cardinal Local School District
- Champion Local School District
- Girard City School District
- Howland Local School District
- Hubbard Exempted Village School District
- Jackson-Milton Local School District
- Joseph Badger Local School District
- LaBrae Local School District
- Lakeview Local School District
- Liberty Local School District
- Lordstown Local School District
- Maplewood Local School District
- Mathews Local School District
- McDonald Local School District
- Newton Falls Exempted Village School District
- Niles City School District
- Southington Local School District
- Warren City School District
- Weathersfield Local School District
- Youngstown City School District

== Communities ==
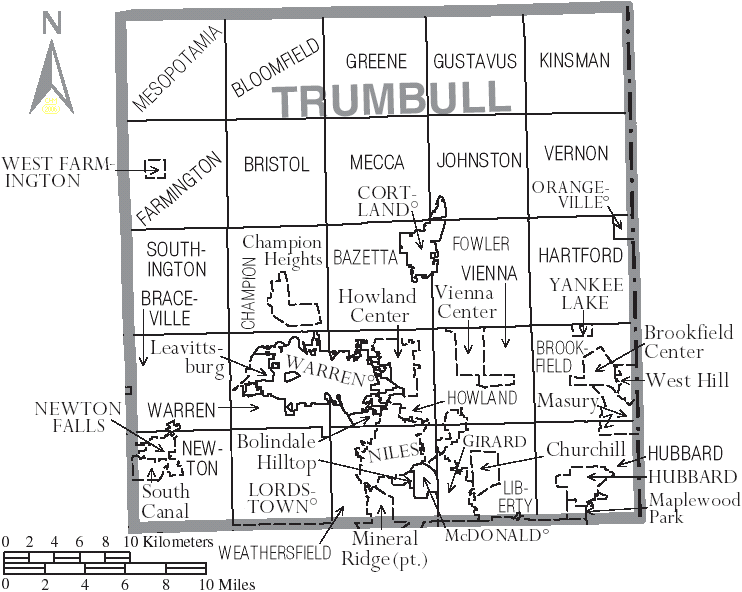
Map of Trumbull County, Ohio with municipal and township labels

=== Cities ===
- Cortland
- Girard
- Hubbard
- Niles
- Warren (county seat)
- Youngstown (part)

=== Villages ===
- Lordstown
- McDonald
- Newton Falls
- Orangeville
- West Farmington
- Yankee Lake

=== Townships ===
- Bazetta
- Bloomfield
- Braceville
- Bristol
- Brookfield
- Champion
- Farmington
- Fowler
- Greene
- Gustavus
- Hartford
- Howland
- Hubbard
- Johnston
- Kinsman
- Liberty
- Lordstown (paper)
- Mecca
- Mesopotamia
- Newton
- Southington
- Vernon
- Vienna
- Warren
- Weathersfield

=== Defunct township ===
- Lordstown Township

=== Census-designated places ===
- Bolindale
- Brookfield Center
- Champion Heights
- Churchill
- Hilltop
- Howland Center
- Kinsman Center
- Leavittsburg
- Maplewood Park
- Masury
- McKinley Heights
- Mineral Ridge
- Morgandale
- South Canal
- Vienna Center
- West Hill

=== Unincorporated communities ===
- Bristolville
- Burghill
- Center of the World
- Farmdale
- Fowler
- Hartford
- North Bloomfield
- Southington

=== Ghost towns ===
- Antietam (in Hartford)
- Bentley (in Brookfield)
- Brockway (in Hartford)
- Chestnut Ridge (in Hubbard)
- Dewey (in Kinsman)
- Doughton (in Hubbard)
- Germantown (in Hubbard)
- Kingsbury (in Mecca)
- Longsville (in Hubbard)
- Mosier (in Liberty)
- Oil Diggings (in Mecca)
- Old Burg Hill (in Hartford)
- Penza (Liberty/Hubbard border)
- Superior (in Vernon)
- Walnut Hill (in Brookfield)
- Wassie (Bristolville/Champion border)
- York (in Gustavus)
- Ohltown (in Weathersfield)

The Camp Ravenna Joint Military Training Center (formally known as the Ravenna Training and Logistics Site and commonly known as the Ravenna Arsenal) occupies a small part of Braceville Township.

== See also ==
- National Register of Historic Places listings in Trumbull County, Ohio
