= Hubbard Township, Trumbull County, Ohio =

Township in Ohio, US

- Township
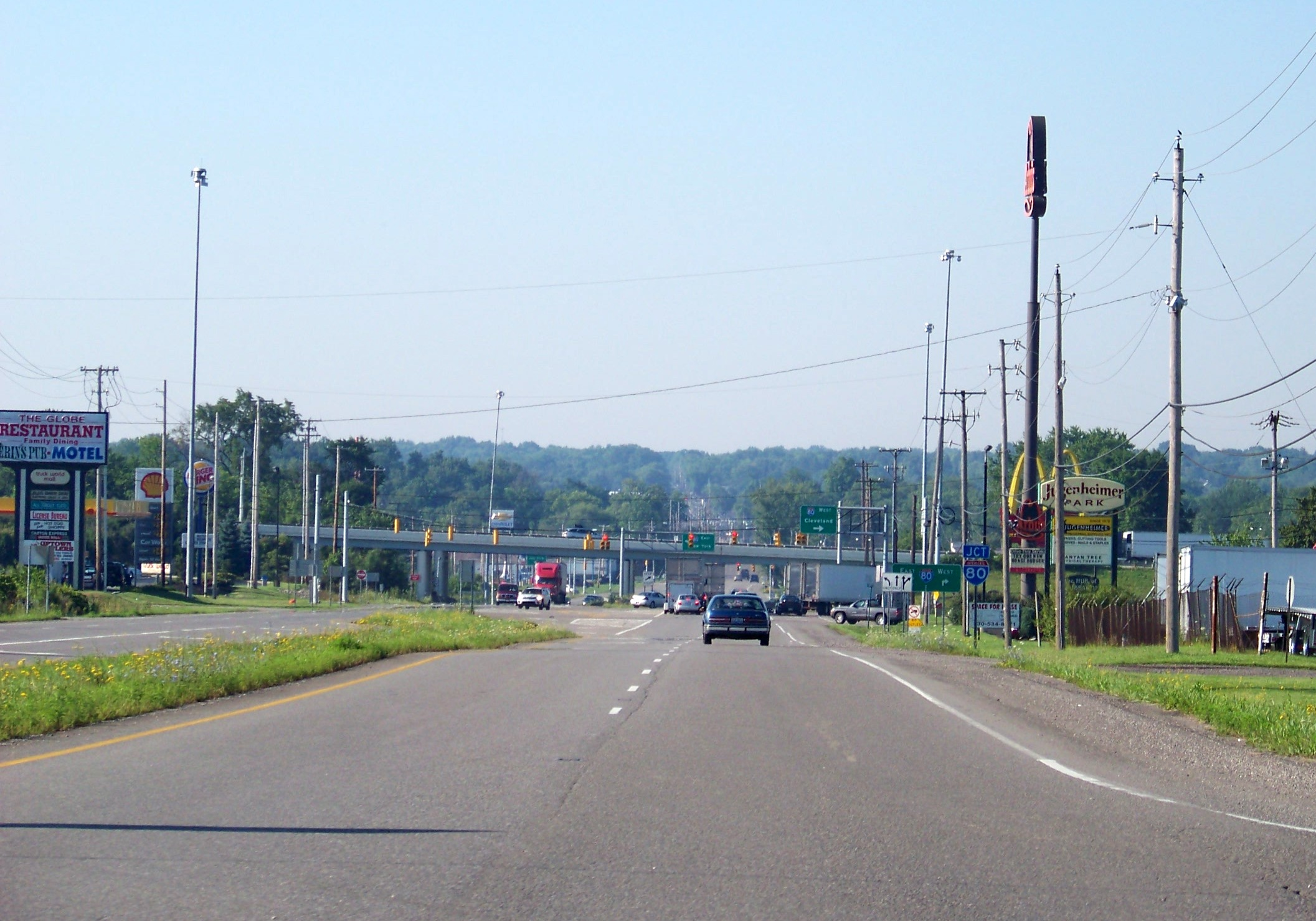
- Commercial development at Interstate 80 and State Route 7

- Flag Seal

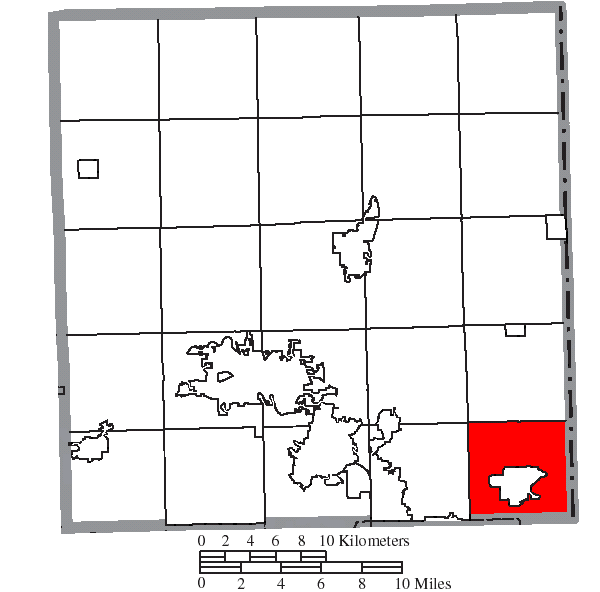
- Location of Hubbard Township in Trumbull County
- Coordinates: 41°9′54″N 80°34′14″W
- Country: United States
- State: Ohio
- County: Trumbull

Area
  - Total: 24.6 sq mi (63.7 km^{2})
  - Land: 24.5 sq mi (63.4 km^{2})
  - Water: 0.12 sq mi (0.3 km^{2})
- Elevation: 950 ft (290 m)

Population (2020)
  - Total: 12,969
  - Density: 530/sq mi (204.6/km^{2})
- Time zone: UTC-5 (Eastern (EST))
  - Summer (DST): UTC-4 (EDT)
- ZIP code: 44425
- Area codes: 234/330
- FIPS code: 39-36596
- GNIS feature ID: 1087034

Hubbard Township is one of the twenty-four townships of Trumbull County, Ohio, United States. The 2020 census found 12,969 people in the township. The city of Hubbard is located completely within Hubbard Township.

== Geography ==
Located in the southeastern corner of the county, it borders the following townships and cities:

- Brookfield Township – north
- Hermitage, Pennsylvania – northeast
- Shenango Township, Mercer County, Pennsylvania – east
- Coitsville Township, Mahoning County – south
- Youngstown – southwest
- Liberty Township – west
- Vienna Township – northwest corner

The city of Hubbard is located in central Hubbard Township, and the census-designated places of Maplewood Park and Masury are located in the township's south and northeast respectively.

== Name and history ==
Hubbard Township was established around 1806, deriving its name from Nehemiah Hubbard Jr., a Connecticut Land Company agent. It is the only Hubbard Township statewide.

== Government ==
The township is governed by a three-member board of trustees, who are elected in November of odd-numbered years to a four-year term beginning on the following January 1. Two are elected in the year after the presidential election and one is elected in the year before it. There is also an elected township fiscal officer, who serves a four-year term beginning on April 1 of the year after the election, which is held in November of the year before the presidential election. Vacancies in the fiscal officership or on the board of trustees are filled by the remaining trustees.
