= WHTX =

WHTX may refer to:

- WHTX-LD, a low-power television station (channel 43) licensed to serve Springfield, Massachusetts, United States
- WYWO, a radio station (1570 AM) licensed to serve Warren, Ohio, United States, which held the call sign WHTX from 2011 to 2026
- WAKZ, a radio station (95.9 FM) licensed to Sharpsville, Pennsylvania, United States, which held the call sign WHTX from 1992 to 1994
- WKST-FM, a radio station (96.1 FM) licensed to serve Pittsburgh, Pennsylvania, which held the call sign WHTX from 1983 to 1991
