= Weathersfield Township, Trumbull County, Ohio =

Township in Ohio, US

- Township
- Motto: "A Community of Neighbors"
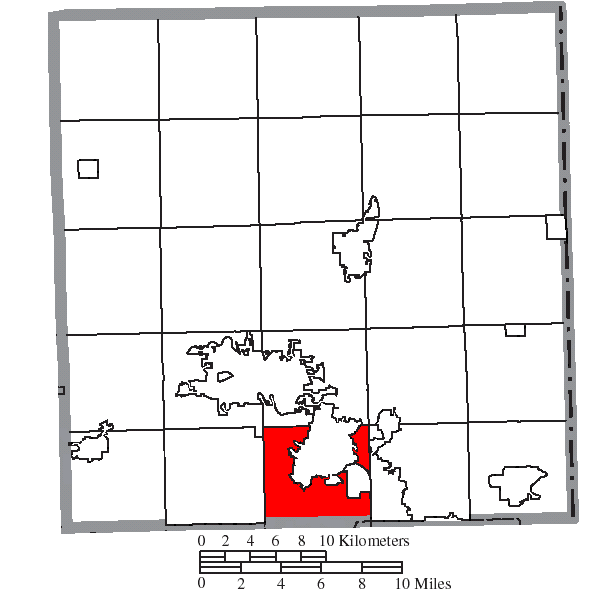
- Location of Weathersfield Township in Trumbull County
- Coordinates: 41°10′42″N 80°45′28″W
- Country: United States
- State: Ohio
- County: Trumbull

Area
  - Total: 23.3 sq mi (60.4 km^{2})
  - Land: 22.0 sq mi (57.1 km^{2})
  - Water: 1.3 sq mi (3.3 km^{2})
- Elevation: 899 ft (274 m)

Population (2020)
  - Total: 24,689
  - Density: 1,120/sq mi (432.4/km^{2})
- Time zone: UTC-5 (Eastern (EST))
  - Summer (DST): UTC-4 (EDT)
- FIPS code: 39-82446
- GNIS feature ID: 1087048
- Website: https://weathersfieldtwp.org/

Weathersfield Township is one of the twenty-four townships of Trumbull County, Ohio, United States. The 2020 census found 24,689 people in the township.>

== Geography ==
Located in the southern part of the county, it borders the following townships and municipalities:

- Howland Township - north
- Vienna Township - northeast corner
- Liberty Township - east
- Youngstown - southeast corner
- Austintown Township, Mahoning County - south
- Jackson Township, Mahoning County - southwest corner
- Lordstown - west
- Warren Township - northwest

Several populated places are located in Weathersfield Township:

- Much of the city of Niles, in the north
- The village of McDonald, in the east
- The census-designated place of Hilltop, in the east
- The census-designated place of McKinley Heights, in the northeast
- Part of the census-designated place of Mineral Ridge, in the south

== Name and history ==
It is the only Weathersfield Township statewide. It was named after Wethersfield, Connecticut.

== Government ==
The township is governed by a three-member board of trustees, who are elected in November of odd-numbered years to a four-year term beginning on the following January 1. Two are elected in the year after the presidential election and one is elected in the year before it. There is also an elected township fiscal officer, who serves a four-year term beginning on April 1 of the year after the election, which is held in November of the year before the presidential election. Vacancies in the fiscal officership or on the board of trustees are filled by the remaining trustees.
