= Bobby Jones (wide receiver) =

American football player (born 1955)

No. 89
- Position: Wide receiver

Personal information
- Born: July 12, 1955 (age 71); Sharon, Pennsylvania, U.S.
- Listed height: 5 ft 11 in (1.80 m)
- Listed weight: 180 lb (82 kg)

Career information
- High school: Brookfield (OH)
- College: Millikin
- NFL draft: 1978: undrafted

Career history
- New York Jets (1978–1982); Cleveland Browns (1983)

Career NFL statistics
- Receptions: 89
- Receiving yards: 1,368
- Receiving touchdowns: 6
- Stats at Pro Football Reference

Robert Ellis Jones (born July 12, 1955) is an American former professional football player who was a wide receiver in the National Football League (NFL). He played for the New York Jets and Cleveland Browns from 1978 to 1983. He did not play college football and signed with the Jets after a tryout in 1978.
