= Orangeville, Ohio =

- Village
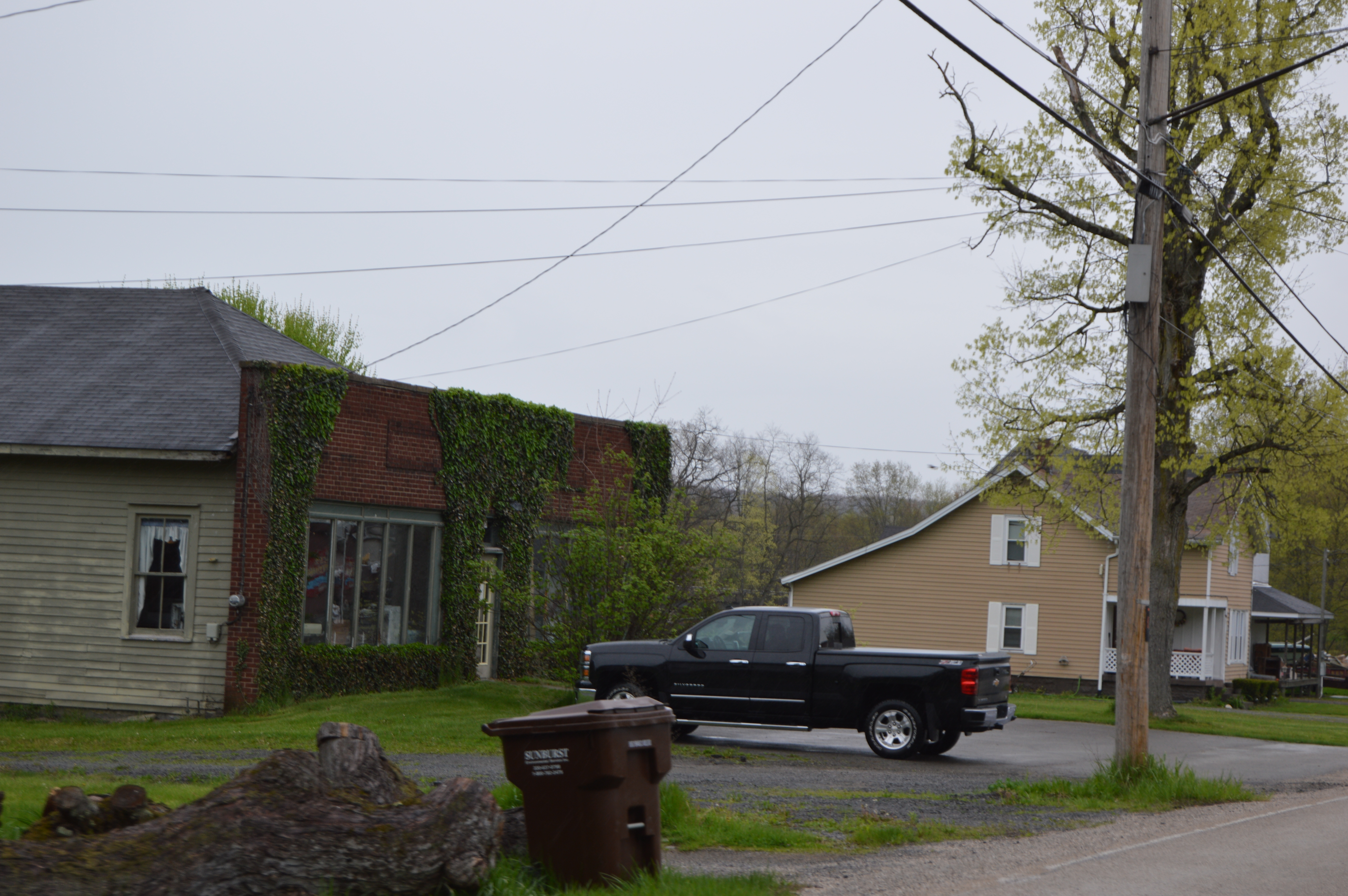
- Hartford Street

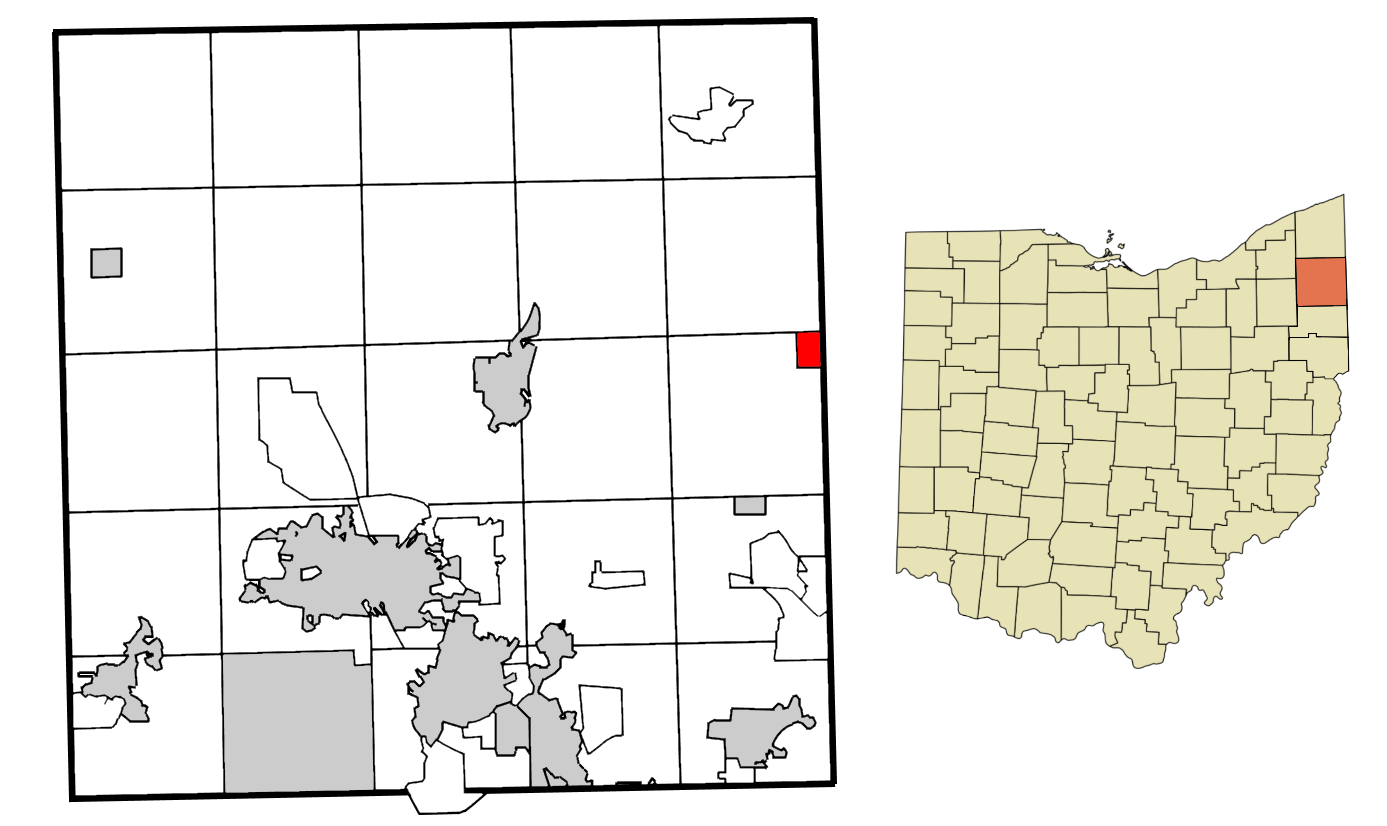
- Location of Orangeville in Trumbull County, Ohio.
- Coordinates: 41°20′32″N 80°31′39″W
- Country: United States
- State: Ohio
- County: Trumbull

Area
  - Total: 1.05 sq mi (2.71 km^{2})
  - Land: 0.75 sq mi (1.93 km^{2})
  - Water: 0.30 sq mi (0.78 km^{2})
- Elevation: 922 ft (281 m)

Population (2020)
  - Total: 174
  - Density: 234/sq mi (90.2/km^{2})
- Time zone: UTC-5 (Eastern (EST))
  - Summer (DST): UTC-4 (EDT)
- ZIP code: 44453
- Area codes: 234/330
- FIPS code: 39-58674
- GNIS feature ID: 1087042

Orangeville is a village in eastern Trumbull County, Ohio, United States, along the state line with Pennsylvania. The population was 174 at the 2020 census. It is part of the Youngstown–Warren metropolitan area.

== History ==
A post office called Orangeville has been in operation since 1840. The etymology of the name Orangeville is obscure; the name may be a transfer from Orange, Connecticut.

== Geography ==
Orangeville is one of the easternmost incorporated communities in Ohio.

According to the United States Census Bureau, the village has a total area of 1.16 square miles (3.00 km^{2}), of which 0.84 square miles (2.18 km^{2}) is land and 0.32 square miles (0.83 km^{2}) is water.

== Demographics ==
Historical population
Census	Pop.	Note	%±
1870	260		—
1900	223		—
1910	185		−17.0%
1920	222		20.0%
1930	223		0.5%
1940	265		18.8%
1950	367		38.5%
1960	397		8.2%
1970	268		−32.5%
1980	223		−16.8%
1990	253		13.5%
2000	189		−25.3%
2010	197		4.2%
2020	174		−11.7%
U.S. Decennial Census

=== 2010 census ===
As of the census of 2010, there were 197 people, 75 households, and 57 families living in the village. The population density was 234.5 inhabitants per square mile (90.5/km^{2}). There were 85 housing units at an average density of 101.2 per square mile (39.1/km^{2}). The racial makeup of the village was 95.4% White, 1.0% African American, 0.5% Asian, 2.0% from other races, and 1.0% from two or more races. Hispanic or Latino of any race were 1.0% of the population.

There were 75 households, of which 34.7% had children under the age of 18 living with them, 61.3% were married couples living together, 9.3% had a female householder with no husband present, 5.3% had a male householder with no wife present, and 24.0% were non-families. 22.7% of all households were made up of individuals, and 8% had someone living alone who was 65 years of age or older. The average household size was 2.63 and the average family size was 3.11.

The median age in the village was 38.4 years. 26.9% of residents were under the age of 18; 6.6% were between the ages of 18 and 24; 22.4% were from 25 to 44; 28.9% were from 45 to 64; and 15.2% were 65 years of age or older. The gender makeup of the village was 52.8% male and 47.2% female.

=== 2000 census ===
As of the census of 2000, there were 189 people, 76 households, and 51 families living in the village. The population density was 238.4 inhabitants per square mile (92.0/km^{2}). There were 80 housing units at an average density of 100.9 per square mile (39.0/km^{2}). The racial makeup of the village was 96.83% White, 2.12% Native American, and 1.06% from two or more races.

There were 76 households, out of which 30.3% had children under the age of 18 living with them, 57.9% were married couples living together, 9.2% had a female householder with no husband present, and 31.6% were non-families. 28.9% of all households were made up of individuals, and 13.2% had someone living alone who was 65 years of age or older. The average household size was 2.49 and the average family size was 3.10.

In the village, the population was spread out, with 23.3% under the age of 18, 7.4% from 18 to 24, 30.2% from 25 to 44, 30.7% from 45 to 64, and 8.5% who were 65 years of age or older. The median age was 39 years. For every 100 females there were 98.9 males. For every 100 females age 18 and over, there were 95.9 males.

The median income for a household in the village was $44,375, and the median income for a family was $47,083. Males had a median income of $36,071 versus $25,625 for females. The per capita income for the village was $16,530. None of the population or families were below the poverty line.
