= Hilltop, Ohio =

Community in Trumbull County, Ohio, United States

- Census-designated place
- Flag

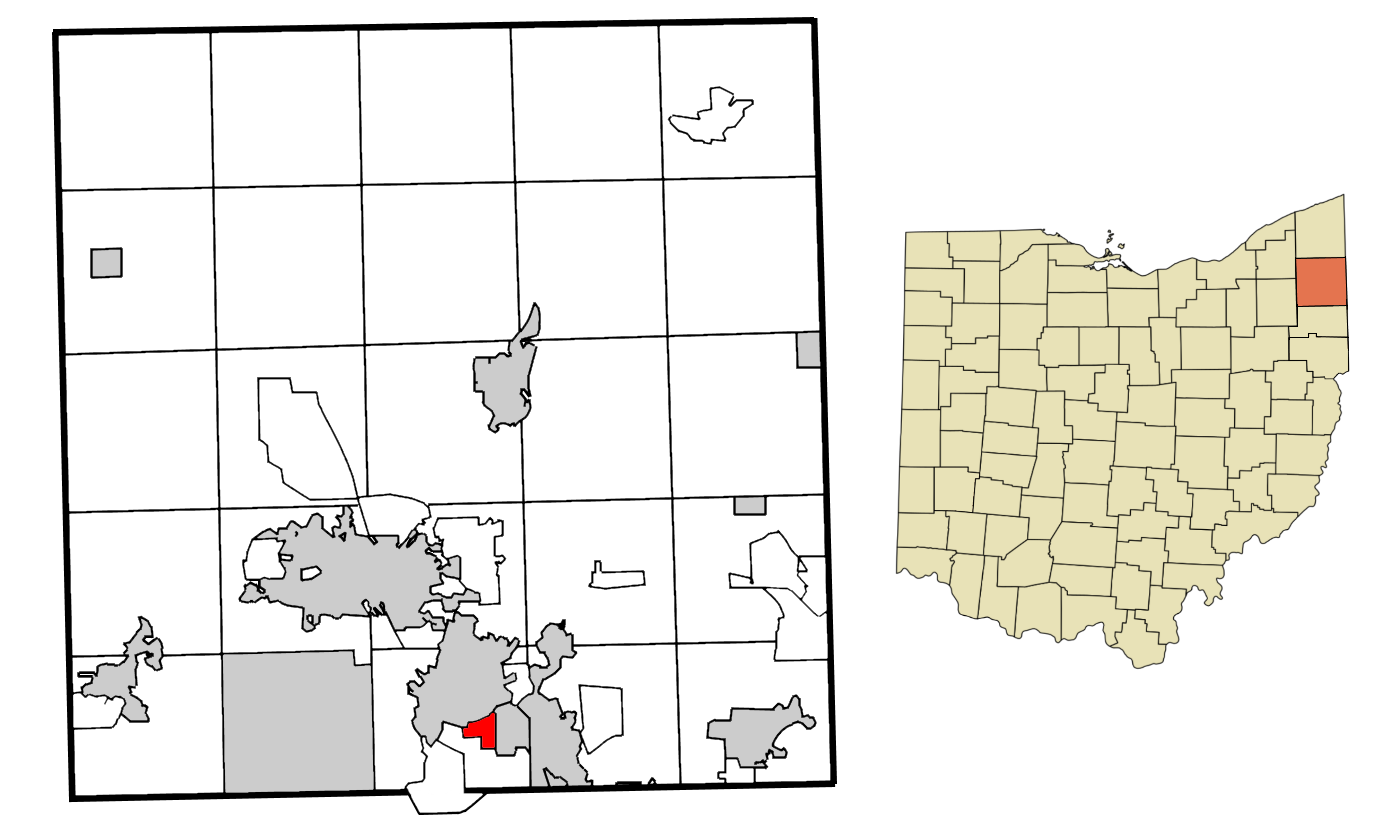
- Location of Hilltop in Trumbull County, Ohio
- Coordinates: 41°09′46″N 80°44′40″W
- Country: United States
- State: Ohio
- County: Trumbull
- Township: Weathersfield

Area
  - Total: 0.75 sq mi (1.94 km^{2})
  - Land: 0.75 sq mi (1.94 km^{2})
  - Water: 0 sq mi (0.00 km^{2})
- Elevation: 942 ft (287 m)

Population (2020)
  - Total: 658
  - Density: 876.2/sq mi (338.32/km^{2})
- Time zone: UTC-5 (Eastern (EST))
  - Summer (DST): UTC-4 (EDT)
- FIPS code: 39-35613
- GNIS feature ID: 2393051

Hilltop is an unincorporated community and census-designated place in central Weathersfield Township, Trumbull County, Ohio, United States. The population was 658 at the 2020 census. It is part of the Youngstown–Warren metropolitan area.

== Geography ==
According to the United States Census Bureau, the CDP has a total area of 0.6 square miles (1.6 km^{2}), all land.

== Demographics ==
Historical population
Census	Pop.	Note	%±
2000	534		—
2010	532		−0.4%
2020	658		23.7%
U.S. Decennial Census

As of the census of 2000, there were 534 people, 199 households, and 160 families residing in the CDP. The population density was 940.4 inhabitants per square mile (363.1/km^{2}). There were 208 housing units at an average density of 366.3 per square mile (141.4/km^{2}). The racial makeup of the CDP was 96.44% White, 0.75% African American, 0.94% Native American, 0.37% from other races, and 1.50% from two or more races. Hispanic or Latino of any race were 1.31% of the population.

There were 199 households, out of which 33.7% had children under the age of 18 living with them, 62.8% were married couples living together, 11.6% had a female householder with no husband present, and 19.1% were non-families. 19.1% of all households were made up of individuals, and 8.0% had someone living alone who was 65 years of age or older. The average household size was 2.68 and the average family size was 3.01.

In the CDP the population was spread out, with 24.9% under the age of 18, 6.9% from 18 to 24, 32.0% from 25 to 44, 24.3% from 45 to 64, and 11.8% who were 65 years of age or older. The median age was 37 years. For every 100 females there were 100.8 males. For every 100 females age 18 and over, there were 97.5 males.

The median income for a household in the CDP was $43,036, and the median income for a family was $50,441. Males had a median income of $36,406 versus $20,962 for females. The per capita income for the CDP was $15,417. About 4.6% of families and 4.9% of the population were below the poverty line, including 3.7% of those under age 18 and 7.9% of those age 65 or over.
