= Morgandale, Ohio =

- Census-designated place
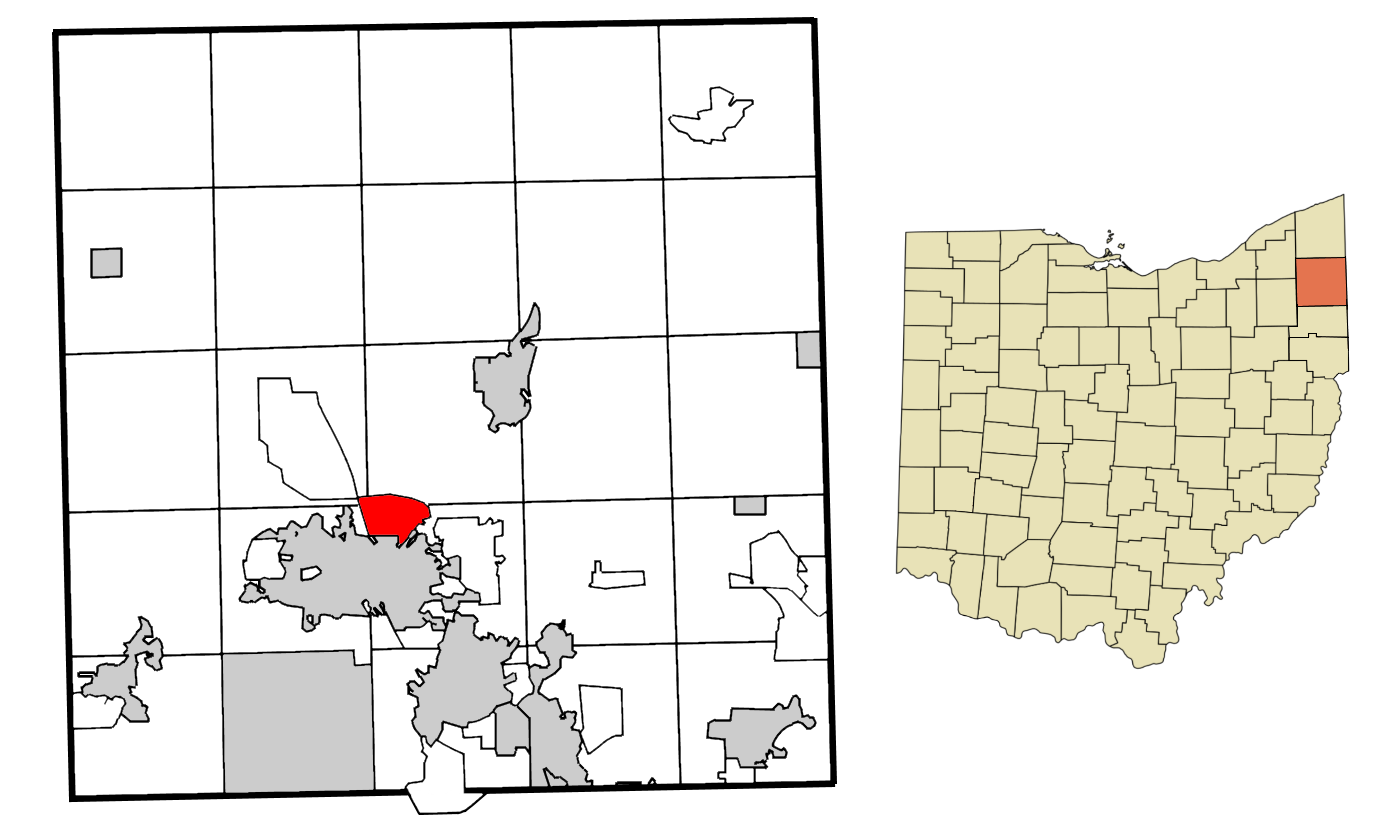
- Location of Morgandale in Trumbull County, Ohio.
- Coordinates: 41°16′01″N 80°47′45″W
- Country: United States
- State: Ohio
- County: Trumbull

Area
  - Total: 2.65 sq mi (6.87 km^{2})
  - Land: 2.65 sq mi (6.87 km^{2})
  - Water: 0 sq mi (0.00 km^{2})
- Elevation: 932 ft (284 m)

Population (2020)
  - Total: 1,139
  - Density: 429.2/sq mi (165.73/km^{2})
- Time zone: UTC-5 (Eastern (EST))
  - Summer (DST): UTC-4 (EDT)
- Area codes: 234/330
- GNIS feature ID: 2584368

Morgandale is an unincorporated community and census-designated place in Trumbull County, Ohio, United States. The population was 1,139 at the 2020 census. It is part of the Youngstown–Warren metropolitan area.

== Geography ==
According to the U.S. Census Bureau, the community has an area of 2.658 square miles (6.88 km^{2}), all of it land.

== Demographics ==
Historical population
| Census | Pop. | Note | %± |
|---|---|---|---|
| 2010 | 1,224 | | — |
| 2020 | 1,139 | | −6.9% |
U.S. Decennial Census
