= McKinley Heights, Ohio =

- Census-designated place
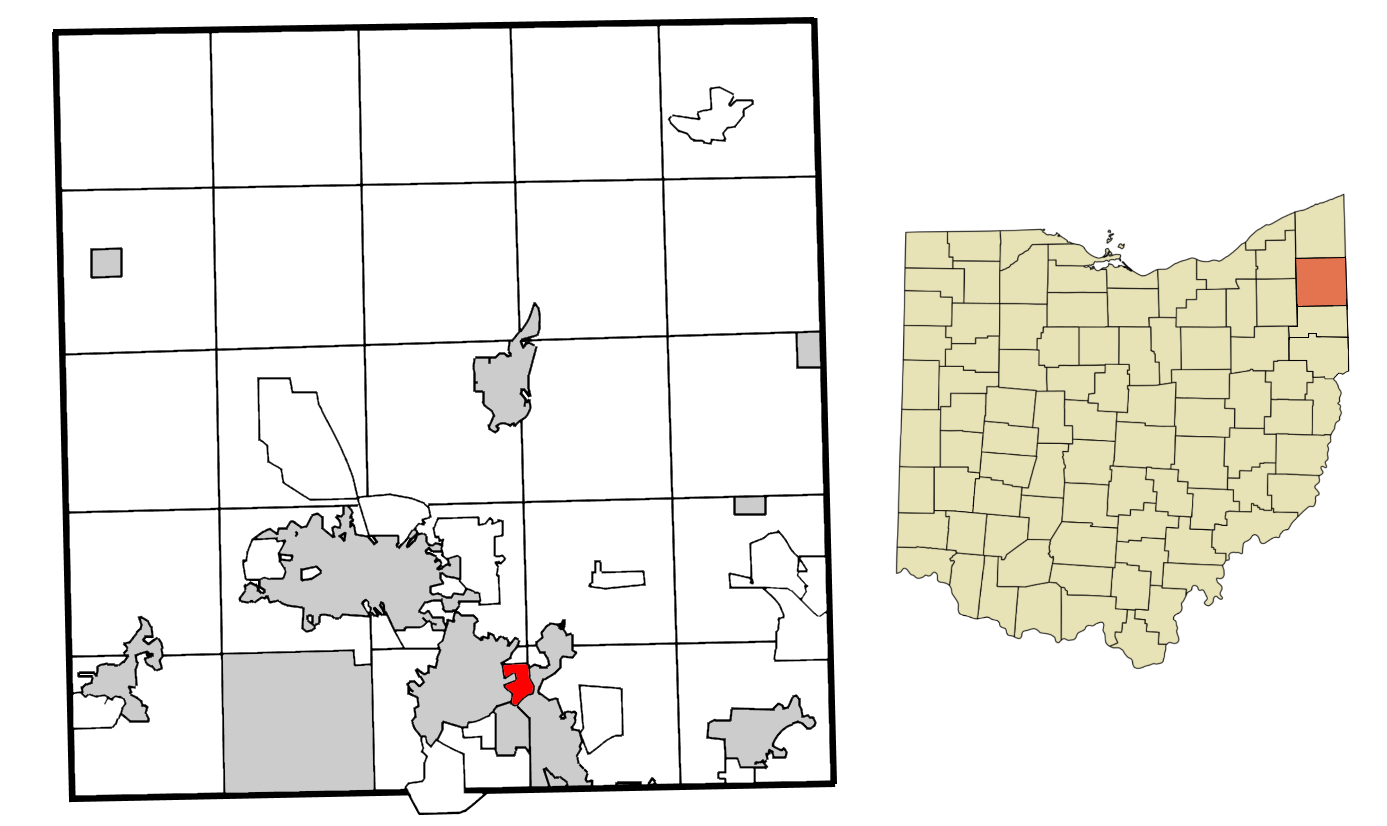
- Location of McKinley Heights in Trumbull County, Ohio.
- Coordinates: 41°11′10″N 80°43′04″W
- Country: United States
- State: Ohio
- County: Trumbull

Area
  - Total: 0.91 sq mi (2.35 km^{2})
  - Land: 0.91 sq mi (2.35 km^{2})
  - Water: 0 sq mi (0.00 km^{2})
- Elevation: 991 ft (302 m)

Population (2020)
  - Total: 950
  - Density: 1,048.9/sq mi (404.99/km^{2})
- Time zone: UTC-5 (Eastern (EST))
  - Summer (DST): UTC-4 (EDT)
- Area codes: 234/330
- GNIS feature ID: 2584366

McKinley Heights is an unincorporated community and census-designated place in northeastern Weathersfield Township, Trumbull County, Ohio, United States. The population was 950 at the 2020 census. It is part of the Youngstown–Warren metropolitan area. The community is located at the intersection of U.S. Route 422 and Ohio State Route 169.

== Geography ==
According to the U.S. Census Bureau, the community has an area of 0.871 square miles (2.26 km^{2}), all land.

== Demographics ==
Historical population
Census	Pop.	Note	%±
2010	1,060		—
2020	950		−10.4%
U.S. Decennial Census

McKinley Heights contains 1060 residents, in which 97% are white/caucasian. There are 533 male residents and 527 female residents of the town.
