= West Hill, Ohio =

- Census-designated place
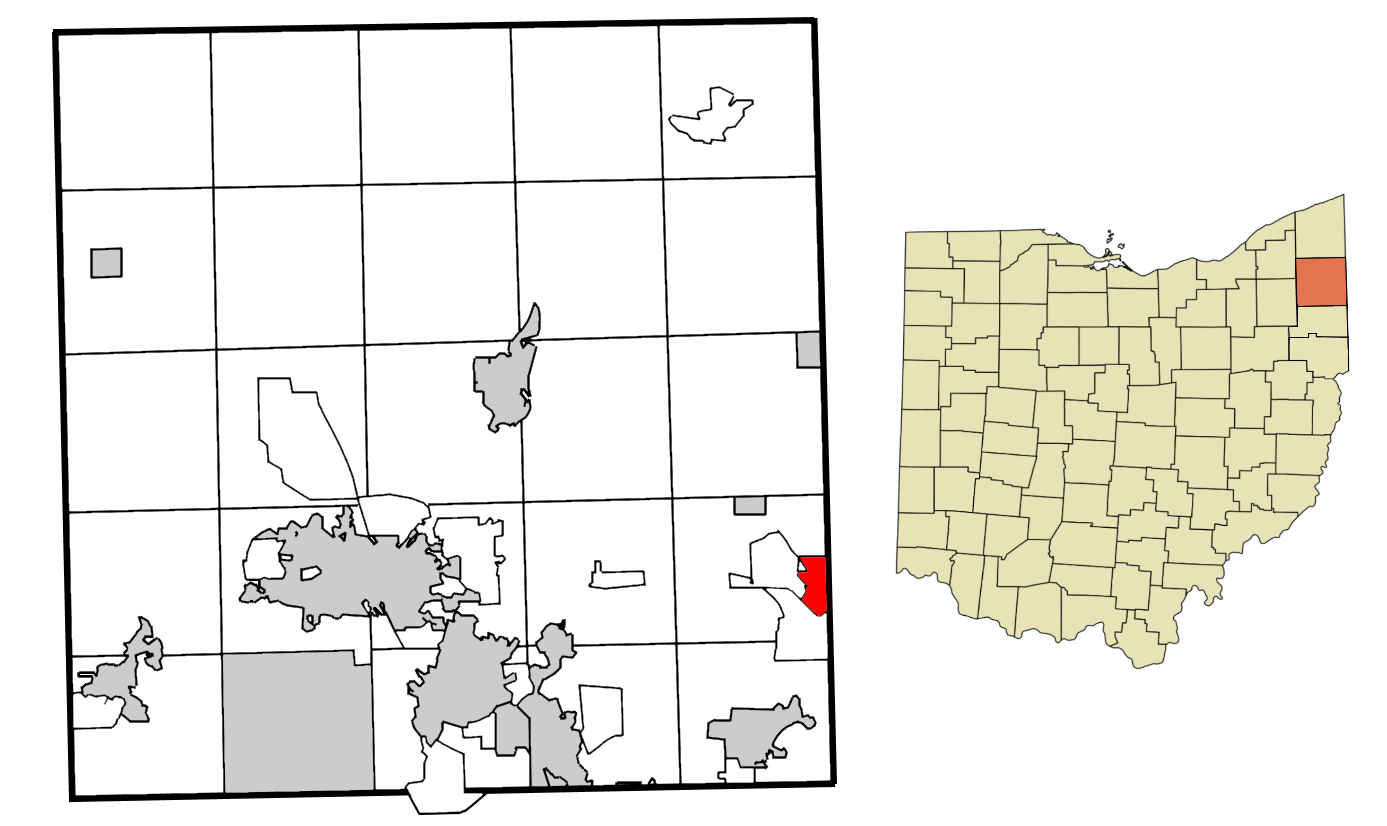
- Location of West Hill in Trumbull County, Ohio.
- Coordinates: 41°13′48″N 80°31′37″W
- Country: United States
- State: Ohio
- County: Trumbull

Area
  - Total: 1.48 sq mi (3.84 km^{2})
  - Land: 1.48 sq mi (3.84 km^{2})
  - Water: 0 sq mi (0.00 km^{2})
- Elevation: 902 ft (275 m)

Population (2020)
  - Total: 2,218
  - Density: 1,497.3/sq mi (578.12/km^{2})
- Time zone: UTC-5 (Eastern (EST))
  - Summer (DST): UTC-4 (EDT)
- Area code: 604305
- FIPS code: 39-83541
- GNIS feature ID: 2393842

West Hill is an unincorporated community and census-designated place in eastern Brookfield Township, Trumbull County, Ohio, United States. The population was 2,218 at the 2020 census. It is part of the Youngstown–Warren metropolitan area.

== Geography ==
According to the United States Census Bureau, the CDP has a total area of 1.6 square miles (4.1 km^{2}), all land.

== Demographics ==
Historical population
| Census | Pop. | Note | %± |
|---|---|---|---|
| 2000 | 2,523 | | — |
| 2010 | 2,237 | | −11.3% |
| 2020 | 2,218 | | −0.8% |
U.S. Decennial Census

As of the census of 2000, there were 2,523 people, 1,038 households, and 629 families residing in the CDP. The population density was 1,543.7 inhabitants per square mile (596.0/km^{2}). There were 1,108 housing units at an average density of 677.9 per square mile (261.7/km^{2}). The racial makeup of the CDP was 87.51% White, 10.50% African American, 0.16% Native American, 0.36% Asian, 0.04% Pacific Islander, 0.24% from other races, and 1.19% from two or more races. Hispanic or Latino of any race were 0.71% of the population.

There were 1,038 households, out of which 27.7% had children under the age of 18 living with them, 42.8% were married couples living together, 11.2% had a female householder with no husband present, and 39.4% were non-families. 34.8% of all households were made up of individuals, and 15.2% had someone living alone who was 65 years of age or older. The average household size was 2.31 and the average family size was 2.99.

In the CDP the population was spread out, with 22.9% under the age of 18, 8.0% from 18 to 24, 28.3% from 25 to 44, 21.0% from 45 to 64, and 19.8% who were 65 years of age or older. The median age was 39 years. For every 100 females there were 93.3 males. For every 100 females age 18 and over, there were 88.7 males.

The median income for a household in the CDP was $28,175, and the median income for a family was $42,548. Males had a median income of $32,384 versus $18,393 for females. The per capita income for the CDP was $21,813. About 9.4% of families and 13.3% of the population were below the poverty line, including 22.9% of those under age 18 and 6.6% of those age 65 or over.
