= Maplewood Park, Ohio =

- Census-designated place
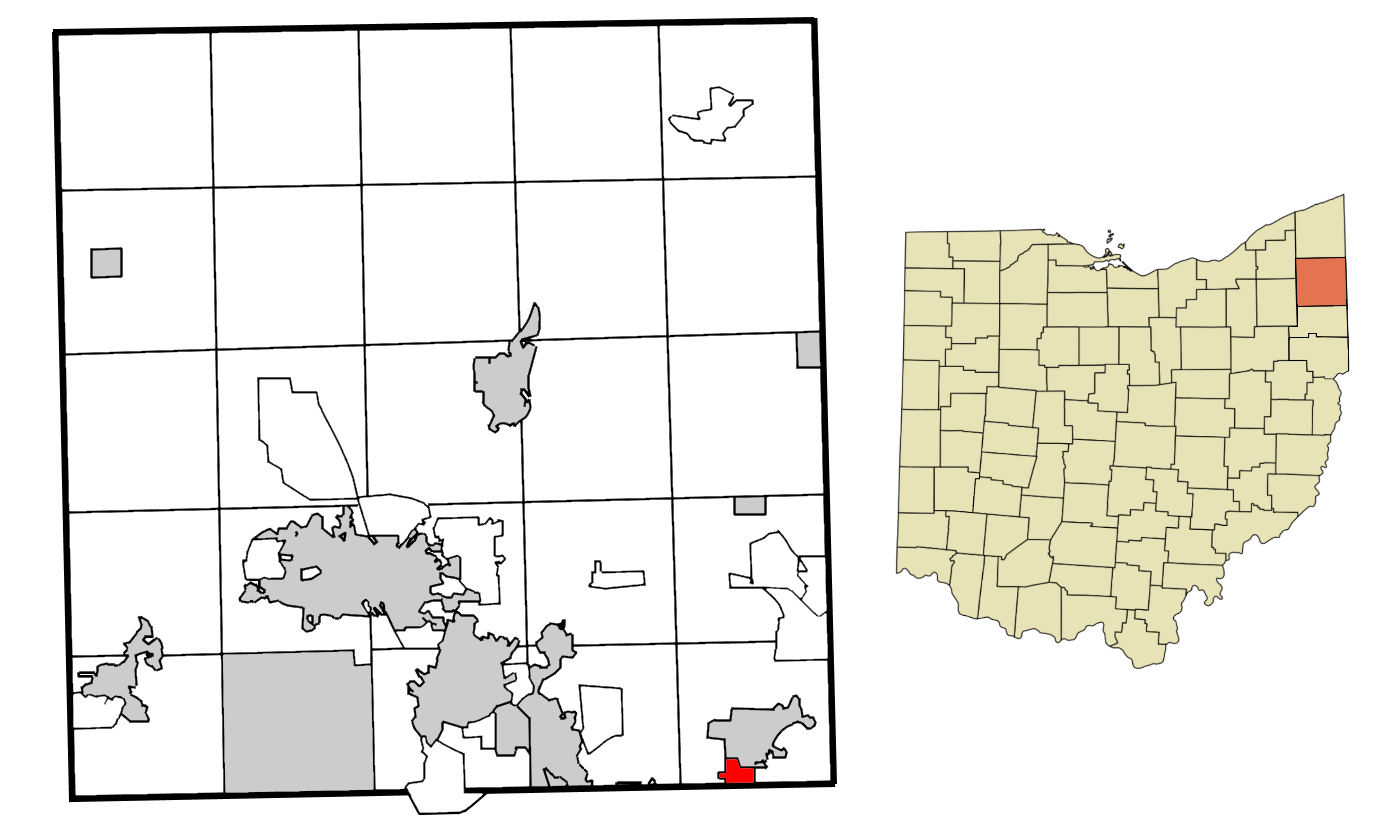
- Location of Maplewood Park in Trumbull County, Ohio.
- Coordinates: 41°08′21″N 80°34′47″W
- Country: United States
- State: Ohio
- County: Trumbull

Area
  - Total: 0.79 sq mi (2.04 km^{2})
  - Land: 0.79 sq mi (2.04 km^{2})
  - Water: 0 sq mi (0.00 km^{2})
- Elevation: 1,066 ft (325 m)

Population (2020)
  - Total: 243
  - Density: 307.9/sq mi (118.88/km^{2})
- Time zone: UTC-5 (Eastern (EST))
  - Summer (DST): UTC-4 (EDT)
- FIPS code: 39-47445
- GNIS feature ID: 2393120

Maplewood Park is an unincorporated community and census-designated place in southern Hubbard Township, Trumbull County, Ohio, United States. The population was 243 at the 2020 census. It is part of the Youngstown–Warren metropolitan area.

== Geography ==
According to the United States Census Bureau, the CDP has a total area of 0.8 square miles (2.1 km^{2}), all land.

== Demographics ==
Historical population
Census	Pop.	Note	%±
2000	321		—
2010	280		−12.8%
2020	243		−13.2%
U.S. Decennial Census

=== 2020 census ===
Maplewood Park CDP, Ohio – Racial and ethnic composition Note: the US Census treats Hispanic/Latino as an ethnic category. This table excludes Latinos from the racial categories and assigns them to a separate category. Hispanics/Latinos may be of any race.
Race / Ethnicity (NH = Non-Hispanic)	Pop 2000	Pop 2010	Pop 2020	% 2000	% 2010	% 2020
White alone (NH)	130	127	117	40.50%	45.36%	48.15%
Black or African American alone (NH)	187	134	97	58.26%	47.86%	39.92%
Native American or Alaska Native alone (NH)	1	0	0	0.31%	0.00%	0.00%
Asian alone (NH)	0	0	2	0.00%	0.00%	0.82%
Native Hawaiian or Pacific Islander alone (NH)	0	0	0	0.00%	0.00%	0.00%
Other race alone (NH)	0	0	2	0.00%	0.00%	0.82%
Mixed race or Multiracial (NH)	3	14	14	0.93%	5.00%	5.76%
Hispanic or Latino (any race)	0	5	11	0.00%	1.79%	4.53%
Total	321	280	243	100.00%	100.00%	100.00%

=== 2000 censis ===
As of the census of 2000, there were 321 people, 123 households, and 91 families residing in the CDP. The population density was 427.9 inhabitants per square mile (165.2/km^{2}). There were 132 housing units at an average density of 176.0 per square mile (68.0/km^{2}). The racial makeup of the CDP was 40.50% White, 58.26% African American, 0.31% Native American, and 0.93% from two or more races.

There were 123 households, out of which 26.8% had children under the age of 18 living with them, 49.6% were married couples living together, 18.7% had a female householder with no husband present, and 26.0% were non-families. 23.6% of all households were made up of individuals, and 10.6% had someone living alone who was 65 years of age or older. The average household size was 2.61 and the average family size was 3.09.

In the CDP the population was spread out, with 23.7% under the age of 18, 6.5% from 18 to 24, 26.2% from 25 to 44, 23.1% from 45 to 64, and 20.6% who were 65 years of age or older. The median age was 41 years. For every 100 females there were 99.4 males. For every 100 females age 18 and over, there were 88.5 males.

The median income for a household in the CDP was $24,318, and the median income for a family was $30,795. Males had a median income of $16,458 versus $13,929 for females. The per capita income for the CDP was $12,904. About 14.6% of families and 19.1% of the population were below the poverty line, including 68.2% of those under age 18 and 16.7% of those age 65 or over.
