= Lordstown Local School District =

Location
- 1824 Salt Springs Road; Warren, Ohio 44481; United States

Information
- Type: Public
- NCES District ID: 3905020
- Teaching staff: 36.56 (FTE)
- Grades: K-12
- Enrollment: 383 (2024-25)
- Student to teacher ratio: 10.48
- Colors: Red and blue
- Team name: Red Devils
- Website: www.lordstown.k12.oh.us/hs

The Lordstown Local School District is a school district located in Lordstown, Trumbull County, Ohio, United States. The school district serves one high school, one middle school, and one elementary school.

== History ==
Lordstown Local School District formed sometime in the early 1900s, when small one-room schools and small local schools consolidated to form a centralized public school. The district celebrated its 100th graduating class in 2018.

In 1917, a brick school building that housed the entire school district at one point was constructed. it was demolished in August 2016.

Lordstown High School was constructed at its current location in 1977, along with the Lordstown Elementary School in 1978.

== Schools ==
Schools within the district consist of

=== High School ===
- Lordstown High School

=== Middle School ===
- Lordstown Middle School

=== Elementary School ===
- Lordstown Elementary School
