= Masury, Ohio =

- Census-designated place
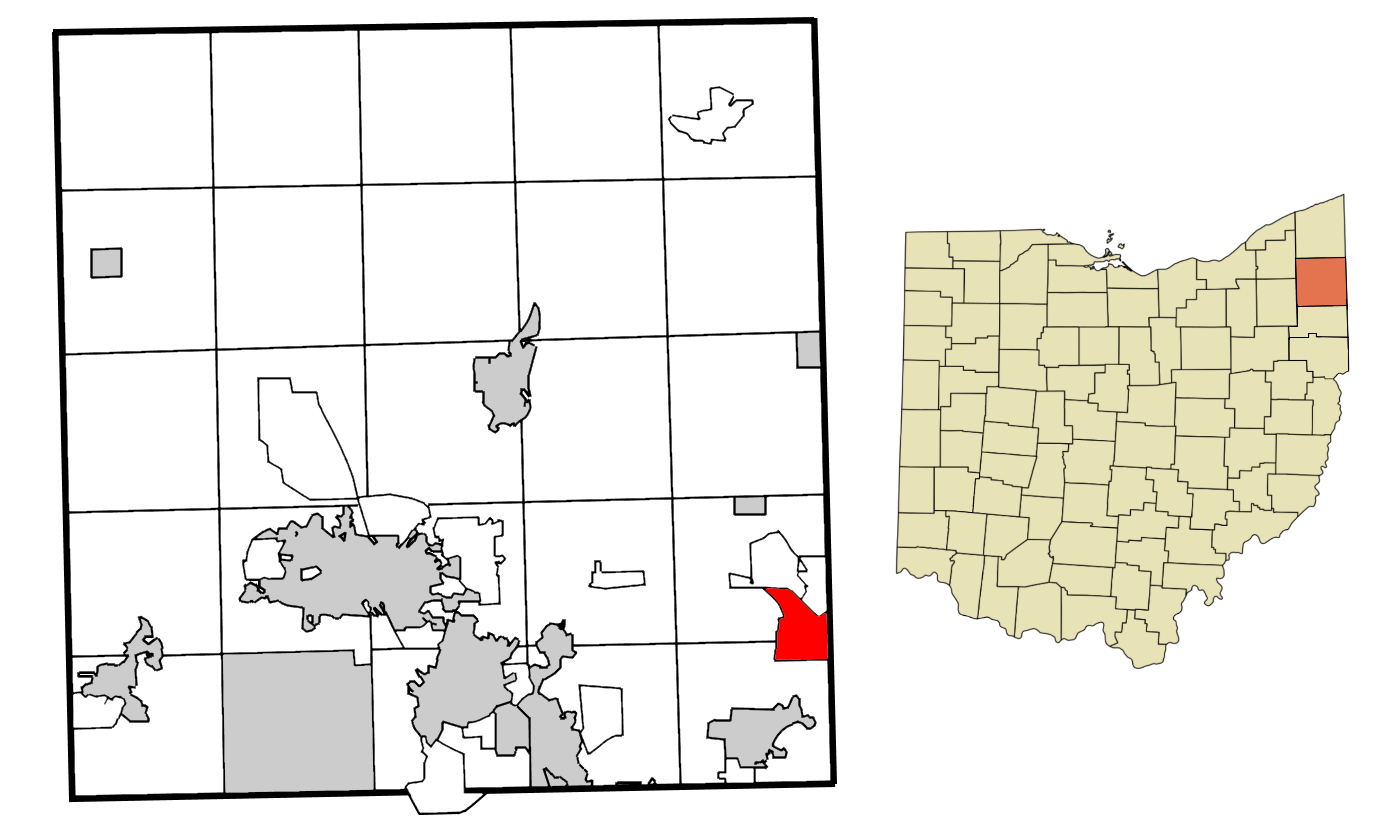
- Location of Masury in Trumbull County, Ohio.
- Coordinates: 41°12′30″N 80°32′16″W
- Country: United States
- State: Ohio
- County: Trumbull

Area
  - Total: 3.48 sq mi (9.01 km^{2})
  - Land: 3.46 sq mi (8.97 km^{2})
  - Water: 0.019 sq mi (0.05 km^{2})
- Elevation: 906 ft (276 m)

Population (2020)
  - Total: 2,001
  - Density: 578.0/sq mi (223.15/km^{2})
- Time zone: UTC-5 (Eastern (EST))
  - Summer (DST): UTC-4 (EDT)
- ZIP code: 44438
- Area codes: 234/330
- FIPS code: 39-48272
- GNIS feature ID: 2393122

Masury (/ˈmeɪzəri/ MAY-zər-ee) is an unincorporated community and census-designated place in Brookfield and Hubbard Townships in eastern Trumbull County, Ohio, United States. The population was 2,001 at the 2020 census. It is part of the Youngstown–Warren metropolitan area.

== History ==
The community has the name of Colonel Fred L. M. Masury, a first settler.

At 7:10 p.m. on May 31, 1985, Masury was struck by an F-5 tornado as it passed through Hubbard into Wheatland, Pennsylvania. One person died in Masury as a result of the tornado. The base of the tornado spread over half a mile and wind speed was estimated at over 300 mph. The storm moved through Masury quickly and went on to destroy nearly 95% of Wheatland's industrial area.

== Geography ==
According to the United States Census Bureau, the CDP has a total area of 3.7 square miles (9.6 km^{2}), of which 3.6 square miles (9.3 km^{2}) is land and 0.04 square miles (0.10 km^{2}) (0.82%) is water.

== Demographics ==
Historical population
| Census | Pop. | Note | %± |
|---|---|---|---|
| 2000 | 2,618 | | — |
| 2010 | 2,064 | | −21.2% |
| 2020 | 2,001 | | −3.1% |
U.S. Decennial Census

As of the census of 2000, there were 2,618 people, 1,044 households, and 722 families residing in the CDP. The population density was 723.8 inhabitants per square mile (279.5/km^{2}). There were 1,096 housing units at an average density of 303.0 per square mile (117.0/km^{2}). The racial makeup of the CDP was 94.61% White, 3.28% African American, 0.04% Native American, 0.19% Asian, 0.31% from other races, and 1.57% from two or more races. Hispanic or Latino of any race were 0.84% of the population.

There were 1,044 households, out of which 30.8% had children under the age of 18 living with them, 50.9% were married couples living together, 14.5% had a female householder with no husband present, and 30.8% were non-families. 27.6% of all households were made up of individuals, and 12.9% had someone living alone who was 65 years of age or older. The average household size was 2.41 and the average family size was 2.92.

In the CDP the population was spread out, with 23.6% under the age of 18, 7.6% from 18 to 24, 26.7% from 25 to 44, 23.4% from 45 to 64, and 18.8% who were 65 years of age or older. The median age was 40 years. For every 100 females there were 84.2 males. For every 100 females age 18 and over, there were 83.1 males.

The median income for a household in the CDP was $36,958, and the median income for a family was $45,302. Males had a median income of $40,088 versus $21,535 for females. The per capita income for the CDP was $17,226. About 12.5% of families and 12.9% of the population were below the poverty line, including 20.7% of those under age 18 and 10.1% of those age 65 or over.
