= Brookfield Center, Ohio =

- Census-designated place
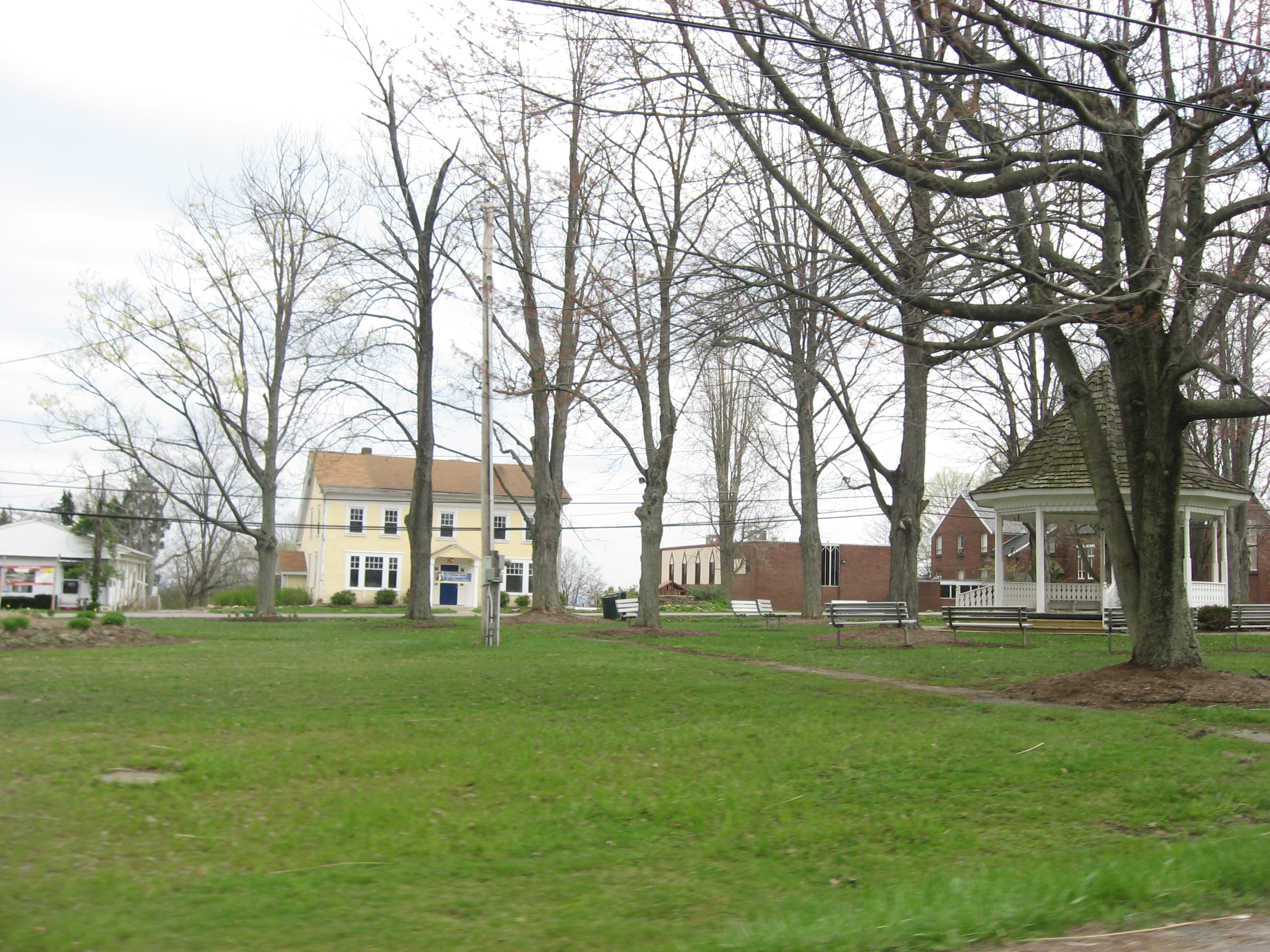
- The village green

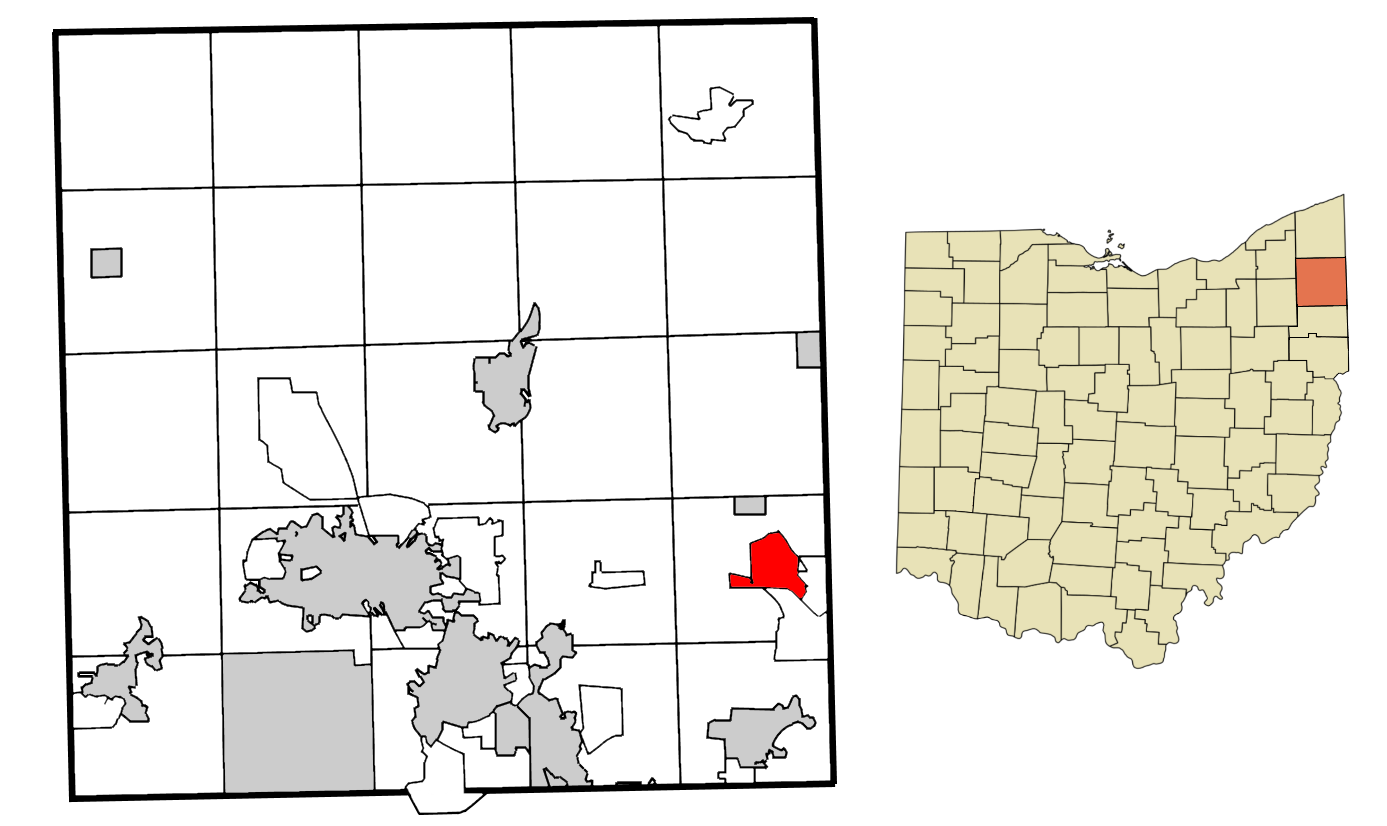
- Location of Brookfield Center in Trumbull County, Ohio.
- Coordinates: 41°14′34″N 80°33′16″W
- Country: United States
- State: Ohio
- County: Trumbull

Area
  - Total: 2.92 sq mi (7.56 km^{2})
  - Land: 2.92 sq mi (7.56 km^{2})
  - Water: 0 sq mi (0.00 km^{2})
- Elevation: 1,047 ft (319 m)

Population (2020)
  - Total: 1,141
  - Density: 390.7/sq mi (150.84/km^{2})
- Time zone: UTC-5 (Eastern (EST))
  - Summer (DST): UTC-4 (EDT)
- ZIP code: 44403
- Area codes: 330, 234
- FIPS code: 39-09200
- GNIS feature ID: 2393351
- Website: https://www.brookfieldtwp.org/

Brookfield Center, also referred to as simply Brookfield, is an unincorporated community and census-designated place in central Brookfield Township, Trumbull County, Ohio, United States. The population was 1,141 at the 2020 census. It is part of the Youngstown–Warren metropolitan area.

== History ==
Brookfield Center was platted in 1806, with land for the central green set aside.

== Geography ==
According to the United States Census Bureau, the CDP has a total area of 7.4 km^{2} (2.9 sq mi), all land.

== Demographics ==
Historical population
Census	Pop.	Note	%±
2010	1,207		—
2020	1,141		−5.5%
U.S. Decennial Census

As of the 2010 United States census, there were 1,207 people living in 581 households in the CDP. The population density was 163.1 people /km^{2} (422 people/mi^{2}). There were 581 housing units at an average density of 78.5 units /km^{2} (203 units/mi^{2}). The racial makeup of the CDP was 98.8% White, 0.6% African American, 0.2% Native American, 0.1% from some other race, and 0.3% from two or more races.

There were 543 households, of which 20.4% had children under 18 living with them, 54.5% were married couples living together, 7.9% had a female householder with no husband present, and 33.9% were non-families. 29.4% of all households were made up of individuals living alone, and 13.9% had someone living alone who was 65 years of age or older. The average household size was 2.245 and the average family size was 2.74.

In the CDP the population was spread out, with 17.3% under the age of 20, 9.6% from 20 to 29, 8.6% from 30 to 39, 14.5% from 40 to 49, 17.4% from 50 to 59, 15.8% from 60 to 69, 9.0% from 70 to 79, and 7.8% who were over 80 years old. The median age was 50 years. For every 100 females there were 97.5 males. For every 100 females age 18 and over, there were 93.2 males.

The mean household income for 2014 in the CDP was $65,021. The median earnings for male full-time, year-round workers was $47,417 versus $24,514 for females. The per capita income for the CDP was $25,310. About 3.9% of the population was below the poverty line, including 4.3% of those under age 18 and 6.2% of those age 65 or over.

== Education ==
Brookfield Center is served by the Brookfield Local Schools district. The current schools serving Brookfield Center include:

- Brookfield Elementary/Middle School – grades K-4
- Brookfield Middle School – grades 5–8
- Brookfield High School – grades 9–12
