= Yankee Lake, Ohio =

- Village
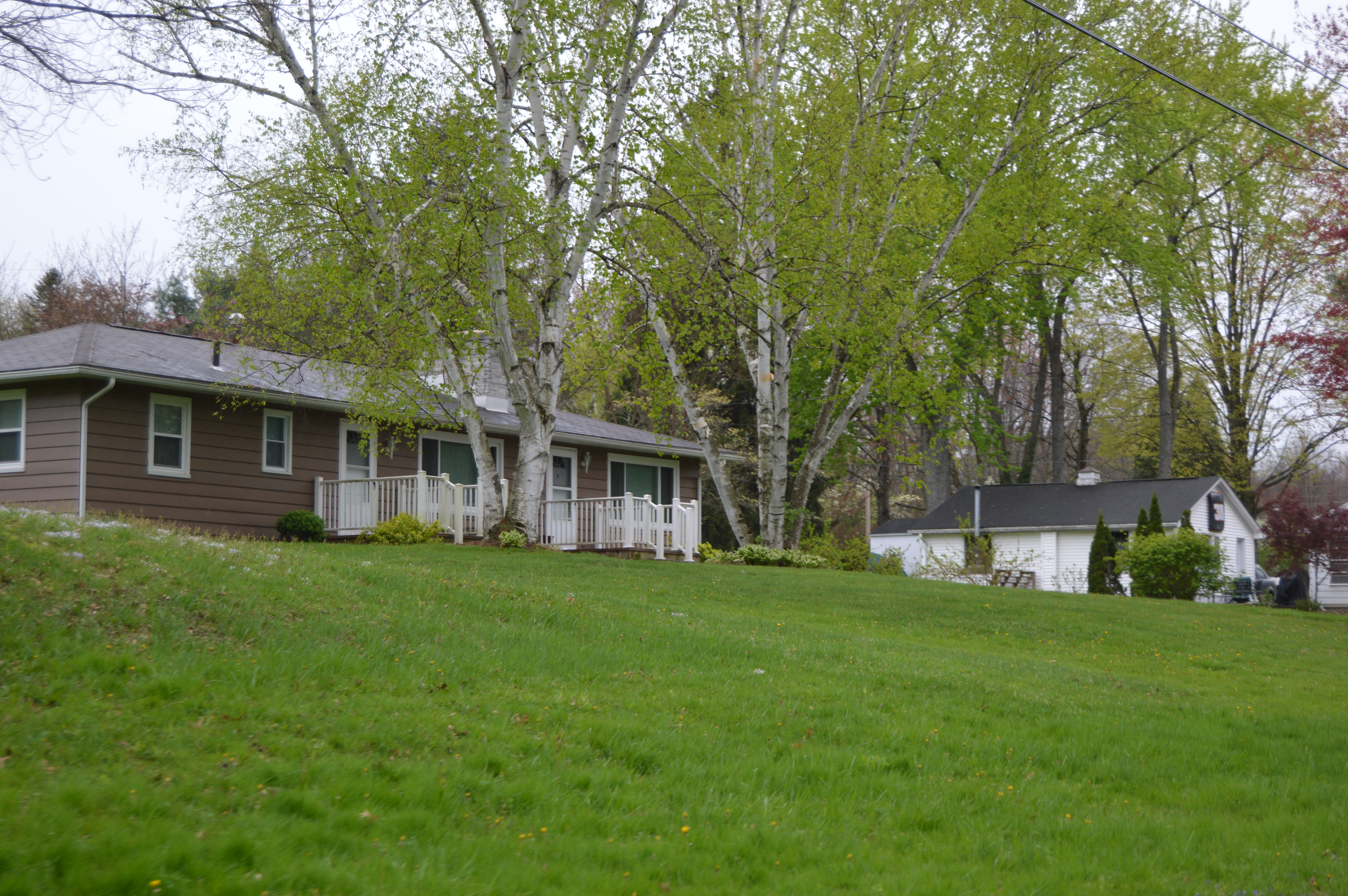
- Brockway Avenue

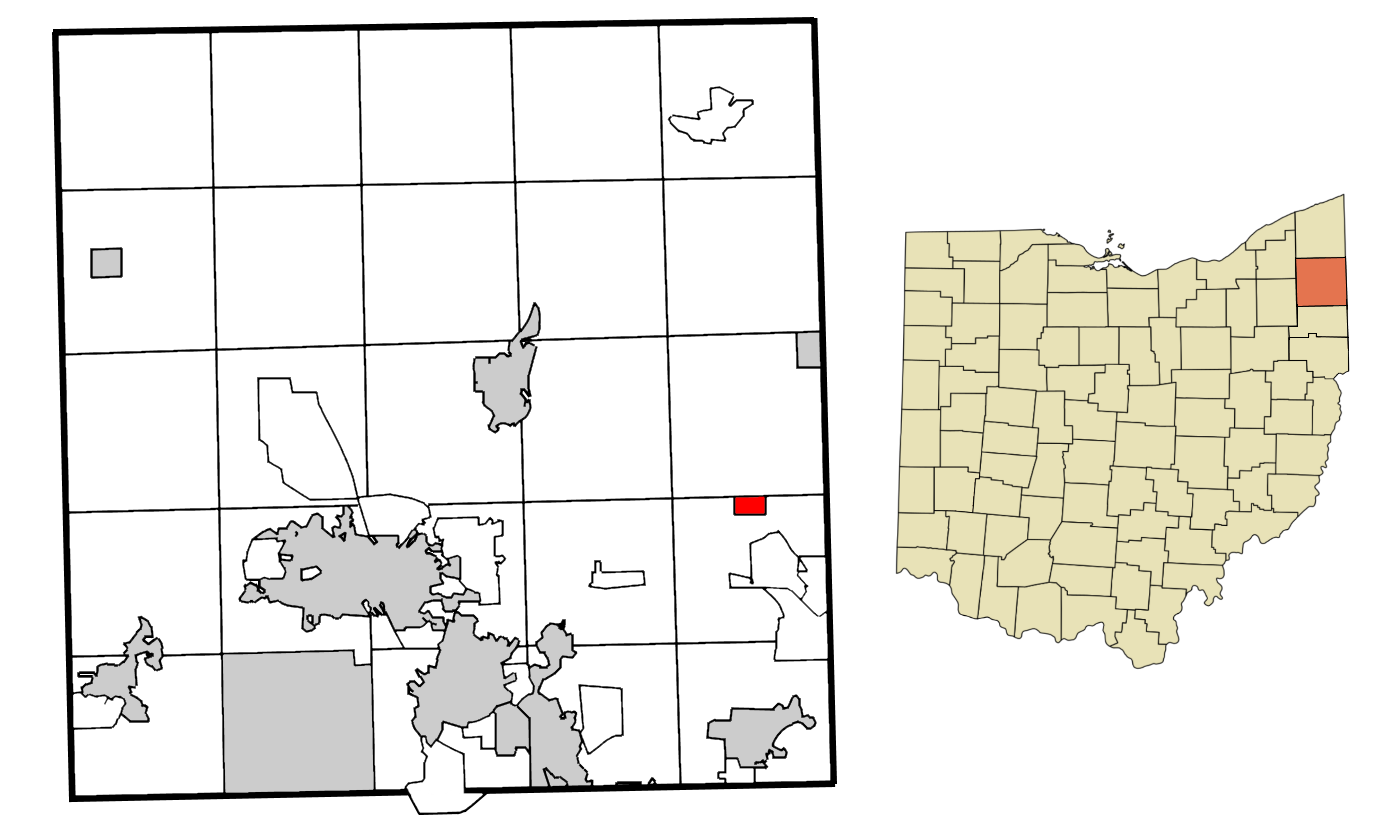
- Location of Yankee Lake in Trumbull County, Ohio.
- Coordinates: 41°16′06″N 80°34′04″W
- Country: United States
- State: Ohio
- County: Trumbull
- Township: Brookfield

Area
  - Total: 0.56 sq mi (1.46 km^{2})
  - Land: 0.56 sq mi (1.46 km^{2})
  - Water: 0 sq mi (0.00 km^{2})
- Elevation: 984 ft (300 m)

Population (2020)
  - Total: 75
  - Density: 133.2/sq mi (51.42/km^{2})
- Time zone: UTC-5 (Eastern (EST))
  - Summer (DST): UTC-4 (EDT)
- ZIP code: 44403
- Area codes: 330, 234
- FIPS code: 39-86856
- GNIS feature ID: 2399750

Yankee Lake is a village in eastern Trumbull County, Ohio, United States, located along Yankee Run. The population was 75 at the 2020 census. It is part of the Youngstown–Warren metropolitan area. The community is served by the Brookfield, Ohio post office.

== History ==
The village of Yankee Lake takes its name from a former man-made lake located along Yankee Run. First known as Lingamore Lake, it was renamed to match the name of the creek which was dammed to create it. Ernest Houston Stewart and John Jurko purchased land around the creek and opened a dance hall in 1928. It became a regular stop for acts during the Big Band era including Glenn Miller, Tommy Dorsey, Artie Shaw, Benny Goodman, Cab Calloway, Count Basie, and Duke Ellington. Famous gangsters of the era like John Dillinger may have even visited the ballroom. Although the popular swimming lake was drained in 1979, Yankee Lake has been reinvented to host motocross races, a successful seafood buffet, classic rock concerts and a banquet hall. Most recently it has become a venue for bike nights and truck nights.

== Geography ==
According to the United States Census Bureau, the village has a total area of 0.51 square miles (1.32 km^{2}), all land.

== Demographics ==
Historical population
Census	Pop.	Note	%±
1950	53		—
1960	42		−20.8%
1970	43		2.4%
1980	99		130.2%
1990	88		−11.1%
2000	99		12.5%
2010	79		−20.2%
2020	75		−5.1%
U.S. Decennial Census

=== 2010 census ===
As of the census of 2010, there were 79 people, 31 households, and 25 families living in the village. The population density was 154.9 inhabitants per square mile (59.8/km^{2}). There were 39 housing units at an average density of 76.5 per square mile (29.5/km^{2}). The racial makeup of the village was 98.7% White and 1.3% from other races. Hispanic or Latino of any race were 1.3% of the population.

There were 31 households, of which 25.8% had children under the age of 18 living with them, 74.2% were married couples living together, 6.5% had a male householder with no wife present, and 19.4% were non-families. 19.4% of all households were made up of individuals, and 3.2% had someone living alone who was 65 years of age or older. The average household size was 2.55 and the average family size was 2.84.

The median age in the village was 50.3 years. 15.2% of residents were under the age of 18; 5.1% were between the ages of 18 and 24; 24.1% were from 25 to 44; 38% were from 45 to 64; and 17.7% were 65 years of age or older. The gender makeup of the village was 46.8% male and 53.2% female.

=== 2000 census ===
As of the census of 2000, there were 99 people, 40 households, and 31 families living in the village. The population density was 180.4 inhabitants per square mile (69.7/km^{2}). There were 41 housing units at an average density of 74.7 per square mile (28.8/km^{2}). The racial makeup of the village was 100.00% White.

There were 40 households, out of which 30.0% had children under the age of 18 living with them, 70.0% were married couples living together, 2.5% had a female householder with no husband present, and 22.5% were non-families. 22.5% of all households were made up of individuals, and 5.0% had someone living alone who was 65 years of age or older. The average household size was 2.48 and the average family size was 2.90.

In the village, the population was spread out, with 21.2% under the age of 18, 3.0% from 18 to 24, 29.3% from 25 to 44, 32.3% from 45 to 64, and 14.1% who were 65 years of age or older. The median age was 44 years. For every 100 females there were 120.0 males. For every 100 females age 18 and over, there were 129.4 males.

The median income for a household in the village was $45,000, and the median income for a family was $50,000. Males had a median income of $43,125 versus $27,083 for females. The per capita income for the village was $21,340. There were 7.1% of families and 6.7% of the population living below the poverty line, including 11.1% of under eighteens and none of those over 64.
