= Brookfield Township, Trumbull County, Ohio =

Township in Ohio, US

- Township
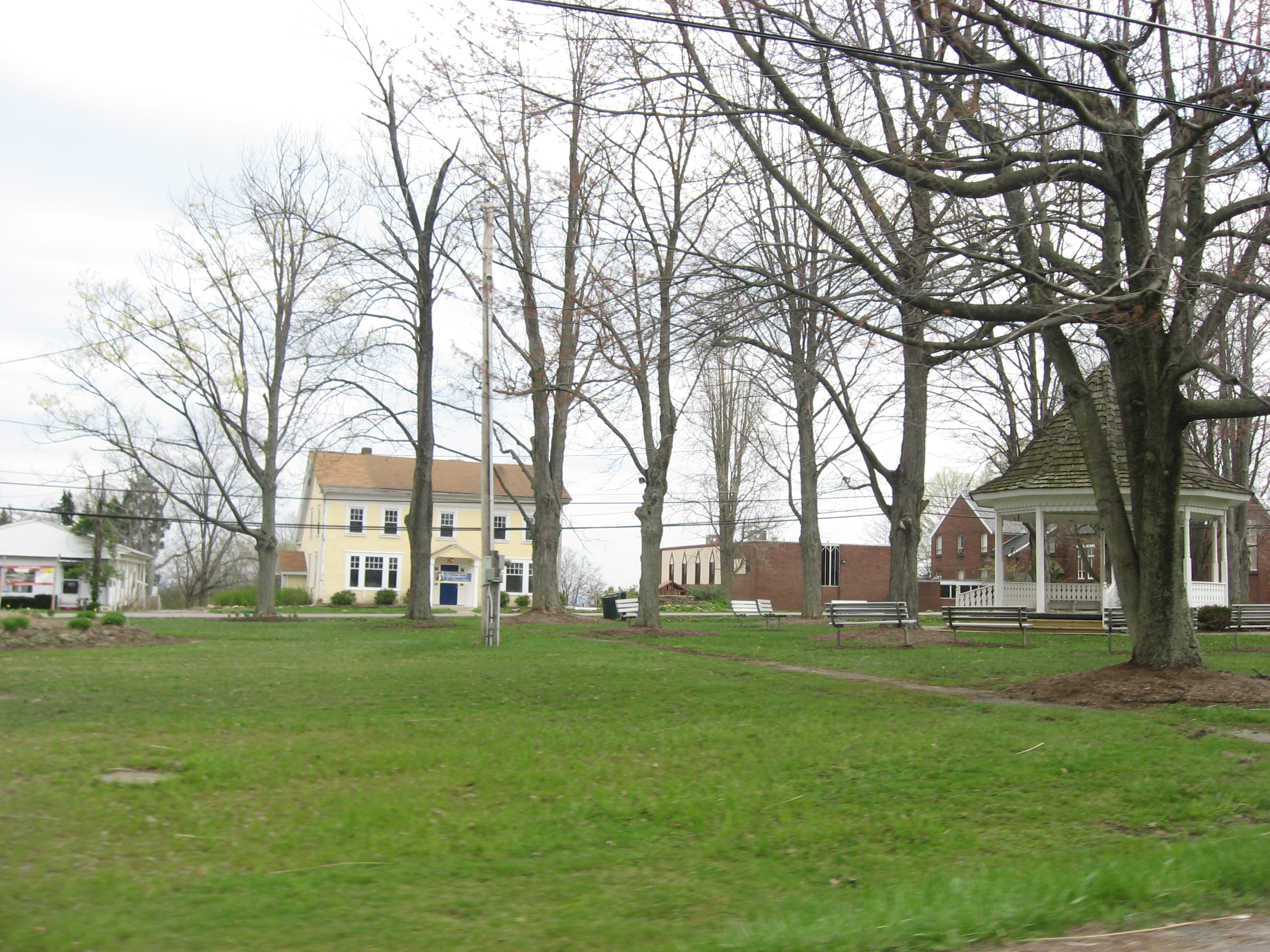
- The village green at Brookfield Center

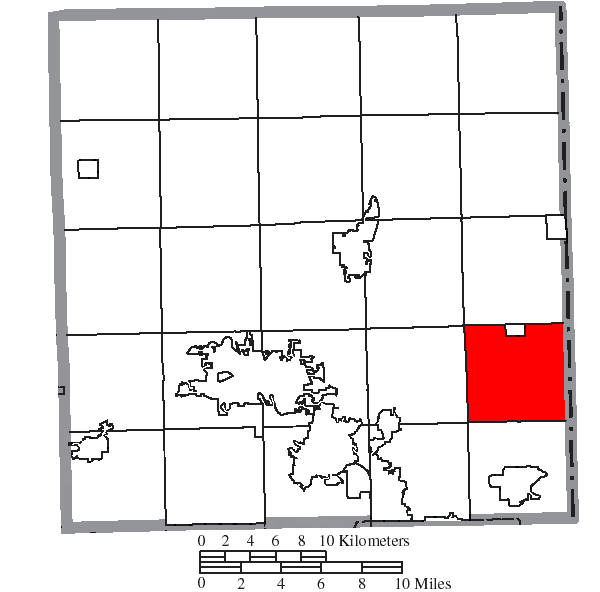
- Location of Brookfield Township in Trumbull County
- Coordinates: 41°14′0″N 80°33′7″W
- Country: United States
- State: Ohio
- County: Trumbull

Area
  - Total: 24.7 sq mi (63.9 km^{2})
  - Land: 24.6 sq mi (63.7 km^{2})
  - Water: 0.077 sq mi (0.2 km^{2})
- Elevation: 1,063 ft (324 m)

Population (2020)
  - Total: 8,447
  - Density: 343/sq mi (132.6/km^{2})
- Time zone: UTC-5 (Eastern (EST))
  - Summer (DST): UTC-4 (EDT)
- ZIP code: 44403
- Area codes: 330, 234
- FIPS code: 39-09190
- GNIS feature ID: 1087026
- Website: Township website

Brookfield Township is one of the twenty-four townships of Trumbull County, Ohio, United States. The 2020 census found 8,447 people in the township.

== Geography ==
Located in the Southeastern part of the county, it borders the following townships and city:

- Hartford Township - north
- South Pymatuning Township, Mercer County, Pennsylvania - northeast
- Hubbard Township - south
- Liberty Township - southwest corner
- Sharon, Pennsylvania - east
- Vienna Township - west
- Fowler Township - northwest corner

The village of Yankee Lake is located in northern Brookfield Township, along with three census-designated places:

- Brookfield Center, in the center
- Part of Masury, in the southeast
- West Hill, in the east

== Name and history ==
Statewide, the only other Brookfield Township is located in Noble County.

== Government ==
The township is governed by a three-member board of trustees, who are elected in November of odd-numbered years to a four-year term beginning on the following January 1. Two are elected in the year after the presidential election and one is elected in the year before it. There is also an elected township fiscal officer, who serves a four-year term beginning on April 1 of the year after the election, which is held in November of the year before the presidential election. Vacancies in the fiscal officership or on the board of trustees are filled by the remaining trustees.

Brookfield has a public library, a branch of the Warren-Trumbull County Public Library.

== Education ==
Students within Brookfield Township attend Brookfield High School and Brookfield Local School District. High school students are permitted to attend Trumbull Career and Technical Center as an alternative to their home school.

== Media ==
=== Television ===
The township is served by WKBN-TV (CBS), WFMJ-TV (NBC), WYTV (ABC), WYFX-LD (Fox) and WBCB (CW), all broadcast from nearby Youngstown, OH.

=== Radio ===
The township is served by several AM radio stations, such as WLOA (1470 AM) (Farrell, PA), WPIC (790 AM) (Sharon, PA), WKBN (570 AM) (Youngstown, OH), and by several FM radio stations such as WYFM/"Y-103" (102.9 FM) (Yankee Lake, OH), WLLF/"The River" (96.7 FM) (Mercer, PA), WYLE/"Willie 95.1" (95.1 FM) (Grove City, PA), WMXY/"Mix 98.9" (98.9 FM) (Youngstown, OH) and WWIZ/"Z-104" (West Middlesex, PA), because of Brookfield's unique position along the Pennsylvania/Ohio border..

=== Print ===
Brookfield Township is served by News on the Green, a monthly publication that focuses Brookfield, Yankee Lake, and Masury, The Herald (Sharon, PA), The Vindicator (Youngstown, OH), and the Tribune Chronicle (Youngstown, OH).
