= Southington Local School District =

School district in Ohio, United States

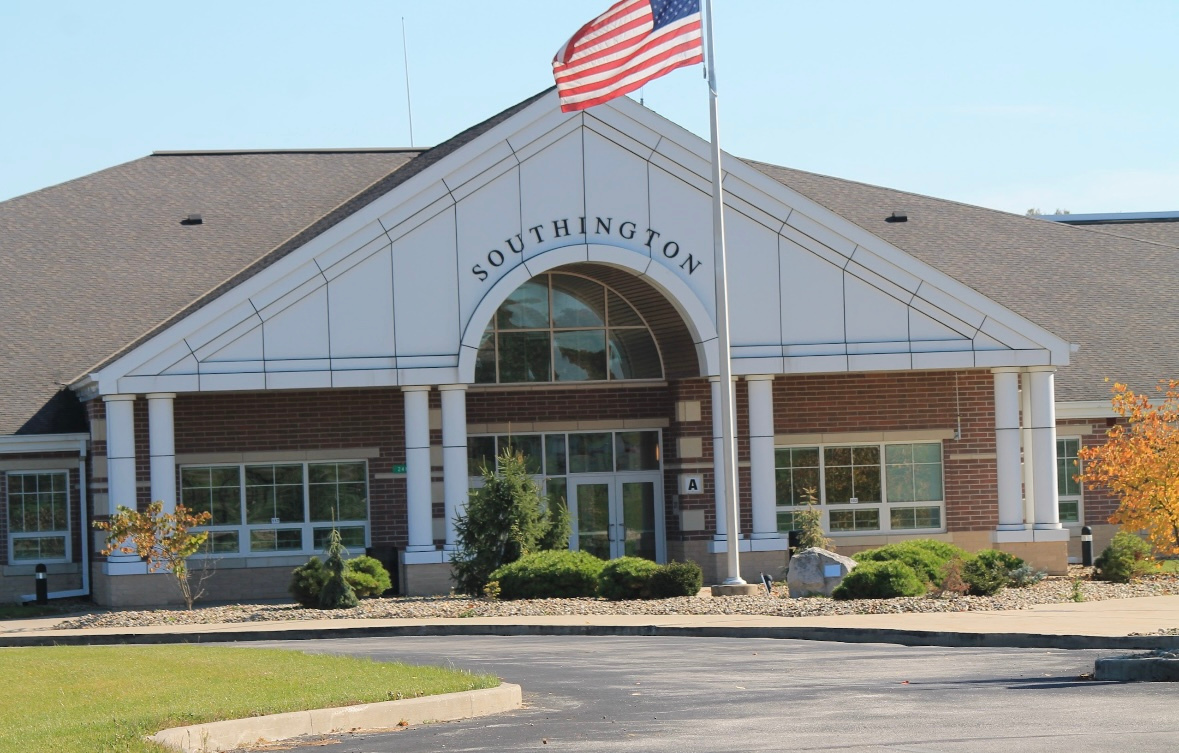
- Southington Local School District PK-12 Building

Address
- 2482 State Route 534 Southington, Ohio, 44470; United States
- Coordinates: 41°17′03″N 80°57′34″W

District information
- Type: Public
- Grades: PK–12
- Established: 1907
- Superintendent: Troy Beall
- NCES District ID: 3905023

Students and staff
- Enrollment: 437 (2024–25)
- Faculty: 28.68 (on an FTE basis)
- Student–teacher ratio: 15.24

Other information
- Website: www.southingtonlocal.org

The Southington Local School District is a school district located in Southington Township in Trumbull County, Ohio, United States. The school district serves a high school, middle school, elementary school and preschool within their PK-12 campus located at 2482 State Route 534, Southington, Ohio 44470.

== History ==
The Southington Local School District was formed in 1907. following the consolidation of several smaller schools within the township. Newton Chalker, an attorney who was born in Southington in 1842, agreed to pay for the construction of the Chalker High School building as long as the town agreed to pay the construction of the elementary school building. The original Chalker High School and Southington Elementary School were completed in 1907, with Chalker High School costing $20,000 to build and Southington Elementary School $6,000. The high school was constructed in the Neoclassical Revival architectural style, including fluted columns and a pedimented gable. The building was listed on the National Register of Historic Places on February 4, 2011.

In 2011, Southington Local Schools built their new PK-12 campus on donated land from Mr. and Mrs. Donaldson, both residents of Southington located at Ohio State Route 534.

== Schools ==
=== High school ===
- Chalker High School

=== Middle school ===
- Southington Middle School

=== Elementary school ===
- Southington Elementary School

=== Preschool ===
- Southington Preschool

== District enrollment figures (K-12) ==
1980	1985	1990	1995	2000	2005	2010	2015	2020	2025
794	756	705	678	650	676	660	525	495	437

== Notable alumni ==
- Chad Petty – former professional baseball player in the Major League Baseball (MLB)
- Rick Badanjek – former professional football player in the National Football League (NFL)
