= Southington Township, Trumbull County, Ohio =

Township in Ohio, US

Southington Township
- Township
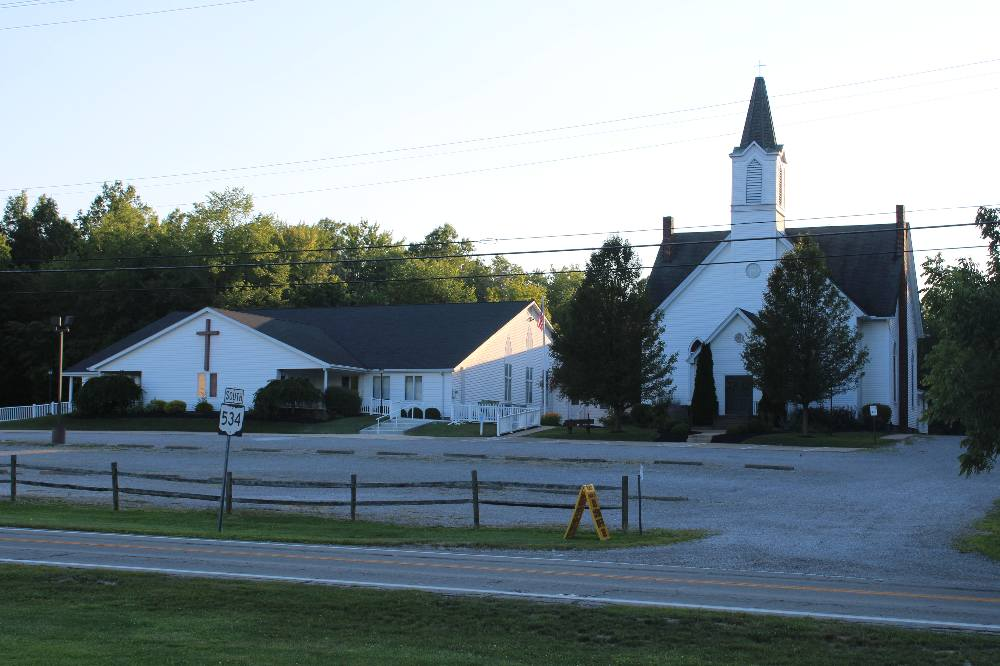
- Southington Christian Church on ST RT 305 in 2021

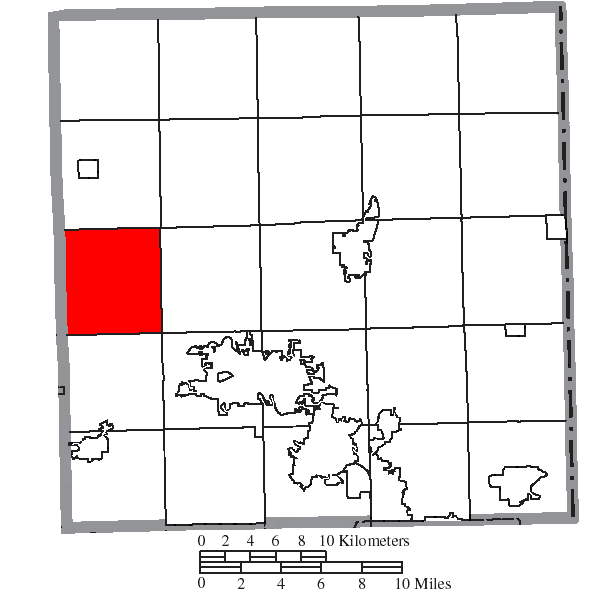
- Location of Southington Township in Trumbull County
- Coordinates: 41°18′22″N 80°56′48″W
- Country: United States
- State: Ohio
- County: Trumbull

Area
  - Total: 26.0 sq mi (67.3 km^{2})
  - Land: 25.9 sq mi (67.2 km^{2})
  - Water: 0.039 sq mi (0.1 km^{2})
- Elevation: 909 ft (277 m)

Population (2020)
  - Total: 3,731
  - Density: 144/sq mi (55.5/km^{2})
- Time zone: UTC-5 (Eastern (EST))
  - Summer (DST): UTC-4 (EDT)
- ZIP code: 44470
- Area codes: 234/330
- FIPS code: 39-73397
- GNIS feature ID: 1087043
- Website: Township website

Southington Township is one of the twenty-four townships of Trumbull County, Ohio, United States. The 2020 census found 3,731 people in the township.

== Geography ==
Located in the western part of the county, it borders the following townships:

- Farmington Township - north
- Bristol Township - northeast corner
- Champion Township - east
- Warren Township - southeast corner
- Braceville Township - south
- Windham Township, Portage County - southwest corner
- Nelson Township, Portage County - west
- Parkman Township, Geauga County - northwest corner

No municipalities are located in Southington Township, although the unincorporated community of Southington lies at the center of the township.

Notable highways in Southington Township include U.S. Route 422 and State Routes 534 and 305.

== Government ==
The township is governed by a three-member board of trustees, who are elected in November of odd-numbered years to a four-year term beginning on the following January 1. Two are elected in the year after the presidential election and one is elected in the year before it. There is also an elected township fiscal officer, who serves a four-year term beginning on April 1 of the year after the election, which is held in November of the year before the presidential election. Vacancies in the fiscal officer ship or on the board of trustees are filled by the remaining trustees.

== Education ==
Students in Southington attend Southington Local Schools. It comprises Southington Elementary School, Southington Middle School, and Chalker High School. The elementary, middle, and high schools are all on the same campus. High school students are permitted to attend Trumbull Career and Technical Center as an alternative to their home school.

The vacant Southington Township School, which was Southington Townships original High School and Elementary School from 1907 until 2011, sits on State Route 305 and is a part of the National Register of Historic Places.

== Public Services ==
Southington Township has a volunteer fire department and are under the Trumbull County Sheriff's Department. The township also has two churches, Delightful Church, located on State Route 422 and Southington Christian Church located on State Route 305.

== Notable residents ==
- Chad Petty, former professional baseball player in the Major League Baseball (MLB)
- Rick Badanjek, former professional football player in the National Football League (NFL)
- Mike Tyson, former professional boxer
