= Bristol Township, Trumbull County, Ohio =

Township in Ohio, US

- Township
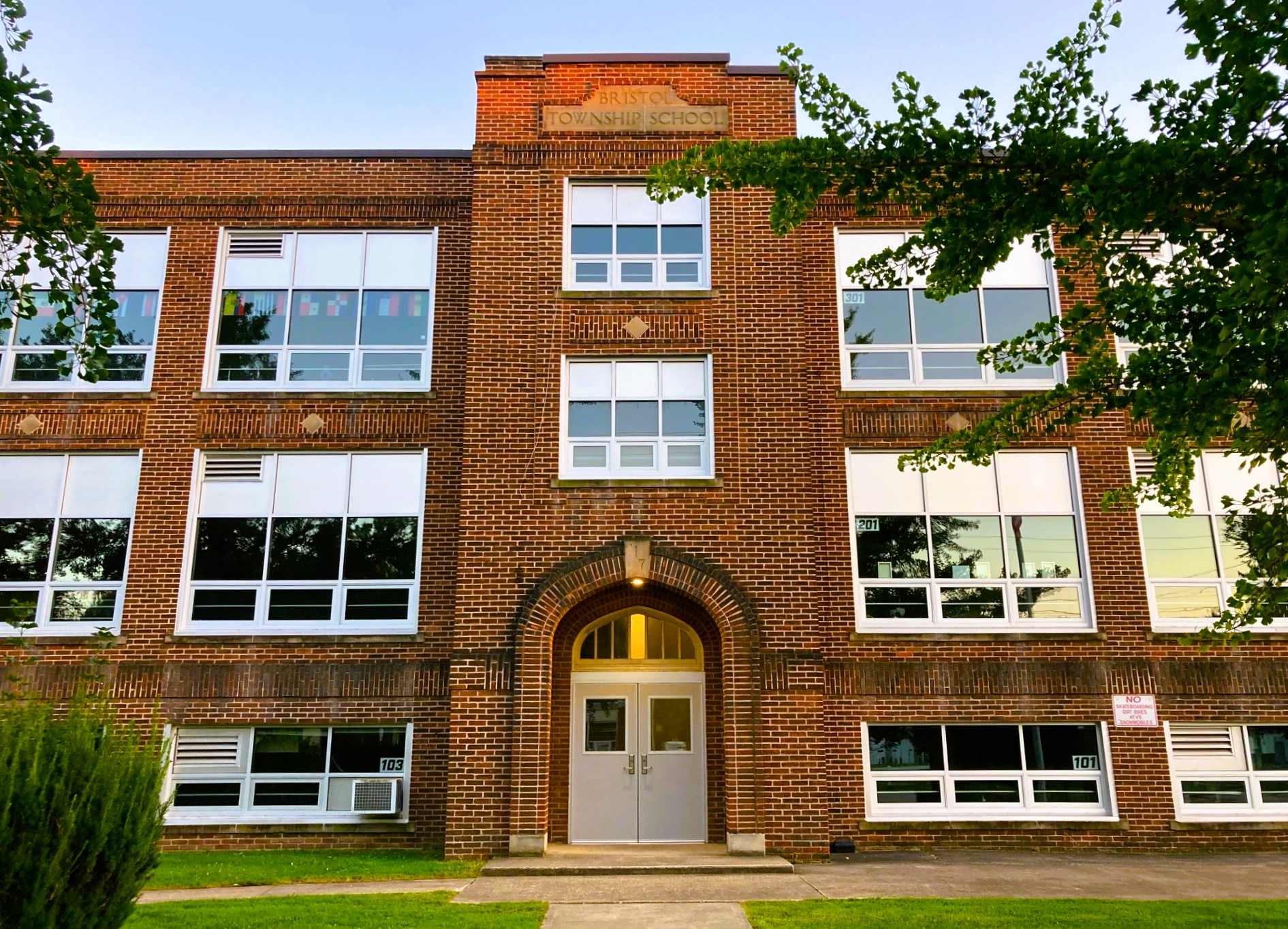
- Bristol Middle School

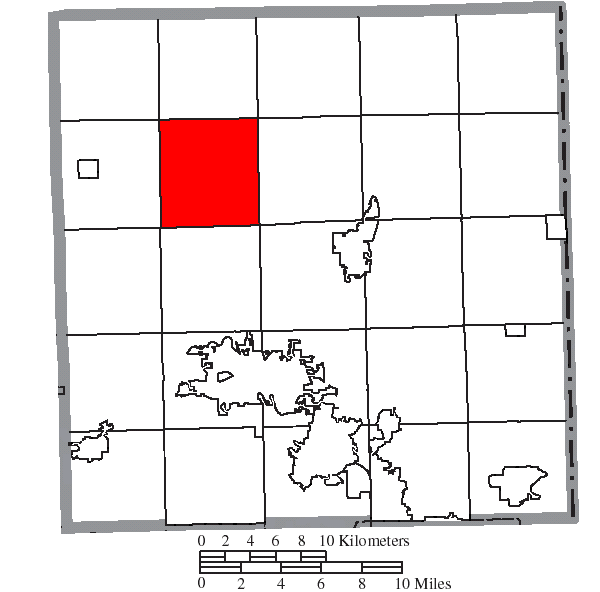
- Location of Bristol Township in Trumbull County
- Coordinates: 41°22′58″N 80°51′44″W
- Country: United States
- State: Ohio
- County: Trumbull

Area
  - Total: 26.0 sq mi (67.3 km^{2})
  - Land: 26.0 sq mi (67.3 km^{2})
  - Water: 0 sq mi (0.0 km^{2})
- Elevation: 909 ft (277 m)

Population (2020)
  - Total: 2,704
  - Density: 104/sq mi (40.2/km^{2})
- Time zone: UTC-5 (Eastern (EST))
  - Summer (DST): UTC-4 (EDT)
- FIPS code: 39-08938
- GNIS feature ID: 1087025

Bristol Township is one of the twenty-four townships of Trumbull County, Ohio, United States. The 2020 census found 2,704 people in the township.

== Geography ==
Located in the northwestern part of the county, it borders the following townships:

- Bloomfield Township – north
- Greene Township – northeast corner
- Mecca Township – east
- Bazetta Township – southeast corner
- Champion Township – south
- Southington Township – southwest corner
- Farmington Township – west
- Mesopotamia Township – northwest corner

No municipalities are located in Bristol Township, although the unincorporated community of Bristolville lies at the center of the township.

== Name and history ==
Bristol Township was originally surveyed by Alfred Wolcott, who was from Bristol, Connecticut in the early 1800s, which he named the township after. Statewide, the only other Bristol Township is located in Morgan County.

== Government ==
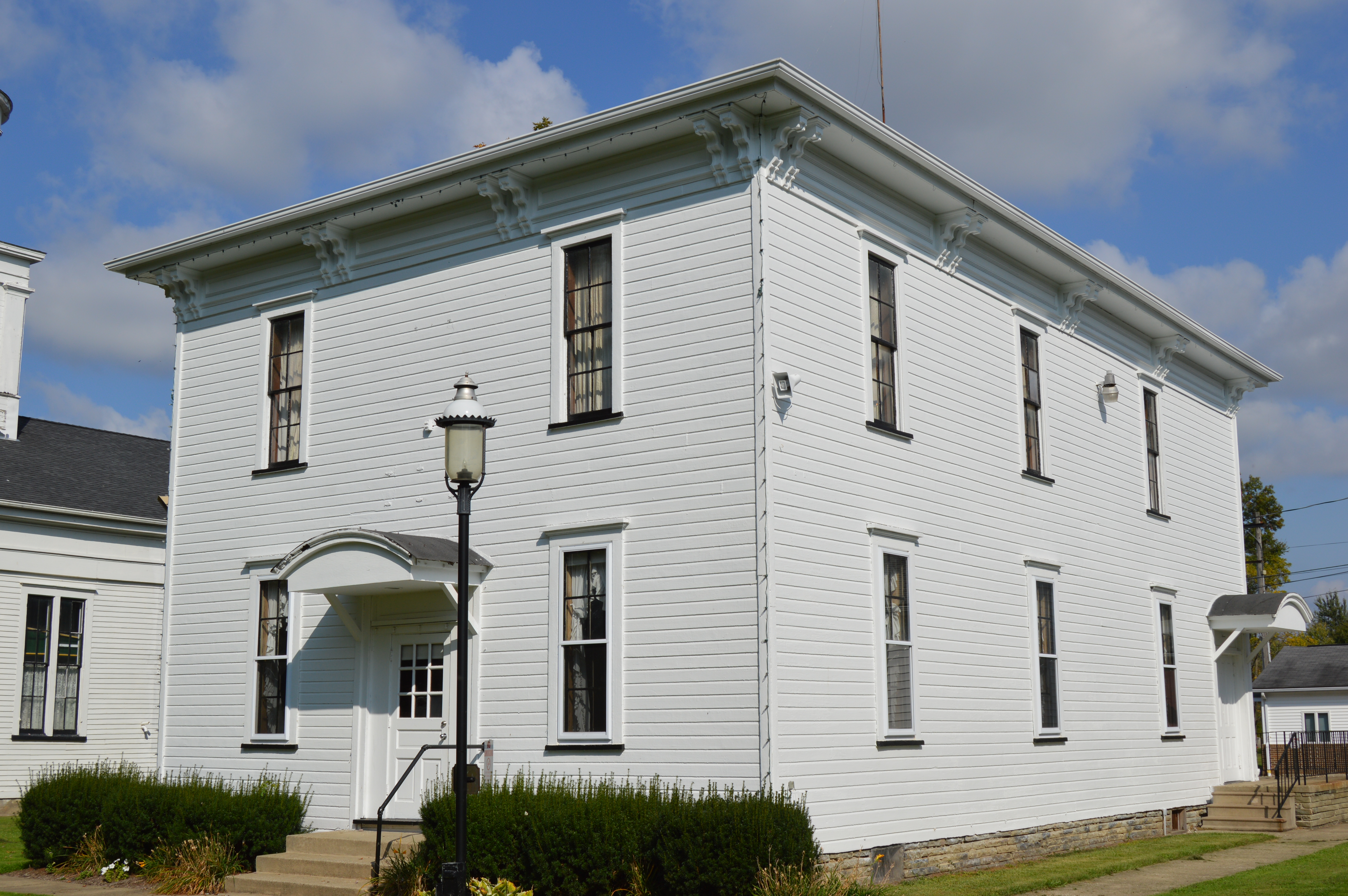
Bristol town hall at Bristolville

The township is governed by a three-member board of trustees, who are elected in November of odd-numbered years to a four-year term beginning on the following January 1. Two are elected in the year after the presidential election and one is elected in the year before it. There is also an elected township fiscal officer, who serves a four-year term beginning on April 1 of the year after the election, which is held in November of the year before the presidential election. Vacancies in the fiscal officer ship or on the board of trustees are filled by the remaining trustees.

== Education ==
Students in Bristol Township attend Bristol High School and the Bristol Local School District. High school students are permitted to attend Trumbull Career and Technical Center as an alternative to their home school.
