= Southington Township School =

- U.S. National Register of Historic Places
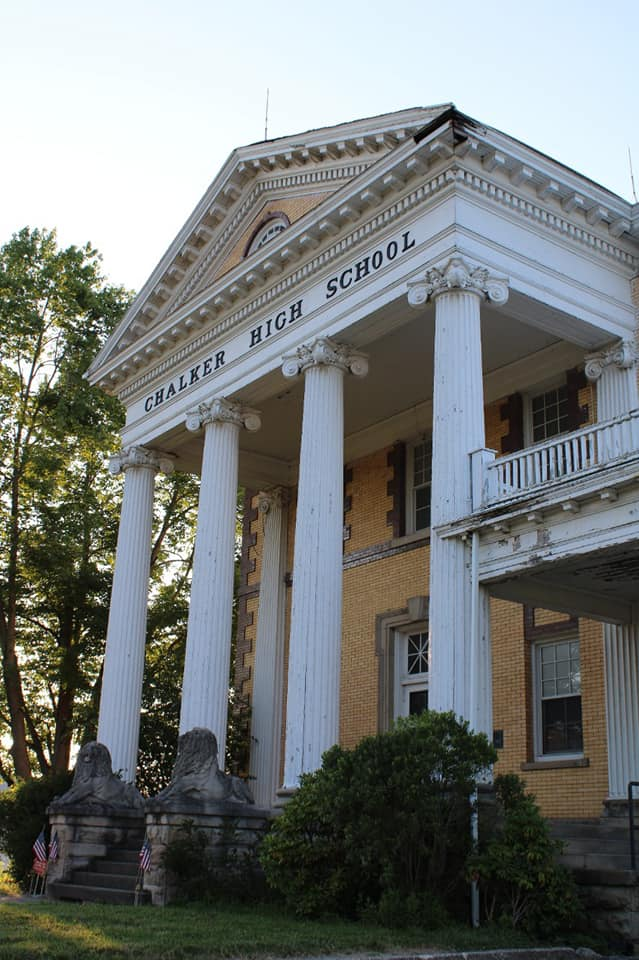
- Original Chalker High School in 2022

- Location within Ohio
- Location: OH 305, Southington, Ohio
- Coordinates: 41°18′32.4″N 80°57′28.8″W
- Area: Southington, Ohio
- Built: 1907
- NRHP reference No.: 10001214 (original); 12000464 (increase)

Significant dates
- Added to NRHP: February 4, 2011
- Boundary increase: August 1, 2012

Southington Township School is a historic district located in Southington Township, near Warren, Ohio, United States. The district includes the original Chalker High School and Southington Elementary School, both built in 1906 and completed in 1907. It also includes the Southington Civil War monument and park, located between the two school buildings, which was built in 1910. The district was originally listed in 2011 as Chalker High School and included the monument. In 2012, the district was expanded and renamed to include the adjacent elementary school after several additions and later modifications were removed.

== History ==
The district was created as a result of a donation from Newton Chalker, an attorney who was born in Southington in 1842. At the time, like most rural areas, Southington had a number of one room schoolhouses. During the late 19th and early 20th centuries, rural areas began to consolidate schoolhouses into a central school building. Southington residents had voted down a proposal to consolidate the schoolhouses in 1903. In September 1905 Chalker offered to fund a high school and library for the township if residents voted to approve consolidation and build a separate elementary school. Voters approved consolidation on October 10, 1905, and the original campus was started in mid-1906 and completed in August 1907, consisting of the Chalker High School building and a smaller elementary school. In 1910, Chalker funded construction of a Civil War monument and park in the area between the high school and elementary school.

The original Chalker High School building and the Civil War monument and park were listed on the National Register of Historic Places on February 4, 2011, as Chalker High School. The following year, the district was expanded and renamed to include the former elementary school after later additions and modifications to the building, which had prevented it from being listed, were removed from the site.

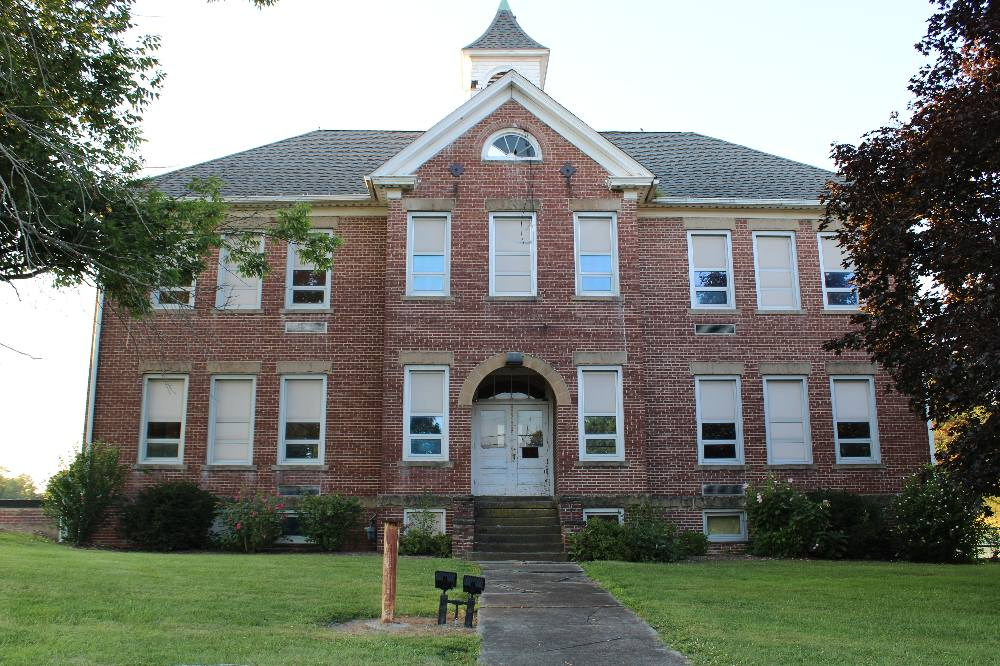
Southington Township School in 2022

== Architecture ==
The high school was constructed in the Neoclassical Revival architectural style, including fluted columns and a pedimented gable. It was designed by architect Alfred Dole and cost between $20,000 and $30,000 to construct and furnish in 1906. When it opened, the first floor included a meeting room for the school board, a room for the township library, and a classroom for the high school students, which totaled 48 in 1907. The second floor contained an auditorium with a stage that could accommodate around 400 people. Over time, the rooms were reconfigured and subdivided. The stage and auditorium were divided into classrooms in 1929 after a newer elementary school building opened that included a larger gymnasium and stage.

The Chalker building was dedicated August 22, 1907, and the dedication was reportedly attended by several thousand people even though Southington Township had a population of 750 people in 1900. At its opening, it was hailed by one writer as “one of the finest buildings in Trumbull County”, while another writer called it “one of the finest rural high school structures in Ohio.”

The original elementary school was built using a more modest Colonial Revival style and cost approximately $7,000 to build in 1906. After a new and larger elementary building opened in 1929, this building was unused for 10 years. It was put back into use after being renovated and remodeled as part of a Public Works Administration project in 1939. Later, an addition was built on the back of the 1907 building to connect it with the 1929 building, followed by later expansions completed in 1957, 1969, and 1980. The presence of these later additions caused the elementary school to be excluded from the original NRHP listing in 2011. They were removed later in 2011 and the district was expanded in 2012 to include the building.

== See also ==
- Southington, Ohio
- National Register of Historic Places listings in Trumbull County, Ohio
