= Braceville Township, Ohio =

Township in Ohio, US

- Township
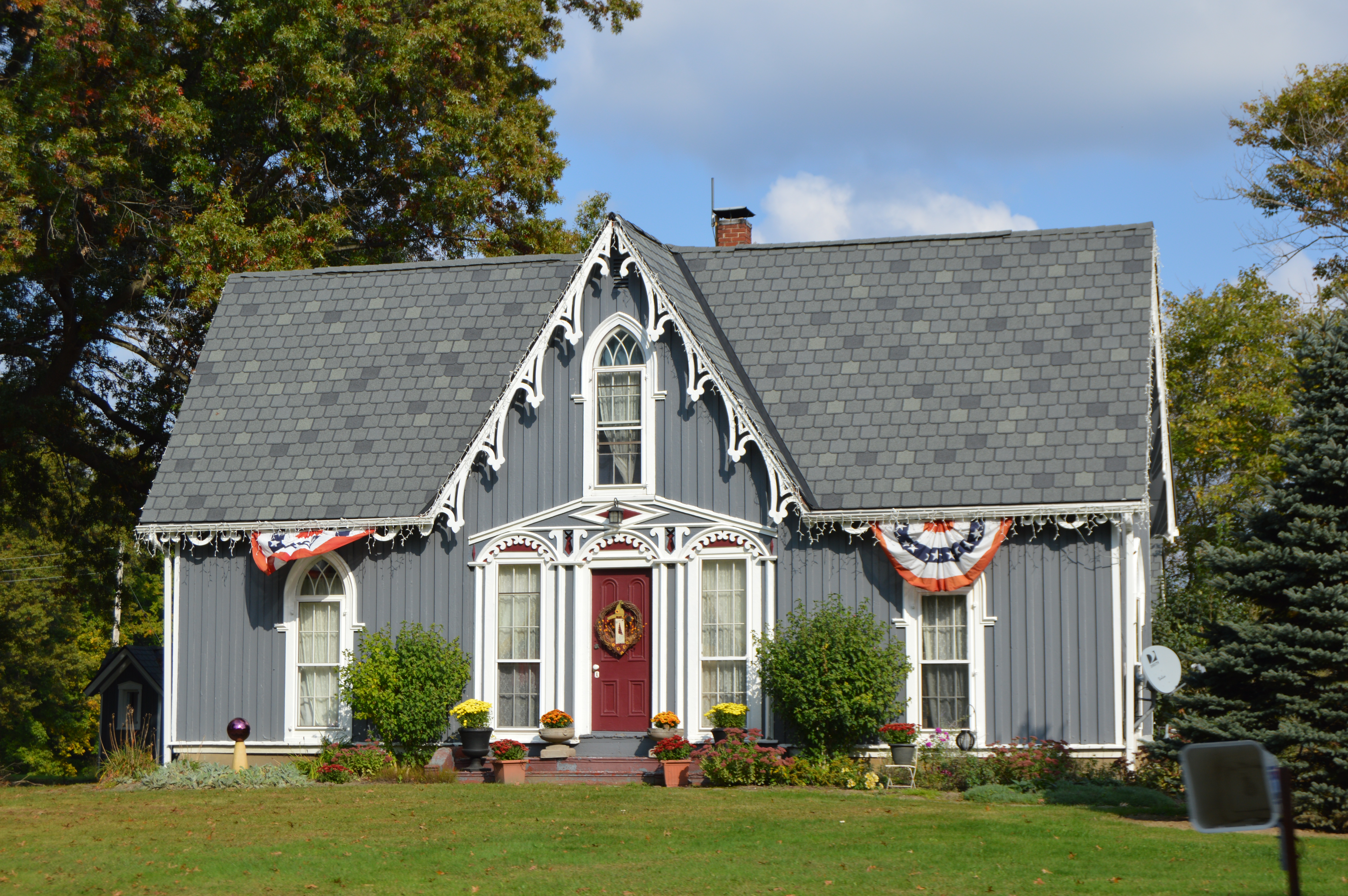
- The John Wesley Mason Gothic Cottage, a historic site in the township

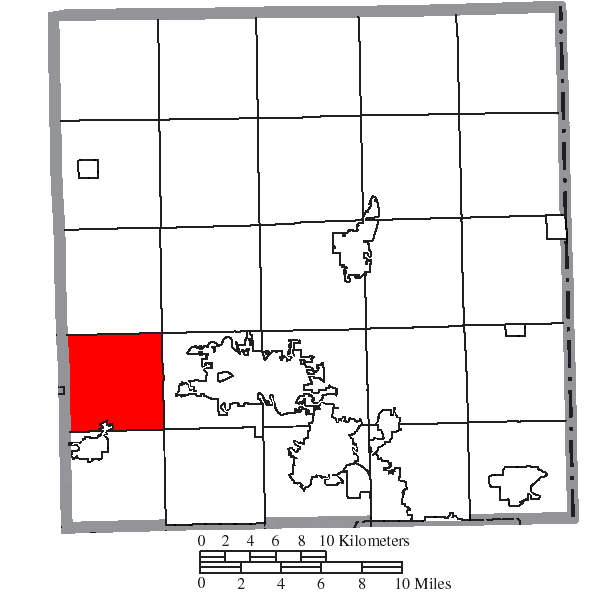
- Location of Braceville Township in Trumbull County
- Coordinates: 41°13′45″N 80°57′13″W
- Country: United States
- State: Ohio
- County: Trumbull

Area
  - Total: 23.3 sq mi (60.4 km^{2})
  - Land: 23.2 sq mi (60.1 km^{2})
  - Water: 0.15 sq mi (0.4 km^{2})
- Elevation: 899 ft (274 m)

Population (2020)
  - Total: 2,467
  - Density: 110/sq mi (41/km^{2})
- Time zone: UTC-5 (Eastern (EST))
  - Summer (DST): UTC-4 (EDT)
- ZIP code: 44444
- Area codes: 234/330
- FIPS code: 39-08056
- GNIS feature ID: 1087024

Braceville Township is one of the twenty-four townships of Trumbull County, Ohio, United States. The 2020 census found 2,467 people in the township.

== History ==
Braceville Township was established in the 1810s, and named after Jonathan Brace, a land agent. It is the only Braceville Township statewide.

Braceville Township was formed from the Connecticut Western Reserve.

== Geography ==
Located in the southwestern part of the county, it borders the following townships and village:

- Southington Township - north
- Champion Township - northeast corner
- Warren Township - east
- Lordstown - southeast corner
- Newton Township - south
- Paris Township, Portage County - southwest corner
- Windham Township, Portage County - west
- Nelson Township, Portage County - northwest corner

In 1990, the Turnpike Interchange Census-designated place [CDP] was located in Braceville Township; however, this ceased to be a CDP after the 1990 Census.

Braceville Township covers an area of 25 sq mi (65 km^{2}). The Ravenna Training and Logistics Site covers the southwest corner of the township.

=== Communities ===
- Braceville
- Center of the World
- Newton Falls
- Phalanx, aka Phalanx Mills

== Government ==
The township is governed by a three-member board of trustees, who are elected in November of odd-numbered years to a four-year term beginning on the following January 1. Two are elected in the year after the presidential election and one is elected in the year before it. There is also an elected township fiscal officer, who serves a four-year term beginning on April 1 of the year after the election, which is held in November of the year before the presidential election. Vacancies in the fiscal officership or on the board of trustees are filled by the remaining trustees.

== Public Services ==
Braceville Voulenteer Fire Department and Braceville Township Police Department.

== Education ==
Braceville Township students attend LaBrae High School and the LaBrae Local School District. High school students are permitted to attend Trumbull Career and Technical Center as an alternative to their home school.

== Notable people ==
- Boxer Earnie Shavers, former professional boxer.
- Ted Toles Jr., former professional baseball player in the Negro leagues.
- Emma Rood Tuttle, former author
