= Farmington Township, Trumbull County, Ohio =

Township in Ohio, US

- Township
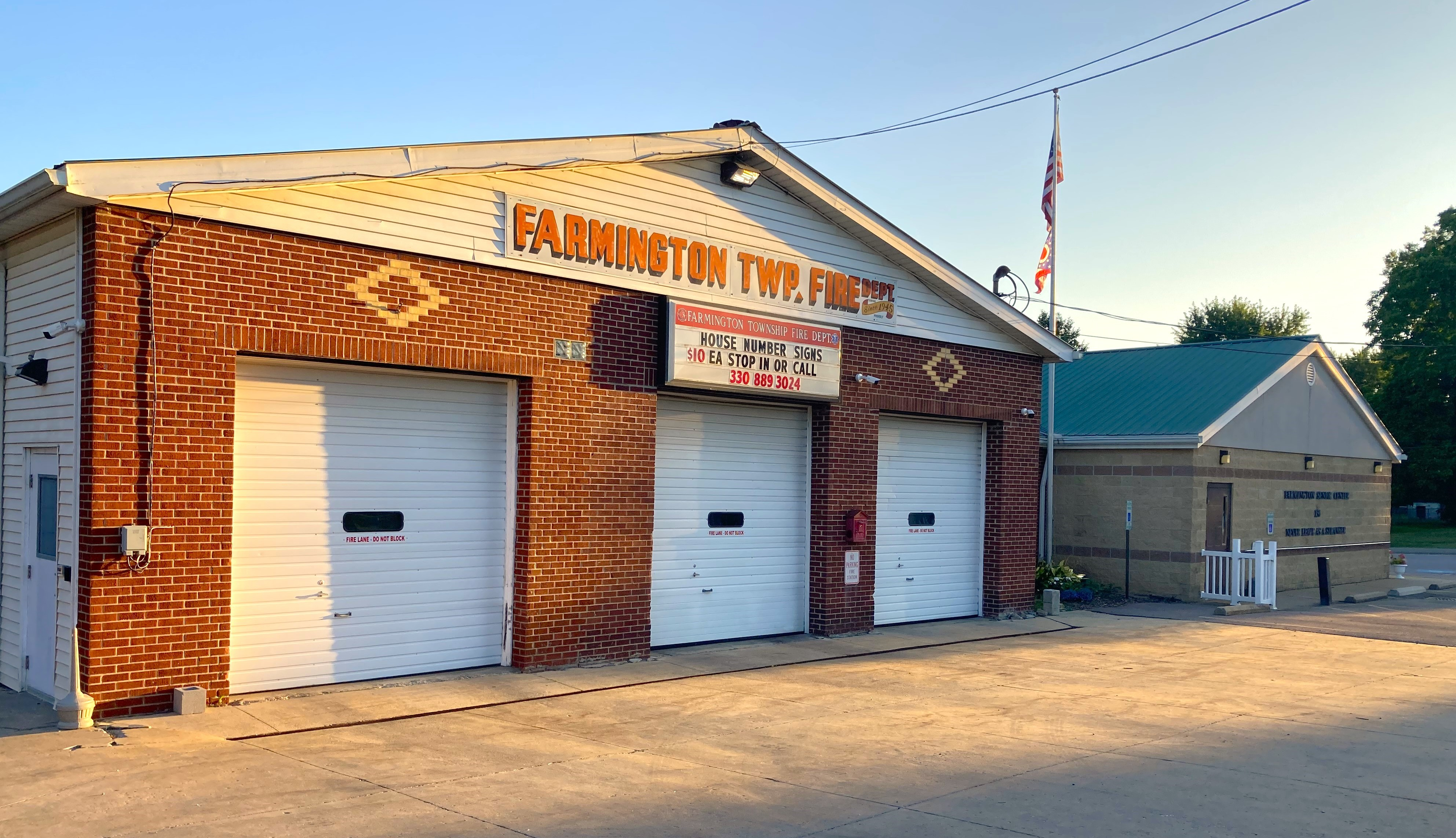

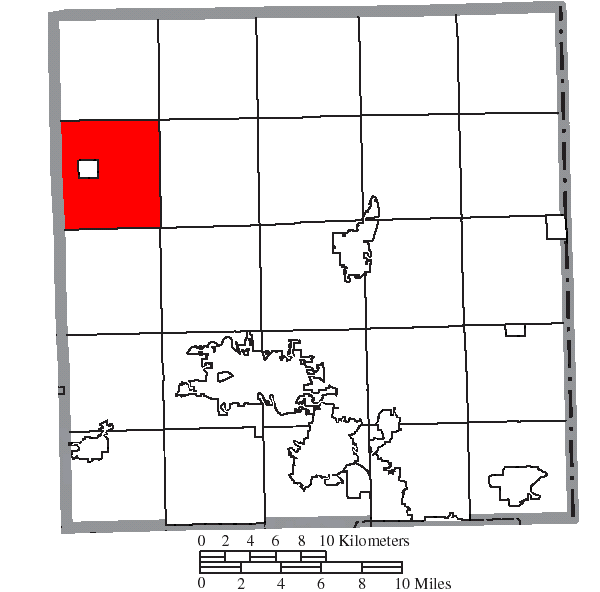
- Location of Farmington Township in Trumbull County
- Coordinates: 41°23′18″N 80°57′26″W
- Country: United States
- State: Ohio
- County: Trumbull

Area
  - Total: 27.5 sq mi (71.2 km^{2})
  - Land: 27.5 sq mi (71.1 km^{2})
  - Water: 0.039 sq mi (0.1 km^{2})
- Elevation: 850 ft (260 m)

Population (2020)
  - Total: 2,993
  - Density: 109/sq mi (42.1/km^{2})
- Time zone: UTC-5 (Eastern (EST))
  - Summer (DST): UTC-4 (EDT)
- FIPS code: 39-26684
- GNIS feature ID: 1087028

Historical population
Census	Pop.	Note	%±
1990	1,897		—
2000	2,353		24.0%
2010	2,728		15.9%
2020	2,993		9.7%
U.S. Census:

Farmington Township is one of the twenty-four townships of Trumbull County, Ohio, United States. The 2020 census recorded 2,993 people in the township.

== Geography ==
Located in the northwestern part of the county, it borders the following townships:

- Mesopotamia Township - north
- Bloomfield Township - northeast corner
- Bristol Township - east
- Champion Township - southeast corner
- Southington Township - south
- Nelson Township, Portage County - southwest corner
- Parkman Township, Geauga County - west
- Middlefield Township, Geauga County - northwest corner

The village of West Farmington is located in northwestern Farmington Township.

== Name and history ==
It is the only Farmington Township statewide, though often gets confused for the city of Farmington in the southeastern part of the state.

The first residents were three families- the Wolcotts, Curtis' and Harts. The exact locations of their homesteads is lost, however one history of the region gives their former homes as near the McKay and Loveland farms. A Library of Congress map shows several McKay residences concentrated around Playland Lake, close to the Southington border and a single tract of land under the name Loveland existed southwest of West Farmington Village, on a former connecting road between Ensign and Curtis-Middlefield, which no longer exists.

The major swamp in the east of the town, surrounding the Grand River, was originally called the Black Ash Swamp by early Bristol and Bloomfield residents. It provided major industry for a sawmill early on. The town once boasted a school, hotel, community College, opera house and restaurant- all of which are now closed, were destroyed, or otherwise were torn down. The school merged with the neighboring Bristolville School district in the 1980s, before closing in the early 2000s.

== Education ==
Students within Farmington Township attend Bristol High School and the Bristol Local Schools District. High school students are permitted to attend Trumbull Career and Technical Center as an alternative to their home school.

== Government ==
The township is governed by a three-member board of trustees, who are elected in November of odd-numbered years to a four-year term beginning on the following January 1. Two are elected in the year after the presidential election and one is elected in the year before it. There is also an elected township fiscal officer, who serves a four-year term beginning on April 1 of the year after the election, which is held in November of the year before the presidential election. Vacancies in the fiscal officership or on the board of trustees are filled by the remaining trustees.
