= Jim Miller (musician) =

American singer-songwriter

Jim Miller (born 1954) is a rock and roll guitarist, singer, teacher, recording artist and band leader in the “jam band” genre’. He has performed with Oroboros and his present group, JiMiller Band. He has also founded and organized several events, including co-founding the Rock & Reggae Festival and founding Lazy Daisy and DeadFall at Nelson Ledges State Park in northeast Ohio. He lives in Cleveland, Ohio.

== Personal history ==
Miller was born July 2, 1954, at the historic St. Ann's Hospital in Cleveland, Ohio. He has a wife, Beth, a son named Michael who plays guitar in the JiMiller Band, and two stepchildren, Reid and Sarah Street.

== Oroboros ==
Miller co-founded Oroboros in 1980 as a Grateful Dead tribute band, which soon generated original music in the jam band genre. It was named for the ouroboros, an ancient symbol for infinity, depicting a serpent or dragon eating its own tail. Among the bands they have opened for are Go Ahead (with members of the Grateful Dead and Santana), The Radiators, Black Uhuru, Santana and Rusted Root. They co-founded the Rock & Reggae Festival in 1984 with First Light at Meadowoods Farm, originally as a benefit for the Cleveland Free Clinic. They performed until 1998, produced five albums, and played a reunion concert in 2003.

=== Past members ===
- Jim Miller (guitar & vocals)
- Bill Cogan (guitar & vocals)
- Mary Beth Cooper (vocals, etc.)
- Gary Maxwell (bass)
- Rocky Miller (keyboards)
- Rob Luoma (drums).
- Dave Downing (bass)
- Don Safranek (percussion)
- Will Douglas (drums)
- Scott Swanson (bass)
- Mike Rotman (keyboard, guitar, percussion)
- Mike Verbick (guitar)
- Michael Bradley (keyboards, vocals)
- Ned Kalafat (bass)

=== Highlights ===
- 1984 - Co-Founded the Rock & Reggae Festival with the band First Light
- 1994 - HORDE Tour (Blossom Music Center)
- 1991 – opened for Phish at the Agora (Cleveland, Ohio)
- 1995, 1996 & 1997 (July) – Starwood Festival (Sherman, New York)
- 1996 - Southern Thailand Jazz Festival
- 1996 - Furthur Festival
- 2003 - Reunion

=== Discography ===
- 1985 - Different Feeling
- 1988 - Psycha Deli: Live at the Euclid Tavern
- 1991 - First Circle
- 1993 - Serpent's Dance
- 1996 - Shine

== JiMiller Band ==
The JiMiller Band was founded in 1998 by Jim Miller, continuing to play the style of jam band music Miller played with Oroboros. They have performed since their founding, sharing the stage with such notable bands and artists as String Cheese Incident, Galactic, Bruce Hornsby, Little Feat, Rusted Root and the Rhythm Devils, and produced four CDs.

=== Current roster ===
- Jim Miller - Lead Vocals & Lead Guitar
- Vince Berry - Guitar
- Steve "Nev" Scheff - Keyboard & Vocals
- Brian "Bagel" Golenberg - Drums & Vocals
- Dave Blackerby – Bass

=== Past members ===
- Brett Miller (bass)
- Matt Harmon (guitar, dobro)
- Dan Carter (drums)
- Rick Davidson (guitar)
- Steve Zavesky (drums)
- Mike Miller (guitar)

=== Highlights ===
- 2004 - 10,000 Lakes Festival
- 2005 & 2006 (summer) - opened for Little Feat at Cleveland's House of Blues
- 2007 (Memorial Day weekend) - opened for Rusted Root at Tower City Center Amphitheater (Cleveland)
- 2007 (New Year's Eve) – opened for Rusted Root at The House of Blues (Cleveland)
- 2009–2011 – opened for the Early Bird Festival at Nelson Ledges
- 2010 (Labor Day) - opened for the Rhythm Devils with Mickey Hart and Bill Kreutzmann from The Dead.
- 2012 - Starwood Festival at Wisteria Event Campground (Pomeroy, Ohio)

=== Discography ===
- 2000 - Rock and Roll Always Do
- 2001 - Crooked River Groove
- 2004 - Family Roots (Double Live CD)
- 2006 - In Trance It (Double CD: 1 Live, 1 Studio)

== Original Songs ==
- Sing It To Your Children
  - Sing It To Your Children - Oroboros - Different Feeling Released: 1985
  - Sing It To Your Children - Oroboros - Serpent's Dance Released: 1993 (Euclid Tavern, Cleveland OH, 2/26/93)
- North Coast Waters
  - North Coast Waters - Oroboros - Different Feeling Released: 1985
- Agathodaimon
  - Agathodaimon - Oroboros - Different Feeling Released: 1985
  - Agathodaimon - Oroboros - Serpent's Dance Released: 1993 (Shuba's, Chicago IL, 3/5/93)
- Shake It To The Limit
  - Shake It To The Limit - Oroboros - Different Feeling Released: 1985
  - Shake It To The Limit - Oroboros - Psycha Deli Released: 1988
- Syzygy
  - Syzygy - Oroboros - Psycha Deli Released: 1988
- Paradox
  - Paradox - Oroboros - Psycha Deli Released: 1988
- Win or Lose
  - Win or Lose - Oroboros - Psycha Deli Released: 1988
- Weather the Storm
  - Weather the Storm - Oroboros - Psycha Deli Released: 1988
- Fog Over the Flats
  - Fog Over the Flats - Oroboros - Psycha Deli Released: 1988
- Laughing at Harpo
  - Laughing at Harpo - Oroboros - Psycha Deli Released: 1988
- Water Unto The Stone
  - Water Unto The Stone - Oroboros - First Circle Released: 1991
- Whispers of Love
  - Whispers of Love - Oroboros - First Circle Released: 1991
- Glad Messenger
  - Glad Messenger - Oroboros - First Circle Released: 1991
- The Griffon Song
  - The Griffon Song - Oroboros - First Circle Released: 1991
- King Kong II
  - King Kong II - Oroboros - First Circle Released: 1991
- See You Smile
  - See You Smile - Oroboros - First Circle Released: 1991
- Smell the Roses
  - Smell the Roses - Oroboros - Serpent's Dance Released: 1993 (Euclid Tavern, Cleveland OH, 2/26/93)
- The River Runs
  - The River Runs - Oroboros - Serpent's Dance Released: 1993 (Shuba's, Chicago IL, 3/5/93)
- Funk in A
  - Funk in A - Oroboros - Serpent's Dance Released: 1993 (Euclid Tavern, Cleveland OH, 4/9/93)
- Siddhartha's Train
  - Siddhartha's Train - Oroboros - Serpent's Dance Released: 1993 (Euclid Tavern, Cleveland OH, 4/9/93)
- The Friend Song
  - The Friend Song - Oroboros - Serpent's Dance Released: 1993 (Tulagi's, Boulder CO, 3/27/93)
- Shakin' the Cage
  - Shakin' the Cage - Oroboros - Serpent's Dance Released: 1993 (Euclid Tavern, Cleveland OH, 4/9/93)
- Calliope - Oroboros
  - Calliope - Oroboros - Shine Released: 1996
- Do All You Can
  - Do All You Can - Oroboros - Shine Released: 1996
- Leaving This Place Too Soon
  - Leaving This Place Too Soon - Oroboros - Shine Released: 1996
- Far and Few
  - Far and Few - Oroboros - Shine Released: 1996
- Big Black Snake Blues
  - Big Black Snake Blues - Oroboros - Shine Released: 1996
- San Juan Man
  - San Juan Man - Oroboros - Shine Released: 1996
- Cuyahoga Bayou
  - Cuyahoga Bayou - Oroboros - Shine Released: 1996
- Won't Be Long
  - Won't Be Long - Oroboros - Shine Released: 1996
- You Shine
  - You Shine - Oroboros - Shine Released: 1996
