= Bristol Local School District (Bristolville, Ohio) =

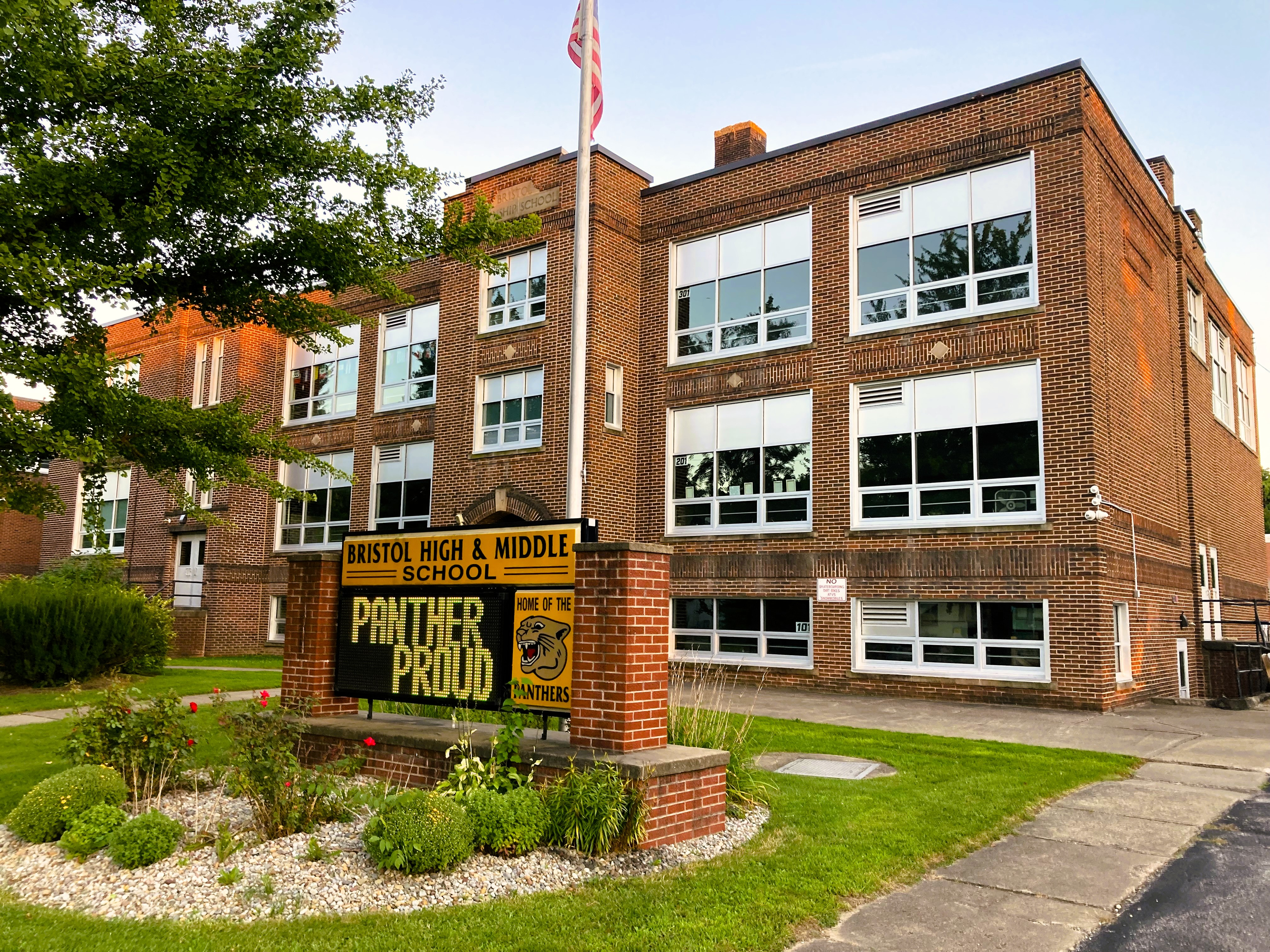

Location
- 1845 Greenville Rd. NW; Bristolville, Ohio 44402; United States; 41°23′11.89″N 80°52′3.08″W

Information
- Type: Public
- Established: 1888
- School district: Bristol Local School District
- NCES District ID: 3905011
- Superintendent: Christopher Dray
- Teaching staff: 37.80 (on an FTE basis)
- Grades: K-12
- Enrollment: 408 (2024-2025)
- Student to teacher ratio: 13.87
- Campus type: Rural
- Colors: Black and Gold
- Mascot: Panthers
- Website: Bristol High School

The Bristol Local School District is a school district located in Bristol Township in Trumbull County, Ohio, United States. The school district serves one high school, one middle school and one elementary school within their K-12 campus located at 1845 Greenville Rd, Bristolville, Ohio 44402 United States

== History ==
Education in Bristol Township began in 1810, though secondary schooling as not introduced until near the end of the 19th century. The first students at Bristol High School graduated in 1888. The centralization of Bristol's education began in 1915 with the construction of a new three-story building, which was completed in 1918.

In 1988, Bristol Local School District merged with the neighboring Farmington Local School District, which gave the school district 400 additional pupils. The West Farmington school was used as the k-8 building until the 2004–2005 school year when the Bristol expansion was finished. The playground was not taken to the Bristol school at the time of the move and is now set up as a public play space in West Farmington. The building is currently owned by a private citizen.

In 2018, the school district celebrated the one hundredth anniversary of the current building.

== Schools ==
=== High School ===
Bristol High School

=== Middle School ===
Bristol Middle School

=== Elementary School ===
Bristol Elementary School
