= Ohio State Route 282 =

State highway in northeastern Ohio, US

State Route 282

Route information
- Maintained by ODOT
- Length: 3.05 mi (4.91 km)
- Existed: 1930–present

Major junctions
- South end: SR 305 near Nelson
- North end: US 422 near Parkman

Location
- Country: United States
- State: Ohio
- Counties: Portage, Geauga

Highway system
- Ohio State Highway System; Interstate; US; State; Scenic
← SR 281	→ SR 283

State Route 282 (SR 282) is a north–south state highway in northeastern Ohio, a U.S. state. The southern terminus of SR 282 is at a T-intersection with SR 305 near the hamlet of Nelson. Its northern terminus is also at a T-intersection, this time with the four-lane divided U.S. Route 422 (US 422) approximately two miles (3.2 km) southeast of Parkman. SR 282 primarily serves as an access route for Nelson Kennedy Ledges State Park. For its duration, the highway is also known as Nelson Ledge Road.

== Route description ==
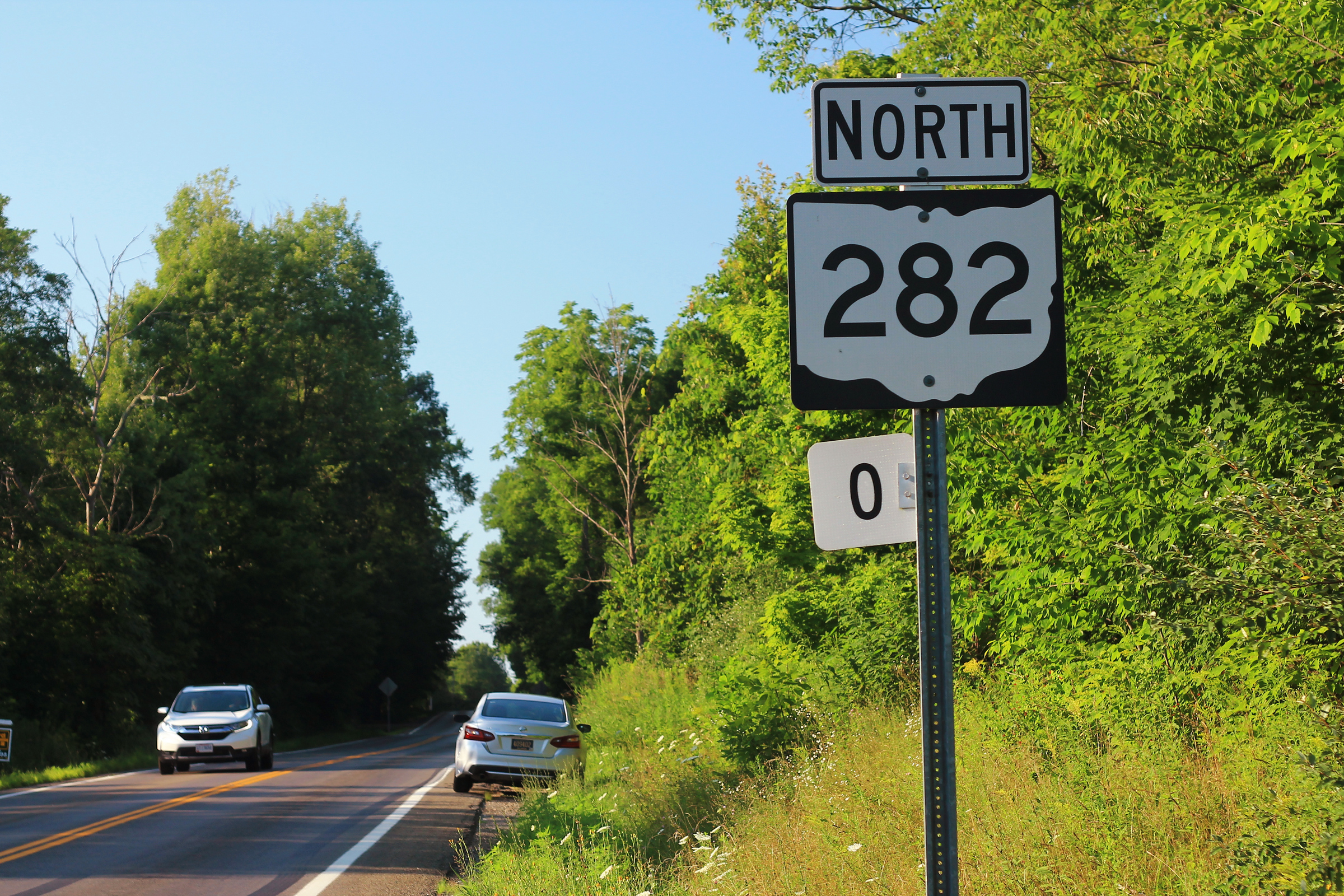
State Route 282 near its southern terminus.

Beginning from a T-intersection with SR 305 in northeastern Portage County's Nelson Township, SR 282 heads northerly through wooded terrain. Passing a couple of homes along the way, it passes a large pond as it bends to the north-northeast, and passes into Nelson Kennedy Ledges State Park. Bending back to the north-northwest, the highway travels past a couple of homes that line the east side of the roadway, then comes upon its intersection with Kennedy Ledge Road. Continuing to the northwest through the forest, SR 282 passes a parking area for the state park. Departing the park, the state highway passes the Nelson Ledge Estates, followed by an intersection with Bancroft Road, after which it bends back to the north. A blend of woods and homes appear on the west side of the highway, with farmland dominant on the east side. Following the Pritchard Road intersection, SR 282 bends to the northeast, and passes a small lake, along with an access road to a nearby mobile home park. The highway now enters Geauga County's Parkman Township. Less than one-half mile (0.80 km) from there, SR 282 comes to an end at its T-intersection with the four-lane divided US 422 southeast of the hamlet of Parkman.

SR 282 is not included as a part of the National Highway System.

== History ==
SR 282 was designed in 1930. Originally, it was an L-shaped route that began at SR 88 north of Garrettsville, and occupied what is now SR 305 from that point east to what is currently the southern terminus of SR 282, then followed its current path up to US 422 southeast of Parkman.

In 1937, with the westward extension of SR 305, SR 282 is re-routed into Garretsville. From its current southern terminus, SR 282 ran concurrent with the newly extended SR 305 into Nelson, then utilized Parkman Road going south a short distance to Center Road, which SR 282 followed southwesterly into Garretsville, where it came to an end at SR 82. By 1971, SR 282 was shortened to the routing that it currently occupies today, with jurisdiction of the Center Road and Parkman Road stretches being turned back to local control, and the concurrent portion along SR 305 becoming just SR 305 solo.

== Major intersections ==
County	Location	mi	km	Destinations	Notes
Portage	Nelson Township	0.00	0.00	SR 305	
Geauga	Parkman Township	3.05	4.91	US 422 (Main Market Road)	
1.000 mi = 1.609 km; 1.000 km = 0.621 mi
