= Woodrow House =

Woodrow House may refer to:

in the United States

- William Woodrow House, Champion, Ohio, listed on the NRHP in Trumbull County, Ohio
- Mattoon-Woodrow House, Worthington, Ohio, listed on the NRHP in Franklin County, Ohio

== See also ==
- Woodrow Ruin, Cliff, New Mexico, listed on the NRHP in Grant County, New Mexico
