= Bristolville, Ohio =

- Unincorporated community
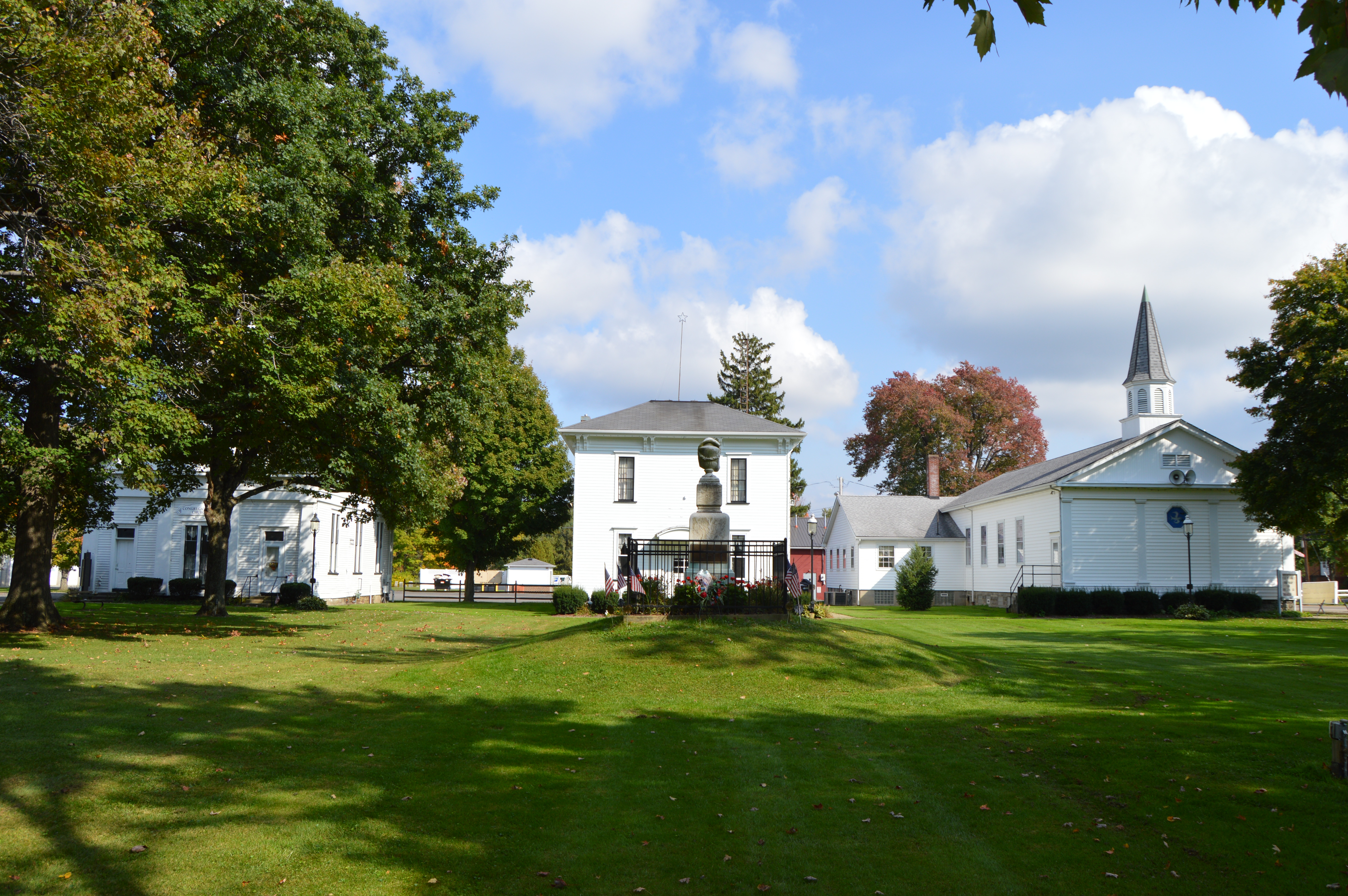
- A Civil War monument sits in the middle of the town green

- Location within Ohio
- Country: United States
- State: Ohio
- County: Trumbull
- Township: Bristol
- Elevation: 899 ft (274 m)
- Time zone: UTC-5 (Eastern (EST))
  - Summer (DST): UTC-4 (EDT)
- ZIP code: 44402
- GNIS feature ID: 1056721

Bristolville is an unincorporated community in central Bristol Township, Trumbull County, Ohio, United States. It lies at the intersection of State Routes 45 and 88 and has a post office with the ZIP code 44402. It is part of the Youngstown–Warren metropolitan area.

The train station was nearby at Bristolville Station and was served by the Spokane Post Office.

== History ==
Bristolville was founded in 1807, and named after Bristol, Connecticut, the native home of a first settler. Northern Ohio had settlers mostly from the Northeast, many of whom supported abolition of slavery before the Civil War.

One of the notable natives of Bristolville is John Henrie Kagi, who fought with John Brown in Bleeding Kansas before its admission to the Union. He was second in command during Brown's Harper's Ferry raid on the federal arsenal, where he was killed by state militia at the age of 24. Kagi's sister, Barbara Mayhew and her husband Allen, also Bristolville natives, migrated to Nebraska City, Nebraska in the early 1850s. With Kagi's help, they created a cave under their cabin to shelter fugitive slaves on their way to freedom in Canada. Their 1855 cabin has been restored as the Mayhew Cabin museum, and is the only site in Nebraska recognized by the National Park Service as a station on the Underground Railroad.

== Education ==
Children in Bristolville are served by the Bristol Local School District. The district has one K-12 building in Bristolville, administered as two separate schools:

- Bristol Elementary School – grades K-6
- Bristol High School – grades 7–12

== Notable residents ==
- John Henry Kagi, abolitionist, and second in command to John Brown in Brown's raid on Harper's Ferry
- Margaret Eliza Maltby, physicist
