= Phalanx, Ohio =

Unincorporated community in Ohio, U.S.

Coordinates: 41°15′39″N 80°58′43″W

Phalanx is an unincorporated community in Braceville Township, Trumbull County, Ohio, United States. It is identified by signage as Phalanx Mills.

== History ==
A post office at Phalanx was established in 1872, and remained in operation until 1902. The community was named after the local Trumbull Phalanx Company, which was a utopian community based upon Charles Fourier's theories from 1844 to 1848 and again from 1849 to 1852. There were about 200 residents. The community sat on up to 2,000 acres (810 ha; 8,100,000 m^{2}) and had farm land, a grist mill, saw mill, oil mill, clothing works, and other enterprises.
