= Chalker High School =

Public school in Ohio, US

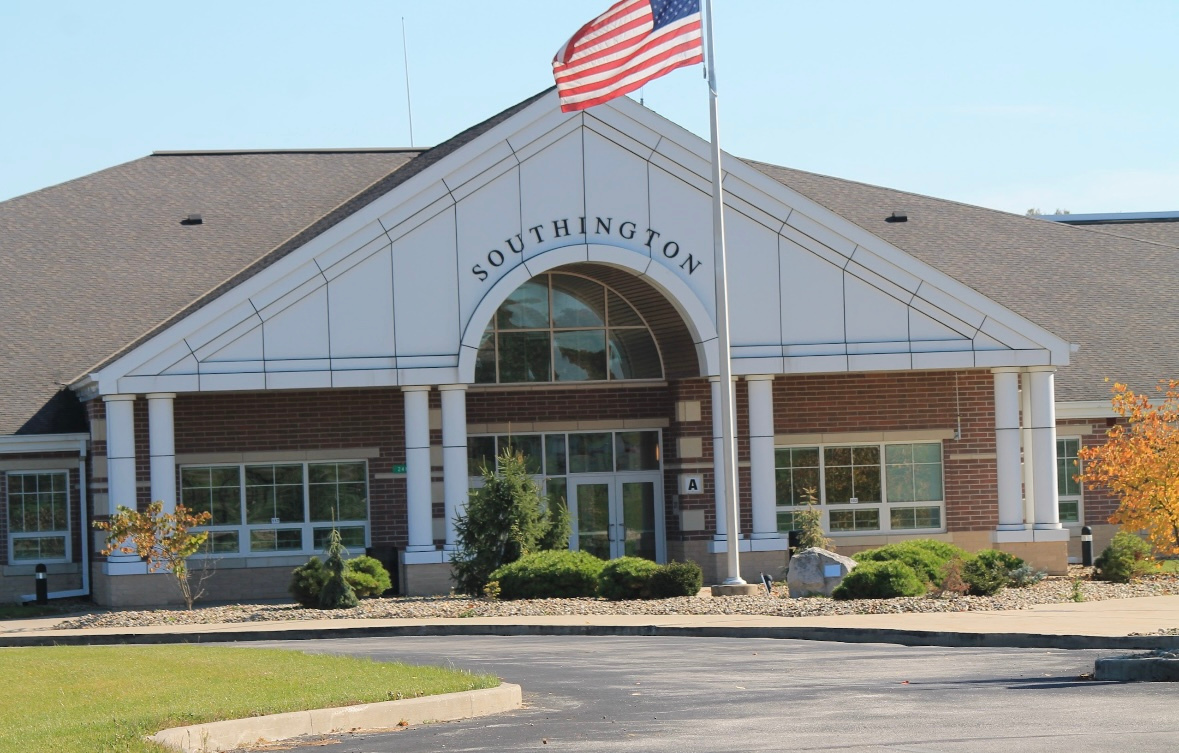
- Southington Local Schools K-12 campus, opened in 2011

Location
- 2482 State Route 534; Southington, Ohio 44470; United States
- Coordinates: 41°17′03″N 80°57′34″W

Information
- School type: Public
- Established: 1907
- School district: Southington Local School District
- NCES School ID: 390502303882
- Principal: Troy Beall
- Faculty: 9.00 (on an FTE basis)
- Grades: 9–12
- Enrollment: 127 (2024–25)
- Student to teacher ratio: 14.11
- Colors: Orange and black
- Athletics conference: Northeastern Athletic Conference; Northern 8 Football Conference (Football only)
- Team name: Wildcats
- Website: www.southingtonlocal.org/chalkerhighschool_home.aspx

Chalker High School is a public high school in Southington Township, Trumbull County, Ohio. It is the only high school in the Southington Local School District. Athletic teams are known as the Wildcats and compete in the Ohio High School Athletic Association as a member of the Northeastern Athletic Conference. Since 2011, Chalker High School is housed at the Southington K–12 building. The original Chalker High School building, built in 1907, still stands adjacent to the district athletic fields. It is listed on the National Register of Historic Places as part of the Southington Township School, which includes the adjacent 1907 elementary school and the 1910 Civil War monument between the two buildings.

== History ==
Chalker High School is named for Newton Chalker, an attorney who was born in Southington in 1842. Chalker created an endowment for the high school when schools in the township agreed to consolidate smaller schools in a central location. The town agreed to consolidation, and the original campus was completed in 1907, consisting of the Chalker High School building and a smaller elementary school. Newton Chalker agreed to pay for Chalker High school, as long as the townspeople would pay for the elementary school building, which was not nearly as grand, totaling $6,000 as compared to the Chalker Building's $20,000. The high school was constructed in the Neoclassical Revival architectural style, including fluted columns and a pedimented gable. The building was listed on the National Register of Historic Places on February 4, 2011.

The current Chalker High School and the Southington Local Schools 43 acres (17 ha) K–12 campus was built on land donated by Mr. and Mrs. Donaldson, both residents of Southington. Classes began in the fall of 2011 in the new building.

== Athletics ==
Chalker High School currently offers:

- Baseball
- Bowling
- Basketball
- Cross country
- Cheerleading
- Football (8-man)
- Golf
- Softball
- Track and field
- Volleyball

=== State championships ===
- Girls softball – 1998

=== Facilities ===
The Southington Athletic Complex is located adjacent to the district's former school buildings on Ohio State Route 305. The complex features a football stadium, commonly referred to as "Wildcat Acres", and also includes three softball fields and one baseball field. The stadium seats 673 people and features a grass field with an electronic scoreboard and an outdoor track, which is available to the public. The athletic complex was renovated in 2013, which included the addition of the outdoor track, new stands, a new locker room, and lights for the stadium.

== Organizations ==
CHS offers a number of student organizations including a drone racing team, chess team, and Spanish club, along with chapters of the National Beta Club and the National Honor Society. Both the drone racing team and the chess team participate in local competitions. Beta club is the school's academic honors program that heavily emphasizes community service. Students must maintain a 3.0 grade point average and fulfill 10 hours of community service to maintain membership. The school's chapter of the National Honor Society recognizes students who excel in the program's main criteria of scholarship, service, leadership, and character.

== Notable alumni ==
- Chad Petty – former professional baseball player in Minor League Baseball
- Rick Badanjek – former professional football player in the National Football League (NFL)
