= Center of the World, Ohio =

- Unincorporated area
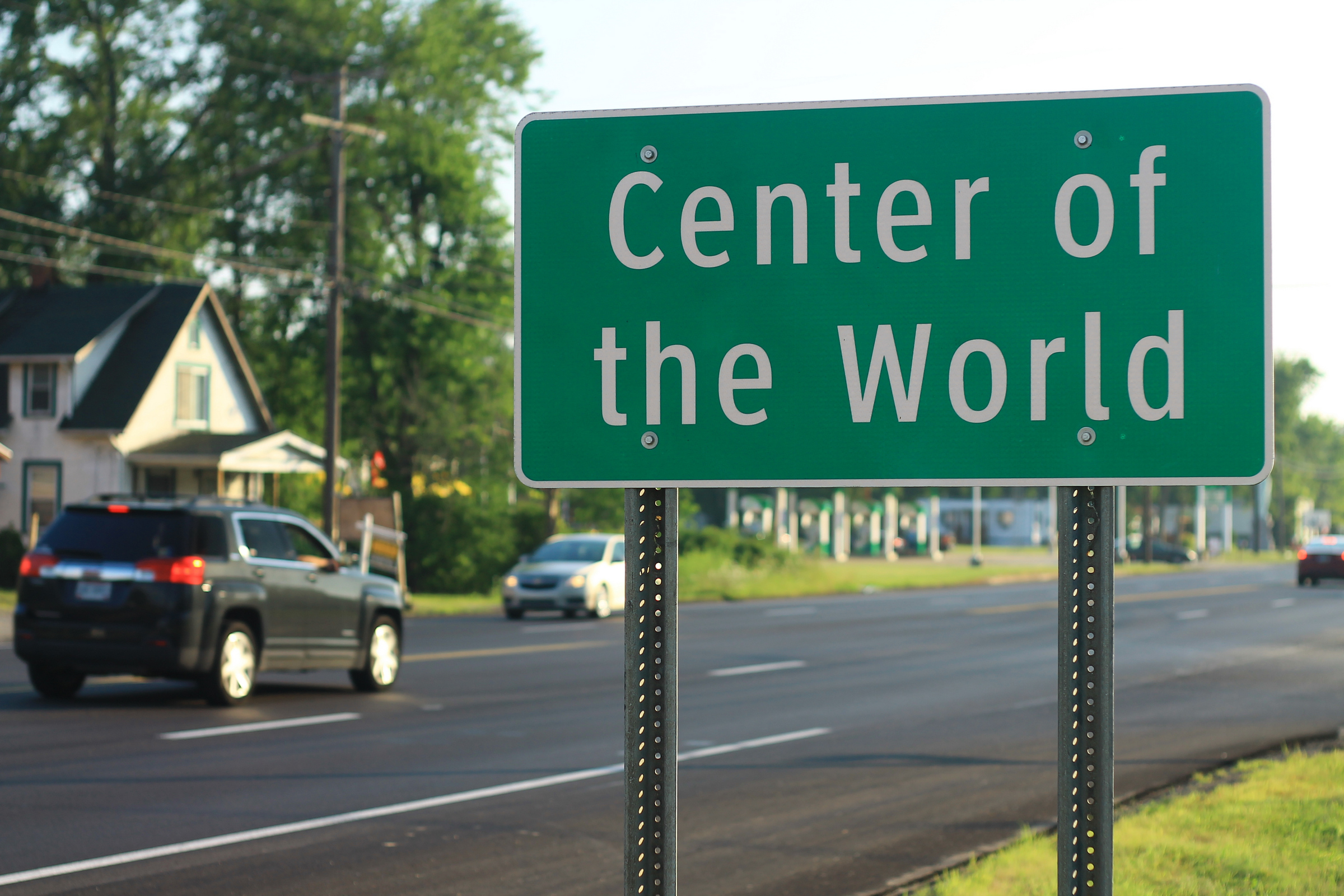
- Sign at entrance of community

- Location in Ohio
- Coordinates: 41°13′42″N 80°54′35″W
- Country: United States
- State: Ohio
- County: Trumbull
- Time zone: UTC-5 (Eastern (EST))
  - Summer (DST): UTC-4 (EDT)

Center of the World is an unincorporated community in far eastern Braceville Township, Trumbull County, Ohio, United States. It consists of several houses and a few retail establishments centered at the crossroads where State Routes 82 and 5 diverge.

The community was founded by Randall Wilmot, an eccentric investor who had plans to make his new community a major economic center in northeast Ohio. When the railroads used the nearby city of Warren as the regional hub, Center of the World fell into decline both in terms of population and industry.

Center of the World is part of the Youngstown–Warren–Boardman, Ohio-Pennsylvania Metropolitan Statistical Area.
