= Ohio State Route 305 =

State highway in northeastern Ohio, US

State Route 305

Route information
- Maintained by ODOT
- Length: 33.99 mi (54.70 km)
- Existed: 1932–present

Major junctions
- West end: SR 82 / SR 700 in Hiram
- US 422 near Warren; SR 11 near Cortland; SR 7 in Hartford
- East end: PA 718 near Orangeville

Location
- Country: United States
- State: Ohio
- Counties: Portage, Trumbull

Highway system
- Ohio State Highway System; Interstate; US; State; Scenic
← SR 304	→ SR 306

State Route 305 (SR 305) is a 33.99-mile (54.70 km) long east–west state highway in the northeastern portion of the U.S. state of Ohio. The western terminus of SR 305 is at a signalized intersection with the duplex of SR 82 and SR 700 in the village of Hiram. Its eastern terminus is at a five-way stop intersection on the Pennsylvania state line nearly 1.75 miles (2.82 km) south of Orangeville. Picking up where SR 305 leaves off heading southeast into Pennsylvania from this intersection is PA 718.

== Route description ==
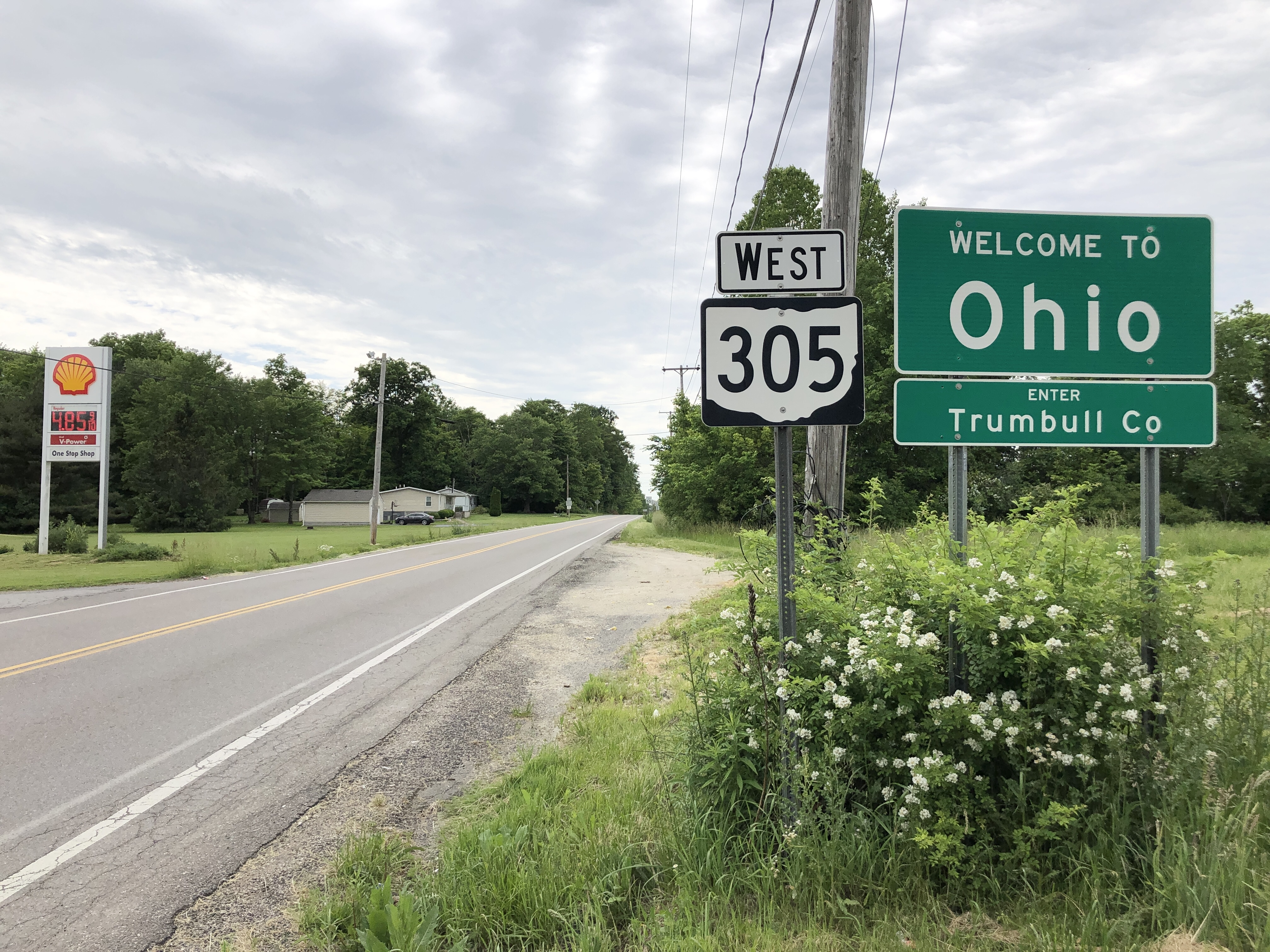
OH 305 at the state line from PA 718

SR 305's path takes it through the northeastern quadrant of Portage County and across the central part of Trumbull County. There are no segments of SR 305 that are included as a part of the National Highway System (NHS). The NHS is a network of highways identified as being most important for the economy, mobility and defense of the nation.

== History ==
SR 305 was applied in 1932. The highway was originally a very short route that existed only along its present easternmost stretch between its junction with SR 7 and its connection with PA 718 at the Pennsylvania state line. This remained the case until 1937, when SR 305 was extended west along previously un-numbered roads across Trumbull County and into northeastern Portage County to its current western terminus in Hiram.

== Major intersections ==
County	Location	mi	km	Destinations	Notes
Portage	Hiram	0.00	0.00	SR 82 (Wakefield Road) / SR 700 (Garfield Road) – Aurora, Burton	Western terminus of SR 305
Portage	Hiram–Nelson township line	2.34	3.77	SR 88 – Garrettsville, Parkman	
Portage	Nelson Township	5.67	9.12	SR 282 north – Nelson Kennedy Ledges State Park	Southern terminus of SR 282
Trumbull	Southington Township	8.97	14.44	US 422 – Warren	
Trumbull	Southington Township	9.85	15.85	SR 534 / CR 744 (Warren Burton Road) – West Farmington, Newton Falls	
Trumbull	Champion Township	16.09	25.89	SR 45 – Warren, Orwell	
Trumbull	Bazetta Township	22.18	35.70	SR 5 – Cortland, Warren	
Trumbull	Cortland	22.76	36.63	SR 46 – Niles, Cortland	
Trumbull	Fowler Township	24.16	38.88	SR 11 – Girard, Ashtabula	Interchange
Trumbull	Fowler Township	26.77	43.08	SR 193 (Youngstown Kingsville Road) – Youngstown, Johnston, Airport	
Trumbull	Hartford Township	31.43	50.58	SR 7 – Youngstown, Kinsman	
Trumbull	Hartford Township	33.99	54.70	PA 718 south / Brockway Sharon Road – Sharon	Eastern terminus of SR 305 at Pennsylvania state line
1.000 mi = 1.609 km; 1.000 km = 0.621 mi
