= Champion Township, Ohio =

Township in Ohio, US

Champion Township, Trumbull County, Ohio
- Township
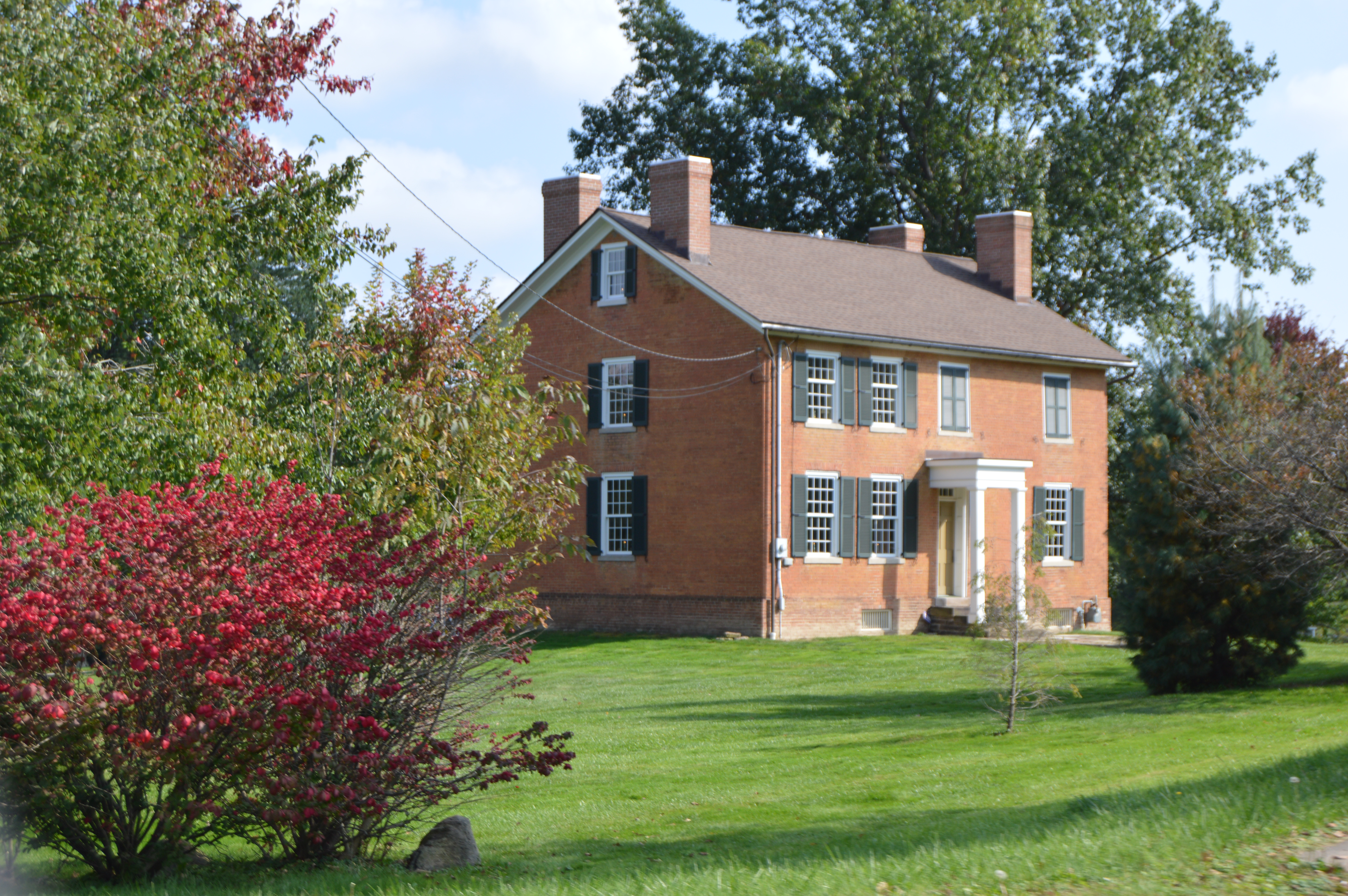
- The William Woodrow House, a historic site in the township

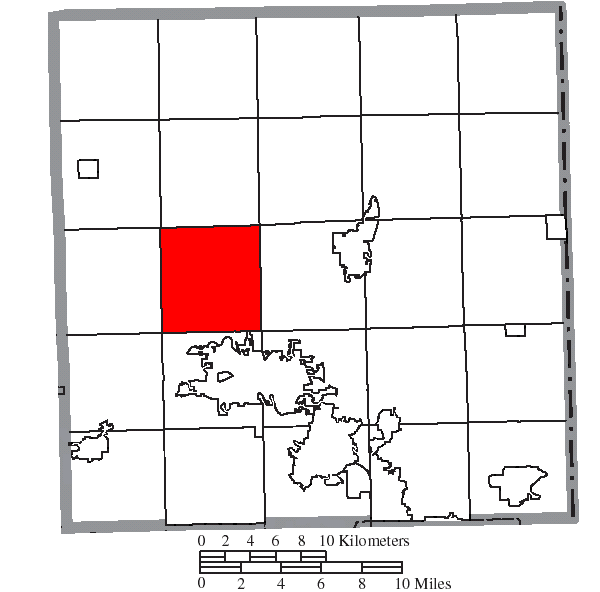
- Location of Champion Township in Trumbull County
- Coordinates: 41°17′47″N 80°51′7″W
- Country: United States
- State: Ohio
- County: Trumbull

Area
  - Total: 25.8 sq mi (66.8 km^{2})
  - Land: 25.8 sq mi (66.8 km^{2})
  - Water: 0 sq mi (0.0 km^{2})
- Elevation: 958 ft (292 m)

Population (2020)
  - Total: 9,381
  - Density: 364/sq mi (140/km^{2})
- Time zone: UTC-5 (Eastern (EST))
  - Summer (DST): UTC-4 (EDT)
- ZIP code: 44483
- Area codes: 234/330
- FIPS code: 39-13470
- GNIS feature ID: 1087027

Champion Township is one of the twenty-four townships of Trumbull County, Ohio, United States. The 2020 census found 9,381 people in the township.

== Geography ==
Located in the western part of the county, it borders the following townships:

- Bristol Township - north
- Mecca Township - northeast corner
- Bazetta Township - east
- Howland Township - southeast corner
- Warren Township - south
- Braceville Township - southwest corner
- Southington Township - west
- Farmington Township - northwest corner

No municipalities are located in Champion Township, although the census-designated place of Champion Heights is located in the township's south.

== History ==
The land that became Champion Township was originally part of the Connecticut Western Reserve, then was purchased by the Connecticut Land Company. The land that became the township was divided among nine or ten shareholders, one of whom, General Henry Champion, originally owned much of the property and had acquired all of the township land by December 1798. Trumbull County was established in 1800 and the township was named "Champion Township" for the man who owned it.

Henry Champion sold few of the parcels of the land that he owned, hoping to wait for the price to rise from $2.50 an acre to $10.00 an acre. The first permanent settler was William Rutan, who arrived from Pennsylvania in 1806. Over the next two decades, only six more families moved to the township. Henry Champion died in 1825, with the western half of the township going to his son, Aristarchus Champion and the eastern half to his son-in-law, Henry C. Trumbull. In 1826, both hired a surveyor to sell the land at market price. Champion Township was organized in December 1831.

It is the only Champion Township statewide.

== Government ==
The township is governed by a three-member board of trustees, who are elected in November of odd-numbered years to a four-year term beginning on the following January 1. Two are elected in the year after the presidential election and one is elected in the year before it. There is also an elected township fiscal officer, who serves a four-year term beginning on April 1 of the year after the election, which is held in November of the year before the presidential election. Vacancies in the fiscal officership or on the board of trustees are filled by the remaining trustees.
