= Rick Badanjek =

American football player (born 1962)

No. 26, 33, 47
- Position: Running back

Personal information
- Born: April 25, 1962 (age 64); Warren, Ohio, U.S.
- Listed height: 5 ft 8 in (1.73 m)
- Listed weight: 217 lb (98 kg)

Career information
- High school: Chalker (Southington Township, Ohio)
- College: Maryland
- NFL draft: 1986: 7th round, 186th overall pick

Career history
- Washington Redskins (1986); Atlanta Falcons (1987–1988)

Career NFL statistics
- Rushing yards: 87
- Rushing average: 3
- Touchdowns: 1
- Stats at Pro Football Reference

Richard Alan Badanjek (born April 25, 1962) is an American former professional football player who was a running back in the National Football League (NFL) for the Washington Redskins and Atlanta Falcons. He played college football for the Maryland Terrapins.

== Early life ==
Badanjek was born April 25, 1962 in Southington, Ohio. Badanjek grew up with interracial parents.

Badanjek was a 1981 graduate of Chalker High School in the tiny rural town of Southington, Ohio, where he led the Wildcats to their best season in school history his senior year at 9–1, winning Team MVP. He ran for 5,336 yards throughout his four years at the prep level, including over 2,000 yards and winning the OHSAA Class A Offensive Back of the Year his senior season.

In a game against the former Ledgemont High School in 1980, Badanjek rushed for around 475 yards, en route to a 45–8 victory.

== College career ==
Following his career at Chalker High School, Badanjek committed to the University of Maryland, where he played from 1982 to 1985. During his collegiate career, he rushed for 2,417 yards and scored 44 rushing touchdowns and 46 total touchdowns, which were Maryland school records. He was inducted into the University of Maryland Athletics Hall of Fame in 2021.

In the 1984 Sun Bowl against Tennessee, Badanjek rushed for 90 yards and two touchdowns. His one-yard touchdown run with 2:28 remaining game Maryland a 28–27 lead, which became the final score. Badanjek was named the game's Most Valuable Player.

=== College statistics ===
Year	School	Conference	Rushing						Receiving			
Year	School	Conference	Pos	G	Att	Yds	Avg	TD	Rec	Yds	Avg	TD
1982	Maryland	ACC	RB	11	62	274	4.4	9	5	53	10.6	0
1983	Maryland	ACC	RB	11	131	635	4.8	8	26	296	11.4	1
1984	Maryland	ACC	RB	11	173	832	4.8	15	20	174	8.7	1
1985	Maryland	ACC	RB	11	155	676	4.4	12	18	166	9.2	0
Career					521	2417	4.6	44	69	689	10.0	2

== Professional career ==
Badanjek was selected 186th in the seventh round in the 1986 NFL draft by the Washington Redskins. He appeared in six games for Washington during his rookie season before being placed on injured reserve with a hamstring injury.

Badanjek later played for the Atlanta Falcons. During the 1987 season, he started two games and rushed 29 times for 87 yards and one touchdown. He also recorded six receptions for 35 yards and returned two kickoffs for 27 yards. All of which were Badanjek's career highs. He was the Falcons' leading rusher during the three-game replacement player portion of the 1987 season.

Badanjek appeared in six additional games for the Falcons in 1988, before being released in November. He finished his NFL career having appeared in 14 games. Including two starts over three seasons with Washington and Atlanta.

=== Professional statistics ===
Season	Team	Rushing									Receiving			
Season	Team	Pos	No.	GP	GS	Att	Yds	Lng	TD	Fmb	Rec	Yds	Lng	TD
1986	WAS	RB	26	6	0	-	-	-	0		-	-	-	0
1987	ATL	RB	33	2	2	29	87	31	1	1	6	35	16	0
1988	ATL	RB	47	6	0	-	-	-	0		-	-	-	0
Career				14	2	29	87		1	1	6	35		0
