= Champion Heights, Ohio =

- Census-designated place
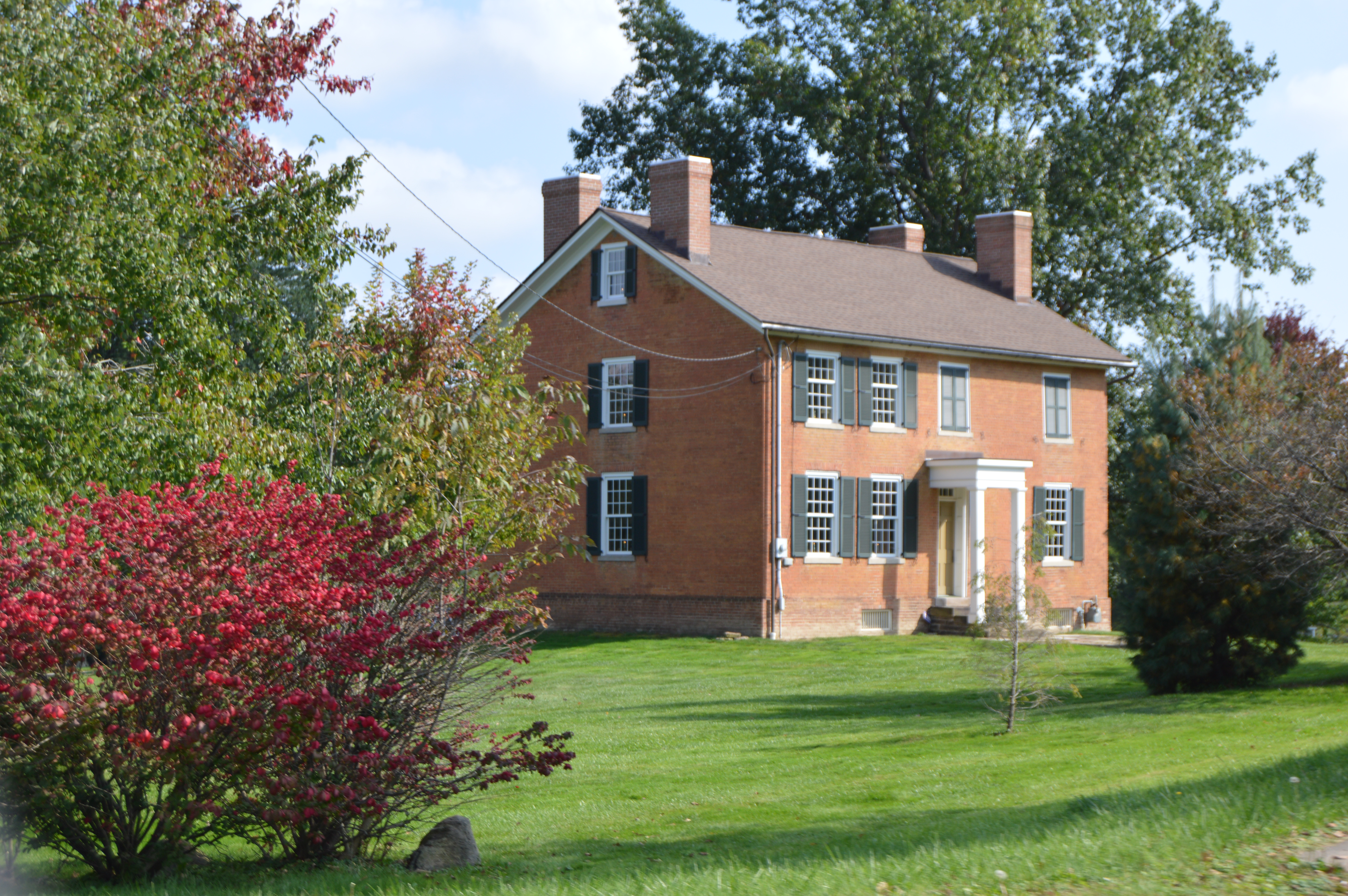
- William Woodrow House

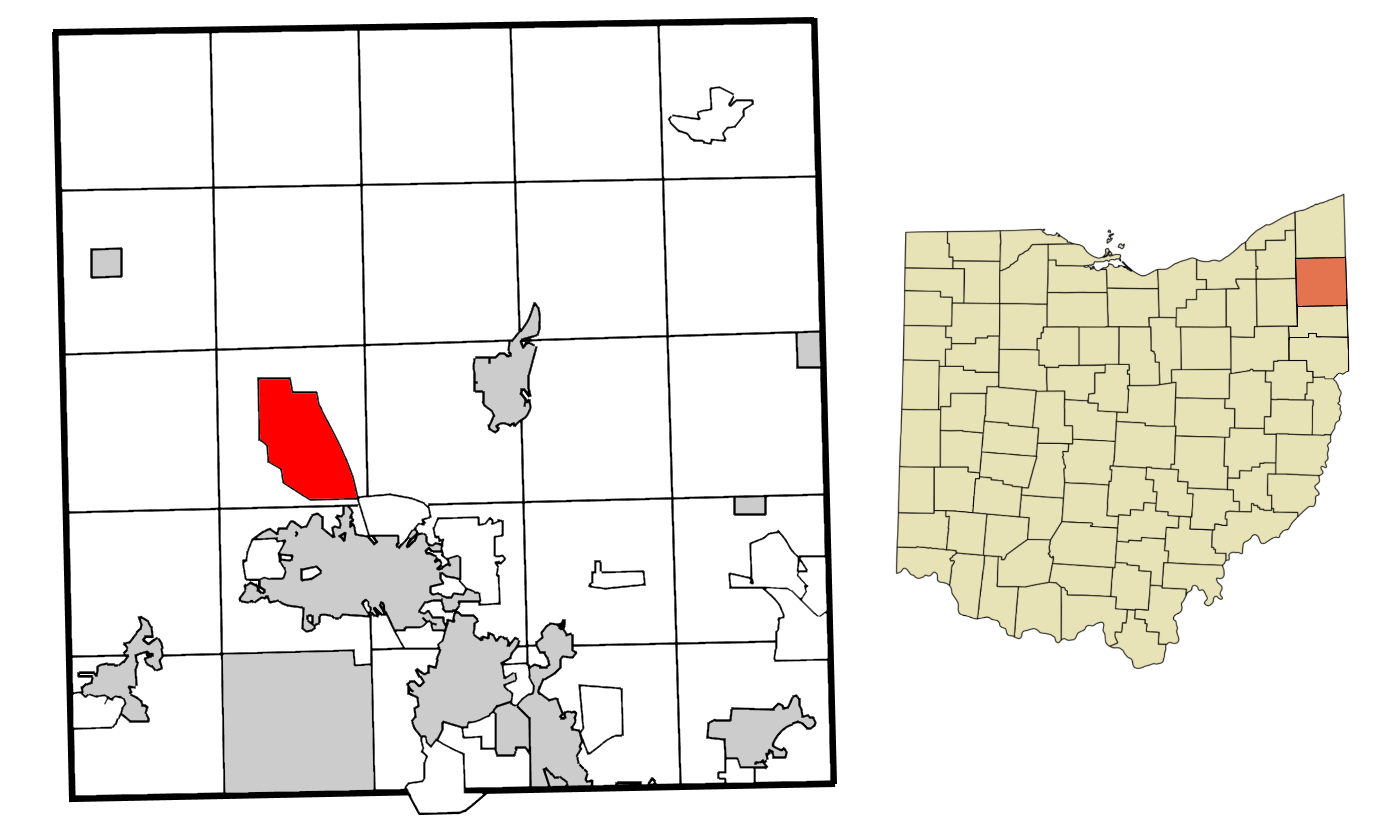
- Location of Champion Heights in Trumbull County, Ohio.
- Coordinates: 41°18′36″N 80°51′50″W
- Country: United States
- State: Ohio
- County: Trumbull

Area
  - Total: 8.37 sq mi (21.67 km^{2})
  - Land: 8.37 sq mi (21.67 km^{2})
  - Water: 0 sq mi (0.00 km^{2})
- Elevation: 938 ft (286 m)

Population (2020)
  - Total: 6,386
  - Density: 763/sq mi (294.7/km^{2})
- Time zone: UTC-5 (Eastern (EST))
  - Summer (DST): UTC-4 (EDT)
- FIPS code: 39-13484
- GNIS feature ID: 2393372

Champion Heights is an unincorporated community and census-designated place in Champion Township, Trumbull County, Ohio, United States. The population was 6,386 at the 2020 census. It is part of the Youngstown–Warren metropolitan area.

== History ==
A variant name was Champion. A post office was in operation under the name Champion in 1850 until 1858, and again from 1873 until it was discontinued in 1902. The community takes its name from Champion Township. Champion Township was originally part of the Connecticut Western Reserve, then was purchased by the Connecticut Land Company. The land that became the township was divided among nine or ten shareholders, one of whom, General Henry Champion, originally owned much of the property and had acquired all of the township land by December 1798, and it took his name.

== Geography ==
According to the United States Census Bureau, the CDP has a total area of 3.4 square miles (8.8 km^{2}), all land.

== Demographics ==
Historical population
Census	Pop.	Note	%±
1990	4,665		—
2000	4,727		1.3%
2010	6,498		37.5%
2020	6,386		−1.7%

As of the census of 2000, there were 4,727 people, 1,850 households, and 1,376 families residing in the CDP. The population density was 1,390.0 inhabitants per square mile (536.7/km^{2}). There were 1,897 housing units at an average density of 557.8 per square mile (215.4/km^{2}). The racial makeup of the CDP was 98.43% White, 0.66% African American, 0.32% Native American, 0.11% Asian, 0.08% from other races, and 0.40% from two or more races. Hispanic or Latino of any race were 0.63% of the population.

There were 1,850 households, out of which 31.6% had children under the age of 18 living with them, 61.2% were married couples living together, 10.3% had a female householder with no husband present, and 25.6% were non-families. 22.2% of all households were made up of individuals, and 11.8% had someone living alone who was 65 years of age or older. The average household size was 2.52 and the average family size was 2.94.

In the CDP the population was spread out, with 23.8% under the age of 18, 6.0% from 18 to 24, 28.6% from 25 to 44, 23.5% from 45 to 64, and 18.0% who were 65 years of age or older. The median age was 40 years. For every 100 females there were 89.5 males. For every 100 females age 18 and over, there were 84.7 males.

The median income for a household in the CDP was $42,472, and the median income for a family was $49,309. Males had a median income of $38,839 versus $24,801 for females. The per capita income for the CDP was $19,919. About 3.2% of families and 5.3% of the population were below the poverty line, including 8.3% of those under age 18 and 8.6% of those age 65 or over.
