= Nelson-Kennedy Ledges State Park =

Park in Ohio, USA

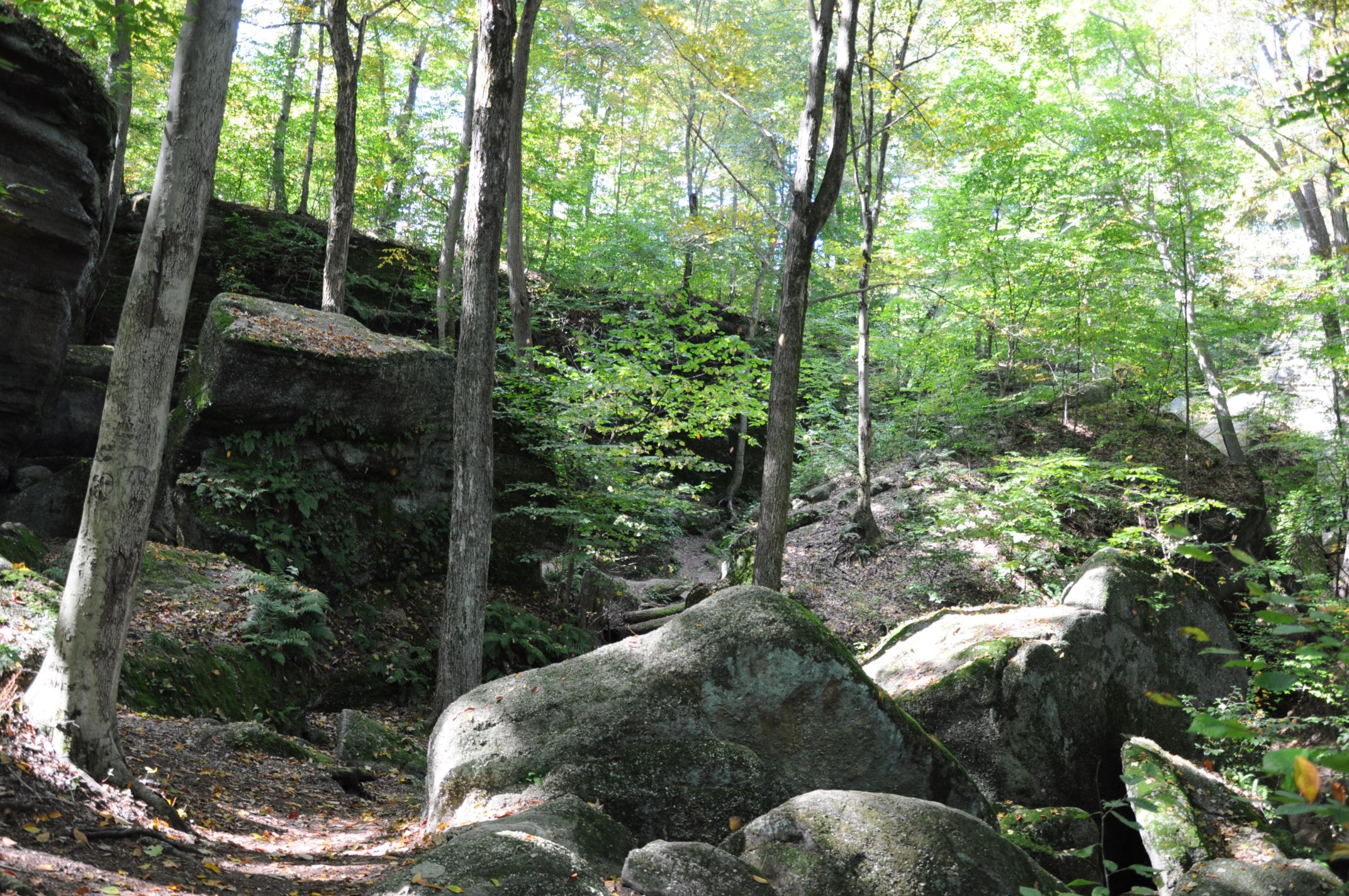

- Location within Ohio Location within the United States
- Location: Portage County, Ohio, United States
- Nearest town: Garrettsville, Ohio
- Coordinates: 41°19′34″N 81°02′19″W
- Area: 167 acres (68 ha)
- Elevation: 1,010 feet (310 m)
- Established: 1949
- Administrator: Ohio Department of Natural Resources
- Designation: Ohio state park
- Website: Nelson-Kennedy Ledges State Park

Nelson-Kennedy Ledges State Park is a 167-acre (68 ha) public recreation area offering trails and picnicking located in Nelson Township, Portage County, Ohio, United States. Within the park are angled rock formations 50 to 60 feet (18 m) high with ground fissures as deep as 60 feet (18 m). It is accessible from U.S. Route 422 and State Route 305 via State Route 282.

== History ==
In 1949, the state of Ohio established the park based on land it had previously purchased at Nelson Ledges and Kennedy Ledges.

In 2011, two deaths caused by falls from the park's cliffs were reported.

In 2022, the state approved $1.5 million in funding to add a glass observation bridge and trail signage to the park. The glass bridge opened in 2025.

== Description ==
The park is known for its rock formations, including the Devil's Icebox, Indian Pass and Old Maid's Kitchen. The park also features waterfalls and ground fissures, some of which are 60 feet deep. Vegetation includes trees like the yellow birch, Canadian hemlock, and Canada yew as well as ferns like the Christmas fern and maidenhair fern.

== Activities ==
The park is open from dawn until dusk. There are approximately 3 miles (4.8 km) of main hiking trails, as well as many unmarked and more dangerous paths. To mark off the trails, a color-coding system is used on the rocks and trees. White is moderately easy, yellow and blue are medium difficulty, and red is extremely difficult, with some climbing of rocks involved. It is located near Nelson Ledges Quarry Park, a large park and popular music venue.

Because of the cliffs and hazards along the trails, night hiking is not recommended due to the decreased visibility.
