= Bristol High School (Bristolville, Ohio) =

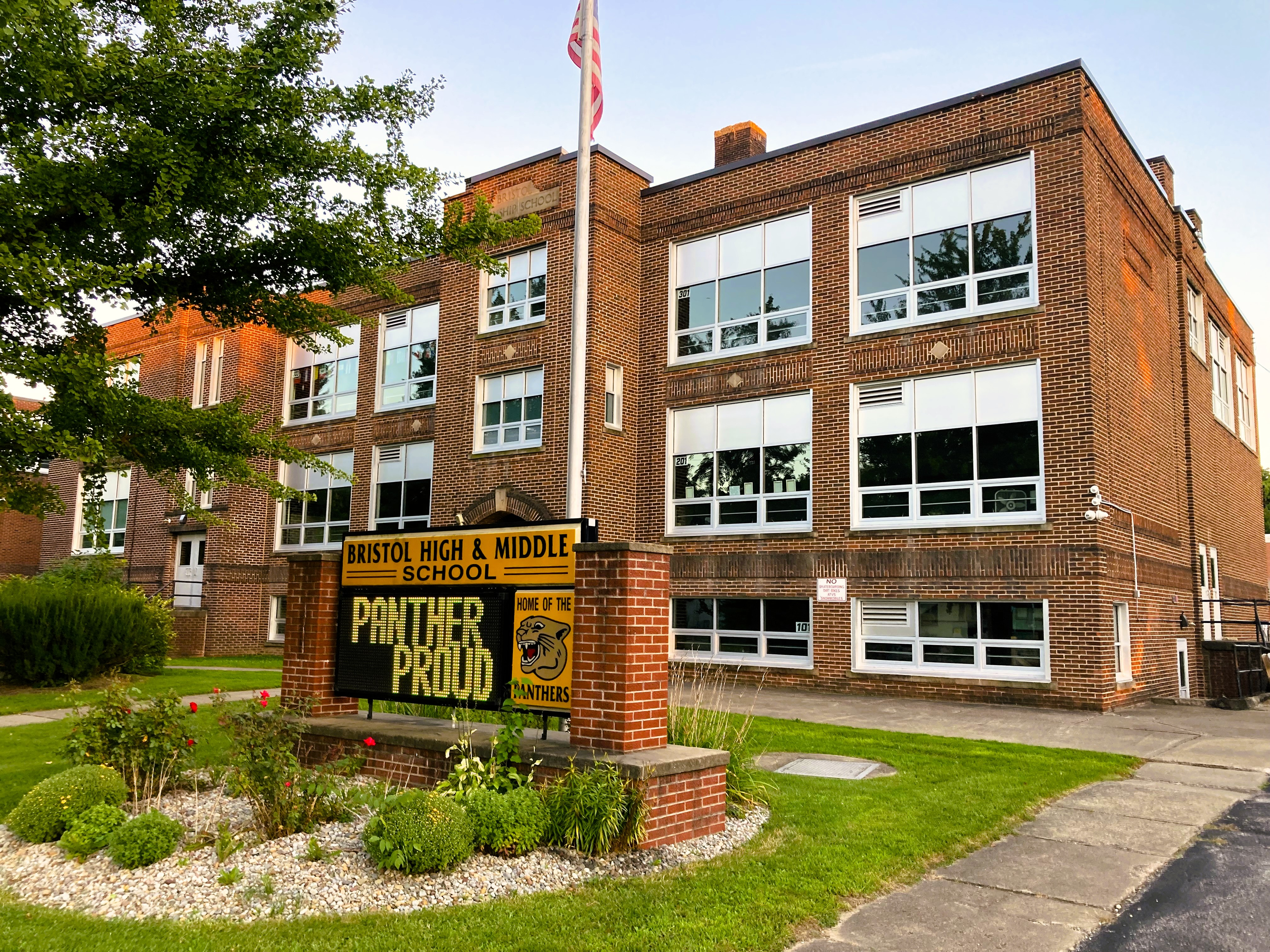

Location
- 1845 Greenville Rd. NW; Bristolville, Ohio 44402; United States; 41°23′11.89″N 80°52′3.08″W

Information
- Type: Public
- Established: 1888
- School district: Bristolville Local School District
- CEEB code: 360600
- NCES School ID: 390501103838
- Principal: Daniel Collins
- Teaching staff: 15.00 (on an FTE basis)
- Grades: 7–12
- Enrollment: 186 (2024-2025)
- Student to teacher ratio: 12.40
- Campus type: Rural
- Colors: Black and gold
- Athletics conference: Northeastern Athletic Conference
- Team name: Panthers
- Yearbook: Panther
- Feeder schools: Bristol Elementary School
- Website: Bristol High School

Bristol High School is a public high school in Bristolville, Ohio, Trumbull County, Ohio. It is the only school in the Bristol Local School District. Their nickname is the Panthers and compete as a member of the Ohio High School Athletic Association and is a member of the Northeastern Athletic Conference.

== History ==
Education in Bristol Township began in 1810, though secondary schooling as not introduced until near the end of the 19th century. The first students at Bristol High School graduated in 1888. The centralization of Bristol's education began in 1915 with the construction of a new three-story building, which was completed in 1918.

In 1988, Bristol Local School District merged with the neighboring Farmington Local School District, which gave the school district 400 additional pupils. The West Farmington school was used as the k-8 building until the 2004-2005 school year when the Bristol expansion was finished. The playground was not taken to the Bristol school at the time of the move and is now set up as a public play space in West Farmington. The building is currently owned by a private citizen.

In 2018, the school district celebrated the one hundredth anniversary of the current building.

== Extracurricular activities ==
Bristol High School currently offers band (concert, prep, and jazz), choir, National Honor Society, prep bowl/academic challenge, Spanish club, Science Club, student council, and Youngstown State University English Festival.

The school also has a yearbook club, which is responsible for the yearly publication of the yearbook Panther.

== Athletics ==
Bristol High School Currently Offers:

- Baseball
- Basketball
- Cheerleading
- Cross country
- Golf
- Soccer
- Softball
- Track
- Volleyball
