= Chad Petty =

American baseball player (born 1982)

- Pitcher
- Born: February 17, 1982 (age 44); Cleveland, Ohio, U.S.
- Bats: Left Throws: Left

Chad Petty (born February 17, 1982) is an American former professional baseball pitcher. Petty was the Ohio Gatorade Player of the Year in 2000. He was drafted 48th overall in the 2000 MLB draft by the Detroit Tigers. Petty played for several minor league affiliates for the Tigers, Milwaukee Brewers, and St. Louis Cardinals, before finishing his career in the Frontier League.

== Personal life ==
Chad Petty was born February 17, 1982, in Cleveland, Ohio. Petty was a 2000 graduate of Chalker High School in Southington, Ohio. Petty was selected for several awards for baseball in 2000 such as, All-Ohio First Team and was named as the Player of the Year. Ohio Gatorade Player of the Year, and the OHSBCA Player of the Year. Petty led the Wildcats to two State Final Four appearance in 1998 and 2000. He was later added to the Chalker Athletic Hall of Fame, along with the 1998 State Finalist Team.

== Professional career ==
Upon graduation, Petty declared for the 2000 MLB draft, instead of joining the Louisville Cardinals, who he previously committed to. He was selected with the 48th overall pick in the second round by the Detroit Tigers. He was later traded to the Milwaukee Brewers in 2003, as a part of a trade for Alex Sanchez. Petty was never called up into the majors and spent his 5-year career in the MiLB

=== Gulf Coast League Tigers ===
In June 2000, Petty was drafted 48th overall by the Detroit Tigers, he was assigned to the Gulf Coast League Tigers shortly after. In his rookie season, Petty achieved a win-loss record of 2-3 while playing in 9 games and started 7 of those. Petty scored 18 runs off 31 hits. He was promoted to the Oneonta Tigers in 2001 for a one game. In 2001, Petty achieved a win-loss record of 6–0, appearing in 12 games and starting in 10, while scoring 16 runs off 41 hits.

=== West Michigan Whitecaps ===
In April 2002, Petty was promoted to the Class A West Michigan Whitecaps, where he achieved a win-loss record of 15–10, starting in all 28 games. Petty scored 73 runs off 155 hits and 4 home runs.

=== High Desert Mavericks/Lakeland Tigers ===
In April 2003, Petty was assigned to the High Desert Mavericks. With the Mavericks, Petty went 0–10, starting 16 of 17 games, scoring 76 runs off 112 hits and 14 home runs. He was later assigned to the Lakeland Tigers, where he went 3–4, starting 10 games, and scored 35 runs off 66 hits and 3 home runs, he finished the 2003 season with a 3–14 win-loss record, 111 hits off 178 hits and 17 home runs, which would be his career best.

=== Indepenent leagues and retirement ===
Petty later played for indepenent leagues such as the Canadian-American League and Frontier League in 2005. He started in 5 games combined for both leagues and retired shortly after.
