= Southington, Ohio =

- Unincorporated community
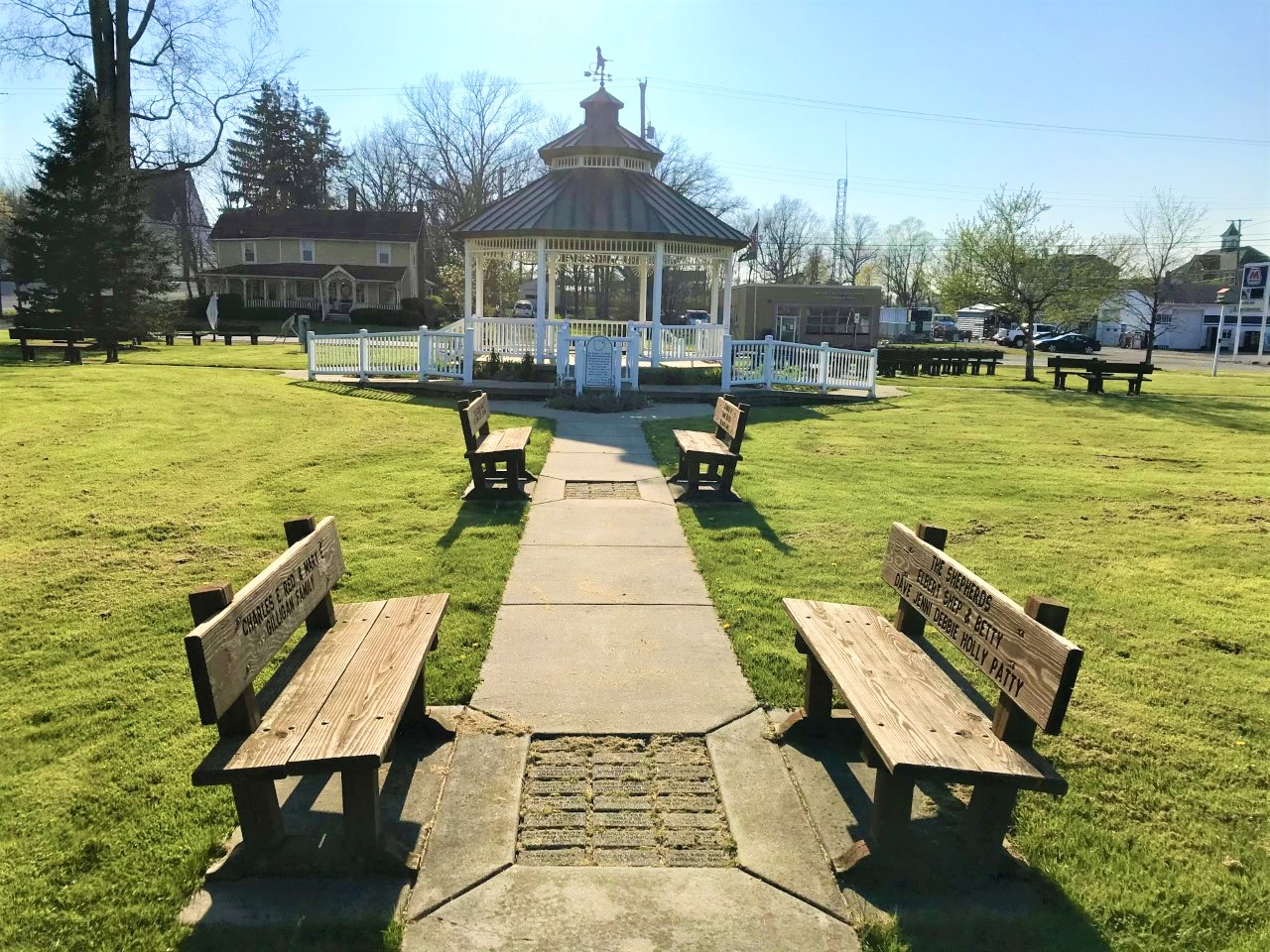
- Southington Park

- Location within Ohio
- Country: United States
- State: Ohio
- County: Trumbull
- Township: Southington
- Elevation: 892 ft (272 m)

Population
  - Total: 3,717 (2,023)
- Time zone: UTC-5 (Eastern (EST))
  - Summer (DST): UTC-4 (EDT)
- ZIP code: 44470
- Area codes: 234/330
- GNIS feature ID: 1065360

Southington is an unincorporated community in central Southington Township, Trumbull County, Ohio, United States. It lies at the intersection of U.S. Route 422 with State Route 305 and has a post office with the ZIP code 44470. It is part of the Youngstown–Warren metropolitan area.

== History ==
A post office called Southington has been in operation since 1826. The community takes its name from Southington Township, which was named after the town of the same name in Connecticut.

== Education ==
Children in Southington are served by the Southington Local School District. The district has one K-12 building south of Southington, administered as three separate schools:

- Southington Elementary School – grades K-5
- Southington Middle School – grades 6-8
- Chalker High School – grades 9-12

== Notable people ==
- Chad Petty, former MLB player for the Detroit Tigers
- Mike Tyson, former professional boxer purchased and lived in a mansion in Southington from 1989-1999
- Rick Badanjek, former NFL player for the Atlanta Falcons and Washington Redskins
