= Nelson Township, Portage County, Ohio =

Township in Ohio, US

Nelson Township
- Civil township
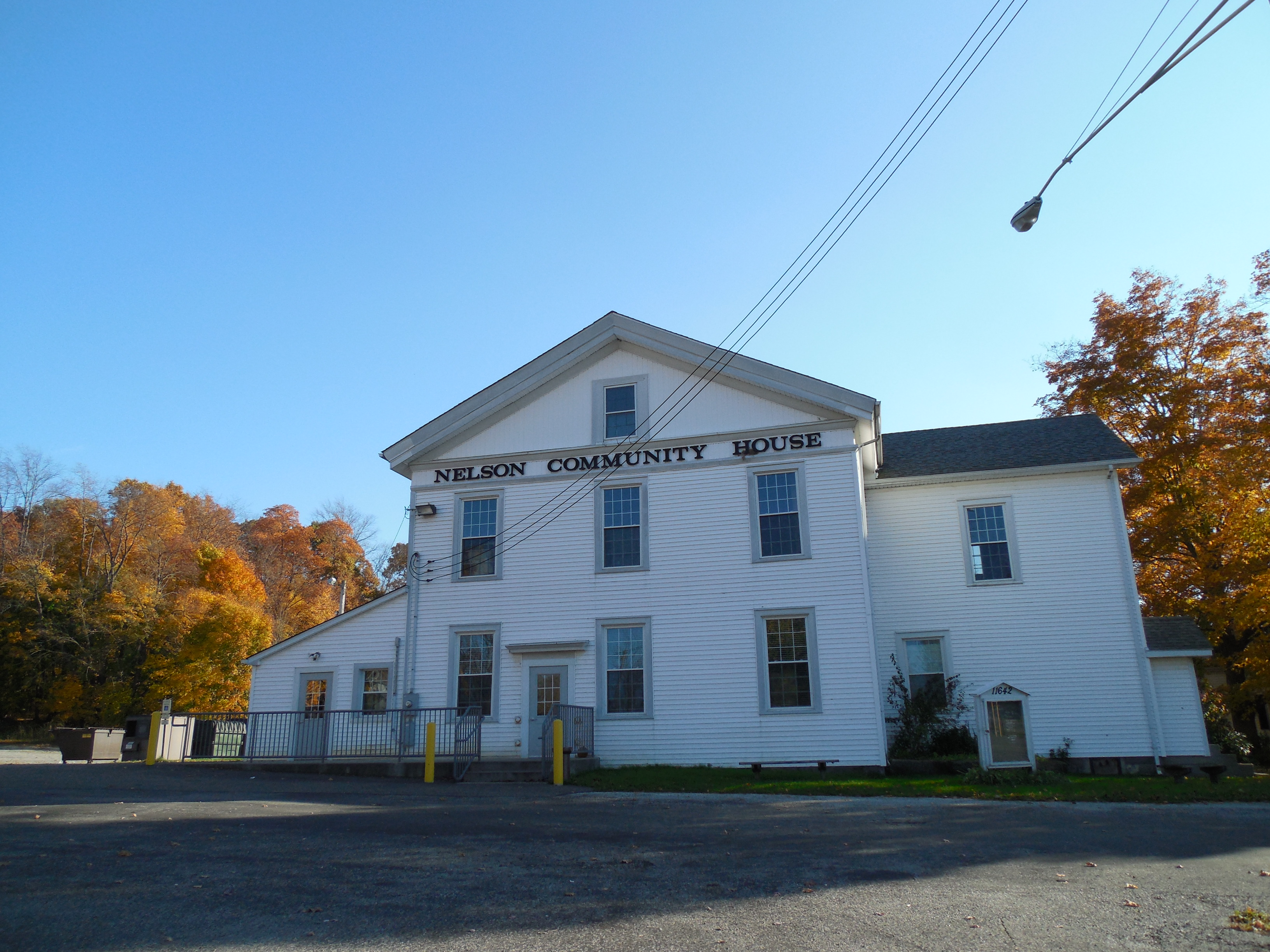
- The former Nelson Academy is now a community center
- Coordinates: 41°18′37″N 81°3′3″W
- Country: United States
- State: Ohio
- County: Portage

Area
  - Total: 24.7 sq mi (64 km^{2})
  - Land: 24.7 sq mi (64 km^{2})
  - Water: 0.0 sq mi (0 km^{2})
- Elevation: 1,050 ft (320 m)

Population (2020)
  - Total: 3,101
  - Density: 125.5/sq mi (48.5/km^{2})
- Time zone: UTC-5 (Eastern (EST))
  - Summer (DST): UTC-4 (EDT)
- ZIP code: 44231
- Area codes: 330, 234
- FIPS code: 39-53858
- GNIS feature ID: 1086833
- Website: https://nelsontwpoh.gov/

Nelson Township is one of the eighteen townships of Portage County, Ohio, United States. The 2020 census found 3,101 people in the township.

== Geography ==
Located in the northeastern corner of the county, it borders the following other townships and municipalities:

- Parkman Township, Geauga County - north
- Farmington Township, Trumbull County - northeast corner
- Southington Township, Trumbull County - east
- Braceville Township, Trumbull County - southeast corner
- Windham Township - south
- Hiram Township - west
- Troy Township, Geauga County - northwest corner

Most of the village of Garrettsville was formed from southwestern Nelson Township.

Formed from the Connecticut Western Reserve, Nelson Township covers an area of 25 square miles (65 km^{2}).

== Name and history ==
Nelson Township was organized in 1817. The name most likely is a transfer from Nelson, New York. It is the only Nelson Township statewide.

== Culture ==
Nelson Township is the site of Nelson Kennedy Ledges State Park, a 167 acres (68 ha) park featuring several rock formations that includes hiking trails, waterfalls, and picnicking areas. Also in the township is the Nelson Ledges Road Course hosts motorcycle and sports car racing events. Nelson has hosted many music festivals at Nelson Ledges Quarry Park from 1972–Present

== Government ==
The township is governed by a three-member board of trustees, who are elected in November of odd-numbered years to a four-year term beginning on the following January 1. Two are elected in the year after the presidential election and one is elected in the year before it. There is also an elected township fiscal officer, who serves a four-year term beginning on April 1 of the year after the election, which is held in November of the year before the presidential election. Vacancies in the fiscal officership or on the board of trustees are filled by the remaining trustees.
