= Trumbull Career and Technical Center =

Location
- 528 Educational Hwy NW; Warren, Ohio 44483; United States
- 41.2806°N 80.8249°W

Information
- School type: Public, Vocational
- Established: 1978
- Superintendent: Jason Gray
- NCES School ID: 390516304091
- Dean: Rachel Rankin
- Faculty: 74.00 (on an FTE basis)
- Grades: 9–12
- Enrollment: 948 (2024–25)
- Student to teacher ratio: 12.81
- Website: www.tctchome.com

Trumbull Career and Technical Center is a public vocational high school and adult education center located in Champion Heights, Ohio, United States, near Warren. The school serves students all public high schools throughout Trumbull County, Ohio.

== History ==
The Trumbull Career and Technical Center (TCTC) opened in 1978 and serves students grades 9–12. Students in grades 11-12 are enrolled in programs of their choice, while students in grades 9-12 are enrolled through their Early Innovators Academy program. Its Adult Education program began in January 1979. TCTC focuses on the "three Es", Enrolled, Enlisted and Employed, which is the school's goal for students graduating high school.

Trumbull Career and Technical Center, originally named Trumbull County Joint Vocational School (TCJVS) from its opening in 1978, until it was renamed in 2000. Schools like Warren G. Harding joined the JVS in 1992, followed by McDonald, Lordstown, Niles and Mineral Ridge in 2002. Today it serves 20 public high schools in Trumbull County.

In the Fall of 2021, TCTC announced the addition of their new Early Innovators Academy beginning the 2022–23 school year. The program served ninth and tenth grade students, which focuses on career exploration and STEM courses.

In December 2022, due to declining enrollment, TCTC announced they would be cutting Airforce ROTC, one of their long-time programs. The school announced they were not accepting new 11th grade students for the 2023–24 school year. The decision came following the retirement of their program instructor, Col. John Miller, and the program ended following the 2023–24 school year. The new Aviation and Drone Academy took its place in 2025.

In 2025, TCTC expanded their school with the construction of a new Industrial Training Center, which helps job-ready graduates find work for in demand positions, the new addition was opened in the Fall of 2026.

== Programs offered ==
Trumbull Career and Technical currently offers 27 tech programs as of the 2025-26 school year:

- App and Web Development
- Auto Collision Technology
- Auto Services Technology
- Aviation and Drone Technology
- Biotechnology
- Construction Technology
- Cosmetology
- Culinary Arts Academy
- Dental Assisting
- Digital Marketing and Management
- Early Innovators Academy
- Education and Family Services
- Electrical Technology
- Engineering Technology
- Equestrian Studies
- Exercise Science and Sports Medicine
- Fire and EMS Academy
- HVAC-R
- Industrial Technology
- Interactive Multimedia
- Job Training
- Landscape Architecture
- Power Equipment Mechanics
- Pre-Nursing: Pharmacy Tech
- Pre-Nursing: Phlebotomy Tech
- Veterinary Science
- Visual Design and Imaging
- Welding

== Work-based learning ==
Students at the vocational high school are allowed to assist employers and obtain work-based learning hours. Students are permitted to leave school early to attend a job related to their program of study, students are expected to accumulate 250 hours of work-based learning

== Career technical student organization programs ==
TCTC offers career technical student organizations (CTSO), which are extracurricular groups, dependent on the program of choice. Students in these groups compete in state and national championships, as well as local, regional and state office positions. The organizations offered are:

- Business Professionals of America (BPA)
- Future Farmers of America (FFA)
- SkillsUSA
