= Leland L. Summers =

American consulting engineer (1871–1927)

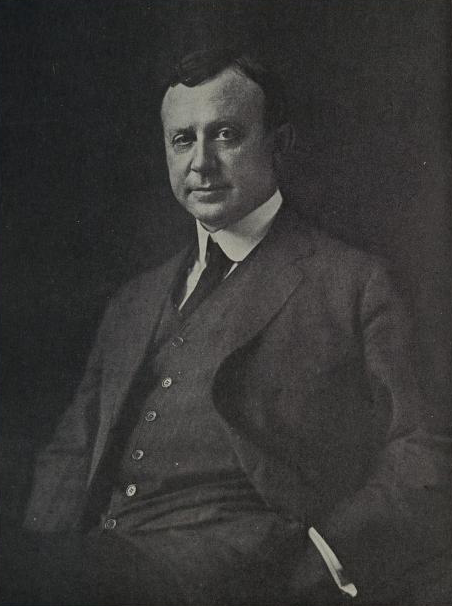
- Summers in a 1923 publication
- Born: Leland Laflin Summers; March 6, 1871; Cleves, Ohio, U.S.
- Died: March 10, 1927 (aged 56); Whitestone, Queens, Long Island, New York, U.S.
- Resting place: Woodstock, New York, U.S.
- Occupation: Consulting Engineer
- Spouse: Eve Brodlique Summers (m. 1899–1927)
- Children: 2

Leland Laflin "Lee" Summers (March 6, 1871 – March 10, 1927) was an American consulting engineer. As an expert on both military technology and chemical manufacturing, he worked as an advisor for the War Industries Board during World War I and served as their representative in Europe.

== Biography ==
Leland Laflin Summers was born in Cleves, Ohio, on March 6, 1871, to Emma (née Porter) and Charles H. Summers. His family moved to the Chicago area, where he graduated from Highland Park High School in 1886. Summers then received private instruction in mathematics, physics and engineering before taking a job as an assistant electrician with the Western Union Telegraph Company in 1889. After three years, he took a job as an electrician with the Postal Telegraph Cable Company.

In 1894, Summers returned to Chicago to set up a practice as a consulting engineer. Starting from his work experience in electrical engineering, he expanded his expertise into chemical, mechanical and hydraulic engineering. Summers was awarded twenty-seven U.S. patents between March 1901 and March 1926.

In 1911, Summers began to learn about military technology. This ranged from the chemical processes and raw materials used to produce high explosives to the mechanical engineering of guns. Summers took a special interest in Germany, where the synthetic chemical industry was more established than in America. So extensive was his knowledge that, in 1915 during a meeting with British artillery officers, Royal Marine general Leonard Thales Pease mistakenly assumed that he was a retired American artillery officer.

In 1914, Summers moved his engineering practice from Chicago to New York City. From 1915 to 1917, he was an advisor to J.P. Morgan & Co. on the munitions market. Among those he advised there was Edward R. Stettinius. In 1917, Summers became an advisor to Bernard Baruch and followed him onto the War Industries Board. He supervised both the explosives and the chemicals work of the Board until March F. Chase and Charles H. MacDowell arrived in Washington, D.C., to assume those two respective responsibilities. In 1918, Summers was sent to Europe to represent the Board in discussions with the Allied European munitions industry. In 1919, he served as technical advisor to the American Commission to Negotiate Peace in Paris.

After the war, Summers was made an officer of the Legion of Honour by France, a commander of the Order of the Crown by Belgium and an officer of the Order of the Crown of Italy. In 1923, he was awarded the Distinguished Service Medal by the War Department.

Summers served as an expert witness for the plaintiffs in the 1924–1926 patent infringement suit of William P. Deppe and the Deppe Motors Corporation against the General Motors Corporation.

== Personal ==
On April 4, 1899, Summers married Chicago journalist Eve Hadday Brodlique in London, Ontario. On December 3, 1900, their first child, Lesley, died in Chicago at the age of seven months. Their second child, Llewelyn Leland Brodlique Summers (September 25, 1903 – March 21, 1948), married Margaret Grace Shotwell, the daughter of Columbia University history professor James T. Shotwell. Lee and Eve Summers had one granddaughter.

On March 10, 1927, Summers died at his home "Summerslea" in Whitestone, Queens. Among those who attended his funeral service were Bernard Baruch, Hamlin Garland, Alexander Legge and Lorado Taft. His remains were interred in Woodstock, New York.
