= Ollie Josephine Prescott Baird Bennett =

US Army officer and physician (1874–1957)

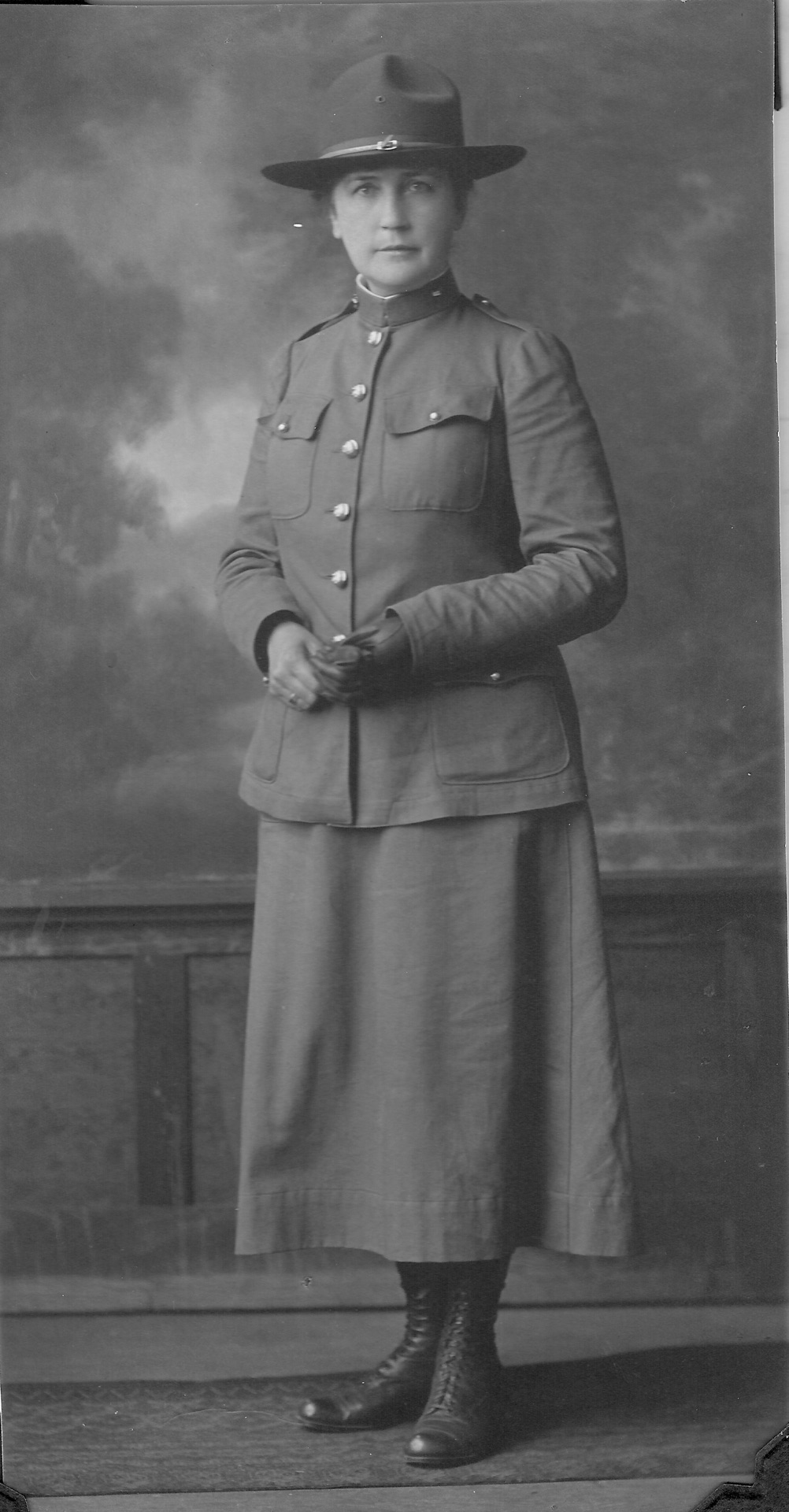
- Ollie Josephine Prescott Baird Bennett
- Born: March 27, 1874; Decatur, Illinois, US
- Died: February 4, 1957 (aged 82); Alexandria, Virginia, US
- Burial place: Arlington National Cemetery
- Children: 3
- Military career
- Branch: United States Army
- Service years: 1918
- Rank: First lieutenant
- Conflicts: World War I

Ollie Josephine Prescott Baird Bennett (March 27, 1874 – February 4, 1957) was an American physician, She was one of the first five women medical doctors to serve in the U.S. Army Medical Corps and as a first lieutenant in World War I. She instructed more than three hundred nurses and enlisted men in the administration of anesthesia at Camp McClellan, Alabama and served from May 1, 1918, to October 5, 1918.

== Early life ==
Ollie Josephine Prescott Baird Bennett was born in Decatur, Macon County, Illinois, to John and America Stackhouse. She graduated from University of Pittsburgh and Boston Medical School.

== World War I ==
Ollie Josephine Prescott Baird was the first female medical officer commissioned in the U.S. Army. Upon joining the army she was sent to an anesthesia course at the Mayo Clinic in Rochester, Minnesota. She was one of three contract physician anesthetists who served stateside. Mary Botsford and Dolores Piñero were the other women.

Baird was assigned to Fort McClellan, near Anniston, Alabama, where she instructed nurses and enlisted men in how to dispense anesthesia. She was also in charge of anesthesia for two operating rooms and gave anesthesia to five to seven patients every day. She designed her own uniform because the U.S. Army did not have uniforms for female physicians. Baird later stated that she was instructed not to wear insignia, but the commanding officer of the hospital gave her permission to wear a cord on her hat denoting lieutenant.

Following her military service, she was appointed to the War Industries Board.

== Personal life ==
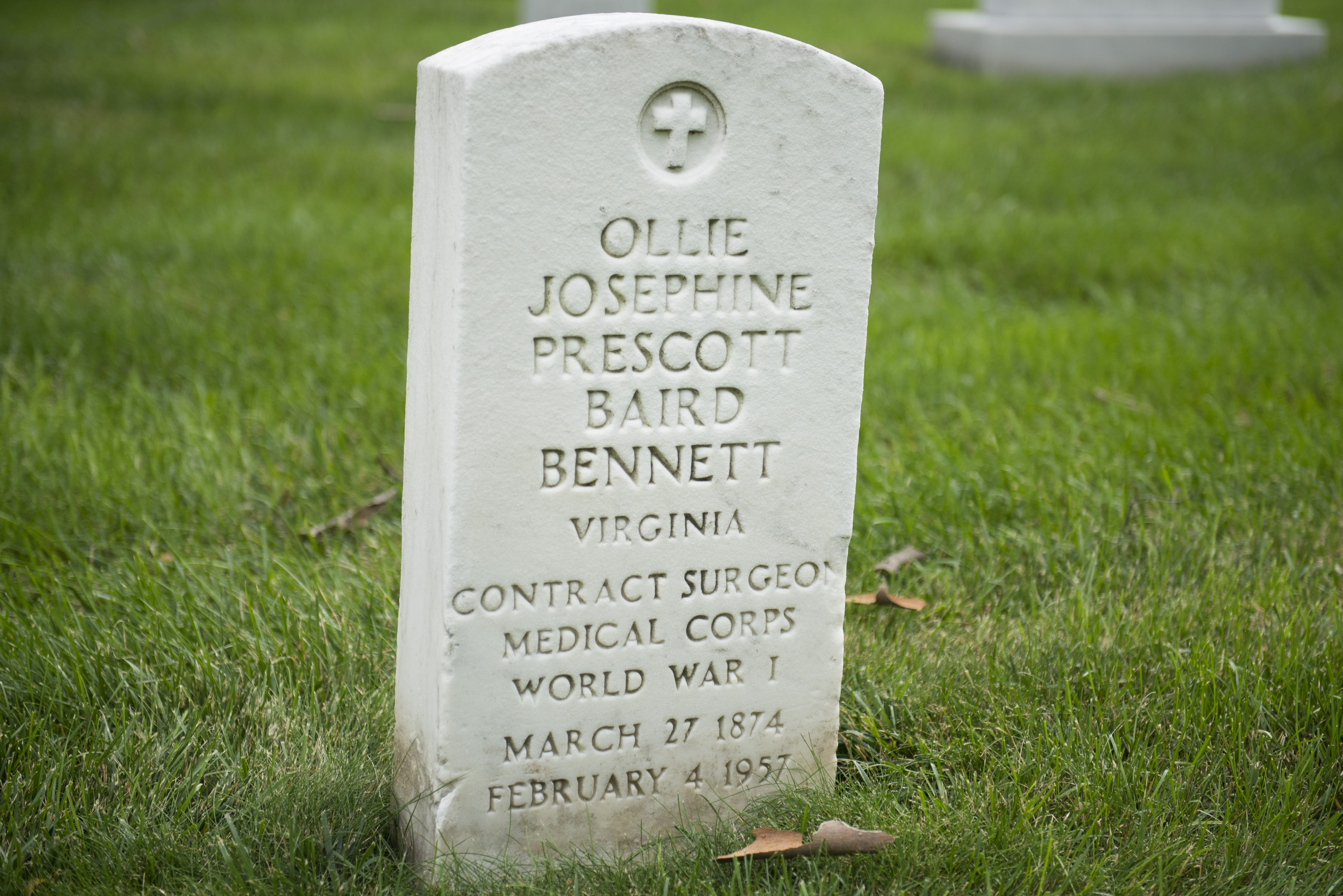
Grave at Arlington National Cemetery

Ollie Josephine Stackhouse married George L. Prescott on July 15, 1889, in Chicago, Cook County, Illinois. She had one daughter by this marriage, Olive, Mrs. E.W. Digges. On July 3, 1909, she married William F. Baird in Boston, Massachusetts and had two children. She was twice widowed. On February 4, 1934, she married Christopher C. Bennett.

Dr. Bennett was active in her community. In 1928, she joined the Mary Washington Chapter of the Daughters of the American Revolution (DAR). She was a charter member of the Women's City Club, and was a member of the Washington Branch of the Association of the American University Women's Club, the Maryland Historical Society, the Association for the Preservation of Virginia Antiquities, the National Genealogy Society, the Order of the Eastern Star, and the National Presbyterian Church. Genealogy and historical research were her hobbies.

Ollie Josephine Prescott Baird Bennett died on February 4, 1957, in Alexandria, Virginia and was interred at Arlington National Cemetery, in Arlington, Virginia.
