= R. V. Norris =

American mining engineer (1864–1928)

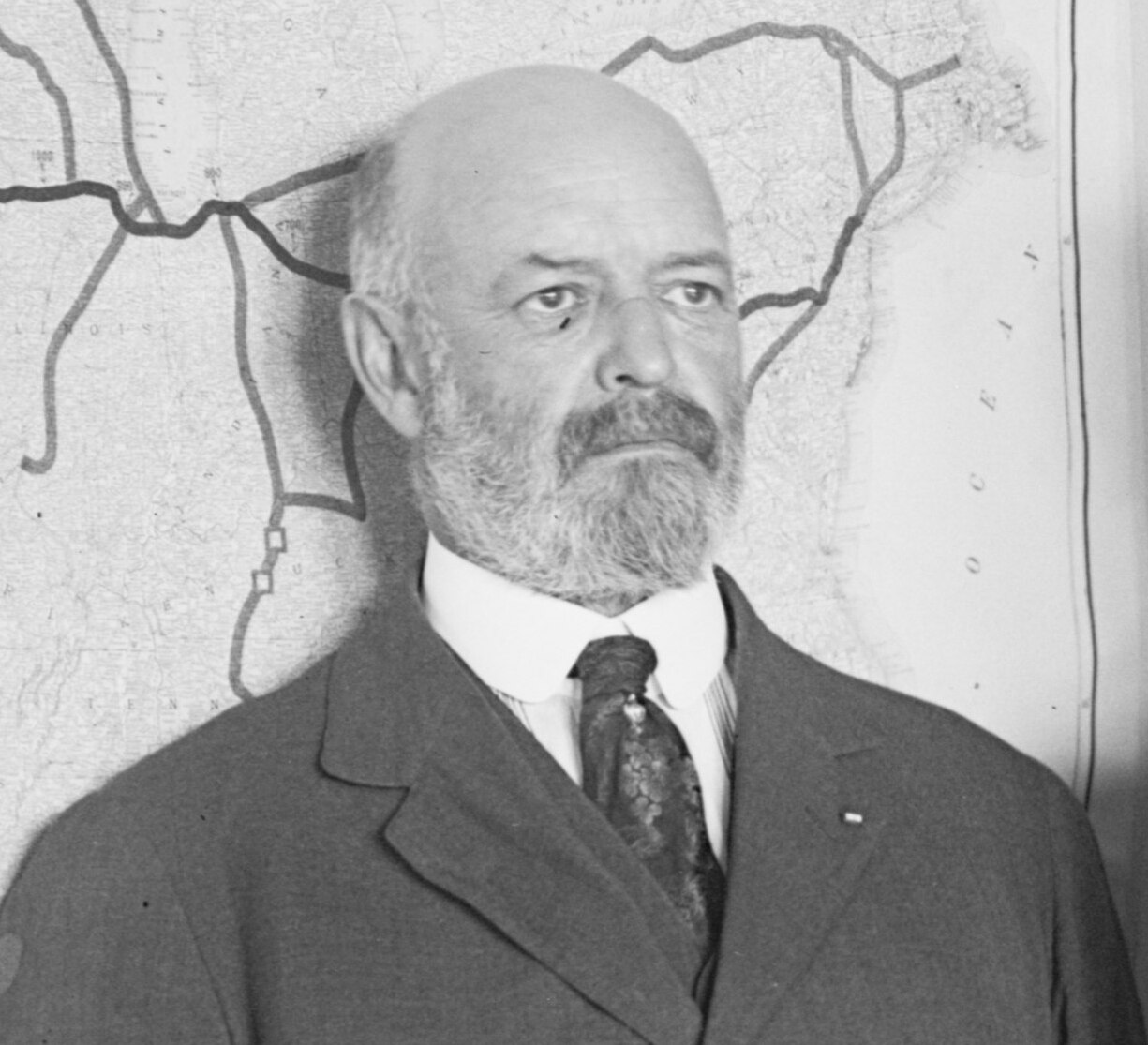
- Born: Robert Van Arsdale Norris; May 2, 1864; Newark, New Jersey, U.S.
- Died: April 20, 1928 (aged 63); Wilkes-Barre, Pennsylvania, U.S.
- Resting place: Forty Fort Cemetery
- Education: Columbia School of Mines (EM)
- Occupations: Engineer; consultant
- Spouse: Esther Wadhams Shoemaker (m. 1893)
- Children: 3
- Relatives: William Bradford

Robert Van Arsdale Norris (May 2, 1864 – April 20, 1928) was an American mining engineer and consultant.

== Early life ==
Robert Van Arsdale Norris was born on May 2, 1864, in Newark, New Jersey, to Mary Latimer (née Ruxton) and Thomas Baldwin Norris. He was descended from governor William Bradford. He graduated from the Collegiate School. He graduated with a E.M. from Columbia School of Mines in 1885.

== Career ==
Following graduation, Norris was an assistant instructor in mining and surveying at the Columbia School of Mines. He then was inspector of dredging and a chemist for the federal government. In June 1886, Norris was assistant engineer of coal mines for Susquehanna Coal Company, part of the Pennsylvania Railroad Company. In 1893, he was promoted to principal assistant engineer. In 1900, he was promoted to chief engineer. He remained there until 1904 and then worked in private practice. He consulted for a variety of large coal companies. He lectured at Harvard University and was graduate lecturer at Columbia University. He was senior member of his consulting engineering firm R. V. Norris & Co. During World War I, he was an engineer with the United States Fuel Administration. In September 1918, he was selected as a member of the price-fixing commission of the War Industries Board, representing the Fuel Administration. He was an inspector of the Markle Banking & Trust Company skyscraper in the Hazleton area when it was built.

Norris was a member of the American Institute of Mining and Metallurgical Engineers, American Society of Civil Engineers, American Society of Mechanical Engineers, Canadian Mining Institute, the U.S. Chamber of Commerce, the Wilkes-Barre Chamber of Commerce and the Columbia School of Mines Alumni Association.

== Personal life ==
Norris married Esther Wadhams Shoemaker of Wilkes-Barre, Pennsylvania on June 7, 1893. They had three children, Robert V. Jr., Jane and Esther. He was a member of the Cosmos Club and Chevy Chase Club in Washington, D.C. He was a member of St. Stephen's Church.

Norris died on April 20, 1928, at his home on South Franklin Street in Wilkes-Barre. He was buried in Forty Fort Cemetery.

== Awards ==
Norris received an honorary Master of Science in 1914. In 1920, he received the triennial medal from the Columbia School of Mines class of 1885 for his work with the Fuel Administration.
