= Food and Fuel Control Act =

1917 U.S. law establishing agencies to conserve food and fuel for the WWI war effort

- Other short titles: Lever Food Act
- Long title: An Act to provide further for the national security and defense by encouraging the production, conserving the supply, and controlling the distribution of food products and fuel.
- Nicknames: Lever Act
- Enacted by: the 65th United States Congress
- Effective: August 10, 1917

Citations
- Public law: [Link is broken 65-41]
- Statutes at Large: 40 Stat. 276

Legislative history
- Introduced in the House as H.R. 4961 by Asbury Lever (D-SC) on June 23, 1917; Passed the House on July 21, 1917 (81-6); Passed the Senate on July 23, 1917 (51-8); Reported by the joint conference committee on August 2, 1917; agreed to by the House on August 3, 1917 (360-0) and by the Senate on August 8, 1917 (66-7); Signed into law by President Woodrow Wilson on August 10, 1917

The Food and Fuel Control Act, Pub. L. 65–41, 40 Stat. 276, enacted August 10, 1917, also called the Lever Act or the Lever Food Act was a World War I era US law that among other things created the United States Food Administration and the United States Fuel Administration, as well as the Price Fixing Committee of the War Industries Board. The three agencies set fixed prices during World War I.

== Legislative history ==
The act was a very controversial piece of legislation. The act was sponsored by Rep. Asbury F. Lever, a Democrat from South Carolina. President Wilson urged its passage as a wartime emergency measure. Some opposed the authority that would rest in the person of the "Food Administrator." Others opposed language that empowered the president to limit or prohibit the use of agricultural products in the production of alcoholic beverages, thereby establishing a form of national prohibition. Senators proposed alternatives, including a prohibition on the production of whiskey alone for the duration of the war. Republican Senator Henry Cabot Lodge objected to the language that authorized the president to "use any agency or agencies, to accept the services of any person without compensation, to cooperate with any person or persons in relation to the processes, methods, activities of and for the production manufacture, procurement, storage, distribution, sale, marketing, pledging, financing, and consumption of necessaries which are declared to be affected with a public interest." Wilson also had to fight off the proposal of Massachusetts Republican Senator John W. Weeks to establish instead a Joint Committee on the Conduct of the War.

George W. Anderson, U.S. attorney and special assistant to the attorney general, urged the necessity of the act to pass, to the House Agricultural Committee at the time, declaring:

"Something must be done. That social and political upheaval is threatened cannot be denied or disregarded. I see signs of it. Anyone with his ears to the ground knows it"

Its official name was "An Act to Provide Further for the National Security and Defense by Encouraging the Production, Conserving the Supply, and Controlling the Distribution of Food Products and Fuel" and became law on August 10, 1917. It banned the production of "distilled spirits" from any produce that was used for food.

In 1918, faced with complaints from farmers that the Food Administration created under the Act had set the minimum price of wheat too low, Congress passed an amendment increasing that level from $2.20 to $2.40 per bushel. The President's veto out of concerns about inflation and the impact on the British, is credited with producing disastrous results for Democrats in the 1918 elections in the states of the grain belt.

On August 18, 1919, after the end of hostilities, President Wilson asked Congress to extend the life of the Act to allow his administration to address widespread and dramatic increases in the prices of commodities. He requested amendments to include clothing and to set increased penalties for profiteering. Opponents delayed passage for months while berating the administration for its failure to control prices and then granted the authority the President requested in October. In the House of Representatives, the President's chief critic complained of the administration's priorities: "Where there is one man in a thousand who cares a rap about the League of Nations, there are nine hundred and ninety-nine who are vitally and distressingly concerned about the high cost of living." The Department of Justice launched 179 prosecutions under the amended Act in the first two months following its passage.

== Implementation ==
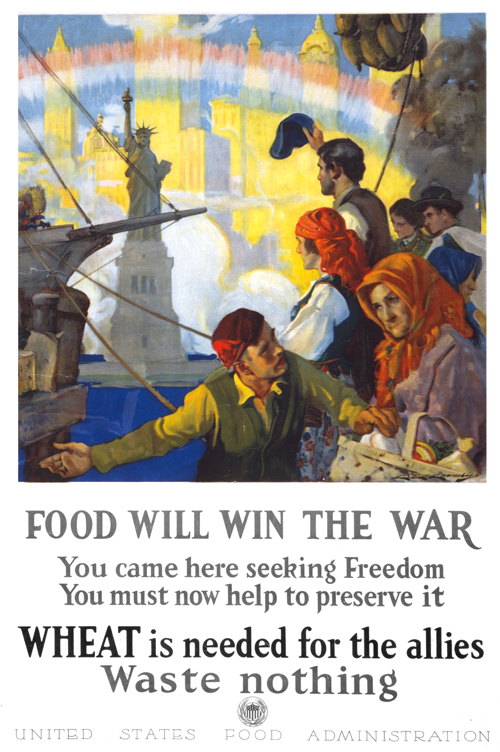
"Food will win the war" United States Food Administration poster

The Act, an emergency wartime measure, was designed to expire at the end of World War I or shortly thereafter. It created two agencies, the Food Administration and the Fuel Administration.

To head the Food Administration, the President named Herbert Hoover who had handled Belgian relief at the beginning of the war and had coordinated food and fuel supplies since May 1917 on Wilson's personal authority. As United States Food Administrator he had the authority to fix food prices, license distributors, coordinate purchases, oversee exports, act against hoarding and profiteering, and encourage farmers to grow more crops. He emphasized the needs of America's allies, both those under arms and the civilian populations, for American produce. He encouraged American households to consume less meat and bread.

Wilson issued a proclamation in January 1918 calling upon Americans to demonstrate their patriotism by following Hoover's guidelines. There were voluntary "meatless Tuesdays" and "sweetless Saturdays." Tuesdays and Saturdays were "porkless." Both Mondays and Wednesday would be "wheatless." Compliance was voluntary, though the baking industry, including hotels and restaurants, was limited to the production of war bread and rolls called "victory bread." Initially it was made from at least 5% of grains other than wheat and that amount increased to 20% by February 24. His agency asked households to pledge their support and some 13 million of 18 million did so. Hoover's call for the conservation of the nation's produce emphasized voluntary compliance:

The effectiveness of these rules is dependent solely upon the goodwill of, and the willingness to sacrifice by, the American people. In the last analysis, the success or failure of any plan such as that here outlined rests with the people. We are dependent upon the cooperation of the trades. We have but one police force – the American woman – and we depend upon her to organize in co-operation with our State and local Food Administrators to see that these rules are obeyed by that small minority who may fail. Part of the rules will be enforced under the Lever Food act; other parts are voluntary, and will depend for their success upon public sentiment. Our experience hitherto has shown a willingness of the vast majority of consumers, and a full co-operation of the trades, to undergo the self-sacrifice necessary to render such measures effective. The small minority who refuse to cooperate should not be allowed to defeat the nation's necessities.

Children were organized into the "United States School Garden Army." When eating apples, Boy Scouts were urged to be "patriotic to the core." Citizens were encouraged to grow "victory gardens" of vegetables in their backyards and vacant lots. Slogans like "By all means, save the beans" became popular. The Food Administration also fixed the price of a bushel of wheat, the price floor being $2 a bushel and the ceiling at $2.20. One of its posters said: "FOOD WILL WIN THE WAR; DON’T WASTE IT." By the end of 1918, about one-fourth of all American production was diverted to the war effort.

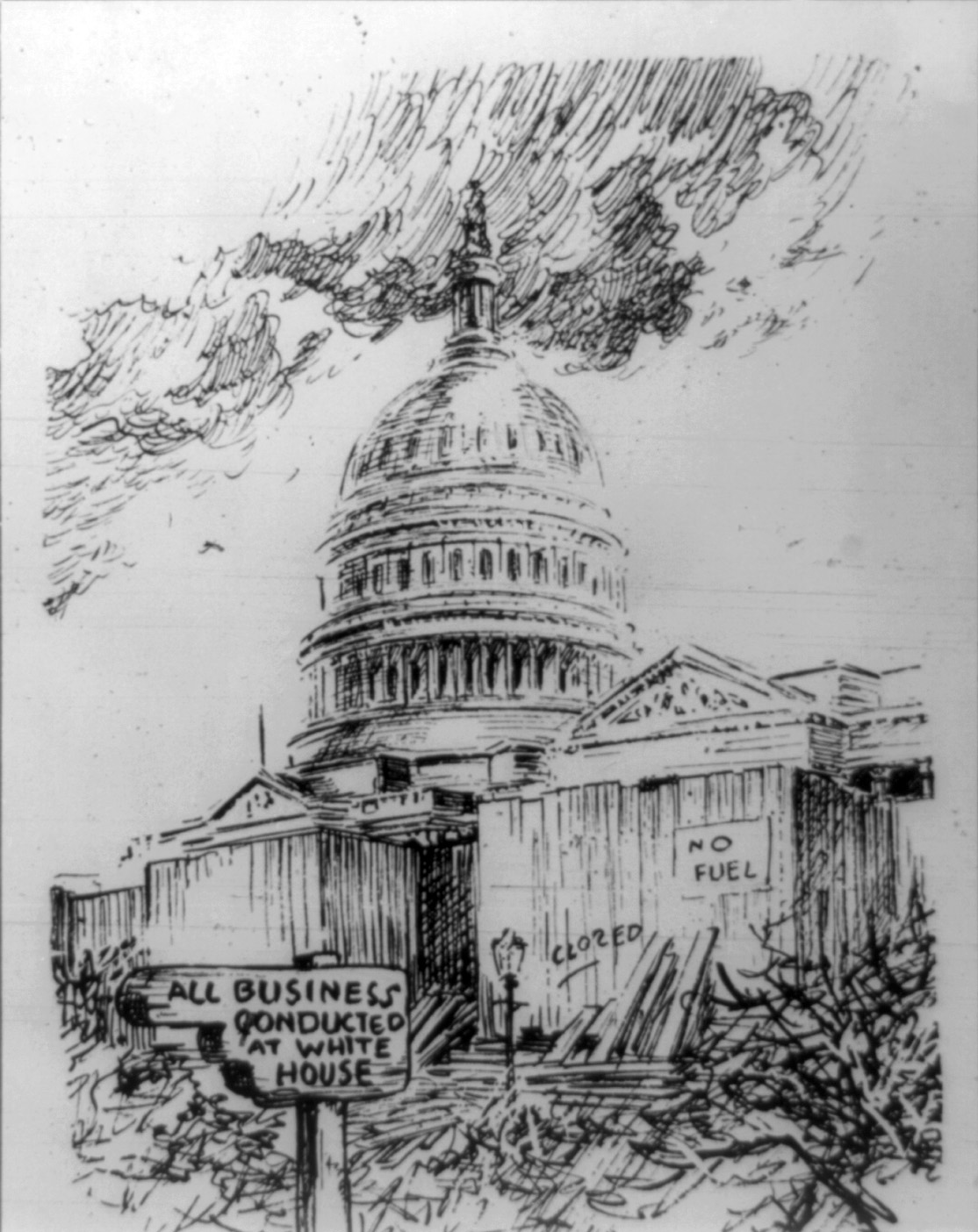
January 1918 editorial cartoon by Oscar Cesare showing the U.S. Capitol boarded up and signs reading, "Closed; no fuel; all business conducted at White House."

The Fuel Administration under Harry Garfield, the President of Williams College, directed efforts to save coal. Nonessential factories were closed, and the Federal government had complete control over all aspects of the coal industry including production, pricing, sale, shipment, and distribution. Although the Act also included oil and natural gas, it gave the government less authority over those energy sources and no ability to control the price of oil and gas. Copying the methods of the Food Administration, citizens were encouraged to save fuel with "gasless Sundays," "heatless Mondays," and "lightless nights."

Garfield's most dramatic action was an attempt to speed fuel to eastern ports where ships were idled for lack of fuel. On January 17, 1918, he order the closing of all factories east of the Mississippi. That accomplished his goal, but exposed the Wilson administration to criticism both from its usual opponents and members of the President's own party.

On February 4, 1918, Garfield announced rules to govern the distribution of fuel oil that defined priority classes starting with railroads, then exports to the American armed forces, exports to America's allies in the war, hospitals, and several other classes.

== Controversies ==
In November 1919, Attorney General A. Mitchell Palmer sought and won an injunction against a strike in the coal industry under the Act. He claimed the President authorized the action, following a meeting with the severely ill President Wilson in the presence of his doctor. Samuel Gompers, President of the American Federation of Labor, protested that President and members of his Cabinet had provided assurances when the Act was passed that it would not be used to prevent strikes by labor unions. He provided detailed accounts of his negotiations with representatives of the administration, especially Secretary of Labor William B. Wilson. He also argued that the end of hostilities, even in the absence of a signed treaty, should have invalidated any attempts to enforce the Act's provisions.

At one point Palmer asserted that the entire Cabinet had backed his request for an injunction. That infuriated Secretary of Labor Wilson who had opposed Palmer's plan and supported Gompers' view of the President's promises when the Act was under consideration. The rift between the Attorney General and the Secretary of Labor was never healed, which had consequences the next year when Palmer's attempts to deport radicals were frustrated by the Department of Labor.

Palmer used the Act again in April 1919 against 38 of the leaders of a walkout by railroad workers.

The amended Act's attempt to limit profits was found unconstitutional in February 1920 by a federal court that found its language "vague, indefinite, and uncertain." The Supreme Court struck down the provisions of the Act that allowed the Food Administrator to set maximum prices and fine those who violated the levels he set in 1921. That same year, the Supreme Court upheld the Act's imposition of rent control in the District of Columbia, which had not been repealed along with the bulk of the Act.

== Repeal ==
The work of the Fuel Administration ended in May 1919. The activities of the Food Administration declined quickly after the Armistice of 11 November 1918 and all but disappeared by July 1920.

The Act of August 10, 1917, as amended, was repealed along with a number of other authorized-for-wartime measures in a joint resolution of Congress on March 3, 1921 by effectively declaring the wartime emergency still in effect at the time as formally over.

Court cases brought under the Act, both before and after its repeal, continued to work their way through the courts.
