= Eve Brodlique Summers =

American journalist

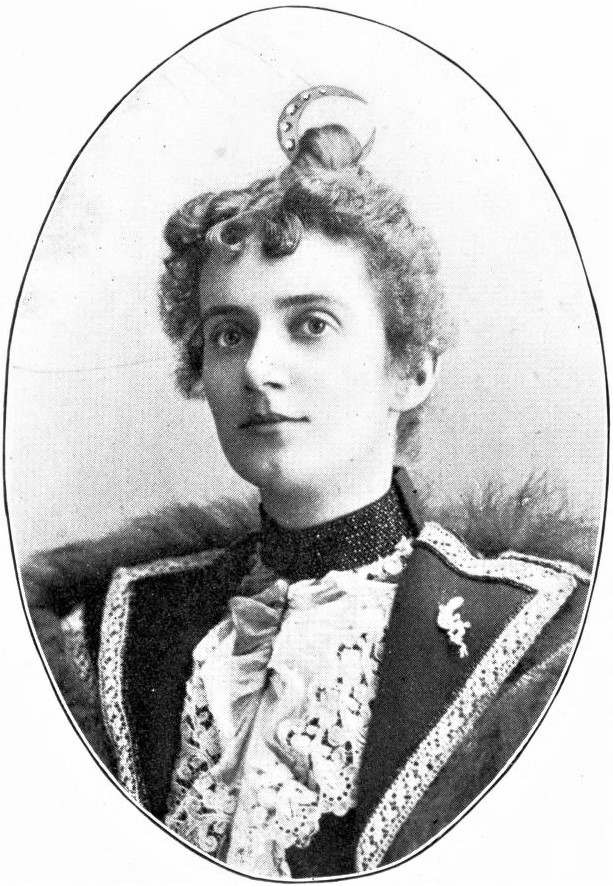
- Born: Eve Hadday Brodlique; 1867; Cornwall, England
- Died: 10 October 1949 (aged 81–82); Saugerties, New York
- Occupations: journalist; writer
- Spouse: Leland Laflin Summers (m. 1899; died 1927)
- Children: Llewelyn Leland Brodlique Summers
- Relatives: Jean Blewett (cousin)
- Writing career
- Pen name: "Willice Wharton"; "Peg Woffington"; "Evelyn"
- Language: English

Signature
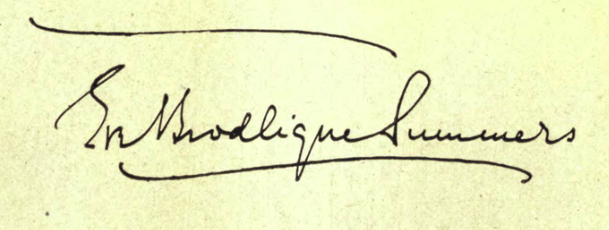

Eve Brodlique Summers (née, Brodlique; 1867 – 10 October 1949), known by her pen names Willice Wharton, Peg Woffington and Evelyn, was a British-born Canadian-American author and journalist. One of the best-known newspaper women in North America, she built up a national reputation with her rhymes and stories and worked in a variety of positions at papers including the Chicago Post and Chicago Times-Herald.

== Early life and education ==
Eve (sometimes, "Eva") Hadday Brodlique was born in Cornwall, England, 1867. (Note: Others record Canada as place of birth.) Her parents were Frederick Cornish Brodlique, and Elizabeth Hadday (or Haddy). There was one sibling, a sister, Clara Elizabeth Brodlique. Jean Blewett was Brodlique's cousin. The family emigrated to London, Ontario when Eve was young.

Brodlique was educated in Canada, England, and the United States.

== Career ==
Her professional career began while she was yet a school girl at her home in London, Ontario, from which place she sent occasional specials to the Toronto papers. Beginning when she was 17 years old, and using the pen name, "Willice Wharton", Brodlique was the special representative for the London Advertiser at the House of Commons at Ottawa, being the first and the only woman who did regular telegraphic political work from the Dominion Parliament. This work in the press gallery lasted for three sessions. Although holding decided political opinions of her own, she made unbiased reports, and was equally popular with the representatives of both parties.

When Brodlique thought about transferring her activities to the United States, she thought that New York City would be the place to continue her journalism career, but an opportunity came to travel with a friend to Chicago, and she took it. Brodlique arrived in Chicago in 1894, and started studying at the University of Chicago. Two years later, she became a writer at the Chicago Times-Herald, becoming its women's department editor, a post she held for a number of years. At the same time, she was writing for the Chicago Evening Post. In 1897, she represented the Chicago Times-Herald at the Diamond Jubilee of Queen Victoria in London, England. She was also a contributor to the Cosmopolitan, Munsey's, Frank Leslie's, and McClure's.

"I would rather be a poet than anything else in the world, and if I could have my heart's desire, it would be to live on the top of a mountain over-looking the sea, and enclosed in a pine forest, like the old fairy-tale heroines. Then I would have lots of cats and dogs and horses, would dream and read all I wanted to, and get away from the noise and grime, and the chatter of words." -Eve Brodlique, 1896

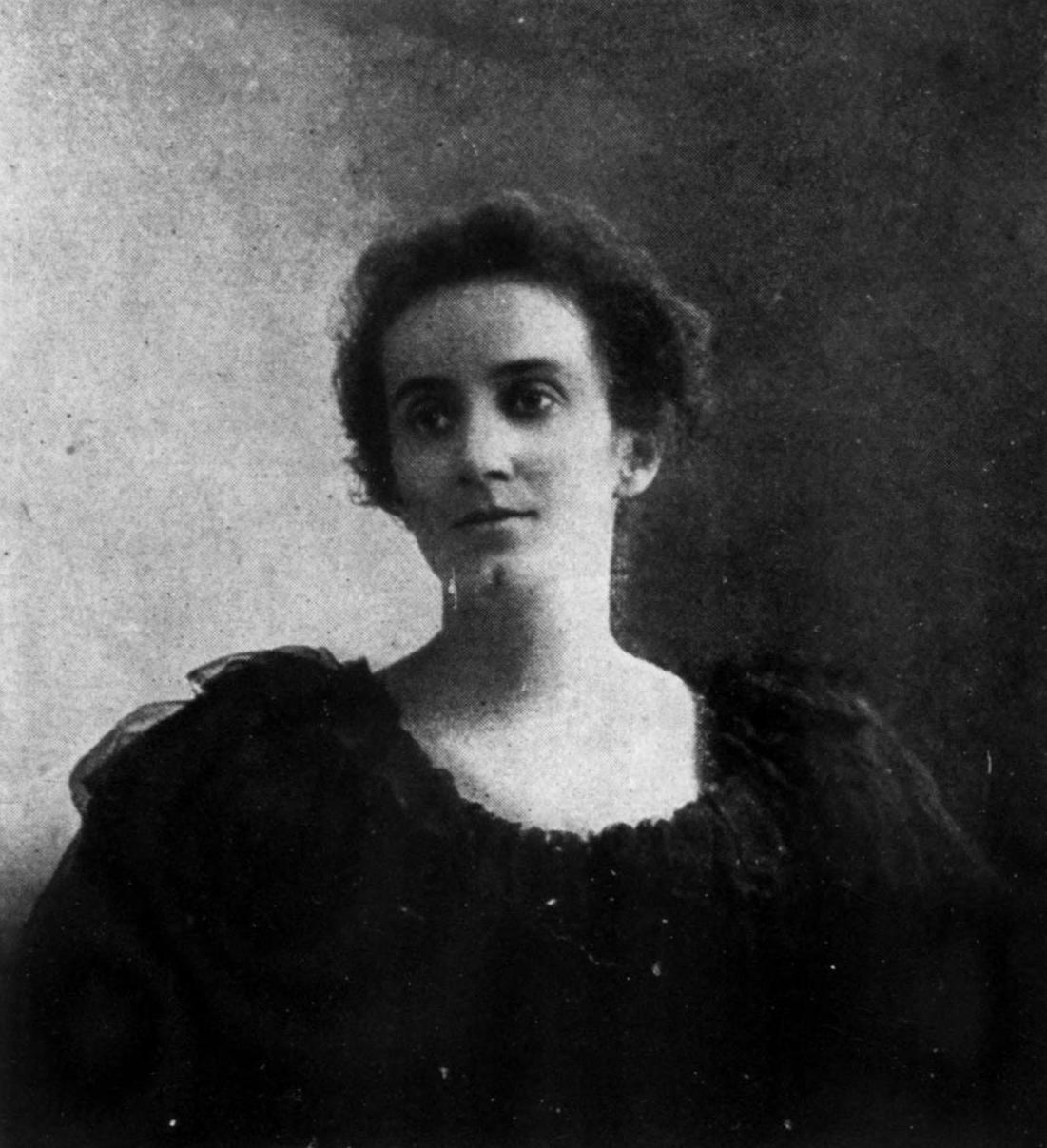
1897

Brodlique was successful writing editorials, specials, poems, romances, and plays. A Training School for Lovers, the title of her first play, was a one-act presentation of one woman's sacrifice of her heart's desire to secure the happiness of another woman. Her poems had a simplicity and directness of feeling. There was an under-current of sadness in her verses that seemed unnatural for one so young unless they understood how Brodlique had suffered: that she was the last of her name; that she had buried everyone in her family; and that she felt alone in the world. She also wrote a volume of short stories. Of her short stories, the most popular were her representations of life among the fisher-folk of rock-girt Cornwall. Of these stories, Blewett said:— "No one can hope to master Cornish humor or Cornish sentiment, to say nothing of Cornish dialect, who has not the birthright to a knowledge of these difficult things as has Eve Brodlique."

Brodlique was a member of the Chicago Woman's Club. In 1893, she served as corresponding secretary of the Woman's National Press League. In 1897, she was elected president of the Chicago Press League. Brodlique was one of the most versatile writers in the league. She could jump from politics to fashion, from prose to poetry, from humor to pathos, and write a dramatic criticism as well as an article on art. She was "Peg Woffington" of "The Matinee Girl" column in a popular afternoon paper, and once a week, "Evelyn" on fashions, and nearly every day, had about two columns on a bit of everything without a signature.

During the 1897 World's Fair, she belonged to the editorial staff of the Chicago Post, and kept to the fore the Canadian exhibit and the people from Canada who attended the fair. She also attended the Paris Peace Conference of 1919–1920.

== Personal life ==
Brodlique returned to Canada in August 1896, touring Quebec and Ontario.

On 4 April 1899 in London, Ontario, she married Leland Laflin Summers, consulting engineer of the Florence and Cripple Creek railroad company and the La Bella Mining company of Denver, Colorado. Afterwards, they lived in Denver. They had a son born in Chicago, Llewelyn Leland Brodlique Summers (1903–1948). In 1937, their son married Margaret Grace Shotwell, the daughter of Columbia University history professor James T. Shotwell.

Brodlique resided at "Summerslea", an estate on Long Island. She died in a sanitarium in Saugerties, New York, 10 October 1949. Burial was in Woodstock, New York.

== Selected works ==
=== Plays ===
- A Training School for Lovers, 1896
- A Tangled Web, 1897
- Rue, 1900
