= Herbert R. Moody =

American chemist and educator (1869–1947)

- Born: Herbert Raymond Moody; November 19, 1869; Chelsea, Massachusetts, U.S.
- Died: October 20, 1947 (aged 77); Vienna, Virginia, U.S.
- Education: Massachusetts Institute of Technology (BS); Columbia University (MA, PhD)
- Occupations: Chemist; educator; writer
- Years active: 1901–1941
- Spouse: Edna Wadsworth (m. 1895)

Herbert Raymond Moody (November 19, 1869 – October 20, 1947) was an American chemist, educator and writer. He was a professor at Massachusetts Institute of Technology, Hobart College and City College of New York. He was chief of the technical branch of the chemistry division of the War Industries Board from 1917 to 1918.

== Early life ==
Herbert Raymond Moody was born on November 19, 1869, in Chelsea, Massachusetts, to Mary Emily (née Sherman) and Luther Raymond Moody. He graduated with a Bachelor of Science from the Massachusetts Institute of Technology (MIT) in 1892. He graduated with a Master of Arts in 1900 and a PhD in 1901 from Columbia University. His dissertation was titled "Reactions at the Temperature of the Electric Arc".

== Career ==
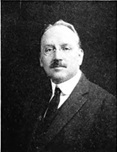
Professor Herbert Raymond Moody, Director of the Chemical Laboratories, CCNY (1925)

In 1892, Moody started teaching at MIT. He was a professor at Hobart College from 1901 to 1905. He then was head of the chemistry department at the City College of New York from 1922 to his retirement in 1938.

Moody was chief of the technical branch of the chemistry division of the War Industries Board from 1917 to 1918. He was assistant in the department of administration of the National Recovery Administration in 1934. He was chairman of the division of chemistry and chemical technology of the National Research Council from July 1936 to June 30, 1941.

Moody was a member of the American Chemical Society, London Chemical Society, Societe de Chimie Industrielle, Phi Beta Kappa and the Cosmos Club of Washington, D.C. He became a fellow of the American Institute of Chemists in 1924 and became a life member in 1939. He was chairman of the employment bureau of The Chemists' Club.

== Personal life ==
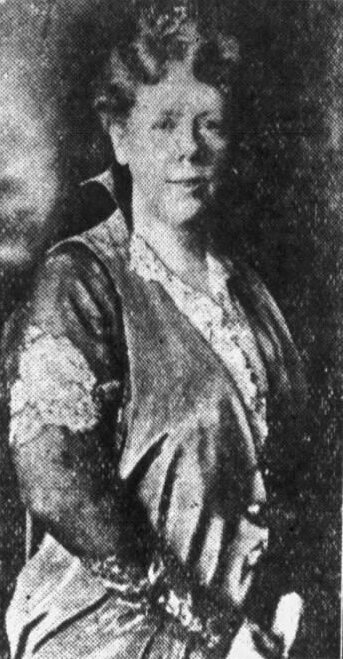
Portrait of Edna Wadsworth Moody in a 1923 paper

Moody married Edna Wadsworth, daughter of Mary Lorraine (née Lees) and Jesse Wadworth, of Chelsea on August 20, 1895. Following their marriage, they lived in Winsted, Connecticut. Following his retirement, he moved to Vienna, Virginia, spent time in Florida and summered in Sebago Lake, Maine. In his retirement, he gardened and woodworked.

Moody died on October 20, 1947, at his home in Vienna.

== Works ==
=== Publications ===
- Talbot, Henry P.; Moody, Herbert R. "On the Properties of Hydrogen Peroxide Solutions" (1892) Technology Quarterly and Proceedings of the Society of Arts.
- Moody, Herbert R. Chemistry of the Metals
- Moody, Herbert R. College Text of Quantitative Analysis
- Moody, Herbert R. Reactions at Temperature of Electric Arc

=== Patents ===
- Moody, Herbert Raymond (1923) "Hydrogenation and Production of Nonsludging Oils". U.S. Patent Number 1,601,406.
