= Farm Foundation =

American trust for agriculture

Farm Foundation is an organization set up as a trust in 1933 by Alexander Legge, with the goal of improving the economics of agriculture in the United States. It is based in Oak Brook, Illinois.

Henry C. Taylor was the first manage director. Today, the foundation engages in areas such as land conservation, sustainability, farmer health, new technologies, and education

== Details ==
Its headquarters are in Oak Brook, Illinois.

Farm Foundation was created in 1933 by Alexander Legge, the president of International Harvester, and former Illinois Governor Frank Orren Lowden. The organization hosts Forums, dialogues and conferences (both on its own and in conjunction with other entities, including the U.S. Department of Agriculture), publishes Issue Reports relating important agricultural topics to stakeholders involved in agriculture in North America, and helps build the next generation of successful agribusiness professionals through its Cultivator and Agricultural Scholars programs.
