= Herbert E. Peabody =

American businessman (died 1930)

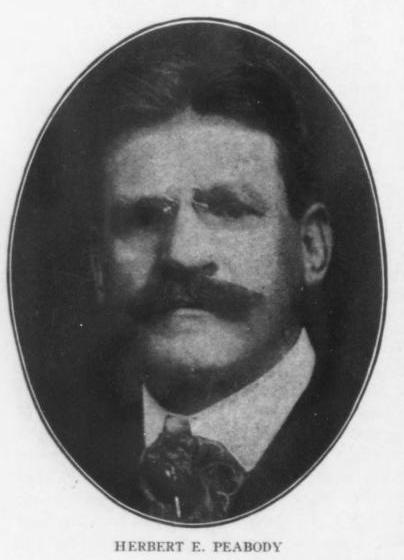
- Peabody in a 1918 publication
- Born: Wellesley, Massachusetts, U.S.
- Died: September 15, 1930 (aged 69); Manhattan, New York City, U.S.
- Occupation: Businessman

Herbert E. Peabody (died September 15, 1930) was an American businessman in the wool industry. He represented the industry in the War Industries Board in 1918.

== Early life ==
Herbert E. Peabody was born and educated in Wellesley, Massachusetts. He first worked as an office boy in the sales office of Ethan Allen Company in Boston.

== Career ==
In 1889, Peabody moved to New York City and became a salesman for Harding, Colby & Co. The following year the firm became Harding, Whitman & Co. and Peabody was head of the department selling Arlington serges. He continued working as a sales agent for mills, including Carolina Mills, the Ashaway Woolen Mills, the Shelbourne Mills and the Coronet Woolen Company. In 1916, he was elected president of the National Association of Woolen and Worsted Manufacturers (NAWM). In January 1918, he was elected secretary of the war service committee of wool manufacturers of the U.S. Chamber of Commerce. He resigned the presidency of NAWM and on June 1, 1918, he was selected to represent the wool industry in the War Industries Board as head of the woolen goods section of the textile and rubber division. In September 1918, Peabody stated that no wool was available for civilian goods. The woolen goods sections disbanded on December 21, 1918. Following the board, he returned to Shelbourne Mills as a selling agent. He did business with Albert M. Patterson under the firm name Patterson & Greenough up until October 1, 1922. He had a business on East 17th Street in Manhattan. He then became a sales manager of T. Guerin & Co. He resigned from T. Guerin & Co. on June 30, 1925.

Peabody was head of the National Textile Research Bureau for a few months before it became the Wool Institute. He was then appointed as field director. He helped form the uniform copy of order and was responsible for the wool industry's acceptance of rules in the arbitration of trade disputes without court litigation. He was a member of the Union League Club. He was associated with the Mutual Adjustment Bureau.

== Personal life ==
Around 1916, Peabody sold his house and lands in Shelbourne Mills. He owned a summer home in Setauket, New York. From a young age, he was interested in yachting.

Peabody died on September 15, 1930, aged 69, at his home on East 36th Street in Manhattan.

== Publications ==
- Peabody, Herbert E. "Problems in Woolen Industry Appear Many-Sided" Textile World (1926).
