= Charles H. MacDowell =

American chemist (1867–1954)

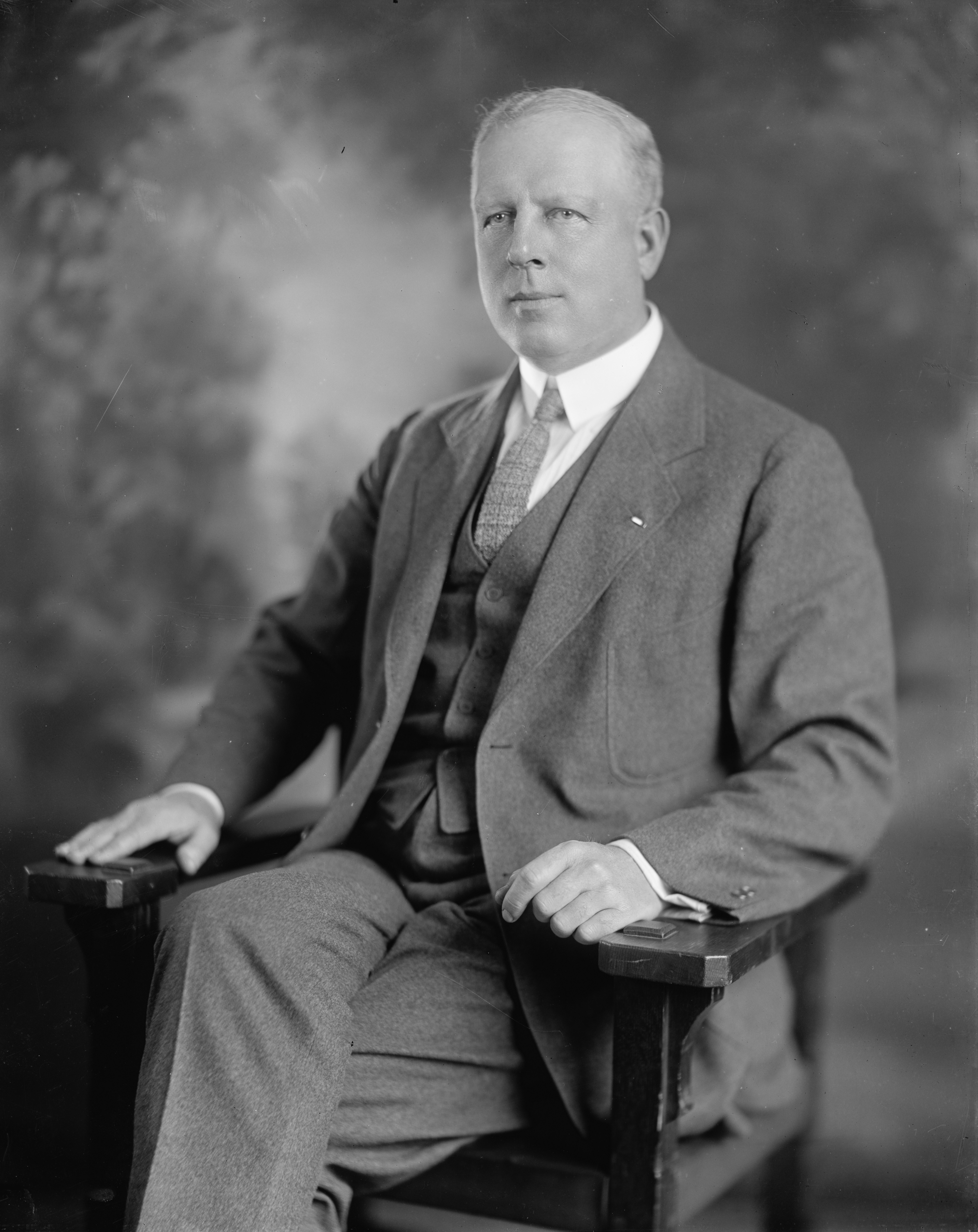
- MacDowell, c. 1905
- Born: Charles Henry MacDowell; October 21, 1867; Lewistown, Illinois, U.S.
- Died: March 4, 1954 (aged 86); Orlando, Florida, U.S.
- Resting place: Palm Cemetery
- Occupation: Chemist
- Spouse(s): Janet Borland (died 1929) Claire Leavitt (m. 1934)

Charles Henry MacDowell (October 21, 1867 – March 4, 1954) was an American chemist. He served as director of the chemical division of the War Industries Board. He was president of the Armour Fertilizer Company from 1909 to 1932.

== Early life ==
Charles Henry MacDowell was born on October 21, 1867, in Lewistown, Illinois. He worked as a printer's devil for the Fulton Democrat in Lewistown. He graduated from Illinois Wesleyan University with a degree in business. He also worked as a court reporter.

== Career ==
In 1887, MacDowell moved to Chicago and began working for Armour and Company as a back office stenographer. He worked as personal secretary and stenographer for Philip D. Armour. He was in charge of the company's exhibit at the World's Columbian Exposition in 1893. Following his study of the economics of the use of fertilizer in Europe and the United States from exhibits at the World's Fair, he asked Armour if he could develop a fertilizer side to the Armour business. Armour agreed and MacDowell was first tasked with developing a soap works. He served as the fertilizer department manager of Armour and Company from 1894 to 1909. In 1909, the Armour Fertilizer Company of Chicago was formed and MacDowell served as its president. He was director of Armour & Company from 1920 to 1922 and vice president from 1923 to 1932. He was later director again. MacDowell retired from Armour Fertilizer on January 16, 1932. He was succeeded by John E. Sanford. He developed the manufacturing of blood albumen and used direct heat dryers and revolving drum mixers in the manufacturing of fertilizer.

MacDowell was a member of the committee on chemicals of the Council of National Defense. He served as director of the chemical division of the War Industries Board from 1917 to 1918. During the war, he helped develop the first commercially producing potash plant that used alunite as a raw ingredient. He also improved the chamber process of the manufacturing of sulfuric acid and the use of vanadium-alumina as a substitute for platinum in contact acid plants. He was an economic advisor for President Woodrow Wilson's Paris Peace Conference. During the peace talks, he lived with Alexander Legge in Paris and they worked closely together. He was Legge's alternate for the committee on Germany. In 1923, he was chairman of the trade and industry group of the U.S. delegation during the International Chamber of Commerce Meeting in Rome. In January 1929, he testified before the U.S. Senate interstate commerce committee in opposition to a bill to stabilize the bituminous coal industry. In early 1932, MacDowell retired from his position at Armour. In 1944, he was elected chairman of Florida's 5th district Republican campaign committee.

MacDowell was an honorary life member and served as president of the National Fertilizer Association from 1904 to 1906 and from 1920 to 1921. He was associated with the Florida Academy of Science and was a member of the Florida section of the American Chemical Society. He had inventions and patents in the chemical and fertilizer fields. He was director of the Garfield National Bank. He was president of the Western Society of Engineering in 1921 and had a membership in the American Institute of Mining & Metallurgical Engineering, the American Association for the Advancement of Science, the Chicago Historical Society, the International Chamber of Commerce and the Field Museum of Natural History. He was a fellow of the Royal Society of Great Britain. He was also director of the Orange County chapter of the American Red Cross, the Orange County Republican Club, Winter Park Chamber of Commerce, and the Thomas K. Baker Museum of Natural Sciences. He was a member of the board of directors of the Beal-Maltbie Shell Museum, Rollins College and the Winter Park University Club. From 1946 to his death, he was a member of the industrial division of the department of new industries of the Florida State Chamber of Commerce. He was chairman of the National Affairs Committee of the Winter Park Chamber of Commerce.

== Personal life ==
On October 25, 1892, MacDowell married Janet Borland, daughter of Matthew W. Borland, of Chicago. She died in 1929. In 1929, he lived at the Drake Hotel in Chicago. On October 27, 1934, he married Claire Leavitt. His hobby was golfing.

In 1941, he moved to Winter Park, Florida. He died on March 4, 1954, at a hospital in Orlando. He was buried in Palm Cemetery.

== Awards ==
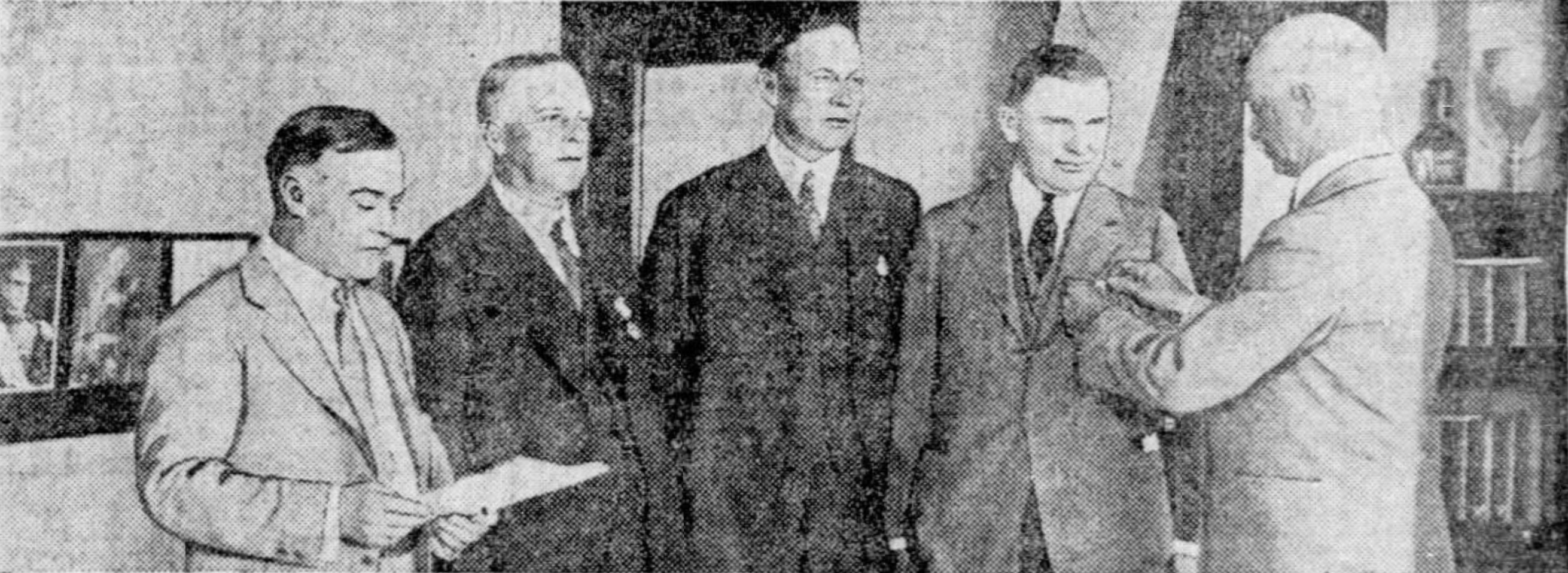
MacDowell (second from left) receiving Distinguished Service Medal in 1923

In 1923, MacDowell was awarded the Distinguished Service Medal for his work in World War I. He was given the Legion of Honour by France. He was awarded the Order of the Crown, commander class, by Belgium. He was awarded the Order of the Crown of Italy, knight class. In 1921, MacDowell received a Doctor of Science honorary degree from the University of Pittsburgh.

== Publications ==
- MacDowell, Charles H. "Reflections on Timely Topics". Better Crops: The Pocket Book of Agriculture (December 1924).
- MacDowell, Charles H. "Wide Importance of Plant-Food Minerals". The Canning Trade (September 1926).
- MacDowell, Charles H. "The Farm As An Important Chemical Consumer". Chemical Markets (June 1929).
