= Wellington, Ohio =

Village in Lorain County, Ohio, US

- Village
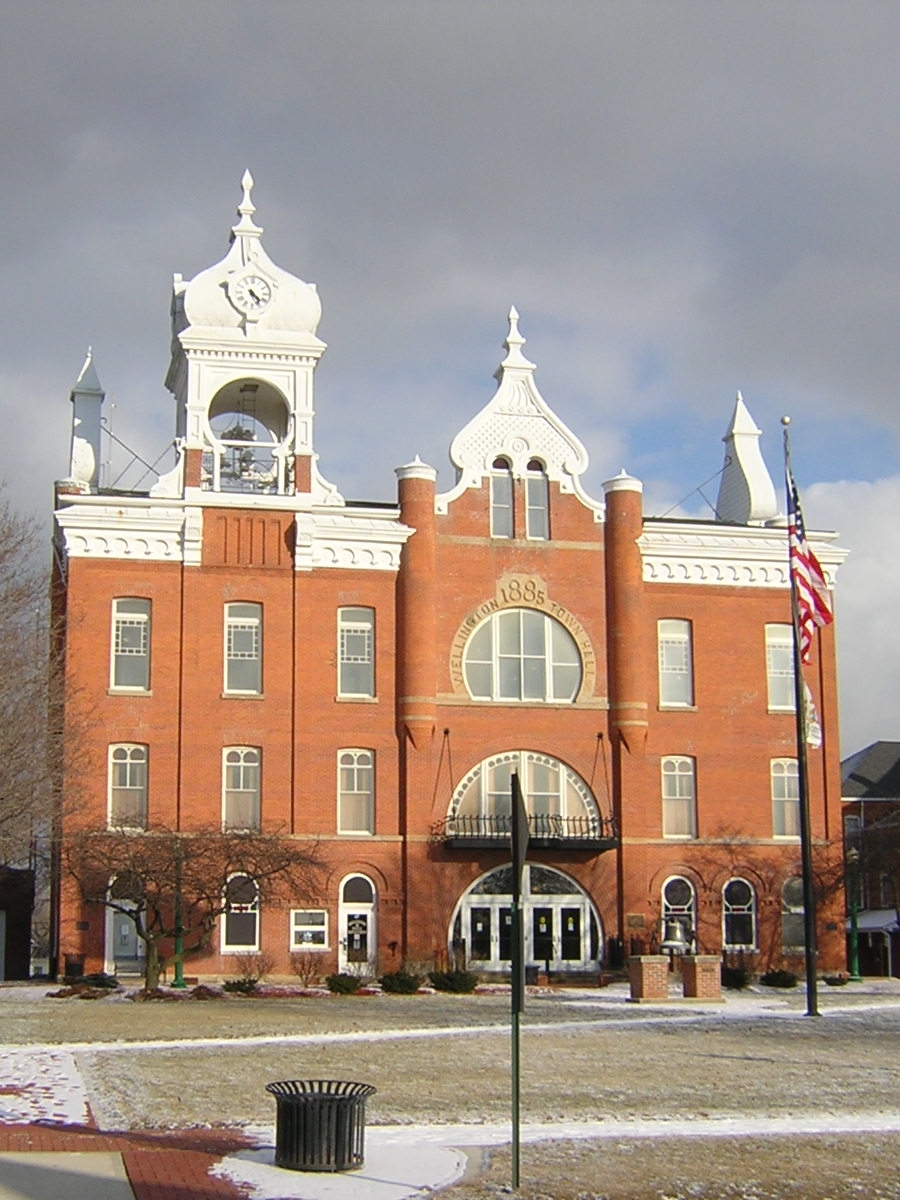
- Town hall of the Village of Wellington

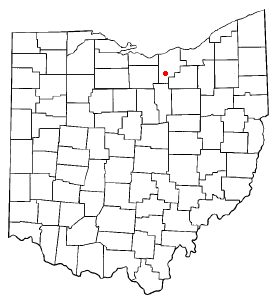
- Location in Ohio

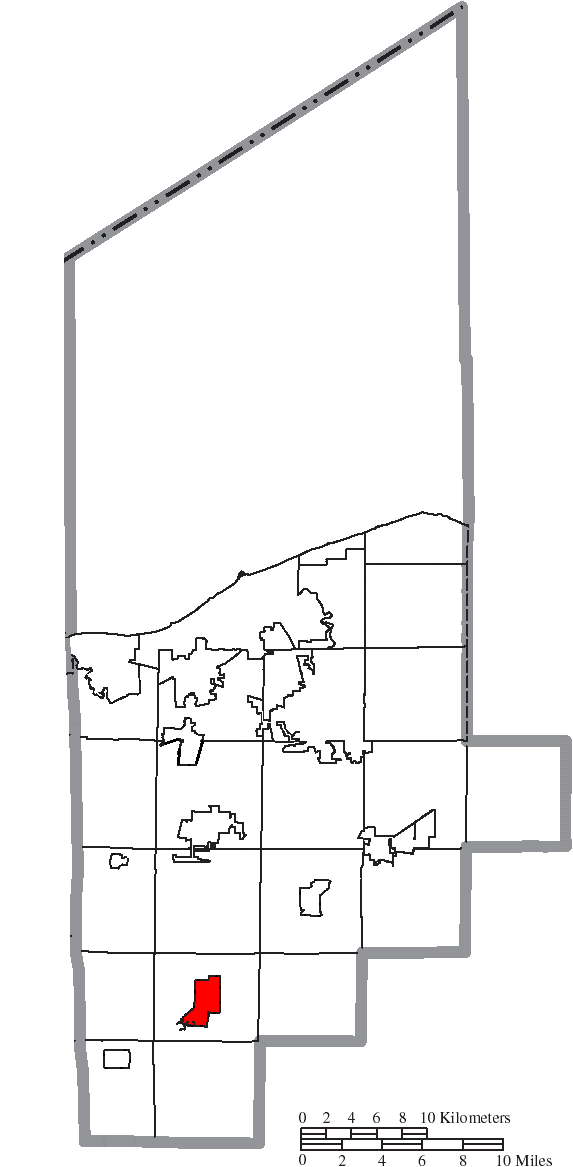
- Location of Wellington in Lorain County
- Coordinates: 41°09′10″N 82°14′12″W
- Country: United States
- State: Ohio
- County: Lorain
- Township: Wellington
- incorporated: 1855

Government
  - Type: Mayor-Administrator

Area
  - Total: 3.93 sq mi (10.19 km^{2})
  - Land: 3.64 sq mi (9.44 km^{2})
  - Water: 0.29 sq mi (0.75 km^{2}) 7.46%
- Elevation: 860 ft (260 m)

Population (2020)
  - Total: 4,799
  - Density: 1,316.9/sq mi (508.45/km^{2})
- Time zone: UTC-4 (EST)
  - Summer (DST): UTC-4 (EDT)
- Zip code: 44090
- Area code: 440
- FIPS code: 39-82642
- GNIS feature ID: 2400122
- Website: https://www.villageofwellington.com/

Wellington is a village in Lorain County, Ohio. The population was 4,799 at the time of the 2020 census.

== History ==
The rights to naming the village were given as a reward for how much road could be contracted to build. The original winner of the contest picked the name "Charlemont", to near universal disdain. The rights to name the town then went to William Welling, who chose the name "Wellington", either after himself or the Duke of Wellington. Wellington was incorporated as a village in 1855.

In 1858, the former American House Hotel (later torn down and replaced by Herrick Memorial Library) was the site of the Oberlin-Wellington Rescue. A group of men, both white and black and many from Oberlin, swarmed the hotel to rescue runaway slave John Price. He was being held by a US Marshal and his men, who intended to return him to his master in Kentucky.

The abolitionists transported Price out of town en route to the Underground Railroad and helped convey him to Canada. Thirty-seven men were indicted, but only two, Simeon M. Bushnell and Charles Henry Langston, were tried in federal court for interfering with the marshal in carrying out the Fugitive Slave Law. After Langston's eloquent speech about slavery and discrimination, the judge gave them light sentences. The events and trial received national attention, and kept the issue of slavery at the forefront of debate.

Archibald M. Willard, painter of the patriotic Spirit of '76 painting, lived in Wellington during the 19th century. He is buried in Greenwood Cemetery on the outskirts of the village. The Spirit of '76 Museum, also located in Wellington, is dedicated to Willard and the history of Wellington. The original drum and fife used as models in the painting are also on display.

On New Year's Day, 1951, two eleven-year-old boys, Gerald Kordelsky and William Flood, accidentally drowned in an abandoned well at Chismar Farm in Wellington.

In 2010, Wellington was named the "Best Old House Neighborhood" for the state of Ohio by This Old House Magazine in their annual feature article.

== Geography ==
Wellington is located at the intersection of State Routes 18 and 58.

According to the United States Census Bureau, the village has a total area of 3.89 square miles (10.08 km^{2}), of which 3.60 square miles (9.32 km^{2}) is land and 0.29 square miles (0.75 km^{2}) is water.

== Demographics ==
Historical population
| Census | Pop. | Note | %± |
|---|---|---|---|
| 1860 | 1,029 | | — |
| 1870 | 1,281 | | 24.5% |
| 1880 | 1,811 | | 41.4% |
| 1890 | 2,069 | | 14.2% |
| 1900 | 2,094 | | 1.2% |
| 1910 | 2,131 | | 1.8% |
| 1920 | 2,245 | | 5.3% |
| 1930 | 2,235 | | −0.4% |
| 1940 | 2,529 | | 13.2% |
| 1950 | 2,992 | | 18.3% |
| 1960 | 3,599 | | 20.3% |
| 1970 | 4,137 | | 14.9% |
| 1980 | 4,146 | | 0.2% |
| 1990 | 4,140 | | −0.1% |
| 2000 | 4,511 | | 9.0% |
| 2010 | 4,802 | | 6.5% |
| 2020 | 4,799 | | −0.1% |
U.S. Decennial Census

=== 2020 census ===
As of the 2020 census, Wellington had a population of 4,799. The median age was 43.4 years. 20.0% of residents were under the age of 18 and 21.0% of residents were 65 years of age or older. For every 100 females there were 94.1 males, and for every 100 females age 18 and over there were 91.5 males age 18 and over.

99.3% of residents lived in urban areas, while 0.7% lived in rural areas.

There were 2,053 households in Wellington, of which 26.5% had children under the age of 18 living in them. Of all households, 41.6% were married-couple households, 19.4% were households with a male householder and no spouse or partner present, and 29.2% were households with a female householder and no spouse or partner present. About 32.9% of all households were made up of individuals and 17.3% had someone living alone who was 65 years of age or older.

There were 2,159 housing units, of which 4.9% were vacant. The homeowner vacancy rate was 0.9% and the rental vacancy rate was 4.8%.

Racial composition as of the 2020 census
| Race | Number | Percent |
|---|---|---|
| White | 4,415 | 92.0% |
| Black or African American | 64 | 1.3% |
| American Indian and Alaska Native | 18 | 0.4% |
| Asian | 10 | 0.2% |
| Native Hawaiian and Other Pacific Islander | 0 | 0.0% |
| Some other race | 29 | 0.6% |
| Two or more races | 263 | 5.5% |
| Hispanic or Latino (of any race) | 147 | 3.1% |

=== 2010 census ===
As of the census of 2010, there were 4,802 people, 1,956 households, and 1,266 families living in the village. The population density was 1,333.9 inhabitants per square mile (515.0/km^{2}). There were 2,148 housing units at an average density of 596.7 per square mile (230.4/km^{2}). The racial makeup of the village was 95.8% White, 1.2% African American, 0.3% Native American, 0.4% Asian, 0.5% from other races, and 1.8% from two or more races. Hispanic or Latino people of any race were 2.0% of the population.

There were 1,956 households, of which 32.7% had children under the age of 18 living with them, 45.8% were married couples living together, 12.8% had a female householder with no husband present, 6.1% had a male householder with no wife present, and 35.3% were non-families. 30.7% of all households were made up of individuals, and 14.4% had someone living alone who was 65 years of age or older. The average household size was 2.39 and the average family size was 2.98.

The median age in the village was 39.5 years. 24.9% of residents were under the age of 18; 7.5% were between the ages of 18 and 24; 25.5% were from 25 to 44; 25.1% were from 45 to 64; and 17% were 65 years of age or older. The gender makeup of the village was 47.9% male and 52.1% female.

=== 2000 census ===
As of the census of 2000, there were 4,511 people, 1,723 households, and 1,173 families living in the village. The population density was 1,536.2 inhabitants per square mile (593.1/km^{2}). There were 1,850 housing units at an average density of 630.0 per square mile (243.2/km^{2}). The racial makeup of the village was 97.14% White, 1.33% African American, 0.27% Native American, 0.13% Asian, 0.02% Pacific Islander, 0.20% from other races, and 0.91% from two or more races. Hispanic or Latino people of any race were 1.04% of the population.

There were 1,723 households, out of which 34.4% had children under the age of 18 living with them, 51.9% were married couples living together, 11.4% had a female householder with no husband present, and 31.9% were non-families. 27.3% of all households were made up of individuals, and 13.7% had someone living alone who was 65 years of age or older. The average household size was 2.52 and the average family size was 3.07.

In the village, the population was spread out, with 27.2% under the age of 18, 8.4% from 18 to 24, 29.0% from 25 to 44, 19.3% from 45 to 64, and 16.1% who were 65 years of age or older. The median age was 35 years. For every 100 females there were 93.0 males. For every 100 females age 18 and over, there were 87.8 males.

The median income for a household in the village was $41,250, and the median income for a family was $45,460. Males had a median income of $35,385 versus $23,488 for females. The per capita income for the village was $17,566. About 3.3% of families and 8.1% of the population were below the poverty line, including 11.8% of those under age 18 and 9.3% of those age 65 or over.

== Government ==
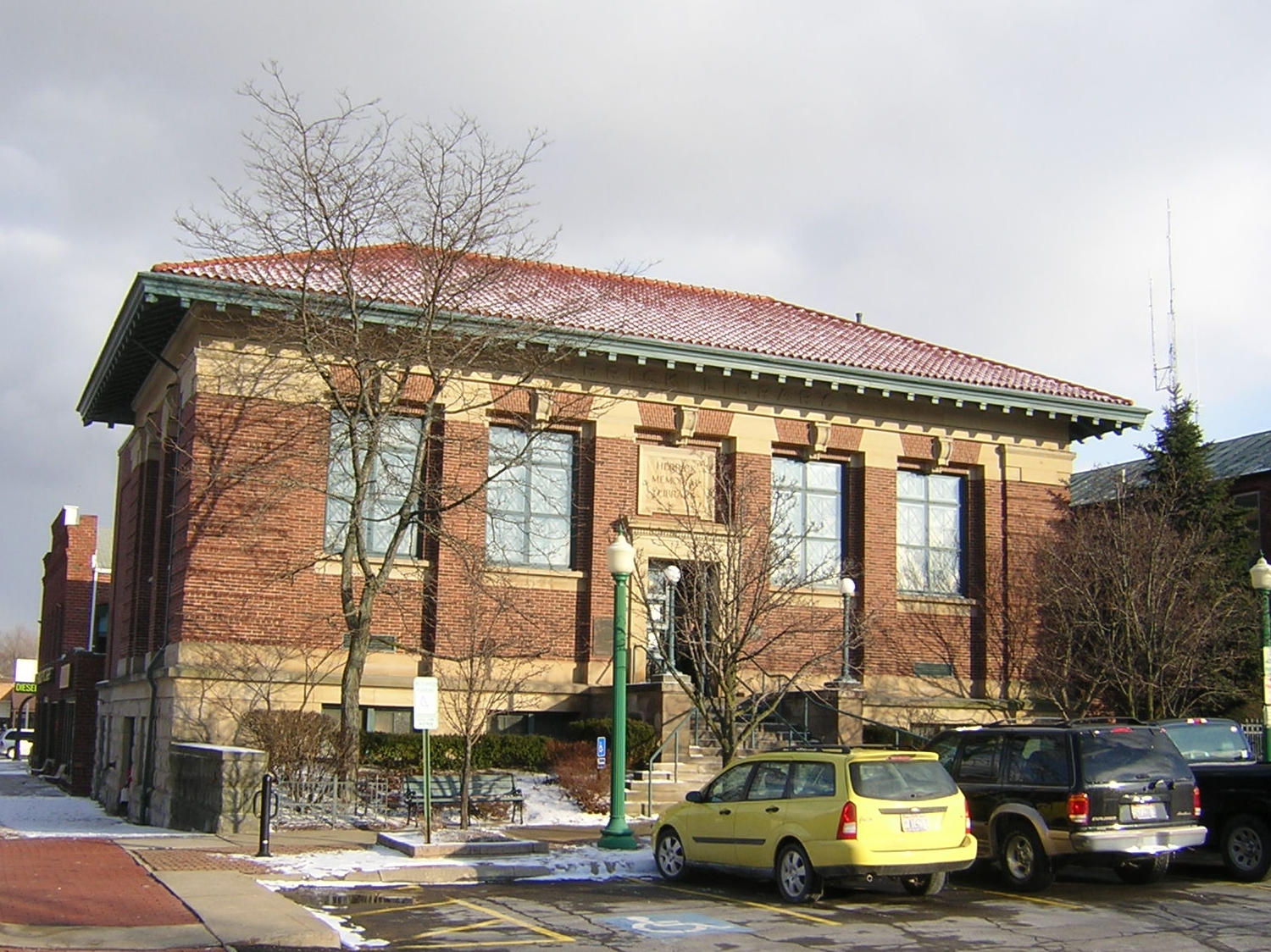
Herrick Memorial Library

As of 2024, Village Officials included: Village Manager Jonathan D. Greever, Finance Director Vanya Pfeiffer and Law Director Stephen Bond. Gene Hartman was Council President through December 31, 2024. Other members of the council were Guy Wells (through December 31, 2023), Helen Dronsfield (through December 31, 2023), Mark Bughman (through December 31, 2023), Keith Rowland (through December 31, 2024) and Gary Feron (through December 31, 2024).

Wellington's Herrick Memorial Library loaned more than 86,000 items to its 9,000 cardholders in 2005. Total holdings as of 2005 were over 57,000 volumes with over 165 periodical subscriptions.

Wellington lies within the 7th congressional district, represented by Max Miller.

== Education ==
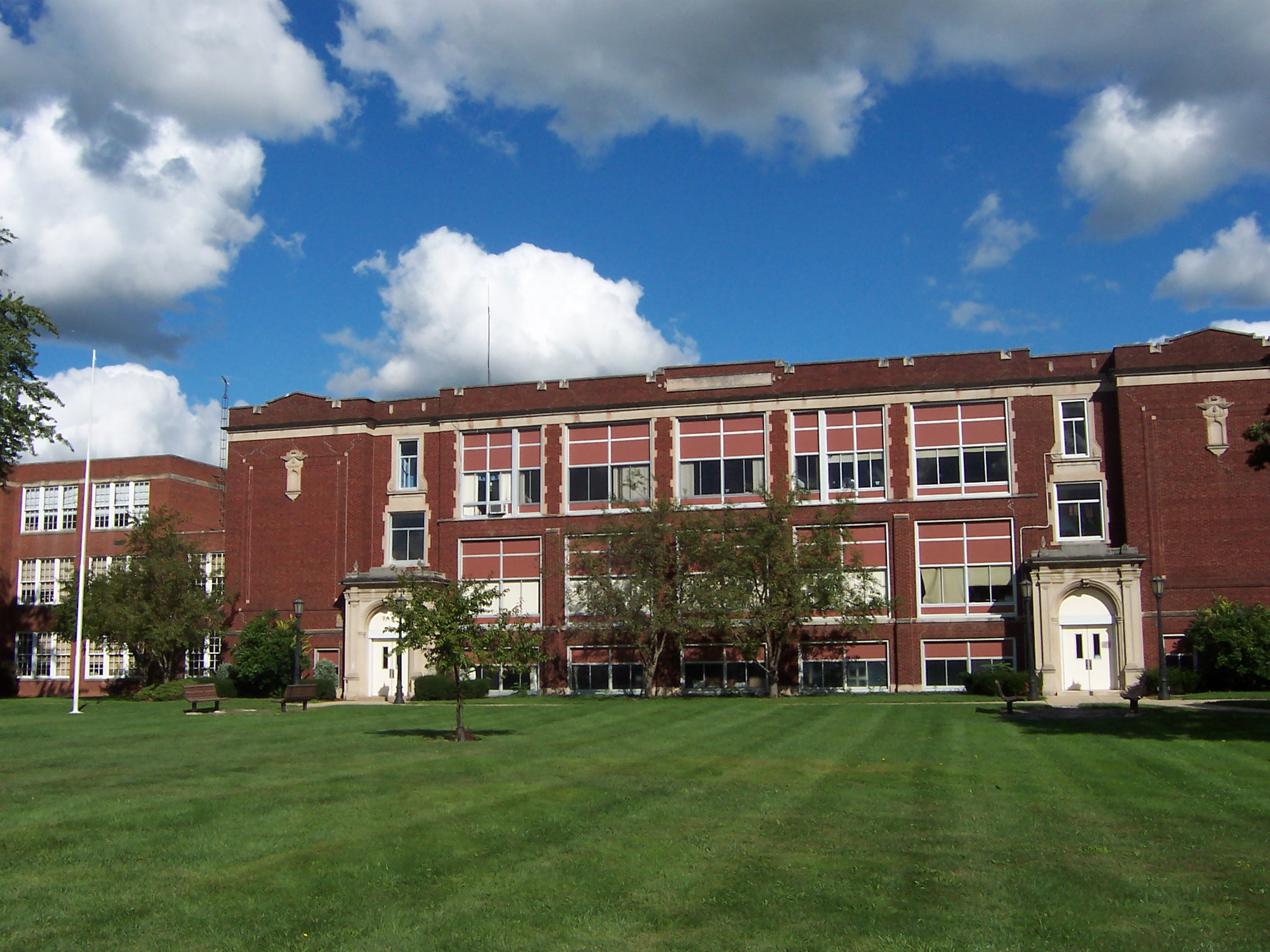
McCormick Middle School, 2008

Wellington is served by the Wellington Exempted Village School District (WEVSD), including the McCormick Middle School and Wellington High School.

== Festivals and events ==
In the late 19th century, Wellington was known as the "Cheese Capital of the World", and had a Heritage Cheese Festival in past years.

Two weeks before Labor Day, in late August, the Lorain County Fair, one of the biggest county fairs in the state of Ohio, takes place west of town on State Route 18 at the fairgrounds.

Each September since 1983, the Friends of the Herrick Memorial Library have sponsored the Harvest of the Arts, a large juried arts festival held on the town square. The event attracts more than 100 artisans and craftspeople and includes live musical performances, children's activities, and the raffle of a handmade quilt. All proceeds from the event support public programming at the library.

== In popular culture ==
- Some scenes in the 2022 film White Noise, based on the Don DeLillo novel, were filmed in Wellington.

== Sister city ==
Wellington has one sister city, as designated by the Sister Cities International:

- Crieff, Scotland, United Kingdom

== Notable people ==
- Edna Allyn, librarian
- Leonard Warden Bonney, aviator
- William Byron Colver, chairman of the Federal Trade Commission
- JT Daly, musician, producer, and songwriter
- Dana McKenzie, NFL official
- Ken Onion, knife-maker
- Daniel Petric, murderer
- Lois Sheffield, baseball player for the South Bend Blue Sox
- Jack Wadsworth, MLB pitcher
- S. S. Warner, former Ohio state treasurer
- Carl S. Williams, former NFL player and ophthalmologist
