= March F. Chase =

American chemical engineer (1876–1935)

- Born: March Frederick Chase; December 12, 1876; Alton, Illinois, U.S.
- Died: April 30, 1935 (aged 58); New York City, U.S.
- Resting place: Mineral Point, Wisconsin, U.S.
- Education: Trinity College (BS); University of Wisconsin Law School
- Spouse: Margery Elizabeth Lambertson (m. 1907)
- Children: 2

March Frederick Chase (December 12, 1876 – April 30, 1935) was an American chemical engineer. He was a specialist in the production of sulfuric acid and was head of the explosives division of the War Industries Board during World War I.

== Early life ==
March Frederick Chase was born on December 12, 1876, in Alton, Illinois, to Annie Wycherley (née Mathews) and Reverend March Chase. He graduated from Mineral Point High School in Mineral Point, Wisconsin. He graduated from Trinity College with a Bachelor of Science in 1897. He was a member of Phi Beta Kappa. He later graduated from the University of Wisconsin Law School in 1900. He was a member of Sigma Chi.

== Career ==
In 1907, Chase worked as superintendent of Mineral Point Zinc Company in Depue, Illinois. He worked for the New Jersey Zinc Company. He became known as a specialist in the production of sulfuric acid. He was vice president of the Commercial Acid Company of St. Louis, Missouri.

Following a shortage in sulfuric acid in the fall of 1917, Chase was drafted by Leland L. Summers to serve on the War Industries Board. His expertise in sulfuric acid was deemed essential to help the government increase sulfuric acid production to 1,500,000 tons in 1918. Chase worked with Mr. Jackling in erecting a powder plant in Nitro, West Virginia. He became the head of the explosives division of the board in July 1918. He was a member of the committee that advised President Woodrow Wilson on economic questions during the Paris Peace Conference.

Chase was a partner of the engineering consulting firm L. L. Somers & Co. It was later renamed Chase & Waring Company. He was elected vice president of Commercial Solvents in May 1933.

== Personal life ==
Chase married Margery Elizabeth Lambertson, granddaughter of Joseph Gundry, of Mineral Point on June 19, 1907. They had a son and daughter, William Gundry and Sarah. His wife died in 1926.

Chase died on April 30, 1935, in New York City. He was buried in Mineral Point.

== Works ==
=== Patents ===
- Chase, March F.; Pierce, Frederic E.; Skogmark, John (1923) "Manufacture of Sulphuric Anhydride", U.S. Patent Number 1,472,790.
- Skogmark, John; Chase, March F. (1927) "Process and Apparatus for Extracting Zinc". U.S. Patent Number 1,652,184.
- Chase, March F.; Pierce, Frederic E.; Skogmark, John (1930) "Making Producer Gas", U.S. Patent Number 1,761,384.

=== Publications ===
- Chase, March F. (1917) "Choice of A Blend-Roasting Furnace". Engineering and Mining Journal.
- Chase, March F. (1919) "Zinc Industry in Belgium". Chemical and Metallurgical Engineering.
- Chase, March F. (1922) "The U.S. Government Explosives Plant, Nitro, West Virginia", The Journal of Industrial and Engineering Chemistry.
