= Women's City Club of Washington, D.C. =

Women's organization

The Women's City Club of Washington, D.C. was established in 1919. The founding president was Judge Mary O'Toole of the Municipal Court of Washington, D.C., who was the first woman municipal judge in the United States. The club became a member of the Federation of Women's Clubs in 1920, and was the first local women's club with its own meeting house, based at 736 Jackson Place.

== Ethos ==
Other area women's clubs prior to 1919 had strict qualifications for membership, but the Women's City Club of Washington, D.C. stated that it strove to be more inclusive. O'Toole, the founding president, said that the group hoped to attract not only women in the academic and professional sphere, but housewives as well. The Club's charter called for a "better understanding among women, and a place for women to meet and socialise". Along the Club’s other objectives were cultural and civic advancement in the District, and general welfare for its citizens. The Club took positions on issues such as women's suffrage, home rule, and abolition of capital punishment.

== Activities ==
Club activities ranged from Spanish and French language classes, to lecture series concerning the arts and sciences. The Club also participated in the Annual Red Cross campaign and organised a food and clothing drive for war torn countries in Europe following the Second World War. The Music Unit of the National League of American Pen Women hosted the American Women Composers First Festival of Music at the Club's meeting house.

== Notable club members ==
The honorary first member, and first chairwoman of the Club, was Dr Ellen Spencer Mussey, co-founder of the Washington College of Law and the National Association of Women Lawyers.

Ollie Josephine Prescott Baird Bennett was a charter member.

Several first ladies became honorary members of the organisation, including Lou Henry Hoover, Eleanor Roosevelt, and Bess Truman. Helen Keller, Marie Curie, and Charles Lindbergh were given special awards by the Club for their pursuit of knowledge, dedication to country and humanitarian endeavours.

== See also ==
- Woman's club movement
- List of women's club buildings
