= Lois Sheffield =

American baseball player

Lois Marie Sheffield played briefly for the South Bend Blue Sox of the All-American Girls Professional Baseball League (AAGPBL) in 1952. She was born June 15, 1933, in Wellington, Ohio, and died in Wellington on November 17, 2014.
