= Lewis R. Atwood =

American businessman (1860–1926)

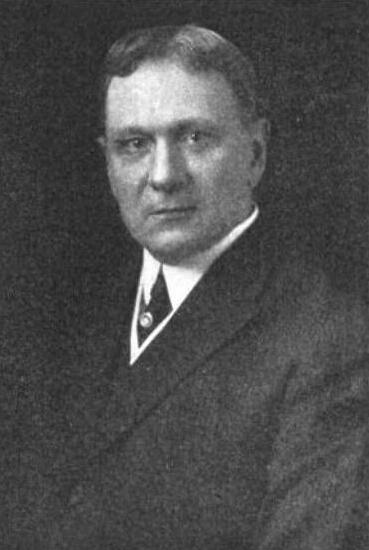
- Portrait of Atwood in a 1923 publication
- Born: Lewis Rogers Atwood; September 6, 1860; Louisville, Kentucky, U.S.
- Died: January 8, 1926 (aged 65); Louisville, Kentucky, U.S.
- Resting place: Cave Hill Cemetery
- Occupation: Businessman
- Spouse(s): Caroline Butler (m. 1888; died 1919) Marry Stella Barry (m. 1921)
- Children: 4

Lewis Rogers Atwood (September 6, 1860 – January 8, 1926) was an American businessman from Louisville, Kentucky. He was president of Peaslee-Gaulbert Company and served as chief of the paint and pigment section of the War Industries Board.

== Early life ==
Lewis Rogers Atwood was born on September 6, 1860, in Louisville, Kentucky, to Jean Farrar (née Rogers) and Robert Atwood. He was educated in public schools.

== Career ==
In 1878, Atwood joined the Peaslee-Gaulbert Company as an office boy. From 1879 to 1887, he worked as a salesman and traveled throughout the South. In 1889, he was promoted to president's assistant by President Gaulbert. He was elected as secretary in 1894. In 1908, following the death of Gaulbert, he was elected as president. He remained president until his death. Under his leadership, the company expanded its sales throughout the south, southeast and southwest, including establishing branches in Atlanta, Georgia, and Dallas, Texas. He also served as president of the subsidiaries of the company, Louisville Lead & Color Company, General Varnish Company and Crystal Mirror Works. In 1914, he was elected president of the National Paint, Oil and Varnish Association. He was elected again and served from 1922 to 1923.

In 1918, during World War I, Atwood succeeded Russell S. Hubbard as chief of the paint and pigment section of the War Industries Board. He was a member of the Save the Surface Advisory Committee and the Educational Bureau.

In 1899, he was elected as a member of the board of directors of the Kentucky Theological Seminary. He was president of the Louisville Young Mens Christian Association (YMCA) for five years. He was director of the First National Bank of Louisville, the Kentucky Title Savings Bank and Trust Company of Louisville, the Kentucky Title Company, the Home Finance Company, the Southern Oil Company, and the Turner-Day-Woolworth Handle Company. He was trustee of the American Printing House for the Blind. He was one of the founders of the Louisville Industrial Foundation and served as its president twice.

== Personal life ==
Atwood married Caroline Butler on October 4, 1888. She was the daughter of John Russell Butler of the Confederate Army, great niece of General William O. Butler, granddaughter of Charles Wilkins Short, and great-granddaughter of Peyton Short. They had four children, Percival "Pierce" Butler, Lewis Roger Jr., Jane Short and Barbara Thruston. His wife died in 1919. He married Mary Stella Barry, sister of newspaperman Robert Barry, on October 17, 1921. His son Pierce died in World War I. He was a member of the Presbyterian Church. His hobbies included playing golf. He lived on South Third Street in Louisville.

In June 1925, Atwood had an operation in Philadelphia. He suffered a setback and was hospitalized at the Louisville Infirmary in December 1925. He remained in the hospital and died of pneumonia three weeks later on January 8, 1926. He was buried in Cave Hill Cemetery. His estate was estimated at US$600,000 (equivalent to $10,656,767 in 2024) at the time of his death.
