= Thomas C. Powell =

American railroad executive (1865–1945)

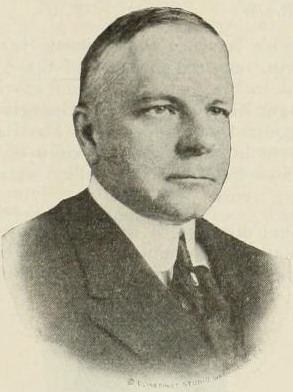
- Sketch of Powell in 1920
- Born: Thomas Carr Powell; September 5, 1865; Cincinnati, Ohio, U.S.
- Died: February 9, 1945 (aged 79); New Orleans, Louisiana, U.S.
- Resting place: Spring Grove Cemetery
- Occupation: Railroad executive
- Spouse: Leigh Whittemore (m. 1910; died 1930)
- Children: 1

Thomas Carr Powell (September 5, 1865 – February 9, 1945) was an American railroad executive from Cincinnati, Ohio. During World War I, he served as manager of inland traffic and was a member of the priorities committee in the War Industries Board. He also served as director of the Division of Capital Expenditures for the United States Railroad Administration. Powell was president of both the Chicago and Eastern Illinois Railroad and the Chicago and Western Indiana Railroad.

== Early life ==
Thomas Carr Powell was born on September 5, 1865, in Cincinnati, Ohio, to Mary (née Berrall) and Thomas Powell. His father was a commission broker and his grandfather owned a lace factory in Nottingham, England. He attended Woodward High School in Brooklyn and public schools in Cincinnati and Dunellen, New Jersey. At a young age, he worked on the Cincinnati docks along the Ohio River with his father.

== Career ==
Powell was shipping clerk for the Monarch Oil Company. In 1884, Powell worked as a traffic mail clerk for Cincinnati, New Orleans and Texas Pacific Railway. He later became rate clerk for the Queen and Crescent Route, chief rate clerk, and then chief rate clerk to the traffic manager. On June 1, 1893, he was appointed assistant and general freight agent. On November 1, 1895, he joined Southern Railway as chief clerk to the general freight agent in Washington, D.C.. On August 4, 1898, his role was expanded to the Northern Alabama Railway. He was promoted to assistant freight traffic manager on July 1, 1899. On March 15, 1902, he was promoted to freight traffic manager. On April 1, 1905, he was elected vice president in charge of traffic in the west and took over the operating department in St. Louis, Missouri, for the St. Louis and Louisville lines. On August 1, 1907, he was elected vice president of all departments of Cincinnati, New Orleans, and Texas Pacific Railway and the Alabama Great Southern Railroad. His office was in the Ingalls Building in Cincinnati. He later became vice president in charge of traffic of the Southern Railway in Cincinnati.

In 1915, Powell became president of the Cincinnati Chamber of Commerce. In 1917, Powell joined the War Industries Board as manager of inland traffic and as a member of the priorities committee. On January 10, 1919, he was appointed by President Woodrow Wilson to replace Robert S. Lovett as director of the Division of Capital Expenditures of the United States Railroad Administration. He was also chairman of the Claims Committee.

On February 15, 1920, he was elected vice president in charge of traffic for Erie Railroad. He served in that role until 1925. He was elected as president of Chicago and Eastern Illinois Railroad on August 1, 1925. On January 1, 1931, he was named chairman of the board and retired later that year on August 1, 1931. He also served as president of Chicago and Western Indiana Railroad, Belt Railway of Chicago, Terminal Railway Association of St. Louis and the Railway Express Agency.

== Personal life ==
Powell married Leigh Whittemore, daughter of Robert B. Whittemore, of St. Louis on June 16, 1910. They had one daughter, Mary Leigh. His wife died in 1930. While in St. Louis, Powell lived at 3737 Washington Boulevard. He had a summer home on Harbor Road in Gloucester, Massachusetts. He had a home at 1721 State Street in New Orleans.

Powell died on February 9, 1945, in New Orleans. He was buried at Spring Grove Cemetery.
