= Frank A. Scott =

American businessman and government official (1873–1949)

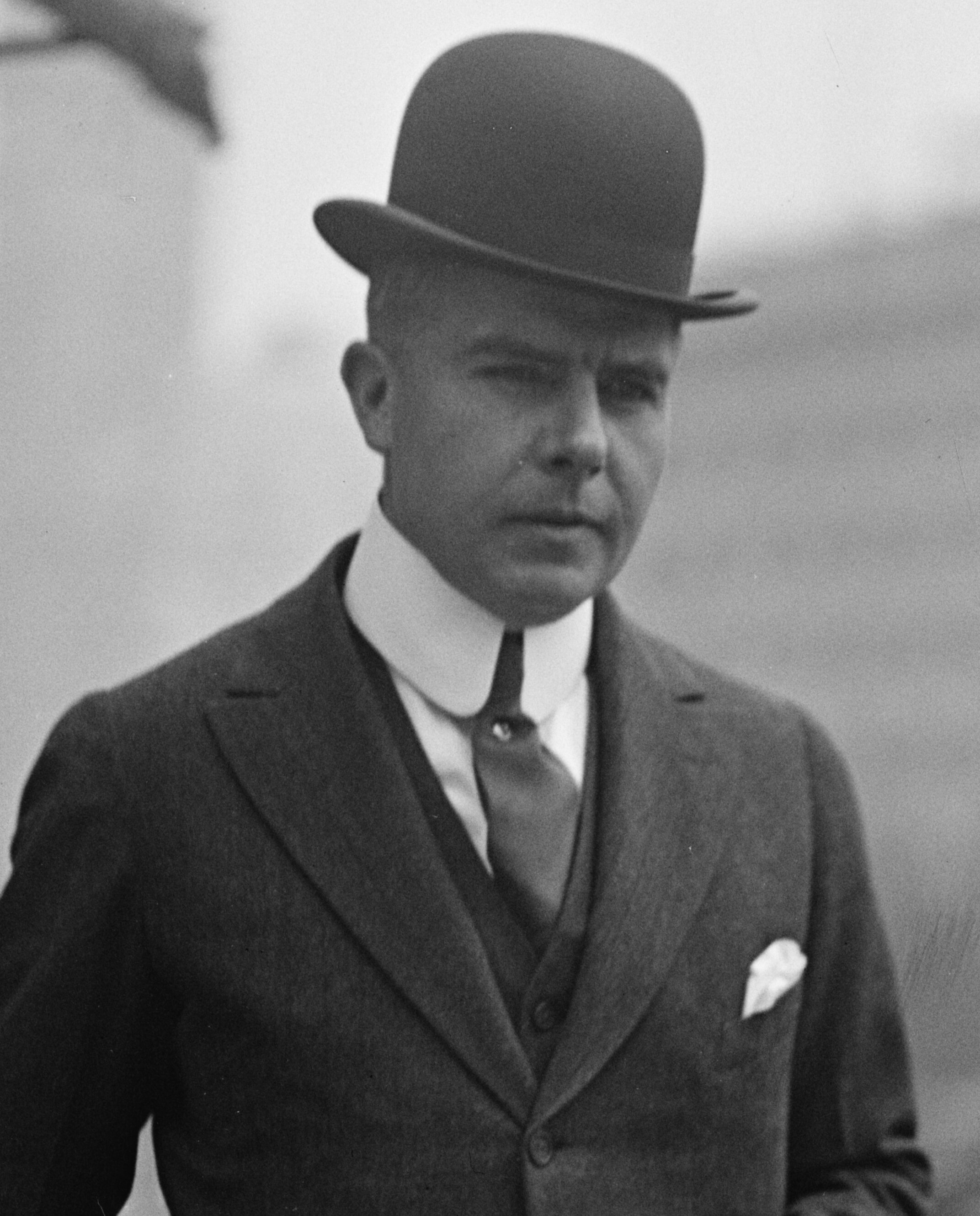
- Scott in 1917
- Born: Frank Augustus Scott; March 22, 1873; Cleveland, Ohio, U.S.
- Died: April 15, 1949 (aged 76); Mentor, Ohio, U.S.
- Resting place: Lake View Cemetery
- Occupations: Politician; government official
- Spouse(s): Bertha Dynes (m. 1896; died 1909) Faith Alice Fraser (m. 1911; died 1936) Dulcie Shifflett Scott
- Children: 5

Signature
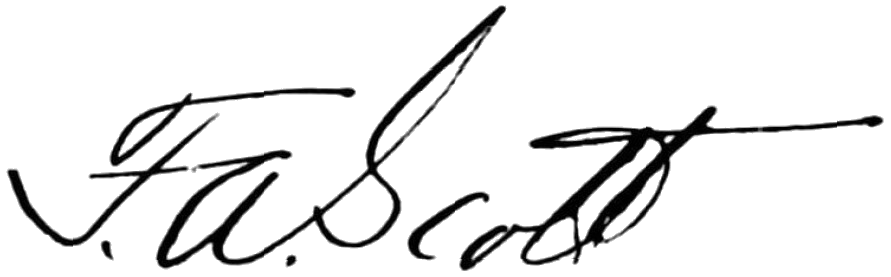

Frank Augustus Scott (March 22, 1873 – April 15, 1949) was an American businessman and government official from Cleveland, Ohio. He served as the first chairman of the War Industries Board and was president and chairman of the board of Warner & Swasey.

== Early life ==
Frank Augustus Scott was born on March 22, 1873, in Cleveland, Ohio, to Sarah Ann (née Warr) and Robert Crozier Scott. His father encouraged Scott to take up the study of the Civil War as a hobby. His father died when Scott was the age of 10. He worked as a newsboy from the age of 10 to 12. He then became a messenger boy for the Western Union Telegraph Company and later delivered dispatches from the Associated Press. He became an office boy for the local freight agent and then served as clerk in the freight office. He attended schools in Cleveland and received a high school level education in Latin, English and history under the tutelage of John H. Dynes, a professor of Western Reserve University.

== Career ==
About the age of 18, Scott was employed by the standing committee on transportation of the Cleveland Chamber of Commerce as an expert on freight rates. In 1895, he became assistant secretary of the chamber of commerce and in 1899, he was elected secretary and remained in that role until 1905. In 1905, he became secretary and treasurer of the Superior Savings and Trust Company, led by Jeremiah J. Sullivan. He remained in that role for three years and from 1908 to 1909, he was a receiver for the Municipal Traction Company.

In 1909, Scott became secretary, treasurer and director of Warner & Swasey Company, a manufacturer of precision optical instruments. The company was led by W. R. Warner and Ambrose Swasey. Following a trip to Europe prior to 1914, he saw the potential of a future German conflict and expanded production of munitions. In 1916, he became vice president. He later served as president and chairman of the board.

Prior to World War I, Scott was a member of the naval consulting board. Following the direction of fellow Cleveland native Newton D. Baker, Scott was elected as chairman of the Munitions Standard Board on March 21, 1917. It became the General Munitions Board and Scott served as its chairman in April 1917. He became chairman of the War Industries Board in July 1917. Citing the recurrence of an illness he had in 1912, Scott resigned as chairman of the board on October 26, 1917. He was succeeded by Daniel Willard for a few months before Bernard Baruch took over as chairman. Following his resignation, he lived in California until March 1918. In 1924, Scott was made chief of the Cleveland Ordnance Division. He was given a colonel's commission in the U.S. Army. He resigned from the Army in November 1928. In 1925, he became an advisor of the Army Industrial College and served as a faculty member.

During the Great Depression, Scott managed the finances and investments of the estate of Samuel Livingston Mather II and Western Reserve University. His success with the finances of Mather are credited with helping Western Reserve continue operations during the depression. He was also a trustee of Western Reserve University. In 1932, he became head of the India Tire & Rubber Company of Mogadore, Ohio. In 1940, he shared his opposition to drafting industrial concerns to support the war effort and support for a strategy of cooperation between industry and government.

Scott was director of the Ohio Bell Telephone Company, the Youngstown Sheet & Tube Company, Cleveland Trust Company and treasurer of Lakeside Hospital. He was president of Liquidating Shares Inc. He was a member of the Rowfant and Union Clubs of Cleveland and the Army and Navy Club and Chevy Chase Club in Washington, D.C.

== Personal life ==
Scott married Bertha Dynes of Cleveland in 1896. They had a son and two daughters, Chester B., Katharine B. and Eleanor L. His wife died in 1909. He married Faith Alice Fraser, daughter of John G. Fraser, of Cleveland on September 27, 1911. She died in 1936. He married Dulcie (née Shifflett) Scott, widow of his son Chester. He also had a son and daughter, Malcolm F. and Elizabeth. His family owned a 500 acres (200 ha) estate at Bread Loaf in Ripton, Vermont. He lived there in the summers for more than 40 years. He lived on Monmouth and Guilford roads in Cleveland.

Scott died on April 15, 1949, aged 76, at his home in Mentor. He was buried in Lake View Cemetery.

== Awards ==
In 1919, Scott was awarded the Distinguished Service Medal. In 1926, he received a Doctor of Laws from Western Reserve University. In 1932, he received the Ordnance Medal of Merit from the Army Ordnance Association "for leadership and administrative ability in the progress of American munitions preparedness".
