= William Byron Colver =

American journalist and public official (1870–1926)

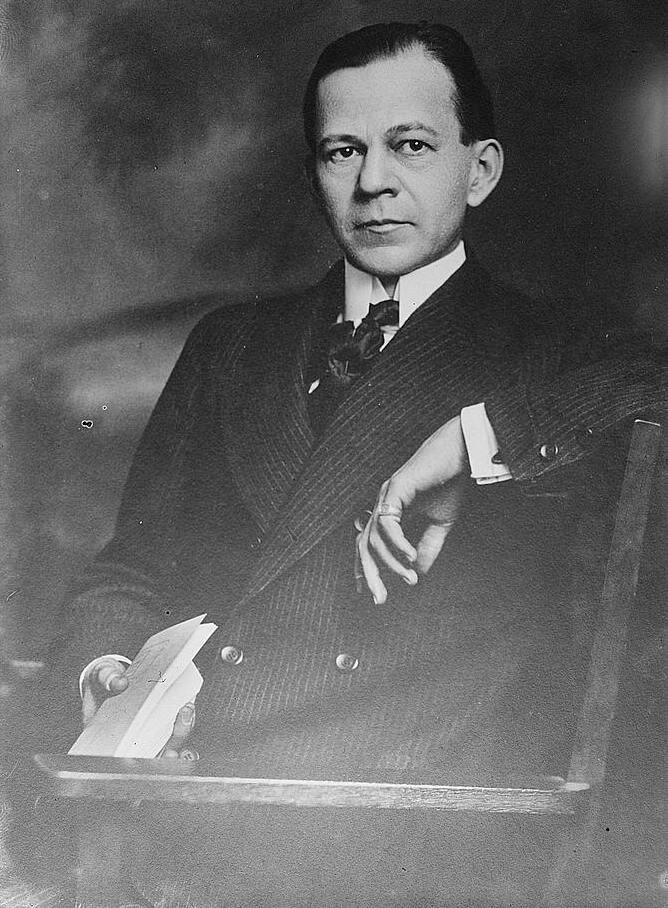
- Colver in 1917

Chair of the Federal Trade Commission
- In office May 7, 1918 – June 30, 1919
- President: Woodrow Wilson
- Preceded by: William J. Harris
- Succeeded by: John Franklin Fort

Personal details
- Born: September 26, 1870 Wellington, Ohio, U.S.
- Died: May 28, 1926 (aged 55) Washington, D.C., U.S.
- Party: Democratic
- Spouse: Pauline Simmons (m. 1897)
- Education: Ohio State University
- Occupation: Journalist; lawyer

William Byron Colver (September 26, 1870 – May 28, 1926) was an American journalist and lawyer who served as chairman of the Federal Trade Commission and general editorial director of the Scripps‐Howard newspapers. He was a member of the price-fixing committee of the War Industries Board during World War I.

== Early life ==
William Byron Colver was born on September 26, 1870, in Wellington, Ohio, to Josephine L. (née Noble) and Byron H. Colver. He attended common schools and graduated from Ohio State University in law in 1891. He was admitted to the bar in 1892.

== Career ==
After graduating, Colver practiced law in Cleveland and Sandusky for two years.

He was a journalist for The Cleveland Leader (then the Plain Dealer) and later the Cleveland Press. During the Russo-Japanese War, he traveled to Japan and China, and he served as a war correspondent in Manchuria. He served as New York and Washington correspondent for the Scripps‐Howard newspapers (then Scripps-McRae) from 1898 to 1900. He helped organize the Newspaper Editorial Alliance and served as its general manager from 1907 to 1912 and also served as editor. In his obituary, it was noted his editorials were influential in highlighting the forest exploitation in the Pinchot–Ballinger controversy and led to the resignation of Secretary of the Interior Richard A. Ballinger. He was appointed as secretary of the Cleveland Municipal Street Railway Company and served for one year. He fought for public control of the streetcar lines during Mayor Tom L. Johnson's tenure. In December 1904, he was appointed as Cuyahoga County tax inquisitor. He served as editor-in-chief of the Clover Leaf newspapers in Minnesota and Nebraska until 1917. He was also publisher of the Daily News.

On March 21, 1917, President Woodrow Wilson appointed Colver to the Federal Trade Commission. He served as chairman of the commission from 1918 to 1919. He left the commission in 1920. During his tenure, he led a number of fights including the "stolen files" case against Chicago meatpackers. During World War I, he served as a member of the price fixing committee of the War Industries Board.

In 1919, he formed the Scripps-Howard Newspaper Alliance (then Scripps-McRae Press Association). He later served as general editorial director for Scripps-Howard. He retired in 1924. An editorialist, he believed tabloid journalism would become competitive with standard newspapers. In a letter in April 1911, he wrote the editorial column was the "personality of the paper, its incarnation into human being".

== Personal life ==
In 1897, Colver married Pauline Simmons of Cleveland. He had one daughter, Pollyanne. He was friends with Cleveland mayor Tom L. Johnson.

He died on May 28, 1926, at his home at 3303 18th Street N.W. in Washington, D.C. He was buried at Fort Lincoln Cemetery. His widow died in 1964.
