= John M. Curran =

American politician and lawyer (1868–1935)

- Curran in a 1923 publication

Member of the Illinois House of Representatives
- In office 1912–1914

Personal details
- Born: John McCollum Curran; July 28, 1868; Brooklyn, New York, U.S.
- Died: July 27, 1935 (aged 66); Montecito, California, U.S.
- Resting place: Santa Barbara Cemetery
- Political party: Progressive Party
- Spouse: Mae Rawson Fuller (m. 1901)
- Children: 8
- Education: Hamilton College (AB, AM); Kent College of Law; Lake Forest College (LLB)
- Occupation: Politician; lawyer

John McCollum Curran (July 28, 1868 – July 27, 1935) was an American politician and lawyer from Illinois. He served as a lieutenant in the Spanish–American War. He was a member of the Progressive Party and served as a member of the Illinois House of Representatives from 1912 to 1914. Later in life, he practiced law in Santa Barbara, California.

== Early life ==
John McCollum Curran was born on July 28, 1868, in Brooklyn, New York, to Isabella (née Davidson) and Hugh McCollum Curran. His grandfather emigrated from Belfast, Ireland. Curran graduated from Potsdam Normal School. He graduated from Hamilton College with a Bachelor of Arts in 1892. He attended Kent College of Law in Chicago in 1893 and later graduated with a Bachelor of Laws from Lake Forest College in 1894. He was admitted to the bar in 1893. He returned to Hamilton College and graduated with a Master of Arts in 1895.

== Career ==
Following his graduation from law school, Curran practiced law with Charles G. Neely in Chicago for two years. From 1895 to 1898, he was a member of the Chicago law firm Harbert, Curran & Harbert. Following the outbreak of the Spanish–American War, he joined as a second lieutenant with the 5th Regiment, Illinois Volunteers. He participated in the Cuban campaign and was transferred to the provisional battalion of engineers under Lieutenant Colonel William Black. He commanded the first party that landed in Puerto Rico.

Curran returned to Chicago to practice law.He had a general practice that focused on probate and insurance law. From 1904 to 1912, he was a lawyer with the National Life Insurance Company of Illinois. In 1900, he was a member of the city council of Evanston. In 1905, he was a trustee of Winnetka. Curran was a member of the Progressive Party. He served as a member of the Illinois House of Representatives from 1912 to 1914. He was a member of the municipal corporations, temperance, military affairs, statutory revision, and public utilities committees. In 1913, he led the creation and passing of the first public utility bill in Illinois. During World War I, he was a member of the War Industries Board. He was first in charge of textile research, but was later in charge of foreign research on civilian conservation. He published a monograph on the U.S. button industry.

Curran moved to Santa Barbara, California, in 1919 and practiced law with another Illinois lawyer John Jameson. He handled the legal work for the Santa Barbara Community Chest, the Lobero Theatre, and the Community Arts Association. From 1922 to 1926, he was director of the Central Bank of Santa Barbara. He became director in 1930 and served as chairman of the board of the Santa Barbara Mutual Building and Loan Company from 1933 to his death. He founded the Santa Barbara University Club. In 1930, he was president of the Santa Barbara YMCA board. From 1924 to 1934, he was trustee of Pomona College. He was director of the Santa Barbara Chamber of Commerce. He was a member of Phi Beta Kappa and served as its president in 1926.

== Personal life ==
Curran married Mae Rawson Fuller, daughter of lumber merchant Samuel Rawson Fuller, on September 11, 1901, in Glasgow, Scotland. They had eight children, Frances, Katherine, Rita, John Davidson, Barbara Anne, Rawson Fuller, Carlene Deborah and Hugh McCollum. He was a Presbyterian.

Curran had a stroke on July 27, 1935. He died months later on September 17, 1935, at his home in Montecito. He was buried in Santa Barbara Cemetery.
