= McCormick Middle School =

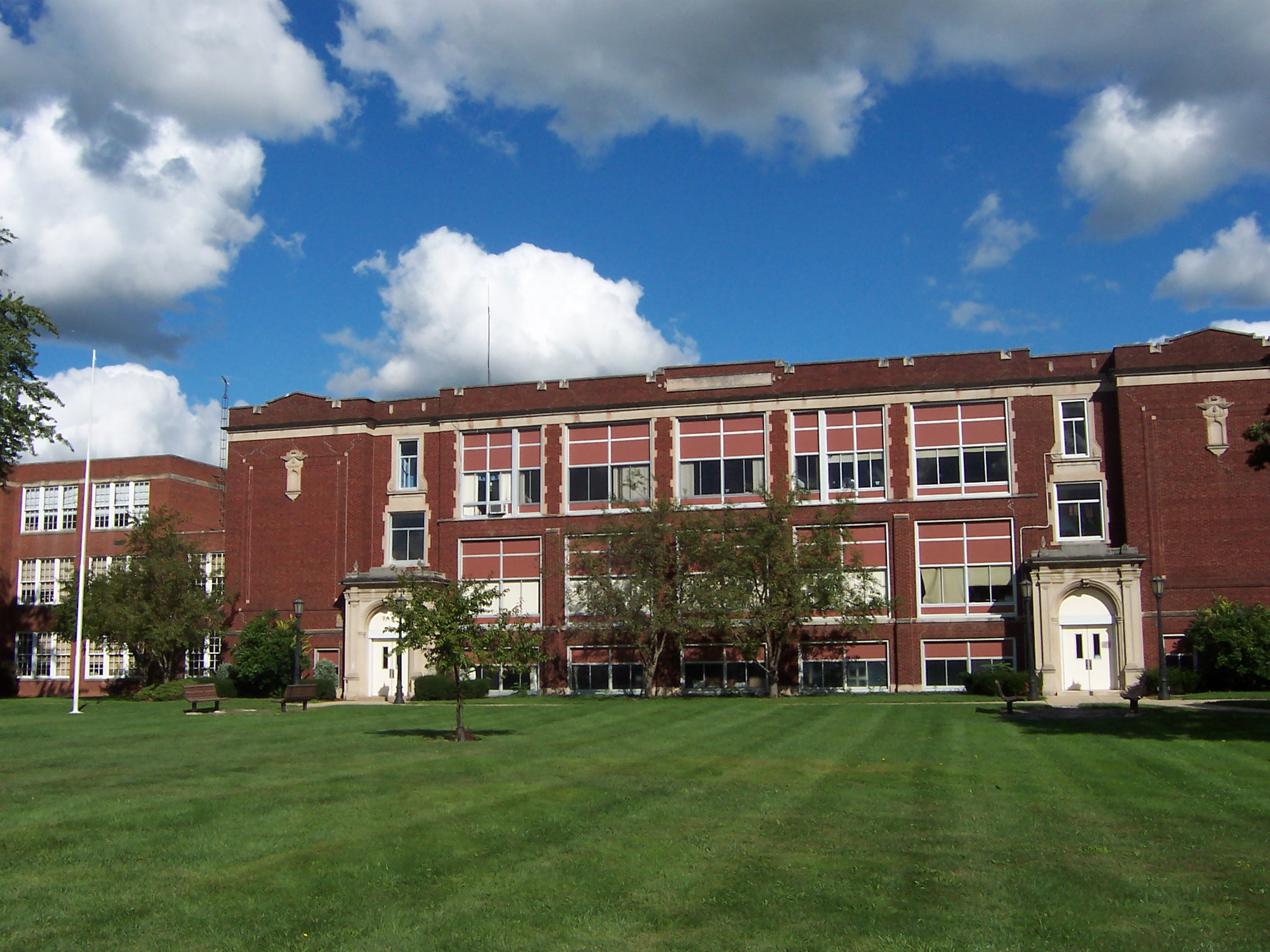
- Old McCormick Middle School - Wellington, Ohio

Location
- Wellington, Lorain County, Ohio
- Coordinates: 41°9′55″N 82°13′3″W

Information
- Established: 1867 (1916, 1938, 1953)
- Website: https://mms.wellingtonvillageschools.org/

McCormick Middle School is part of the Wellington Exempted Village School District (WEVSD), located in Wellington in Lorain County, Ohio.

== History ==
The original 13,114 ft^{2} (1,218.3 m^{2}) school was built in 1867 and was primarily used for educational and cafeteria space. It was hidden from view by the 20,010 ft^{2} (1,859 m^{2}) addition in 1916. A second 40,023 ft^{2} (3,718.3 m^{2}) addition was built in 1938 and consisted of an auditorium, a full-size gymnasium, and theater seating. The final 27,568 ft^{2} (2,561.2 m^{2}) addition was completed in 1953, giving the school a total area of 100,714 ft^{2} (9,356.6 m^{2}).

Myron T. Herrick, 42nd Governor of Ohio (1904-1906) and twice United States Ambassador to France (1912-1914 & 1921-1929), attended high school at the Wellington Union School.

On December 14, 2015, the building was demolished. The original school no longer stands, and a new McCormick Middle School was constructed adjacent to Wellington High School.

=== Telescope and Observatory ===
1922 saw the addition of an astronomical observatory with a 4-inch Bausch & Lomb refracting telescope. These items were gifts from the Wellington Alumni Association in memory of Prof. R.H. Kinnison, a former Superintendent of Wellington Schools. His hobbies included astronomy and related sciences. The total cost was quoted at $2,250, which included the observatory tower, telescope/mount and various accessories. The agreed location for this memorial was on the roof of the 1916 addition.

=== 1938 Classroom/Auditorium Addition ===
In 1938, 15 new classrooms and an auditorium/gymnasium were approved by the Board of Education. The proposed total cost was $194,402 with $85,612 (45%) coming from a Federal Public Works Administration (P.W.A.) grant listed under "P.W.A. - Docket-No. OH-1673 F" and the remaining amount collected from a bond issue, which voters passed during a special election on August 6, 1938. The project formally started on July 22, 1938 and was completed September 5, 1939.

=== Architect ===
The additions were designed by Cleveland architect, Harry A. Fulton. During his career, Fulton was known as the "dean of school architects". He designed many school buildings in Cleveland and northeast Ohio. Henrietta, Avon, Brownhelm and Columbia Schools in Lorain County, all built between 1921 - 1922, were designed by the architectural firm of Fulton, Taylor and Cahill.

== Gallery ==
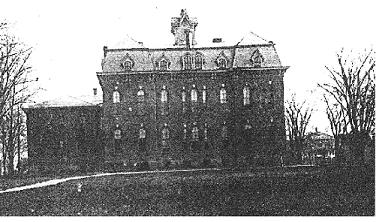
Original Wellington Union School

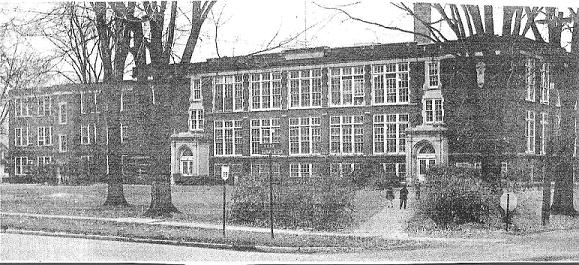
Old McCormick High School

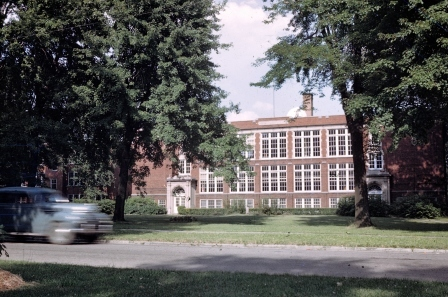
Color McCormick with Observatory

Proposed 1938 Additions

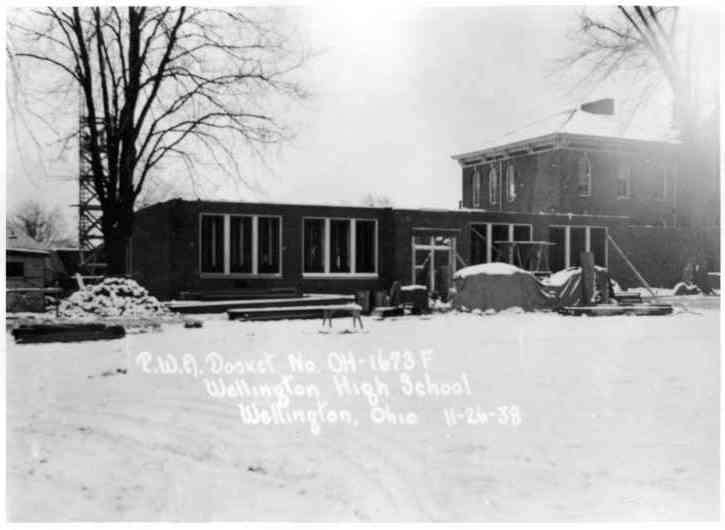
Wellington High School - 1938 Addition

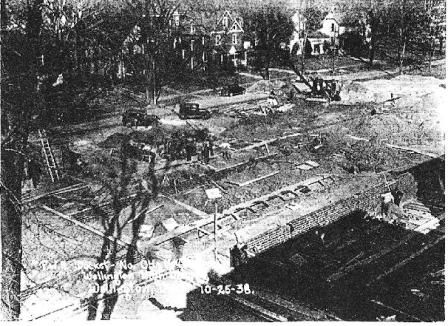
McCormick 1938 Addition and Auditorium

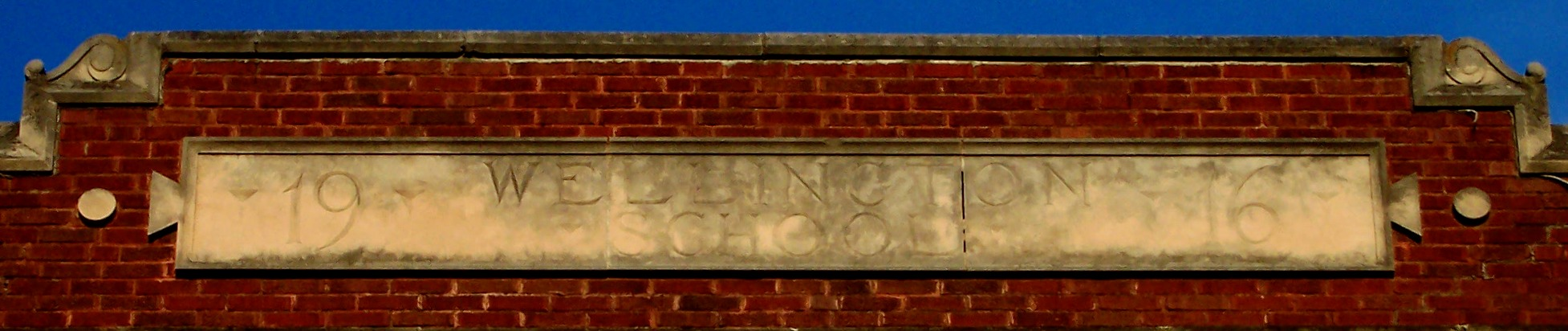
Wellington School - 1916

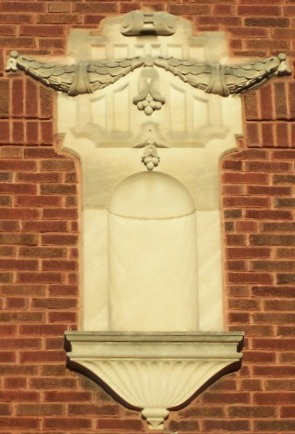
McCormick Design Work

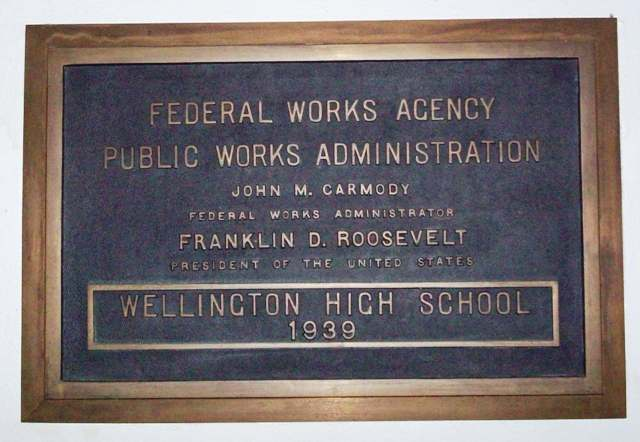
Wellington High School - PWA Plaque

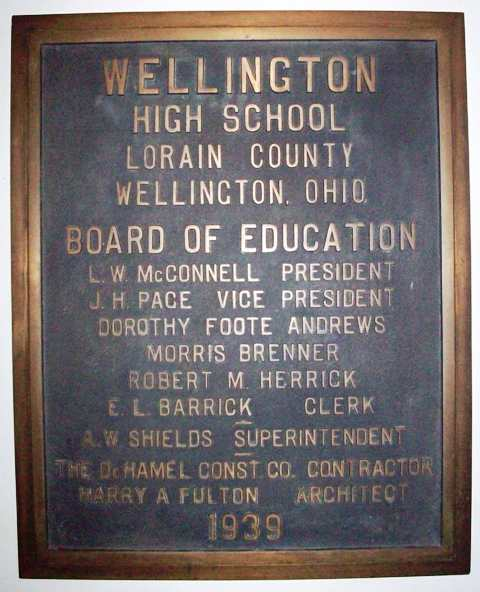
Wellington High School - Plaque
