= War Industries Board =

United States government agency

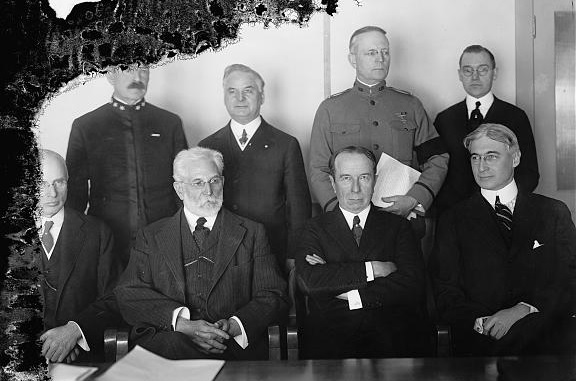

Agency overview
- Formed: July 28, 1917
- Dissolved: January 1, 1919
- Headquarters: Washington D.C.

The War Industries Board (WIB) was a United States government agency established on July 28, 1917, during World War I, to coordinate the purchase of war supplies between the War Department (Department of the Army) and the Navy Department. Because the United States Department of Defense (The Pentagon) would only come into existence in 1947, this was an ad hoc construction to promote cooperation between the Army and the Navy (with regard to procurement), it was founded by the Council of National Defense (which on its turn came into existence by the appropriation bill of August 1916). The War Industries Board was preceded by the General Munitions Board —which didn't have the authority it needed and was later strengthened and transformed into the WIB.

Under the War Industries Board, industrial production in the U.S. increased 20 percent. However, the vast majority of the war material was produced too late to do any good.

Despite its relatively brief existence, the WIB was a major step in the development of national planning and government-business cooperation in the United States, and its precedents —like the National Recovery Administration— were influential during the New Deal and World War II.

== Members of the War Industries Board ==
The original seven members of the War Industries Board were:

- Frank A. Scott (1873–1949), chairman
- Bernard M. Baruch
- Robert S. Brookings, head of the Cupples Co., a distribution firm
- Robert S. Lovett, President of Union Pacific Railroad
- Hugh Frayne, of the American Federation of Labor and former president of the Pennsylvania AFL-CIO
- Army Brigadier General Palmer E. Pierce
- Admiral Frank F. Fletcher

Other later members included:

- Major General James B. Aleshire, Army member of the priorities committee
- Chandler P. Anderson, special counsel on international affairs
- George Newell Armsby, member of the priorities committee
- Lewis R. Atwood, chief of the paint and pigment section
- Captain Clarence Bamberger, assistant chief of forgings, guns, etc., section
- Ollie Josephine Prescott Baird Bennett
- Robert J. Bulkley, chief of legal section
- Samuel P. Bush, chief of ordnance (small arms, ammunition)
- Anthony Caminetti, member of war prison labor and national waste reclamation section
- March F. Chase (1876–1935), director of explosives division
- Coker Fifield Clarkson, member of the automotive products section
- William L. Clayton, member of cotton distribution committee
- John Lee Coulter, staff expert, division of planning and statistics
- William Byron Colver, member of the price fixing committee
- Charles H. Conner, chief of platinum section, wood chemical section and gold and silver section
- John M. Curran, member of conservation division
- Clarence Dillon, partner in Dillon, Read & Co.
- Charles Edgar (1862–1922), director of lumber
- Colonel George Henson Estes, Army representative, requirements division
- Felix Frankfurter, Labor Department representative on priorities board
- Harry Augustus Garfield, member of the price fixing committee
- Edwin Francis Gay, chairman, planning and statistics division
- Army General George Washington Goethals (became a member in 1918)
- Joseph F. Guffey, chief of petroleum section
- Commander John Milton Hancock, Navy member of the price fixing committee
- Charles P. Howland, member of the priorities committee
- Brigadier General Hugh S. Johnson
- Colonel Charles Keller, joint national power administrator
- Victor L. King, chairman of the dye section
- Henry Krumb, member of the priorities committee
- Alexander Legge, selected by President Woodrow Wilson as vice chairman after the reorganization in March 1918
- Charles Kenneth Leith, chief of mica section and mineral import-export advisor
- Isador Lubin, staff expert, division of planning and statistics
- Charles H. MacDowell (1867–1954), director of chemical division
- Rear Admiral Newton E. Mason, Navy member of the priorities committee
- Joseph A. McDonald, staff expert, steel division
- Rear Admiral Samuel McGowan, Navy representative, conservation division
- Eugene Meyer, Special Advisor to the War Industries Board on Non-Ferrous Metals
- Wesley Clair Mitchell, chief of price statistics
- Lieutenant Colonel Robert Hiester Montgomery, Army member of the price fixing committee
- Herbert R. Moody (1868–1947), chief of the technical branch of the chemistry division
- R. V. Norris (1864–1928), representative of U.S. Fuel Administration on the price-fixing commission
- P. B. Noyes, Fuel Administration representative on requirements division and priorities board
- Edwin B. Parker, head of priorities division
- Herbert E. Peabody (died 1930), head of woolen goods section, textile and rubber division
- George N. Peek, commissioner of finished products
- Thomas Nelson Perkins (1870–1937), member of priorities commission and chief council
- Charles Piez, Emergency Fleet Corporation representative on priorities board
- Thomas C. Powell, manager of inland traffic and member of the priorities committee
- J. Leonard Replogle, director of steel supply
- Albert C. Ritchie, general counsel
- Adolph G. Rosengarten (1870–1946), chief of miscellaneous chemical section
- Hugh W. Sanford (1879–1961), chief of the ferro-alloys section
- Jacob F. Schoellkopf Jr. (1858–1942), member of chemical division
- Arch Wilkinson Shaw, head of conservation division
- Edward Stettinius Sr., partner in J.P. Morgan & Co.
- Walter W. Stewart, staff member, division of planning and statistics
- George Cameron Stone, head of Non-Ferrous Metal section
- Henry Carter Stuart, member of the price fixing committee
- Leland L. Summers, technical advisor and chair of Foreign Mission
- Herbert Bayard Swope, assistant to Bernard Baruch
- Frank William Taussig, member of the price fixing committee
- Samuel M. Vauclain, chairman, special advisory subcommittee on plants and munitions
- Edward R. Weidlein, technical advisor, chemical division
- Louis S. Weiss, member of legal section
- Theodore Whitmarsh
- Daniel Willard (1861–1942), chairman of the War Industries Board
- Harrison Williams, member of facilities division
- Major Seth Williams, Marine Corps Representative to the Board (Requirements Division); Future Quartermaster of the Marine Corps in 1937-1944.
- Leo Wolman, staff member, division of planning and statistics
- Pope Yeatman, head, non-ferrous metals division
