= Mary Botsford =

American physician

Mary Elizabeth Botsford (1865–1939) was one of the first physician anesthesiologists in the United States. She began practicing medicine in 1897 and was the chief anesthesiologist at the University of California San Francisco (UCSF). She is believed to be the first female anesthesiologist in the US and the first anesthesiologist in California.

== Career ==
Botsford graduated from the University of California medical school (now UCSF) in 1896 and trained at the Children's Hospital of San Francisco. She began practicing the following year as one of the country's first physician anesthesiologists.

In 1931, she became first faculty anesthesiologist at UCSF. She was the first to use divinyl oxide as an anesthetic in surgery, during a hysterectomy in January 1932. Throughout her years of practice, she published her research in medical journals on a variety of anesthesia-related topics. She retired from practicing medicine in 1934.

During World War I, she served in the US Army as a Contract Surgeon of the Medical Corps at Letterman Army Hospital.

Botsford is credited with getting a state law passed requiring anesthesia to be taught in medical schools in California.

== Personal life ==
Botsford was born on March 25, 1865, in San Francisco, CA, and died June 18, 1939.

Botsford's husband was reported to be deceased before she began studying medicine, but her husband was found to be living and practicing medicine in San Francisco until he died in 1905. In the 1900 census, she is listed as divorced, while she is listed as widowed in the census of 1910.
