= United States Fuel Administration =

WWI-era U.S. federal agency tasked with conserving coal and oil

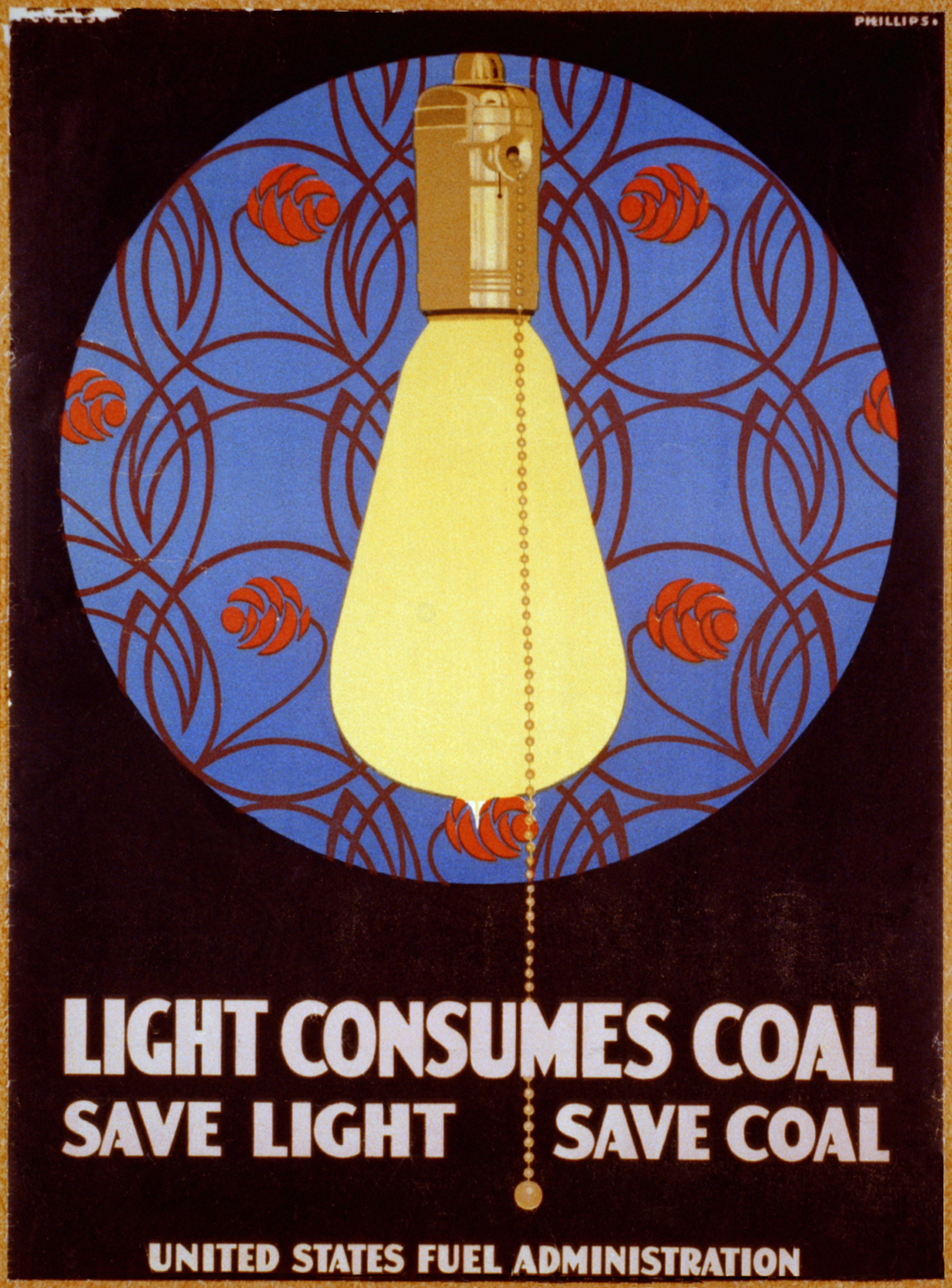
Coles Phillips poster for the United States Fuel Administration

The United States Fuel Administration was a World War I-era agency of the Federal government of the United States established by Executive Order 2690 of August 23, 1917, pursuant to the Food and Fuel Control Act. The administration managed the use of coal and oil. To conserve energy, it introduced daylight saving time, shortened work weeks for civilian goods factories, and encouraged Heatless Mondays.

== Background ==
Even prior to a declaration of war by the United States, shortages of coal were experienced in the winter of 1916-17. To address concerns about a steady supply of fuel to support military and industrial operations and for use by consumers, in 1917 the Federal Fuel Administration was established and US President Woodrow Wilson appointed Harry A. Garfield to lead the agency. Garfield in turn selected local administrators for each state. Fuel committees were organized down to the county level.

The activities of the administration included setting and enforcing the prices of coal. The administration had broad powers to set the price of coal at various points (mine, dock) and the cost of transportation (by rail), and in regard to end use (home, factory, or business, etc.).

Daylight Saving Time was formally adopted in the United States in 1918 by the Fuel Administration. The Standard Time Act of 1918 established both standard time zones and set summer DST to begin on March 31, 1918. The idea was unpopular, however, and Congress abolished DST after the war, overriding President Woodrow Wilson's veto. DST became a local option and was observed in some states until World War II, when President Franklin Roosevelt instituted year-round DST, called "War Time," on February 9, 1942. It lasted until the last Sunday in September 1945. The next year, many states and localities adopted summer DST. By mid-1922, the administration's activities were declining and some states were taking a more active role in managing coal production.

== See also ==
- 1918-20 New York City rent strikes § 1918
