= Alexander Legge =

American businessman (1866–1933)

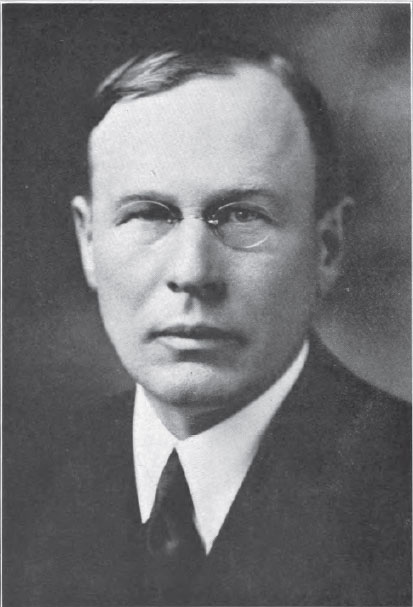
- Born: January 13, 1866; Dane County, Wisconsin, U.S.
- Died: December 3, 1933 (aged 67); Hinsdale, Illinois, U.S.
- Spouse: Katherine McMahon Hall (m. 1908; died 1924)

Alexander Legge (January 13, 1866 – December 3, 1933) was a prominent American business executive, serving as president of International Harvester from 1922 to 1933. He performed public service during World War I on the War Industries Board and at the Versailles Peace Conference, and again during the Great Depression on the Federal Farm Board.

== Early life ==
Legge was born January 13, 1866, in Dane County, Wisconsin, to Alexander and Christine (née Fraser) Legge. His parents and older sister Christina had emigrated to Wisconsin from Scotland in 1857. Legge and his family moved to Colfax County, Nebraska, in 1876 where his father went into the cattle business. Legge worked with his father in farming and later tried his hand as a cowboy in Wyoming. Because of a lung condition, Legge was forced to find a job that would allow him to be outdoors, but would not expose him to dust or extremely cold temperatures.

== Career with International Harvester ==
In 1891, Legge went to work as a collector for the McCormick Harvesting Machine Company branch office in Omaha, Nebraska. He got to know Harold Fowler McCormick when Harold took over the management of the business in the Nebraska area. In 1899, Harold McCormick returned to Chicago to become vice president of the McCormick Company. He called Legge to Chicago and appointed him head of McCormick's worldwide claims collection division. In 1902, when McCormick was merged into the International Harvester Company Legge was promoted first to assistant manager of sales and then general manager of the new company.

In 1919, Harold McCormick was elected president of the International Harvester Company. In 1922, Harold McCormick resigned the presidency to become chairman of the board of directors. At this point, Legge was elected president of the International Harvester Company (he held the position until his death in 1933). That same year he successfully defended the company in an anti-trust suit, allowing them to retain a dominant position in the farming industry. Standardization of farm implements was another major contribution he made during his tenure.

== Other ventures ==
In 1917, President Woodrow Wilson selected Legge as vice chairman of the War Industries Board. When the war ended, he was part of the mission developing the economic section of the Treaty of Versailles. In 1923 Legge was awarded the Distinguished Service Medal.

From July 1929 to March 1931, Legge served as chairman of the Federal Farm Board under President Herbert Hoover.

Before Legge's death, he and his friend Frank Lowden, the former Illinois governor, established the Farm Foundation. Part of Legge's estate was used to fund and launch this foundation in 1933.

== Family ==
Legge married Katherine McMahon Hall in 1908; they had no children. In 1916 Legge bought 53 acres (210,000 m^{2}) of land from the Enos M. Barton estate. He started construction on a large house, but had to abandon the project when the U.S. entered into World War I and subsequently banned private building. About 1921, the construction of their dream home on 53 acres (210,000 m^{2}) essentially abandoned. The Legges bought a large house in Hinsdale, Illinois, where they continued to entertain until Katherine's death in 1924.

In 1923 Legge became very ill during an antitrust suit. He was hospitalized in California. Katherine spent most of her time with him, and thus catching her meals "on the fly" from area restaurants. She contracted typhoid. Katherine died in 1924. After his wife's death, Legge took the 53 acres (210,000 m^{2}) of land and established the Katherine Legge Memorial. This property was used as a retreat devoted to rest, recreation and welfare for women employed at International Harvester. A lodge was built on the property in 1927 (designed by Harold Zook).

Legge died on December 3, 1933, at his home in Hinsdale, Illinois. Services were held at the Fourth Presbyterian Church at 880 North Michigan Avenue, Chicago, on December 6, 1933. His ashes were taken to the Katherine Legge Memorial to be interred with his wife's ashes.
