= Patriot Athletic Conference (Ohio) =

The Patriot Athletic Conference (PAC-12) was an Ohio high school athletic league made up of 12 schools from around the Cleveland area that existed from 2005-2006 to the 2018-2019 school year. All member schools were also members of the Ohio High School Athletic Association.

== Members ==
The following were members over the league's tenure:

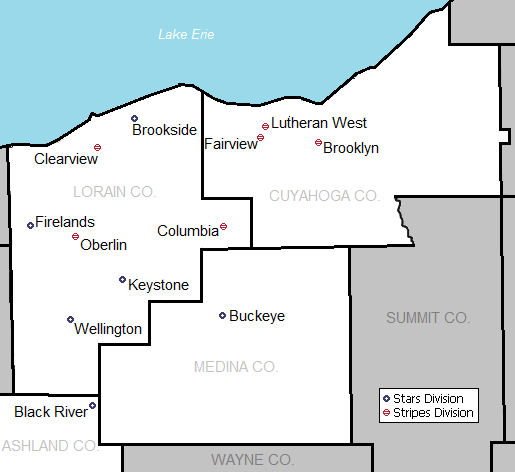

School	Nickname	Location	District	Colors	Middle school	Tenure
Stars Division
Black River	Pirates	Sullivan	5:15	Black, Gold	Black River Middle School	2005-2020
Brookside	Cardinals	Sheffield	4:12	Red, Black	Sheffield Middle School	2005-2020
Buckeye	Bucks	Mallet Creek	3:8	Brown, Orange, White	Buckeye Junior High	2005-2019
Firelands	Falcons	Oberlin	4:12	Red, White, Black	South Amherst Middle School	2011-2020
Keystone	Wildcats	LaGrange	4:12	Purple, White	Keystone Middle School	2005-2020
Wellington	Dukes	Wellington	5:16	Maroon, White	McCormick Middle School	2005-2020
Stripes Division
Brooklyn	Hurricanes	Brooklyn	3:8	Blue, Gold	Brooklyn Middle School	2005-2019
Clearview	Clippers	Lorain	4:12	Blue, Gold	Durling Middle School	2005-2020
Columbia	Raiders	Columbia Station	5:16	Kelly Green, White	Columbia Middle School	2005-2020
Fairview	Warriors	Fairview Park	4:11	Scarlet, Gray	Lewis F. Mayer Middle School	2011-2019
Lutheran West	Longhorns	Rocky River	5:15	Red, White		2005-2019
Oberlin	Phoenix	Oberlin	6:19	Red, Blue	Langston Middle School	2005-2020

== League history ==
The league was formed in 2005 from members of the Mohican Area Conference (Black River and Buckeye), the Lorain County Conference (Brookside, Clearview, Keystone, Oberlin, and Wellington), and the Metropolitan Area Conference (Brooklyn, Columbia, and Lutheran West). Firelands and Fairview joined in 2011.

In 2017, the eight primarily Lorain County schools (Brookside, Clearview, Columbia, Firelands, Keystone, Oberlin, and Wellington, as well as Black River) announced they would leave the PAC in 2020 to form their own league.

In response to the league's imminent dissolution, Brooklyn and Lutheran West were accepted by a league-wide vote in April 2018 to join the Chagrin Valley Conference in 2019-20.

In May 2018, Buckeye and Fairview were approved to join the Great Lakes Conference for the 2019-20 school year as their eighth and ninth members.

The new league with the eight predominantly Lorain County schools would choose the name of Lorain County League and began league play with the 2019-20 school year.

== See also ==
- Ohio high school athletic conferences
- Ohio High School Athletic Association
