= OHSAA Northeast Region athletic conferences =

High school athletic conferences

This is a list of high school athletic conferences in the Northeast Region of Ohio, as defined by the OHSAA. Because the names of localities and their corresponding high schools do not always match and because there is often a possibility of ambiguity with respect to either the name of a locality or the name of a high school, the following table gives both in every case, with the locality name first, in plain type, and the high school name second in boldface type. The school's team nickname is given last.

== Akron City Series ==
- Akron **Buchtel** Griffins (1931–)
- Akron **East** Dragons (1918–)
- Akron **Ellet** Orangemen (1971–)
- Akron **Firestone** Falcons (1963–)
- Akron **Garfield** Golden Rams (2017–)
- Akron **North** Vikings (1915–)

Former members

- Akron **Central** Wildcats (1915–1970, consolidated into Central-Hower)
- Akron **Central-Hower** Eagles (1970–2006, school closed)
- Akron **Hower** Buccaneers (1927–1970, consolidated into Central-Hower)
- Akron **Kenmore** Cardinals (1929–2017, consolidated into Kenmore–Garfield)
- Akron **South** Cavaliers/Big Blue (1915–1980, school closed)
- Akron **West** Cowboys (1915–1953, school closed)

== All-American Conference ==
- **Austintown-Fitch** Falcons (2011– [Independent in Football)
- Youngstown **Boardman** Spartans (2014– [Independent in Football)
- **Canfield** Cardinals (2008–[Independent in Football)
- Warren **Howland** Tigers (2008–[In Eastern Buckeye Conference for Football)
- **Louisville** Leopards (2026–[Independent in Football)
- **Warren G. Harding** Raiders (2014–[Independent in Football)

Former members

- **Salem** Quakers (2008–2011, to Northeastern Buckeye Conference)
- Lisbon **Beaver Local** Beavers (played concurrently in OVAC, 2008–2013, to Buckeye 8 Athletic League, Red Division 2008–11, American Division 2011–13.)
- **Girard** Indians (2008–2018, to Northeast 8 Conference)
- **Hubbard** Eagles (2008–2018, to Northeast 8 Conference)
- **Jefferson Area** Falcons (2011–2018, to Northeast 8 Conference)
- Cortland **Lakeview** Bulldogs (2008–2018, to Northeast 8 Conference)
- **Niles McKinley** Red Dragons (2008–2018, to Northeast 8 Conference)
- Poland **Poland Seminary** Bulldogs (2008–2018, to Northeast 8 Conference)
- **Struthers** Wildcats (2008–2018, to Northeast 8 Conference)
- Ashtabula **Edgewood** Warriors (2014–2019, to Chagrin Valley Conference)
- Ashtabula **Lakeside** Dragons (2015–2019, to Chagrin Valley Conference)
- Youngstown **East** Golden Bears (2014–19, to Steel Valley Conference)
- **Brookfield** Warriors (2014–2020, to Mahoning Valley Athletic Conference)
- Campbell **Memorial** Red Devils (2008–2020, to Mahoning Valley Athletic Conference)
- **Champion** Golden Flashes (2008–2020, to Mahoning Valley Athletic Conference)
- Columbiana **Crestview** Rebels (2019–2020, to Mahoning Valley Athletic Conference)
- Leavittsburg **LaBrae** Vikings (2008–2020, to Mahoning Valley Athletic Conference)
- **Liberty** Leopards (2008–2020, to Mahoning Valley Athletic Conference)
- **Newton Falls** Tigers (2008–2020, to Mahoning Valley Athletic Conference)

== Chagrin Valley Conference ==
Chagrin Division

- Ashtabula **Edgewood** Warriors (2019–)
- Gates Mills **Hawken** Hawks (1996–)
- **Geneva** Eagles (2015–)
- **Jefferson Area** Falcons (2023–)
- Pepper Pike **Orange** Lions (1964–1996, 1998–)
- **Perry** Pirates (1996–)
- Chesterland **West Geauga** Wolverines (1963–1996, 1998–)

Metro Division

- **Brooklyn** Hurricanes (2019–)
- **Beachwood** Bison (2005–)
- **Cuyahoga Heights** Red Wolves (2005–)
- **Independence** Blue Devils (2005–)
- **Richmond Heights** Spartans (2005–[Independent in boys basketball)
- Fairport Harbor **Fairport Harding** (2005–2020; 2026)
- Garfield Heights **Trinity** Trojans (2019–)
- **Wickliffe** Blue Devils (1980–)

Valley Division

- Burton **Berkshire** Badgers (1996–)
- **Conneaut** Spartans (2019–)
- **Kirtland** Hornets (1996–)
- **Crestwood** Red Devils (2020–)
- **Chagrin Falls** Tigers (1964–)
- **Fairview** Warriors (2023–)
- **Rootstown** Rovers (2025–)

Lake Division

- **Chardon** Hilltoppers (1964–1980; 2026)
- Painesville **Harvey** Red Raiders (2009–)
- Ashtabula **Lakeside** Dragons (2019–)
- **Madison** Blue Streaks (2023–)
- Rocky River **Lutheran West** Longhorns (2019–)
- Eastlake **North** Rangers (2026)
- Willoughby **South** Rebels (2026)

Former members

- **Aurora** Greenmen (1964–1983, to East Suburban, 1996–2015, to Suburban)
- Middlefield **Cardinal** Huskies (1996–2025, to Northeastern Athletic Conference)
- Bainbridge **Kenston** Bombers (1964–1996, to Western Reserve, 2005–2015, to Western Reserve)
- **Newbury** Black Knights (1998–2014, to Northeastern Athletic Conference; school closed in 2020)
- **Solon** Comets (1964–1996, to Western Reserve)
- **Twinsburg** Tigers (1964–1996, to Western Reserve)
- Orwell **Grand Valley** Mustangs (1998–2009, 2019–2024, to Northeastern Athletic Conference)

== Cleveland Senate Athletic League ==
- Cleveland **John Adams** Rebels (1923–95, 2006–)
- Cleveland **Collinwood** Railroaders (1924–)
- Cleveland **East Technical** Scarabs (1908–)
- Cleveland **Glenville** Tarblooders (1905–)
- Cleveland **Max S. Hayes** Lakers (1957–, no football)
- Cleveland **John F. Kennedy** Fighting Eagles (1966–)
- Cleveland **Lincoln-West** Wolverines (1961–)
- Cleveland **John Marshall** Lawyers (1936–)
- Cleveland **James F. Rhodes** Rams (1936–)
- Cleveland **John Hay** Hornets (1936–)

Former members

- Cleveland **Martin Luther King, Jr.** Crusaders (1972–2018, no football)
- Cleveland **Aviation** Thunderbirds (1965–95)
- Cleveland **Benedictine** Bengals (1936–72)
- Cleveland **Cathedral Latin** Lions (1936–67)
- Cleveland **Central** Trojans (1904–52)
- Cleveland **East** Blue Bombers (1904–2010)
- Parma Heights **Holy Name** Green Wave (1936–67)
- Cleveland **Jane Addams** Executives (1985–2012)
- Cleveland **Lincoln** Wolverines (1936–70)
- Cleveland **St. Ignatius** Wildcats (1936–67)
- Cleveland **South** Flyers (1904–2010)
- Cleveland **West** Cowboys (1904–61)
- Cleveland **West Technical** Warriors (1904–95)
- Cleveland **Whitney M. Young** Warriors (2004–2018)

== Cleveland West Conference ==
- **Bay Village** Bay Rockets (2024–)
- **Buckeye** Bucks (2024–)
- **Lakewood** Rangers (2024–)
- **North Olmsted** Eagles (2024–)
- Parma **Normandy** Invaders (2024–)
- Parma Heights **Valley Forge** Patriots (2024–)
- **Rocky River** Pirates (2024–)
- **Westlake** Demons (2024–)

== Eastern Buckeye Conference ==
- **Alliance** Aviators (2018–)
- **Carrollton** Warriors (2018–)
- **Howland** Tigers (2026–;football only)
- Lexington Township **Marlington** Dukes (2018–)
- **Minerva** Lions (2018–)
- **Salem** Quakers (2018–)
- Beloit **West Branch** Warriors (2018–)

=== Former members ===
- **Canton South** Wildcats (2018–2021 to Principals)

== Eastern Ohio Athletic Conference ==
- **Columbiana** Clippers (2017–)
- Lisbon **David Anderson** Blue Devils (2017–)
- **East Palestine** Bulldogs (2017–)
- Salineville **Southern Local** Indians (2017–)
- Hanoverton **United** Golden Eagles (2017–)
- **Wellsville** Tigers (2017–)
- Youngstown **Valley Christian** Eagles (2020–)

Former members

- **Toronto** Red Knights (2017–2019, concurrent with OVAC)
- **Leetonia** Bears (2017–2026; to Northeastern Athletic Conference)

=== Future members ===
- Berlin Center **Western Reserve** Blue Devils (2027)

== Federal League ==
- Canton **McKinley** Bulldogs (2003– Football 2004-)
- Plain **GlenOak** Golden Eagles (1975–)
- **Green** Bulldogs (2015-)
- **Jackson** Polar Bears (1964–)
- **Lake** Blue Streaks (1987–)
- North Canton **Hoover** Vikings (1968–)
- **Perry** Panthers (1964–)

Former members

- **Canton South** Wildcats (1964–1990, to Northeastern Buckeye)
- Navarre **Fairless** Falcons (1964–1976, to All-Ohio)
- Canton **Glenwood** Eagles (1964–1975, consolidated into GlenOak)
- Lexington **Marlington** Dukes (1964–1985, to Senate)
- Magnolia **Sandy Valley** Cardinals (1964–1968, to Senate)
- **Louisville** Leopards (1968–1990, to Northeastern Buckeye)
- Canton **Oakwood** Golden Raiders (1968–1975, consolidated into GlenOak)
- **Alliance** Aviators (1983–2003, to Metro Athletic)
- **New Philadelphia** Quakers (1987–1997, to East Central Ohio)
- Canton **Timken** Trojans (1987–1995)
- **Wooster** Generals (1987–2003, to Ohio Cardinal)
- **Austintown-Fitch** Falcons (2003–2011, to All-American football 2004-2011)
- **Boardman** Spartans (2003–2012, football 2004-2014)

== Greater Cleveland Conference ==
- **Brunswick** Blue Devils (2015–)
- **Cleveland Heights** Tigers (2023–)
- **Euclid** Panthers (2015–)
- **Lorain** Titans (2025–)
- **Mentor** Cardinals (2015–)
- Painesville Township **Riverside** Beavers (2026–)
- **Shaker Heights** Red Raiders (2023–)
- **Strongsville** Mustangs (2015–)

=== Former members ===
Medina Bees (2015–2026; to Suburban)

== Independents ==
The following schools currently do not compete in an athletic conference as of the 2025–26 school year:

- Willoughby **Andrews Osbourne Academy** Phoenix (no football)
- Akron **Archbishop Hoban** Knights
- Cleveland **Bard Early College** Raptors (no football)
- Cleveland **Benedictine** Bengals
- Youngstown **Cardinal Mooney** Cardinals
- Canton **Central Catholic** Crusaders
- **Cleveland Central Catholic** Ironmen
- Willoughby **Cornerstone Christian** Patriots (no football)
- Beachwood **Fuchs Mizrachi** Mayhem (no football)
- Gates Mills **Gilmour Academy** Lancers
- Shaker Heights **Hathaway Brown School** Blazers (girls' only; no football)
- Canton **Heritage Christian School** Conquerors (no football)
- Columbiana **Heartland Christian School** Lions (no football)
- Canton **Heritage Christian School** Conquerors (no football)
- Warren **John F. Kennedy** Eagles
- Lake Township **Lake Center Christian** Tigers (no football)
- North Ridgeville **Lake Ridge Academy** Royals (no football)
- Shaker Heights **Laurel School** Gators (girls' only; no football)
- Cleveland Heights **Lutheran East** Falcons
- Rocky River **Magnificat** Blue Streaks (girls' only; no football)
- **Mogadore** Wildcats
- Elyria **Open Door Christian** Patriots (no football)
- **Richmond Heights** Spartans
- East Cleveland **Shaw** Cardinals
- Lakewood **St. Edward** Eagles
- Cleveland **St. Joseph Academy** Jaguars (girls' only; no football)
- Cleveland **St. Ignatius** Wildcats
- Louisville **St. Thomas Aquinas** Knights
- Akron **St. Vincent-St. Mary** Fighting Irish
- Hunting Valley **University** Preppers
- Youngstown **Ursuline** Fighting Irish
- Cleveland **Villa Angela-St. Joseph** Vikings
- Massillon **Washington** Tigers

== Lorain County League/Conference ==
- Sullivan **Black River** Pirates (2019-)
- Sheffield **Brookside** Cardinals (2019-)
- Lorain **Clearview** Clippers (2019-)
- Columbia Station **Columbia** Raiders (2019-)
- Oberlin **Firelands** Falcons (2019-)
- LaGrange **Keystone** Wildcats (2019-)
- **Oberlin** Phoenix (2019-)
- **Wellington** Dukes (2019-)

== Mahoning Valley Athletic Conference ==
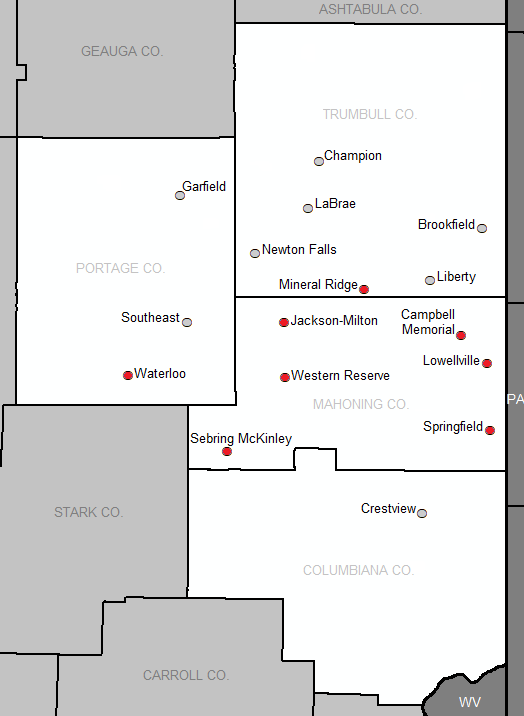
Map of the Mahoning Valley Athletic Conference's members.

Grey Tier

- **Brookfield** Warriors (2020–)
- Warren **Champion** Golden Flashes (2020–)
- Columbiana **Crestview** Rebels (2020–)
- Garrettsville **Garfield** G-Men (2021-)
- Leavittsburg **LaBrae** Vikings (2020–)
- Youngstown **Liberty** Leopards (2020–)
- **Newton Falls** Tigers (2020–)
- Ravenna **Southeast** Pirates (2024-)

Scarlet Tier

- North Jackson **Jackson-Milton** Blue Jays (2017–)
- **Lowellville** Rockets (2017–)
- **McDonald** Blue Devils (2017–)
- Sebring **McKinley** Trojans (2017–)
- Campbell **Memorial** Red Devils (2020–)
- **Mineral Ridge** Rams (2017–)
- New Middletown **Springfield** Tigers (2017–)
- Atwater **Waterloo** Vikings (2017–)
- Berlin Center **Western Reserve** Blue Devils (2017–)

== Metro Athletic Conference ==
- Westfield Township **Cloverleaf** Colts (2020–)
- **Cuyahoga Falls** Black Tigers (2026–)
- Brimfield **Field** Falcons (2020–)
- **Norton** Panthers (2020–)
- **Ravenna** Ravens (2020–)
- Kent **Roosevelt** Roughriders (2026–)
- Lakemore **Springfield** Spartans (2020–)
- **Streetsboro** Rockets (2020–)
- **Tallmadge** Blue Devils (2026–
- Cuyahoga Falls **Woodridge** Bulldogs (2020–)

Former members

- **Coventry** Comets (2020–2026; to Principals Athletic)

== North Coast Conference ==
- Cleveland Heights **Beaumont School** Blue Streaks (2024–)
- Cleveland **Benedictine** Bengals (2025–)
- Cuyahoga Falls **Cuyahoga Valley Christian Academy** Royals (2024–)
- **Elyria Catholic** Panthers (2024–)
- Mentor **Lake Catholic** Cougars (2024–)
- Chardon **Notre Dame-Cathedral Latin** Lions (2024–)
- Parma **Padua Franciscan** Bruins (2024–)

=== Future members ===
Rockey River Lutheran West Longhorns (2027)

== Northeast 8 Athletic Conference ==
- **Girard** Indians (2018–)
- **Hubbard** Eagles (2018–)
- Cortland **Lakeview** Bulldogs (2018–)
- **Niles McKinley** Red Dragons (2018–)
- Poland **Poland Seminary** Bulldogs (2018–)
- Canfield **South Range** Raiders (2018–)
- **Struthers** Wildcats (2018–)

=== Future members ===
- **Salem** Quakers (2027)

=== Former members ===
- **Jefferson Area** Falcons (2018–2023 to CVC)

== Northeastern Athletic Conference ==
=== Stars Division ===
- Middlefield **Cardinal** Huskies (2025–)
- Orwell **Grand Valley** Mustangs (2009–2019; 2024–)
- Vienna **Mathews** Mustangs (2003–; football 2009–)
- Andover **Pymatuning Valley** Lakers (2002–; football 2009–)
- Ashtabula **St. John** Fighting Heralds (2022–)
- Cortland **Maplewood** Rockets (2002–)

=== Stripes Division ===
- Kinsman **Badger** Braves (2003–)
- North Bloomfield **Bloomfield** Cardinals (2002–)
- Bristolville **Bristol** Panthers (2002–)
- Southington **Chalker** Wildcats (2002–; football 2009–2020)
- **Leetonia** Bears (2026–)
- **Lordstown** Red Devils (2002–)
- **Windham** Bombers (2013–; football 2013–2025)

Former members

- Fairport Harbor **Fairport Harding** Skippers (2020–2026; to Chagrin Valley Conference)
- Cleveland Heights **Lutheran East** Falcons (2009–2012 football only; moved to freelance)
- Thompson **Ledgemont** Redskins (2008–2015; school closed)
- **Newbury** Black Knights (2014–2020; school closed)

Future members

- **Brookfield** Warriors (2027)
- **Champion** Flashes (2027)
- Leavittsburg **LaBrae** Vikings (2027)
- **Liberty** Leopards (2027)

== Northern 8 Football Conference ==
- Southington **Chalker** Wildcats (2024–)
- Lakeside **Danbury** Lakers (2020–)
- **Holgate** Tigers (2020–)
- Hermitage **Kennedy Catholic** Eagles (2026–)
- **Plymouth** Big Red (2026–)
- Sandusky **St. Mary Central Catholic** Panthers (2021–)
- Fremont **St. Joseph Central Catholic** Crimson Streaks (2024–)
- Sebring **McKinley** Trojans (2024–)
- **Stryker** Panthers (2020–)
- **Windham** Bombers (2026–)

=== Former members ===
- **Toledo Christian** Eagles (2020–2025); returned to 11-man football in 2025
- Oregon **Cardinal Stritch** Cardinals (2025); 2026 season canceled due to low numbers; school will close in December 2026.

== Principals Athletic Conference ==
- Canton Township **Canton South** Wildcats (2022–)
- **Coventry** Comets (1989–95; 2001–05; 2026–)
- Navarre **Fairless** Falcons (1989–)
- New Franklin **Manchester** Panthers (1989–)
- Lawrence **Northwest** Indians (2017–)
- **Orrville** Red Riders (2016–)
- Wooster **Triway** Titans (2005–)
- Tuscarawas **Tuslaw** Mustangs (1989–)

=== Future Members ===
- Millersburg **West Holmes** Knights (2028)
- Westfield Township **Cloverleaf** Colts (2028)

Former members

- **East Canton** Hornets (1989–2005, to Portage Trail Conference)
- Gnadenhutten **Indian Valley** Braves (1992–95, 2008–16, to Inter-Valley Conference)
- Magnolia **Sandy Valley** Cardinals (1989–2001, to Inter-Valley)
- Canton **Timken** Trojans (2005–15, school closed, consolidated with Canton McKinley)
- Zoarville **Tuscarawas Valley** Trojans (1989–2017, to Inter-Valley Conference)
- Cuyahoga Falls **Cuyahoga Valley Christian Academy** Royals (2001–2024, to North Coast Conference)
- **Loudonville** Redbirds (2017–2021 Football only member, left for Knox Morrow Athletic Conference)

== Southwestern Conference ==
- **Avon** Eagles (2015–)
- **Avon Lake** Shoremen (1964–)
- **Berea-Midpark** Titans (2013–)
- **Elyria** Pioneers (2021–)
- Grafton **Midview** Middies (2015–)
- **North Ridgeville** Rangers (2015–)
- **Olmsted Falls** Bulldogs (1954–)
- Amherst **Marion L. Steele** Comets (1947–1958; 1986–)

Former members

- **Berea** Braves (1937–1950, to Greater Cleveland, 2005–13, consolidated into Berea-Midpark)
- **Oberlin** Indians (1937–1964, to Lakeland)
- **Rocky River** Pirates (1937–2005, to West Shore)
- **Fairview** Warriors (1940–2005, to West Shore)
- Lorain **Clearview** Clippers (1945–1954, to Lakeland)
- **Wellington** Dukes (1945–1954, to Lakeland)
- **Medina** Bees (1947–1986, to Pioneer)
- **Bay** Rockets (1954–2005, to West Shore)
- **Brecksville-Broadview Heights** Bees (2005–2015, to Suburban)
- Middleburg Heights and Brook Park **Midpark** Meteors (2005–2013, consolidated into Berea-Midpark)
- **Lakewood** Rangers (2015–2020, to Great Lakes)
- **North Olmsted** Eagles (1954–2021 to Great Lakes
- **Westlake** Demons (1954–2021 to Great Lakes)

== Suburban League ==
American Division

- **Aurora** Greenmen (2015–)
- **Barberton** Magics (2005–2011, 2015–)
- **Copley** Indians (1949–)
- Chagrin Falls **Kenston** Bombers (2026–)
- **Mayfield** Wildcats (2026–)
- Macedonia **Nordonia** Knights (1947–1973, 2011–[In National for football only)
- **Revere** Minutemen (1957–)
- **Twinsburg** Tigers (1957–1964, 2015–)

National Division

- **Brecksville-Broadview Heights** Bees (2015–[American for football only)
- Granger **Highland** Hornets (1976–)
- **Hudson** Explorers (1949–1997, 2015–)
- **Medina** Bees (2026–)
- **North Royalton** Bears (2015–)
- **Solon** Comets (2023–)
- **Twinsburg** Tigers (1957–1964, 2015–)
- **Wadsworth** Grizzlies (1984–)

Former members

- **Green** Bulldogs (1949–2015, to Federal)
- New Franklin **Manchester** Panthers (1949–1976, to All-Ohio)
- **Mogadore** Wildcats (1957–1968, to Portage County)
- Cuyahoga Falls **Woodridge** Bulldogs (1957–1978, to Portage County)
- **Coventry** Comets (1969–1983, to All-Ohio)
- **Norton** Panthers (1972–2005, to Portage Trail-Metro)
- Brimfield **Field** Falcons (1978–1990, to Portage County)
- Westfield **Cloverleaf** Colts (1997–2015, to Portage Trail-Metro)
- Kent **Roosevelt** Rough Riders (2015–2026; to Metro Athletic)
- **Tallmadge** Blue Devils (1990–2026; to Metro Athletic)
- **Cuyahoga Falls** Black Tigers (2015–2026; to Metro Athletic)

== United Athletic Conference ==
- Lyndhurst **Brush** Arcs (2026–)
- **Bedford** Bearcats (2026–)
- **Garfield Heights** Bulldogs (2026–)
- **Maple Heights** Mustangs (2026–)
- **Warrensville Heights** Tigers (2026–)
- **Youngstown** Defenders (2026–football/basketball only)

== Wayne County Athletic League ==
- Doylestown **Chippewa** Chipps (known as Doylestown until 1971; 1924–)
- **Dalton** Bulldogs (1924–)
- Jeromesville **Hillsdale** Falcons (1970–)
- West Salem **Northwestern** Huskies (1951–)
- Creston **Norwayne** Bobcats (1953–)
- **Rittman** Indians (1924–1937, 1961–)
- **Smithville** Smithies (1924–)
- Apple Creek **Waynedale** Golden Bears (1955–)

Former members

- **Apple Creek** Aces (1924–1955, consolidated into Waynedale)
- **Big Prairie** Bobcats (1924–1937, to Holmes County League)
- **Burbank** Bombers (1924–1953, consolidated into Norwayne)
- **Chester** Pups (1924–1951, consolidated into Northwestern)
- **Congress** Senators (1924–1951, consolidated into Northwestern)
- **Creston** Panthers (1924–1951, consolidated into Norwayne)
- **Fredericksburg** Freddies (1924–1955, consolidated into Waynedale)
- **Marshallville** Tigers (1924–1938, consolidated into Dalton, transferred to Smithville 1955)
- Mount Eaton **Paint Township** Pirates (1924–1955, consolidated into Waynedale)
- **Shreve** Trojans (1924–1963, consolidated into Triway)
- **Sterling** Eagles (1924–1953, consolidated into Norwayne)
- **West Salem** Clippers (1924–1951, consolidated into Northwestern)
- Wooster **Triway** Titans (1963–1970, to Chippewa Conference)

== See also ==
- Ohio High School Athletic Association
