= Lorain County Joint Vocational School =

Public school in Ohio, United States

Coordinates: 41°15′45″N 82°12′48″W

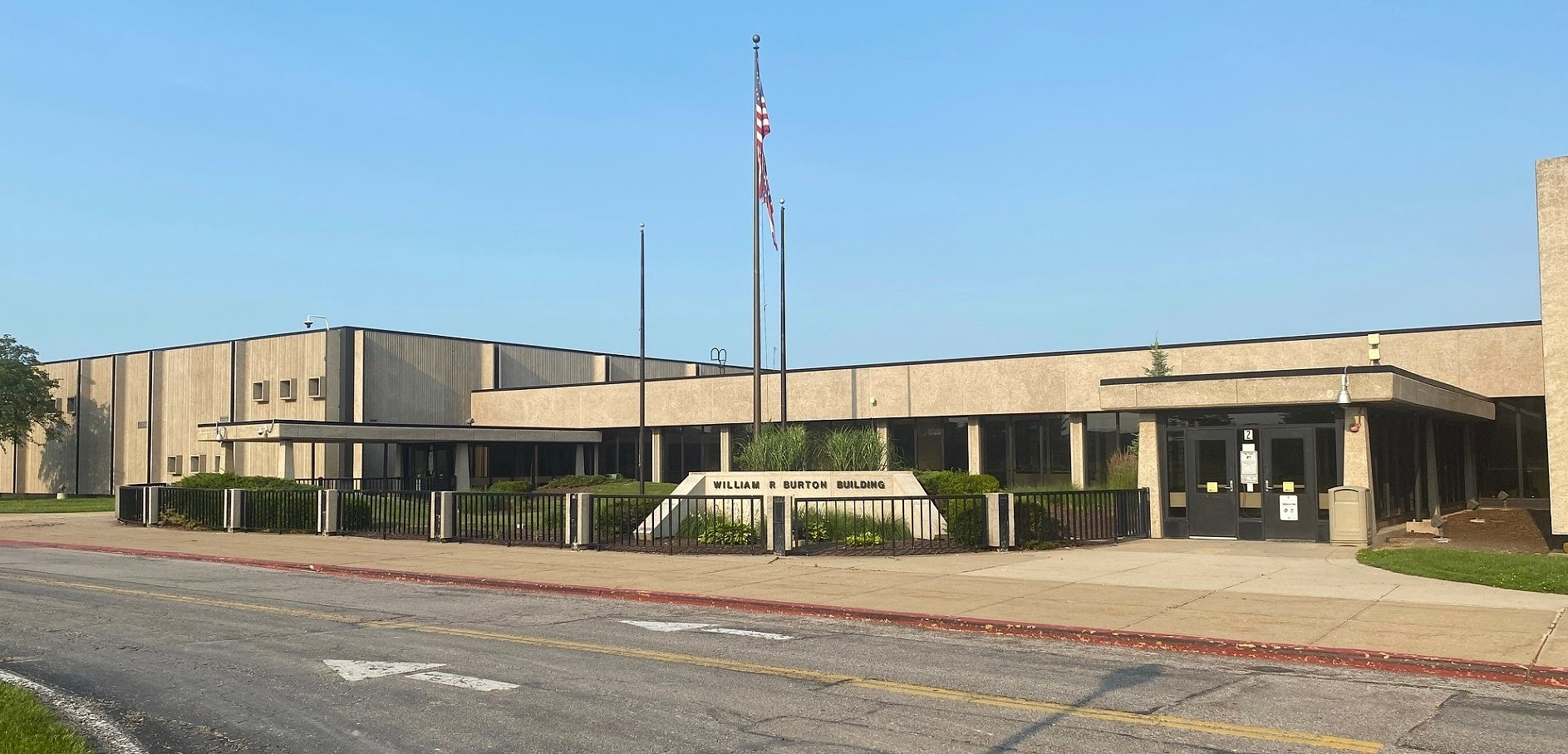
- Type: Public Vocational School
- Established: 1971
- Students: 1,000+
- Location: Oberlin, Ohio, U.S.
- Website: http://www.lcjvs.com/

Lorain County Joint Vocational School is a public vocational school in Oberlin, Ohio. LCJVS primarily serves 13 school districts located in Lorain County, with parts of Erie and Huron counties also covered.

Altogether the school's main campus has an enrollment of about 1,000 high school junior and seniors, while about 300 students study at satellite locations in their member districts. The affiliated Adult Center also has 4,000 students annually.

== Partner schools ==
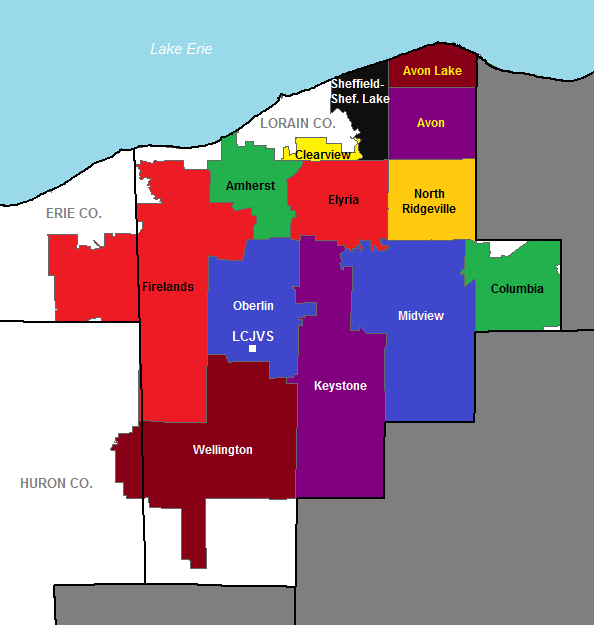
School districts served by Lorain County JVS. The school's location is marked with a white square in Oberlin's school district.

- Amherst Steele High School
- Avon High School
- Avon Lake High School
- Brookside High School (Sheffield-Sheffield Lake City Schools)
- Clearview High School
- Columbia High School
- Elyria High School
- Firelands High School
- Keystone High School
- Midview High School
- North Ridgeville High School
- Oberlin High School
- Wellington High School

== History ==
In the 1960s, Ohio governor James A. Rhodes envisioned joint vocational schools as a way to provide proper technical training for rural school districts that did not offer them as their larger city district counterparts had. Six districts initially made up Lorain County JVS before it expanded to its current 13. In the 1980s, the curriculum expanded to include 23 programs, and after the technological boom in the 1990s, more opportunities arose while partnerships with area colleges provided college credits. A 2,400 sq. ft. greenhouse was eventually added as well.

Along with being ISO 9001:2000 Certified and accredited by the North Central Association, the school is also affiliated with National Institute for Metalworking Skills (NIMS), National Center for Construction Education & Research (NCCER), American Culinary Federation (ACF), Cisco Systems Networking Academy (Cisco), National Institute for Automotive Service Excellence (ASE), and Automotive Yes (AYES).
