= Lorain County League =

The Lorain County League (LC8) is an Ohio high school athletic league that began with the 2019-20 school year and is made up of eight schools predominantly based in Lorain County, Ohio. All schools are members of the Ohio High School Athletic Association. Previous versions of a Lorain County League existed from 1924–61 and again from 1968-2005.

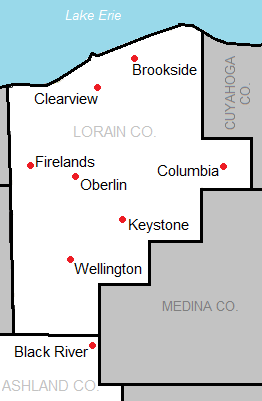

School	Nickname	Location	District	Colors	Middle school	Tenure
Black River	Pirates	Sullivan	5:15	Black, gold	Black River Middle School	2019-
Brookside	Cardinals	Sheffield	4:12	Red, black	Sheffield Middle School	2019-
Clearview	Clippers	Lorain	4:12	Blue, gold	Durling Middle School	2019-
Columbia	Raiders	Columbia Station	5:16	Kelly Green, white	Columbia Middle School	2019-
Firelands	Falcons	Henrietta	4:12	Red, white, black	South Amherst Middle School	2019-
Keystone	Wildcats	LaGrange	4:12	Purple, white	Keystone Middle School	2019-
Oberlin	Phoenix	Oberlin	6:19	Red, blue	Langston Middle School	2019-
Wellington	Dukes	Wellington	5:16	Maroon, white	McCormick Middle School	2019-

== League history ==
The most recent idea for the new LCL was formed in 2017 when the eight primarily Lorain County schools (Brookside, Clearview, Columbia, Firelands, Keystone, Oberlin, and Wellington, as well as Black River) announced they would leave the Patriot Athletic Conference (PAC) to form their own league by 2020.

In response to the PAC's imminent dissolution, Brooklyn and Lutheran West were accepted by a league-wide vote in April 2018 to join the Chagrin Valley Conference in 2019-20.

In May 2018, Buckeye and Fairview were approved to join the Great Lakes Conference for the 2019-20 school year as their eighth and ninth members.

Since the four schools that weren't invited to join the new LC8 were able to leave the PAC after the 2018-19 school year, the LC8 was able to begin a year sooner than anticipated.

=== Previous Lorain County League/Conference memberships ===
The first version of the Lorain County League began in 1924 as one of several small-school county leagues across Ohio. The league survived the consolidation wave until 1961, when the schools who weren't already aligned with the Inland Conference joined the Lakeland Conference. The conference revived itself in 1986 as the Lorain County Conference when the Lakeland Conference collapsed, and the schools banded together for roughly two decades until the schools split, this time to help form the Patriot Athletic and West Shore conferences.

=== First Version (Lorain County League, 1924–61) ===
- Avon Eagles^{1} (1924–61, to Inland)
- Avon Lake Shoremen (1924–1961, to Lakeland)
- Belden Bees (1924–55, consolidated into Midview)
- Brighton Bears (1924–52, consolidated into Wellington)
- Sheffield Brookside Cardinals^{1} (1924–61, to Inland)
- Brownhelm Bombers (1924–52, consolidated into Firelands)
- Kipton Camden Knights (1924–52, consolidated into Firelands)
- Columbia Station Columbia Raiders^{1} (1924–61, to Inland)
- Grafton Eaton Eels (1924–55, consolidated into Midview)
- Grafton Comets (1924–55, consolidated into Midview)
- Henrietta Hawks (1924–52, consolidated into Firelands)
- LaGrange Wildcats (1924–59, consolidated into Keystone)
- North Ridgeville Rangers (1924–27, to Northern Ohio Athletic League (NOAL), 1933–61, to Lakeland)
- Penfield Bombers (1924–59, consolidated into Keystone)
- South Amherst Cavaliers^{1} (1924–61, to Inland)
- Wellington Dukes (1924–27, to NOAL)
- Lorain Clearview Clippers (1928–38, to NOAL, 1947–53, to Lakeland)
- Oberlin Firelands Falcons^{1} (1952–61, to Inland)
- Grafton Midview Middies (1955–61, to Lakeland)
- Lagrange Keystone Wildcats^{2} (1959–61)
1. Concurrent with Inland Conference 1957-61.
2. Concurrent with Inland Conference 1959-61.

Division Alignments

LCL Divisions 1924-38
Eastern	Western
Avon	Brighton
Avon Lake	Brownhelm
Belden	Camden
Brookside	Clearview (1928–38)
Columbia	Henrietta
Eaton	LaGrange (1933–38)
Grafton	Oberlin (1924–37)
LaGrange (1928–33)	Penfield
North Ridgeville (1924–27, 1933-)	South Amherst
	Wellington (1924–27)

LCL Divisions 1938-47
Northeast	Southeast	West
Avon	Belden	Brighton
Avon Lake	Columbia	Brownhelm
Brookside	Grafton	Camden
Eaton	LaGrange	Henrietta
North Ridgeville	Penfield	South Amherst

LCL Divisions 1947-55
Eastern	Western
Avon	Brighton (1947–52)
Avon Lake	Brownhelm (1947–52)
Belden	Brookside (1952–55)
Brookside (1947–52)	Camden (1947–52)
Columbia	Clearview (1948–53)
Eaton	Firelands (1952-)
Grafton	Henrietta (1947–52)
North Ridgeville	LaGrange
	Penfield
	South Amherst

=== Second Version (Lorain County Conference, 1986-2005) ===
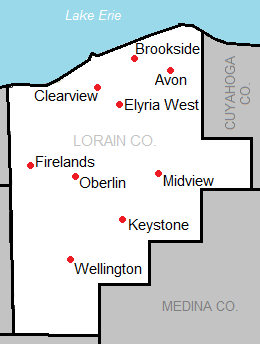
The league members from 1986-2005.

School	Nickname	Location	Colors	Tenure	Left for
Avon	Eagles	Avon	Purple, Gold	1986-2005	West Shore Conference
Brookside	Cardinals	Sheffield	Red, Black	1986-2005	Patriot Athletic Conference
Clearview	Clippers	Lorain	Blue, Gold	1986-2005	Patriot Athletic Conference
Elyria West	Wolverines	Elyria	Orange, Brown	1986-1996	Closed, absorbed by Elyria High School
Firelands	Falcons	Oberlin	Red, White, Black	1986-2005	Patriot Athletic Conference
Keystone	Wildcats	LaGrange	Purple, White	1986-2005	Patriot Athletic Conference
Midview	Middies	Grafton	Blue, Silver	1996-2005	West Shore Conference
Oberlin	Phoenix	Oberlin	Red, Blue	1986-2005	Patriot Athletic Conference
Wellington	Dukes	Wellington	Maroon, White	1986-2005	Patriot Athletic Conference

== See also ==
- Ohio high school athletic conferences
- Ohio High School Athletic Association
