= Clearview High School =

High school in Lorain, Ohio, United States

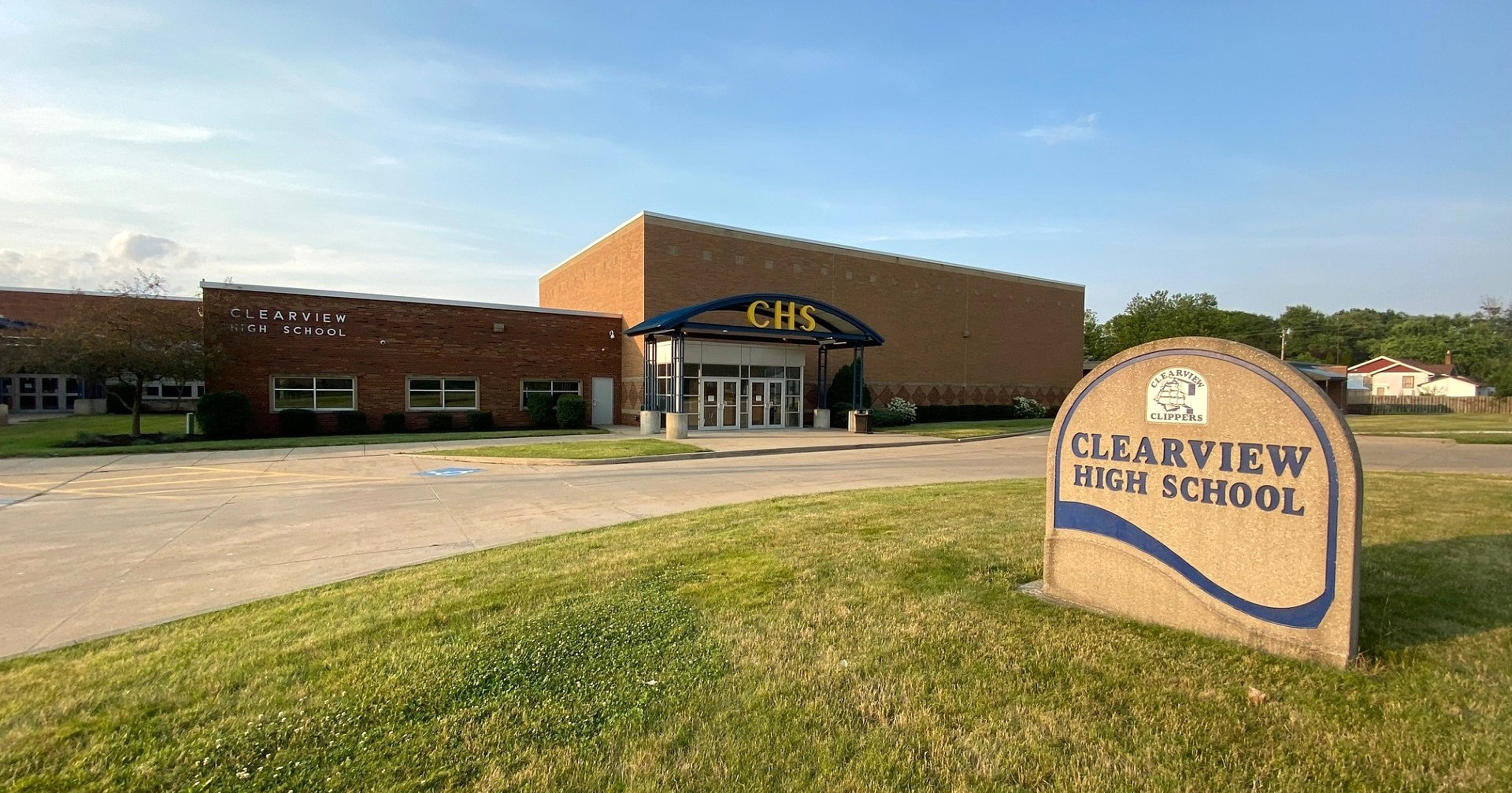

Location
- 4700 Broadway Avenue; Lorain, (Lorain County), Ohio 44052; United States
- 41°25′32″N 82°9′51″W

Information
- Type: Public, coeducational high school
- Opened: 1923
- School district: Clearview Local School District
- Superintendent: Jerome Davis
- Principal: Noeleen Rothacker
- Teaching staff: 25.50 (FTE)
- Grades: 9-12
- Student to teacher ratio: 13.33
- Colors: Blue and gold
- Athletics conference: Lorain County League
- Sports: Boys: football, cross country, basketball, wrestling, bowling, track, baseball Girls: volleyball, cross country, cheerleading, basketball, bowling, track, softball
- Mascot: Captain Clipper
- Team name: Clippers
- Rival: Columbia Raiders, Firelands Falcons, Brookside Cardinals, Black River Pirates, Wellington Dukes
- Yearbook: The Guide
- Athletic Director: Jacob Morehouse
- Website: https://www.clearviewschools.org/clearviewhighschool_home.aspx

Clearview High School (CHS) is a public high school located in Lorain, Ohio, United States. It is part of the Clearview Local School District, one of five school districts serving the city of Lorain and all of Sheffield Township, Ohio. Clearview High School houses students in grades 9-12. It was formerly named Clearview Junior-Senior High School and housed students in grades 7-12. After a remodeling project across the district in the early 2000s, grades 7 and 8 moved to Durling Middle School, just northwest of the high school.

Of the five school districts that are wholly or partially within the city of Lorain, Clearview serves the second largest population of Lorain students, with Lorain High School being the largest. The other local school districts are Amherst, Firelands, Vermilion and Elyria. At one time Lorain City Schools wanted the Clearview students that lived in the Lorain city part of the Clearview Local School District.

The school colors are blue and gold. The sports teams are known as the Clippers. The school's fight song, instrumentally, is the fight song from Washington State University.

== CHS History ==
Logo of the Clearview Clippers

Clearview High School was built in 1923, then named Highland, and including grades 4-8. The building consisted of six classrooms, two bathrooms, auditorium/gymnasium and an office. At this time, Clearview (Highland) was part of the Sheffield Lake School District. In 1927, six more classrooms were added.

The Clearview Local School District was formed by a petition of the Lorain County Board of Education on April 9, 1928.

In 1930 the name was changed to Clearview High School to reflect the new school district. That year, the auditorium/gymnasium was remodeled and could seat 555 people. The school doubled in size by adding home economics, manual training and mechanical drawing rooms. A year later, in 1931, the first graduating class of CHS with eleven graduates received their diplomas.

The football field (Tom Hoch Field) was built in 1937.

In 1940 shop classes and a garage were added.

In 1957 a new gymnasium, junior high wing with nine classrooms, cafeteria, music/band room and offices were added.

In 1961 the science wing was added and in 1968 a new library, arts and classrooms were added. On May 5, 1969 a major arson fire was set in the attic of the old 1923 section. The fire was contained to only the old section, thanks to the fire department and the fire doors which split the old section from the new sections. Damage was done to the auditorium, hallways, classrooms, and study hall, and the roof fell in.

The newest and last addition was completed in 2004 thanks to the Ohio School Facilities Commission; the school district received about $23 million. CHS received 10 million dollars to demolish, renovate and expand. The old sections built in 1923, 1927, 1930 and 1940 were demolished to make way for new classrooms. The rest of the school received a major renovation, and a new classroom wing was added behind the old junior high wing. Central air conditioning was added. A new auditorium, music and band rooms were built. The old study hall became the new weight room, and the old PPO office and hallway area formed a new practice room for the wrestling team. The school was made grades 9-12 only, and junior high was placed at the newly formed Durling Middle School.

In 2008 the Frank and Anne Szalay Gymnasium replaced the bleachers with new ones that spell out "Clearview" on the home side and Clippers on the visitors' side. This was accomplished by fundraising efforts.

== Academics ==
Students with high GPAs are eligible to attend Lorain County Community College through the Post-Secondary Enrollment Options Program (PSEO). Juniors and seniors also may attend the Lorain County Joint Vocational School in Oberlin. Students attending LCCC or LCJVS are officially Clearview students. Many students participating in one of these programs split their days between the high school site and LCCC/LCJVS.

Clearview High School traditionally sends a vast majority of its students to additional education, whether in college, vocational training or enlistment in the military after commencement. Seniors participate in the High School Recognition Assembly at Clearview High School before commencement exercises are held at the Lorain Palace Theater.

== Extracurricular activities ==
The Clearview Clippers competed in the Stripes Division of the Patriot Athletic Conference but, as of 2019, reformed the Lorain County League with seven other schools in baseball, basketball (boys' and girls'), bowling, cross country, football, softball, track and field, volleyball and wrestling. The Clearview football team plays home games at Tom Hoch Field at the high school complex, and the Clearview basketball, volleyball and wrestling teams play home games at the Frank and Anne Szalay Gymnasium.

Clearview was a former member of the Lakeland Conference and the Patriot Athletic Conference; both are now defunct.

Additionally, several teams compete at a club level, including Academic Challenge.

The Clearview Clippers finished the 2008 football regular season undefeated at 10-0. They lost their opening round state playoff game to Ottawa-Glandorf High School, 41-14.

Other CHS organizations include Blue Crew, cheerleading, National Honor Society, President's Club, Band, student council, yearbook and Youth for Youth.

== Ohio High School Athletic Association State Championships ==
- Boys' track and field - 1973, 1978, 1979, 2001
- Boys' basketball - 1974

== Notable alumni ==
- Charles J. Berry - Class of 1941; posthumously awarded the Medal of Honor after dying while serving in World War II; the Erie Avenue Bridge was named the Charles J. Berry bridge in his honor
- Anthony Hitchens - linebacker for the Kansas City Chiefs; drafted in the fourth round of the 2014 NFL Draft, 119 overall, out of the University of Iowa
- Jim Worden - former CFL All-Star at tight end for the Saskatchewan Roughriders

== Notable staff ==
- Doyt Perry - teacher and head football coach, 1933-1942; went on to coach at Bowling Green State University
