= Lorain County, Ohio =

County in Ohio, United States

- County
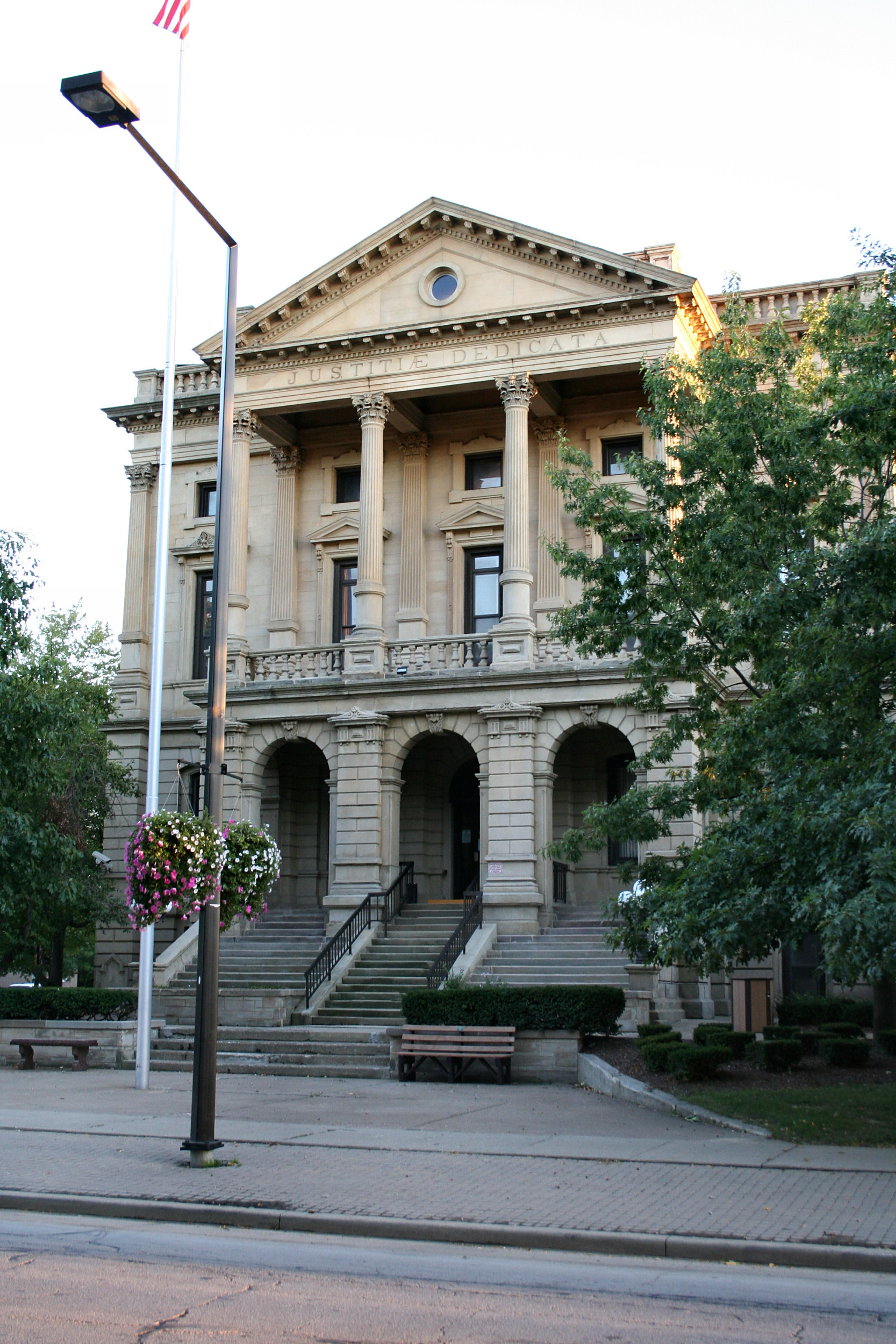
- Old county building in Elyria

- Flag Seal

- Location within the U.S. state of Ohio
- Coordinates: 41°28′N 82°09′W
- Country: United States
- State: Ohio
- Founded: April 1, 1824
- Named for: Lorraine in France
- Seat: Elyria
- Largest city: Lorain

Area
  - Total: 923 sq mi (2,390 km^{2})
  - Land: 491 sq mi (1,270 km^{2})
  - Water: 432 sq mi (1,120 km^{2}) 47%

Population (2020)
  - Total: 312,964
  - Estimate (2025): 323,219 ▲
  - Density: 637/sq mi (246/km^{2})
- Congressional district: 5th
- Website: www.loraincountyohio.gov

Lorain County (/lɔːˈreɪn/) is a county in the northeastern part of the U.S. state of Ohio As of the 2020 census, the population was 312,964. Its county seat is Elyria, and its largest city is Lorain. The county was physically established in 1822, becoming judicially independent in 1824. Lorain County is part of the Cleveland, OH Metropolitan Statistical Area. The county is home to Oberlin College.

== History ==
Lorain County was established in 1822 from portions of several of its adjacent counties. This county became judicially-independent in 1824. The original proposed name for the county was "Colerain," after Coleraine, Northern Ireland. The final name "Lorain" was chosen by Heman Ely, who had founded and named the city of Elyria. The county's name is based on the former German and now French province of Lorraine.

== Geography ==
According to the United States Census Bureau, the county has an area of 923 square miles (2,390 km^{2}), of which 491 square miles (1,270 km^{2}) is land and 432 square miles (1,120 km^{2}) (47%) is water. It is Ohio's fourth-largest county by area.

=== Adjacent counties ===
- Cuyahoga County (east)
- Medina County (southeast)
- Ashland County (south)
- Huron County (southwest)
- Erie County (west)

== Demographics ==
Historical population
Census	Pop.	Note	%±
1830	5,696		—
1840	18,467		224.2%
1850	26,086		41.3%
1860	29,744		14.0%
1870	30,308		1.9%
1880	35,526		17.2%
1890	40,295		13.4%
1900	54,857		36.1%
1910	76,037		38.6%
1920	90,612		19.2%
1930	109,206		20.5%
1940	112,390		2.9%
1950	148,162		31.8%
1960	217,500		46.8%
1970	256,843		18.1%
1980	274,909		7.0%
1990	271,126		−1.4%
2000	284,664		5.0%
2010	301,356		5.9%
2020	312,964		3.9%
2025 (est.)	323,219	▲	3.3%
U.S. Decennial Census; 1790–1960 1900–1990; 1990–2000 2010–2020

=== Racial and ethnic composition ===
Lorain County, Ohio – racial and ethnic composition Note: the US Census treats Hispanic/Latino as an ethnic category. This table excludes Latinos from the racial categories and assigns them to a separate category. Hispanics/Latinos may be of any race.
Race / ethnicity (NH = Non-Hispanic)	Pop 1980	Pop 1990	Pop 2000	Pop 2010	Pop 2020	% 1980	% 1990	% 2000	% 2010	% 2020
White alone (NH)	240,221	232,874	234,597	241,543	237,520	87.38%	85.89%	82.41%	80.15%	75.89%
Black or African American alone (NH)	19,549	20,696	23,365	24,289	22,980	7.11%	7.63%	8.21%	8.06%	7.34%
Native American or Alaska Native alone (NH)	451	680	699	635	502	0.16%	0.25%	0.25%	0.21%	0.16%
Asian alone (NH)	972	1,435	1,665	2,758	3,569	0.35%	0.53%	0.58%	0.92%	1.14%
Native Hawaiian or Pacific Islander alone (NH)	x	x	47	35	50	x	x	0.02%	0.01%	0.02%
Other race alone (NH)	592	180	267	302	1,020	0.22%	0.07%	0.09%	0.10%	0.33%
Mixed-race or multiracial (NH)	x	x	4,348	6,504	14,406	x	x	1.53%	2.16%	4.60%
Hispanic or Latino (any race)	13,124	15,261	19,676	25,290	32,917	4.77%	5.63%	6.91%	8.39%	10.52%
Total	274,909	271,126	284,664	301,356	312,964	100.00%	100.00%	100.00%	100.00%	100.00%

=== 2020 census ===
As of the 2020 census, the county had a population of 312,964. The median age was 42.6 years, with 21.6% of residents under the age of 18 and 19.5% aged 65 or older. For every 100 females there were 96.4 males, and for every 100 females age 18 and over there were 93.8 males age 18 and over.

The racial makeup of the county was 79.0% White, 7.9% Black or African American, 0.3% American Indian and Alaska Native, 1.2% Asian, <0.1% Native Hawaiian and Pacific Islander, 3.3% from some other race, and 8.3% from two or more races. Hispanic or Latino residents of any race comprised 10.5% of the population.

85.7% of residents lived in urban areas, while 14.3% lived in rural areas.

There were 125,239 households in the county, of which 28.4% had children under the age of 18 living in them. Of all households, 47.1% were married-couple households, 17.7% were households with a male householder and no spouse or partner present, and 28.0% were households with a female householder and no spouse or partner present. About 28.5% of all households were made up of individuals and 12.9% had someone living alone who was 65 years of age or older.

There were 134,341 housing units, of which 6.8% were vacant. Among occupied housing units, 71.4% were owner-occupied and 28.6% were renter-occupied. The homeowner vacancy rate was 1.4% and the rental vacancy rate was 8.7%.

=== 2010 census ===
As of the 2010 census, there were 301,356 people, 116,274 households, and 80,077 families residing in the county. The population density was 613.6 inhabitants per square mile (236.9/km^{2}). There were 127,036 housing units at an average density of 258.7 per square mile (99.9/km^{2}). The racial makeup of the county was 84.8% white, 8.6% black or African American, 0.9% Asian, 0.3% American Indian, 2.5% from other races, and 3.0% from two or more races. Those of Hispanic or Latino origin made up 8.4% of the population. In terms of ancestry, 26.5% were German, 16.7% were Irish, 10.9% were English, 8.4% were Polish, 8.2% were Italian, 6.2% were American, and 5.2% were Hungarian.

Of the 116,274 households, 32.6% had children under the age of 18 living with them, 50.5% were married couples living together, 13.5% had a female householder with no husband present, 31.1% were non-families, and 26.0% of all households were made up of individuals. The average household size was 2.51 and the average family size was 3.02. The median age was 40.0 years.

The median income for a household in the county was $52,066 and the median income for a family was $62,082. Males had a median income of $49,146 versus $35,334 for females. The per capita income for the county was $25,002. About 10.3% of families and 13.1% of the population were below the poverty line, including 20.5% of those under age 18 and 8.0% of those age 65 or over.

== Education ==
=== Higher education ===
- Lorain County Community College, Elyria
- Oberlin College, Oberlin

=== Public school districts ===
There are 20 public school districts in Lorain County. Those primarily in Lorain County are listed in bold. Each district's high school(s) and location is also listed.

- **Amherst Exempted Village School District**
  - Amherst Marion L. Steele High School, Amherst
- **Avon Local School District**
  - Avon High School, Avon
- **Avon Lake City School District**
  - Avon Lake High School, Avon Lake
- Black River Local School District (also in Medina Co and Ashland Co.)
  - Black River High School, Sullivan
- **Clearview Local School District**
  - Clearview High School, Lorain
- **Columbia Local School District**
  - Columbia High School, Columbia Station
- **Elyria City School District**
  - Elyria High School, Elyria
- **Firelands Local School District** (also in Erie Co.)
  - Firelands High School, Henrietta Twp (Oberlin)
- **Keystone Local School District**
  - Keystone High School, LaGrange
- **Lorain City School District**
  - Lorain High School, Lorain
- Mapleton Local School District (primarily in Ashland Co.)
  - Mapleton High School, Ashland
- **Midview Local School District**
  - Midview High School, Eaton Twp (Grafton)
- New London Local School District (primarily in Huron Co.)
  - New London High School, New London
- **North Ridgeville City School District**
  - North Ridgeville High School, North Ridgeville
- **Oberlin City School District**
  - Oberlin High School, Oberlin
- Olmsted Falls City School District (primarily in Cuyahoga Co.)
  - Olmsted Falls High School, Olmsted Falls
- **Sheffield-Sheffield Lake City Schools**
  - Brookside High School, Sheffield
- Strongsville City School District (primarily in Cuyahoga Co.)
  - Strongsville High School, Strongsville
- Vermilion Local Schools (primarily in Erie Co.)
  - Vermilion High School, Vermilion
- **Wellington Exempted Village School District** (also in Huron Co.)
  - Wellington High School, Wellington

The county also includes the Lorain County Joint Vocational School District, which encompasses the entire county and serves students from the Amherst, Avon, Avon Lake, Clearview, Columbia, Elyria, Firelands, Keystone, Midview, North Ridgeville, Oberlin, Sheffield-Sheffield Lake and Wellington school districts from a 10-acre campus on a 100-acre site near the intersection of State Route 58 and U.S. Route 20 in Oberlin.

=== Private high schools ===
- Elyria Catholic High School, Elyria
- Lake Ridge Academy, North Ridgeville
- Open Door Christian School, Elyria
- Christian Community School, North Eaton
- First Baptist Christian School, Elyria

== Government ==
As of 2025, the following county-wide elected officials are in office:

Lorain County elected officials
Position	Name	Party
Commissioner	David J. Moore	Republican
Commissioner	Marty Gallagher	Republican
Commissioner	Jeff Riddell	Republican
Prosecuting attorney	Anthony Cillo	Republican
Sheriff	Jack M. Hall	Republican
Clerk of courts	Tom Orlando	Democrat
Coroner	Dr. Frank P. Miller III	Republican
Auditor	J. Craig Snodgrass	Democrat
Recorder	Mike Doran	Republican
Treasurer	Daniel J. Talarek	Democrat
Engineer	Kenneth Carney	Democrat

Lorain County judges
Position	Name	Party
Common Pleas - General	Giovanna V. Bremke	Republican
Common Pleas - General	Christopher R. Rothgery	Democrat
Common Pleas - General	D. Christopher Cook	Democrat
Common Pleas - General	Raymond J. Ewers	Democrat
Common Pleas - General	Melissa C. Kobasher	Democrat
Common Pleas - General	Donna C. Freeman	Democrat
Domestic Relations Division	Frank J. Janik	Democrat
Domestic Relations Division	Sherry Glass Strohsack	Democrat
Domestic Relations Division	Lisa I. Swenski	Democrat
Probate Division	James T. Walther	Democrat

== Politics ==
Lorain County used to lean Democratic in more recent presidential elections, voting for the Democratic candidate for president from 1988 to 2012. In 2016, however, the county was almost swept up as part of the unexpected Republican surge in the Rust Belt; Donald Trump came within 131 votes of winning the county. In 2020, Trump flipped the county Republican by a narrow majority, becoming the first Republican to capture the county since Ronald Reagan in 1984. In 2024, Trump won the county with 52.12% of the vote, the highest percentage for a Republican since 1972. Despite this, the county also voted for Democrat Sherrod Brown in the 2024 Senate election, making it the only county in the state to vote for both Trump and Brown in 2024.

United States presidential election results for Lorain County, Ohio
Year	Republican		Democratic		Third party(ies)	
Year	No.	%	No.	%	No.	%
1856	3,604	70.97%	1,420	27.96%	54	1.06%
1860	4,045	66.89%	1,766	29.20%	236	3.90%
1864	4,600	73.65%	1,646	26.35%	0	0.00%
1868	4,443	69.72%	1,930	30.28%	0	0.00%
1872	4,432	67.71%	2,097	32.03%	17	0.26%
1876	5,187	65.28%	2,720	34.23%	39	0.49%
1880	5,609	66.25%	2,752	32.51%	105	1.24%
1884	5,478	60.30%	3,199	35.21%	408	4.49%
1888	5,235	57.32%	3,311	36.25%	587	6.43%
1892	5,434	56.60%	3,674	38.27%	492	5.13%
1896	7,801	63.28%	4,367	35.43%	159	1.29%
1900	8,497	61.93%	4,989	36.36%	235	1.71%
1904	9,001	70.16%	2,700	21.04%	1,129	8.80%
1908	8,699	57.10%	5,460	35.84%	1,076	7.06%
1912	2,226	16.34%	4,591	33.71%	6,804	49.95%
1916	6,868	45.66%	7,658	50.91%	516	3.43%
1920	18,125	65.84%	8,640	31.39%	764	2.78%
1924	17,062	61.43%	3,965	14.28%	6,747	24.29%
1928	24,386	63.83%	13,607	35.62%	212	0.55%
1932	20,897	51.00%	18,753	45.77%	1,321	3.22%
1936	15,906	37.29%	24,393	57.19%	2,357	5.53%
1940	23,422	47.55%	25,831	52.45%	0	0.00%
1944	23,866	48.59%	25,254	51.41%	0	0.00%
1948	21,616	49.53%	21,397	49.03%	625	1.43%
1952	33,825	56.36%	26,194	43.64%	0	0.00%
1956	40,340	60.11%	26,774	39.89%	0	0.00%
1960	39,361	47.51%	43,487	52.49%	0	0.00%
1964	26,683	32.37%	55,755	67.63%	0	0.00%
1968	34,252	39.95%	42,642	49.74%	8,833	10.30%
1972	51,102	56.15%	36,634	40.25%	3,280	3.60%
1976	39,459	41.66%	52,387	55.31%	2,865	3.02%
1980	51,034	49.51%	40,919	39.69%	11,131	10.80%
1984	57,379	50.77%	52,970	46.87%	2,672	2.36%
1988	50,410	47.14%	55,600	52.00%	916	0.86%
1992	36,803	31.03%	50,962	42.97%	30,840	26.00%
1996	34,937	32.82%	55,744	52.37%	15,764	14.81%
2000	47,957	42.75%	59,809	53.32%	4,414	3.93%
2004	61,203	43.49%	78,970	56.11%	569	0.40%
2008	59,068	40.22%	85,276	58.07%	2,515	1.71%
2012	59,405	41.47%	81,464	56.87%	2,384	1.66%
2016	66,818	47.54%	66,949	47.63%	6,795	4.83%
2020	79,520	50.40%	75,667	47.96%	2,581	1.64%
2024	83,297	52.12%	74,207	46.44%	2,303	1.44%

United States Senate election results for Lorain County, Ohio1
Year	Republican		Democratic		Third party(ies)	
Year	No.	%	No.	%	No.	%
2024	71,759	45.95%	79,307	50.78%	5,115	3.28%

== Infrastructure ==
=== Airports ===
The Lorain County Regional Airport is located six nautical miles (6.9 mi; 11 km) south of Lorain's central business district.

=== Major highways ===
- Interstate 80 (Ohio Turnpike)
- Interstate 90 (Ohio Turnpike)
- Interstate 480
- U.S. Route 6
- U.S. Route 20
- State Route 2
- State Route 10
- State Route 18
- State Route 57
- State Route 58
- Ohio Route 82
- Ohio Route 83
- State Route 113
- Ohio Route 162
- Ohio Route 252
- Ohio Route 254
- Ohio Route 301
- Ohio Route 303
- Ohio Route 511
- Ohio Route 611

== Communities ==
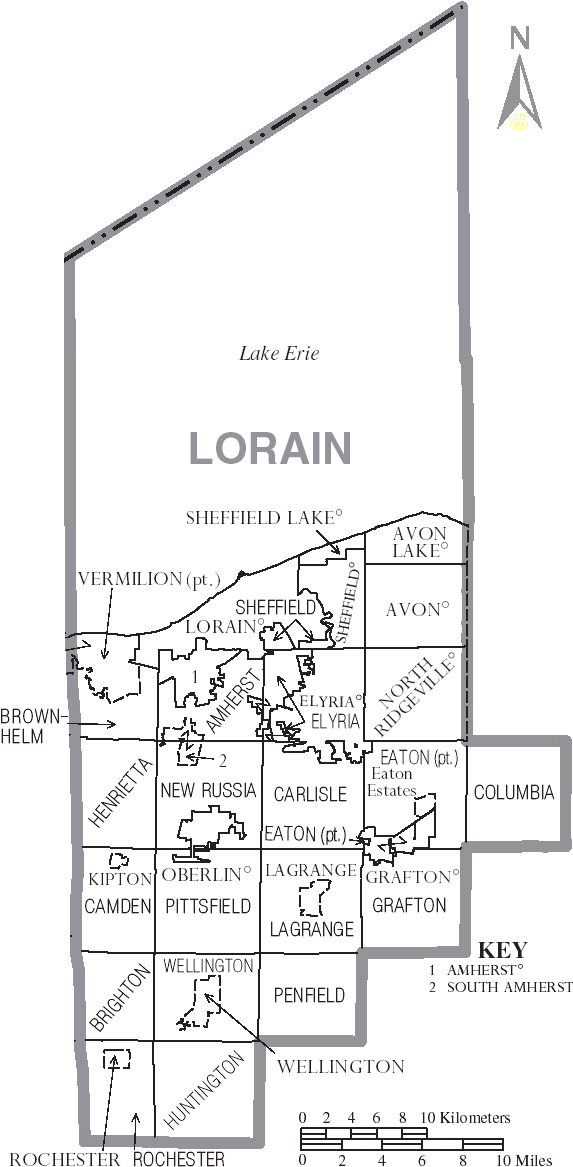
Map of Lorain County, with municipal and township labels

=== Cities ===
- Amherst
- Avon
- Avon Lake
- Elyria (county seat)
- Lorain
- North Ridgeville
- Oberlin
- Sheffield Lake
- Vermilion

=== Villages ===
- Grafton
- Kipton
- LaGrange
- Rochester
- Sheffield
- South Amherst
- Wellington

=== Townships ===
- Amherst
- Brighton
- Brownhelm
- Camden
- Carlisle
- Columbia
- Eaton
- Elyria
- Grafton
- Henrietta
- Huntington
- LaGrange
- New Russia
- Penfield
- Pittsfield
- Rochester
- Sheffield
- Wellington

=== Census-designated places ===
- Eaton Estates
- Pheasant Run

=== Unincorporated communities ===
- Belden
- Brentwood Lake
- Brighton
- Columbia Hills Corners
- Columbia Station
- Henrietta
- North Eaton
- Pittsfield
- Whiskyville

== See also ==
- National Register of Historic Places listings in Lorain County, Ohio
- USS Lorain County (LST-1177)
