= Black River Local School District =

School district in Ohio

Address
- 257a County Road 40 Sullivan, Ohio, 44880; United States

District information
- Grades: Pre-school - 12
- Superintendent: Anthony Stretar
- NCES District ID: 3904846

Students and staff
- Enrollment: 1,724
- Student–teacher ratio: 14.58

Other information
- Telephone: (419) 736-3300
- Fax: (419) 736-3308
- Website: www.blackriverschools.org

The Black River Local School District is a public school district that covers north eastern Ashland County, south eastern Lorain County and south western Medina County, Ohio, United States, based in Sullivan, Ohio.

== Schools ==
The Black River Local School District has one elementary school, one middle school, and one high school. There are two facilities that students are housed in, the Black River Education Center (BREC) houses the elementary and middle school students and then the high school is in another building.

=== Elementary school ===
- Black River Elementary School

=== Middle school ===
- Black River Middle School

=== High school ===
- Black River High School
