= Whiskyville, Ohio =

Unincorporated community in Ohio, U.S.

Coordinates: 41°22′00″N 82°12′38″W

Whiskyville is an unincorporated community in Lorain County, Ohio, United States.

== History ==
Whiskyville was so named in the 19th century on account of there being many distilleries located in the town. The community was named Whiskyville after a still was built there in 1838 by Elias Mann. Whiskyville is located at the crossing of state route 113 and state route 58.
