= Doyt Perry =

American football coach, athletics administrator (1910–1992)

Biographical details
- Born: January 6, 1910; Croton, Ohio, U.S.
- Died: February 10, 1992 (aged 82); Bowling Green, Ohio, U.S.

Playing career

Football
- 1929–1931: Bowling Green

Basketball
- 1929–1932: Bowling Green

Baseball
- ?–1932: Bowling Green
- Positions: Quarterback (football); Forward (basketball)

Coaching career (HC unless noted)

Football
- 1933–1942: Clearview HS (OH)
- 1943: Upper Arlington HS (OH)
- 1946–1950: Upper Arlington HS (OH)
- 1951–1954: Ohio State (backfield)
- 1955–1964: Bowling Green

Basketball
- 1933–1943: Clearview HS (OH)

Track and field
- 1933–1943: Clearview HS (OH)

Golf
- 1973: FIU

Administrative career (AD unless noted)
- 1965–1971: Bowling Green
- 1971–1973: FIU

Head coaching record
- Overall: 77–11–5 (college football); 73–20–5 (high school football); 161–35 (high school basketball)
- Bowls: 0–1

Accomplishments and honors

Championships
- Football; 5 MAC (1956, 1959, 1961–1962, 1964)
- College Football Hall of Fame; Inducted in 1988 (profile)

Doyt L. Perry (January 6, 1910 – February 10, 1992) was an American football coach and college athletics administrator. He served as head football coach at Bowling Green State University from 1955 to 1964, compiling a record of 77–11–5, and then became the athletic director for the university. During his tenure as coach, Perry led the Bowling Green Falcons to five Mid-American Conference titles and one small college national championship, in 1959. One of the most successful coaches in school history, Perry was elected to College Football Hall of Fame in 1988. The team's football stadium, Doyt Perry Stadium, is named in his honor.

A native of Columbus, Ohio, Perry lettered in three sports—football, basketball, and baseball—at Bowling Green before graduating in 1932. He coached football, basketball, and track and field at Clearview High School in Lorain, Ohio from 1933 to 1943. His football teams at Clearview had a record of 32–9–4, and his basketball teams were 161–35. Perry moved on to Upper Arlington High School in Upper Arlington, Ohio in 1943, where he was head football coach in 1943 and from 1946 to 1950, leading his team to a record of 41–11–1. Before returning to Bowling Green, Perry was a backfield coach at Ohio State University from 1951 to 1954, serving on the same staff as Woody Hayes and Bo Schembechler. He coached the 1954 Buckeyes, who won the 1955 Rose Bowl and a national championship. Perry resigned from Bowling Green in January 1971 to serve as an athletic advisor at Florida International University (FIU) for two years until retirement.

Perry died on February 10, 1992, at Bowling Green Manor in Bowling Green, Ohio.

== Head coaching record ==
=== College football ===
| Year | Team | Overall | Conference | Standing | Bowl/playoffs |
|---|---|---|---|---|---|
Bowling Green Falcons (Mid-American Conference) (1955–1964)
| 1955 | Bowling Green | 7–1–1 | 4–1–1 | 2nd | |
| 1956 | Bowling Green | 8–0–1 | 5–0–1 | 1st | |
| 1957 | Bowling Green | 6–1–2 | 3–1–2 | 2nd | |
| 1958 | Bowling Green | 7–2 | 4–2 | 3rd | |
| 1959 | Bowling Green | 9–0 | 6–0 | 1st | |
| 1960 | Bowling Green | 8–1 | 5–1 | 2nd | |
| 1961 | Bowling Green | 8–2 | 5–1 | 1st | L Mercy |
| 1962 | Bowling Green | 7–1–1 | 5–0–1 | 1st | |
| 1963 | Bowling Green | 8–2 | 4–2 | 3rd | |
| 1964 | Bowling Green | 9–1 | 5–1 | 1st | |
| Bowling Green: | | 77–11–5 | 46–8–5 | | |
| Total: | | 77–11–5 | | | |
National championship Conference title Conference division title or championship game berth
