= Sheffield-Sheffield Lake City Schools =

School district in Ohio, United States

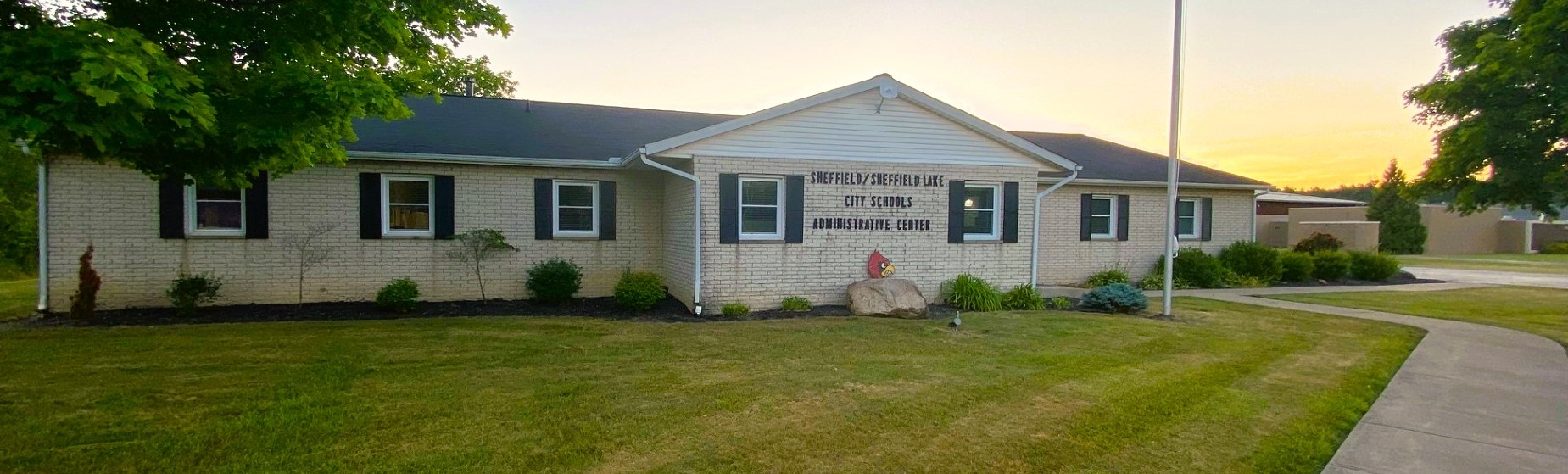
- Sheffield-Sheffield Lake City Schools administration center

Address
- 1824 Harris Road Sheffield Village, Ohio, 44054; United States

District information
- Type: Public
- Grades: PK–12
- Schools: 5
- NCES District ID: 3904476

Students and staff
- Students: 1,455 (2024–2025)
- Teachers: 90.71 (on an FTE basis) (2024–2025)
- Staff: 264.32 (on an FTE basis) (2024–2025)
- Student–teacher ratio: 16.04 (2024–2025)

Other information
- Website: www.sheffieldschools.org

Sheffield-Sheffield Lake City Schools is a school district, whose board office is located in Sheffield, Ohio, 20 miles west of Cleveland, Ohio. It is a public school located in northeastern Ohio.

== Schools ==
- Forestlawn Early Learning Center (Pre-K & K)
- Knollwood Elementary School (K-2)
- Brookside Intermediate School(3-6)
- Brookside Middle School (7-8)
- Brookside High School (9-12)
