= Columbia Hills Corners, Ohio =

Unincorporated community in Ohio, U.S.

Coordinates: 41°18′46″N 81°54′56″W

Columbia Hills Corners is an unincorporated community in Lorain County, in the U.S. state of Ohio.

== History ==
An early variant name was Copopa. A post office called Copopa was established in 1824, and remained in operation until 1904. The euphonic name of Columbia Hills Corners was coined by a property developer in order to generate interest in his new country club near the town site.
