= Open Door Christian School (Elyria, Ohio) =

Open Door Christian Schools

Location
- 8287 West Ridge Road; Elyria, (Lorain County), Ohio 44035; United States; 41°22′24″N 82°9′38″W

Information
- Type: Private Christian
- Religious affiliation: Non-denominational Christianity
- Opened: 1976
- School district: Elyria
- Principal: Jayson Bendik (Upper school ) Angie Lowe (Elementary school)
- Grades: PK–12
- Campus size: 30 acres (120,000 m^{2})
- Colors: Royal Blue and White
- Team name: Patriots
- Newspaper: ODCS Press
- Website: https://www.odcs.org/

Open Door Christian School is a private, coeducational, K-12 Christian school in Elyria, Ohio. It is a non-profit, non-denominational ministry of Church of the Open Door. Athletic teams are known as the Patriots, and they compete in the Ohio High School Athletic Association.

== History ==
Open Door Christian Schools was established in 1976 in Elyria as a ministry of the Church of the Open Door. The school was founded to provide a private Christian education for students in the surrounding Lorain County area, integrating religious instruction with a traditional academic curriculum.

== Athletics ==
Open Door Christian Schools currently offers:

- Baseball
- Basketball
- Bowling
- Cross country
- Golf
- Soccer
- Softball
- Track and field
- Volleyball
