= Wellington High School (Wellington, Ohio) =

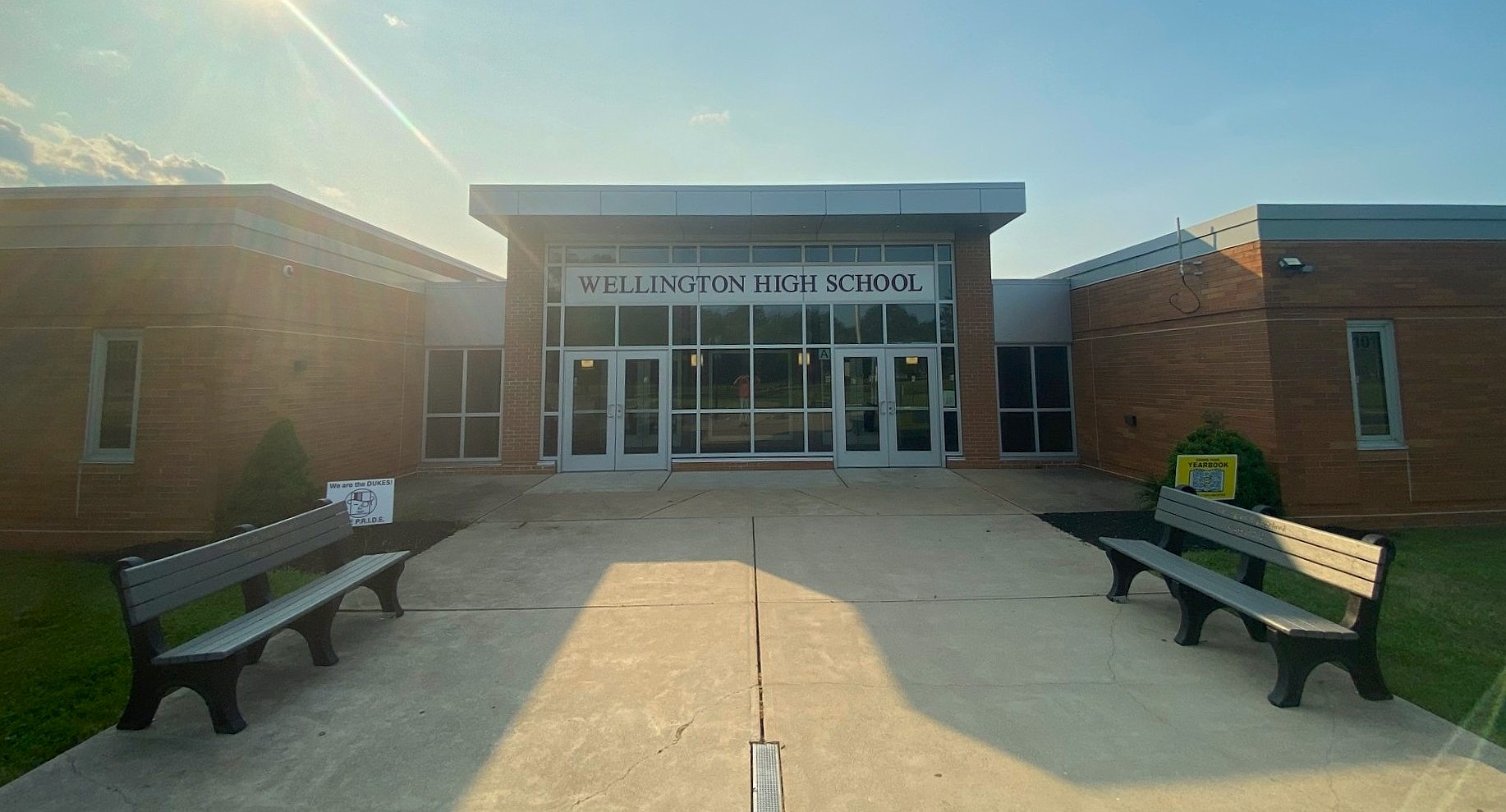

Location
- 629 North Main Street; Wellington, (Lorain County), Ohio 44090; United States; 41°10′39″N 82°13′12″W

Information
- Type: Public, Coeducational high school
- Opened: 1971
- Superintendent: Andy Peltz
- Principal: Shyla Urban
- Staff: 17
- Faculty: 25
- Grades: 9-12
- Colors: Maroon and White
- Fight song: Wellington Fight Song
- Athletics conference: Lorain County League
- Mascot: The Duke
- Team name: Dukes
- Rival: Keystone Wildcats
- Band Director: Devlin Pope
- Athletic Director: John Bowman
- Website: www.wellington.k12.oh.us

Wellington High School is a public high school located in Wellington, Ohio in Lorain County, Ohio.

The school colors are maroon and white, and the mascot and nickname for the sports teams is the Wellington Dukes. Wellington has many sports including football, volleyball, basketball, soccer, wrestling, track and field, baseball, softball, and the state renowned marching band. The school is a member of the Lorain County League (LCL) which includes other area schools such as Oberlin High School, Keystone High School, Brookside High School, Clearview High School, among others.

Wellington offers a wide variety of different academic options. It also has many clubs and organizations. The drama club produces excellent and well-known productions, with the most recent being The Outsiders.

For leadership opportunities, the school has a Student Council and is a part of NHS.
