= LaGrange, Ohio =

- Village
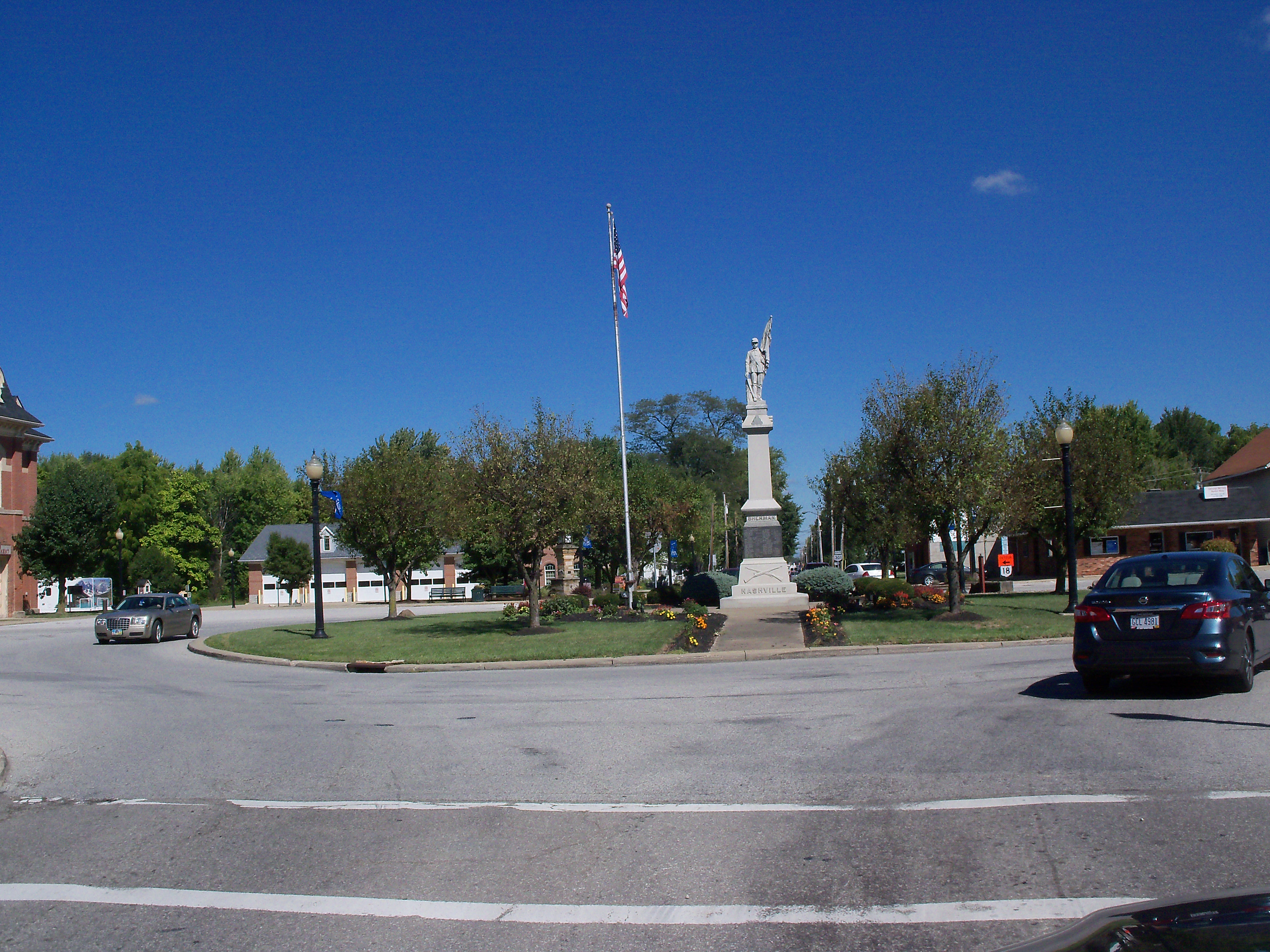
- Roundabout intersection in LaGrange

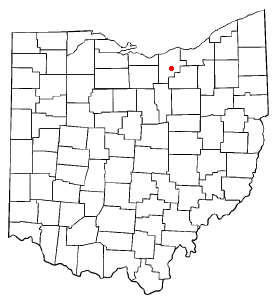
- Location of LaGrange, Ohio

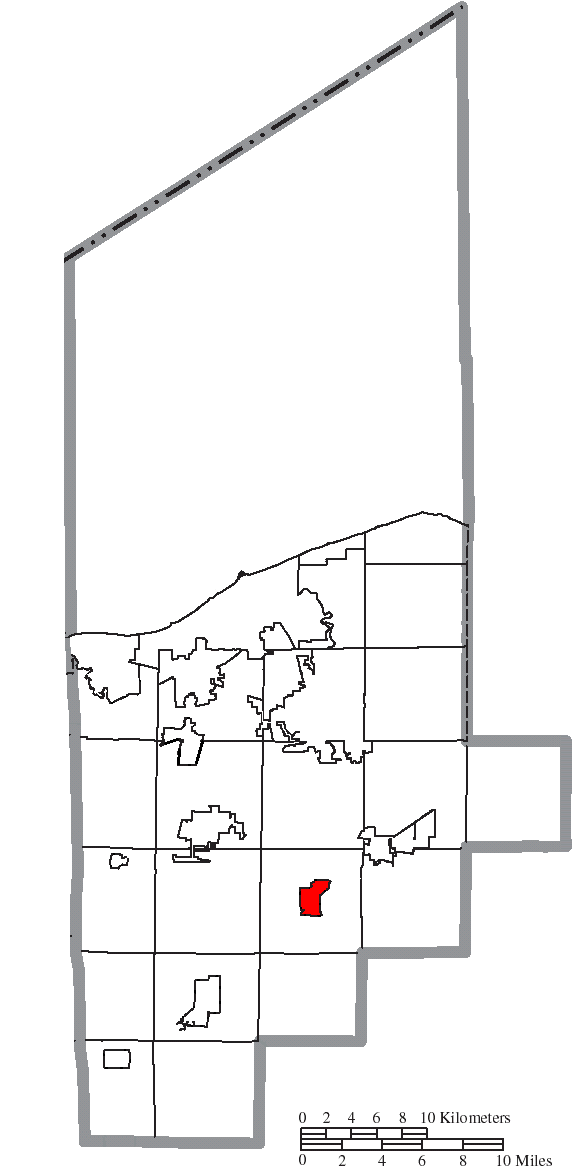
- Location of LaGrange in Lorain County
- Coordinates: 41°14′50″N 82°07′12″W
- Country: United States
- State: Ohio
- County: Lorain
- Township: LaGrange

Government
  - Type: Village council

Area
  - Total: 1.90 sq mi (4.93 km^{2})
  - Land: 1.90 sq mi (4.92 km^{2})
  - Water: 0.0039 sq mi (0.01 km^{2})
- Elevation: 817 ft (249 m)

Population (2020)
  - Total: 2,595
  - Density: 1,365.1/sq mi (527.07/km^{2})
- Time zone: UTC-5 (Eastern (EST))
  - Summer (DST): UTC-4 (EDT)
- ZIP code: 44050
- Area code: 440
- FIPS code: 39-41230
- GNIS feature ID: 2398374
- Website: www.villageoflagrangeohio.gov

LaGrange (/ləˈɡreɪndʒ/ lə-GRAYNJ) is a village in Lorain County, Ohio, United States. The population was 2,595 at the 2020 census.

The village derives its name from Château de la Grange-Bléneau, the French home of Gilbert du Motier, Marquis de Lafayette, an officer in the American Revolutionary War.

== Geography ==
According to the United States Census Bureau, the village has a total area of 2.01 square miles (5.21 km^{2}), all land.

== Demographics ==
Historical population
Census	Pop.	Note	%±
1880	511		—
1890	551		7.8%
1900	528		−4.2%
1910	467		−11.6%
1920	500		7.1%
1930	498		−0.4%
1940	546		9.6%
1950	712		30.4%
1960	1,007		41.4%
1970	1,074		6.7%
1980	1,258		17.1%
1990	1,199		−4.7%
2000	1,815		51.4%
2010	2,103		15.9%
2020	2,595		23.4%
U.S. Decennial Census

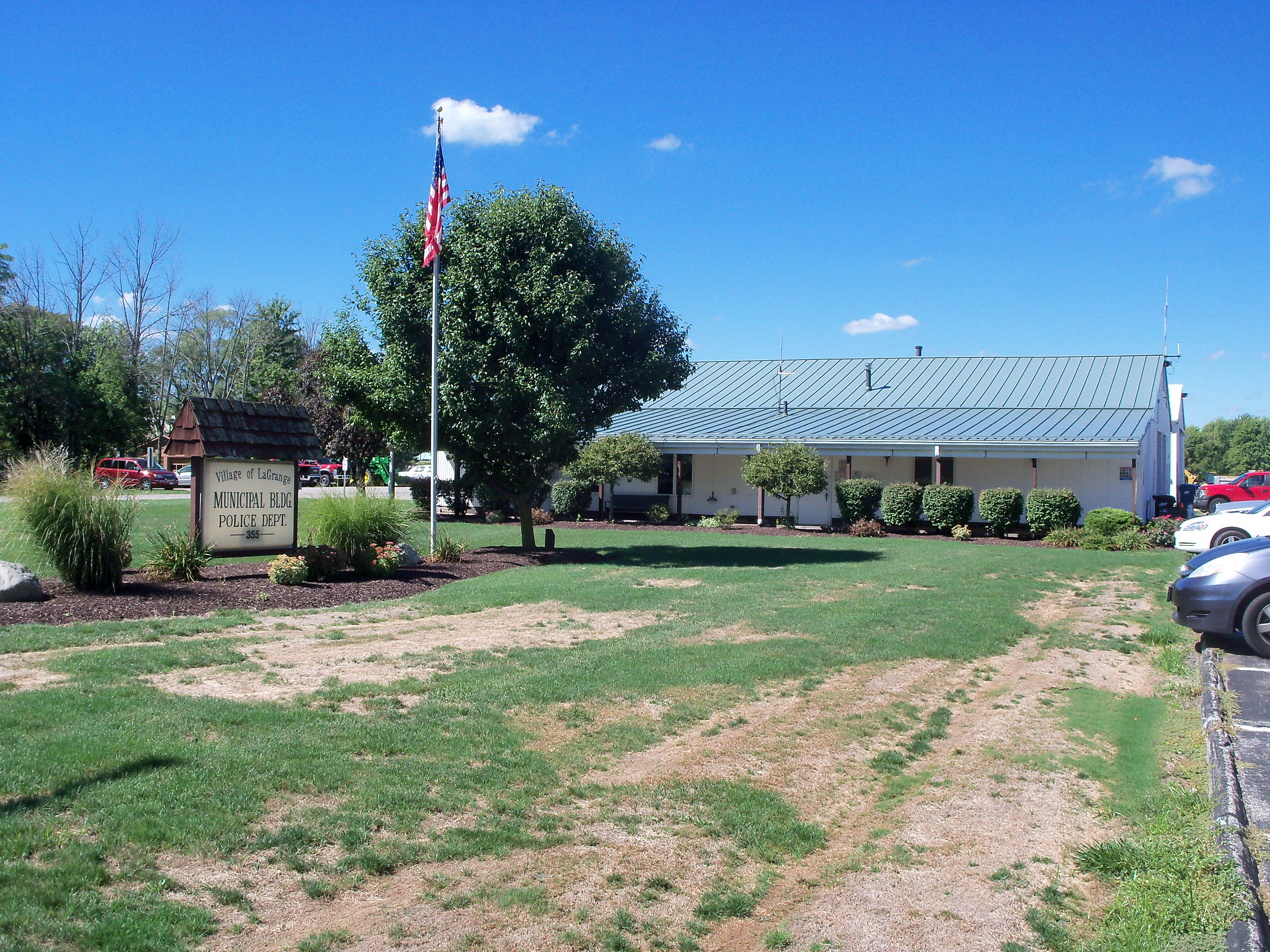
LaGrange Municipal Building

=== 2010 census ===
As of the census of 2010, there were 2,103 people, 726 households, and 569 families living in the village. The population density was 1,046.3 inhabitants per square mile (404.0/km^{2}). There were 789 housing units at an average density of 392.5 per square mile (151.5/km^{2}). The racial makeup of the village was 96.6% White, 0.4% African American, 0.7% Native American, 0.2% Asian, 0.4% from other races, and 1.7% from two or more races. Hispanic or Latino of any race were 1.9% of the population.

There were 726 households, of which 40.6% had children under the age of 18 living with them, 60.9% were married couples living together, 12.5% had a female householder with no husband present, 5.0% had a male householder with no wife present, and 21.6% were non-families. 17.1% of all households were made up of individuals, and 5.3% had someone living alone who was 65 years of age or older. The average household size was 2.73 and the average family size was 3.07.

The median age in the village was 41.4 years. 25.7% of residents were under the age of 18; 7% were between the ages of 18 and 24; 23.5% were from 25 to 44; 29.4% were from 45 to 64; and 14.4% were 65 years of age or older. The gender makeup of the village was 48.5% male and 51.5% female.

=== 2000 census ===
As of the census of 2000, there were 1,815 people, 618 households, and 501 families living in the village. The population density was 1,031.9 inhabitants per square mile (398.4/km^{2}). There were 648 housing units at an average density of 368.4 per square mile (142.2/km^{2}). The racial makeup of the village was 97.19% White, 0.72% African American, 0.28% Native American, 0.17% Asian, 0.33% from other races, and 1.32% from two or more races. Hispanic or Latino of any race were 1.21% of the population.

There were 618 households, out of which 45.6% had children under the age of 18 living with them, 68.8% were married couples living together, 8.9% had a female householder with no husband present, and 18.9% were non-families. 14.6% of all households were made up of individuals, and 5.0% had someone living alone who was 65 years of age or older. The average household size was 2.94 and the average family size was 3.25.

In the village, the population was spread out, with 32.1% under the age of 18, 7.3% from 18 to 24, 33.3% from 25 to 44, 20.4% from 45 to 64, and 6.9% who were 65 years of age or older. The median age was 33 years. For every 100 females there were 94.7 males. For every 100 females age 18 and over, there were 92.2 males.

The median income for a household in the village was $50,750, and the median income for a family was $55,179. Males had a median income of $41,591 versus $26,302 for females. The per capita income for the village was $19,465. About 3.6% of families and 6.2% of the population were below the poverty line, including 5.4% of those under age 18 and 11.5% of those age 65 or over.

== Statue ==
Sherman's Circle, downtown LaGrange, is owned and maintained by LaGrange Township Trustees, and includes a tribute statue to the Union soldiers of the Civil War. On June 28, 2022, the statue of General Sherman, that stood for nearly 120 years in the town square, was struck by a truck and taken down at around 2:30 a.m. The statue was replaced in 2025.

== In popular culture ==
- Some scenes from the 2011 film Take Shelter, were filmed in LaGrange.

== Notable people ==
- Dorothy Maguire - professional baseball player
- Robert E. McKisson - Republican politician and former mayor of Cleveland, Ohio
