= Keystone High School (LaGrange, Ohio) =

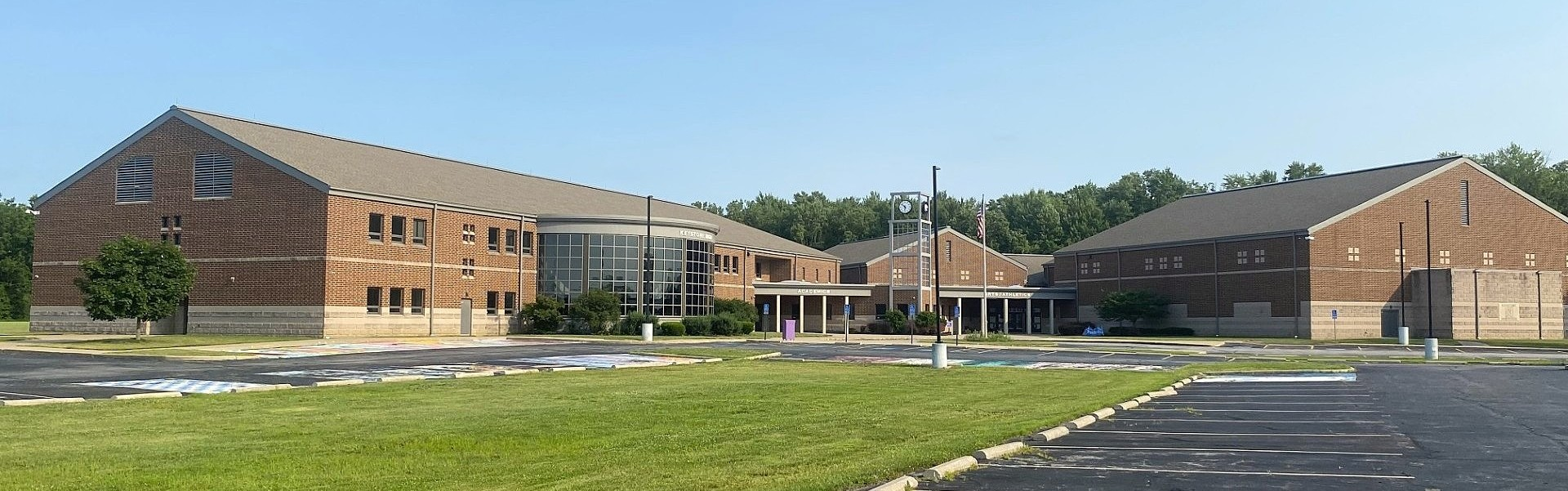

Location
- 580 Opportunity Way; LaGrange, (Lorain County), Ohio 44050; United States
- 41°13′52″N 82°6′22″W

Information
- Type: Public, Coeducational high school
- Superintendent: Zachary Weagley
- Principal: Derrick (DJ) Shaw
- Grades: 9-12
- Colors: Purple and White
- Athletics conference: Lorain County League
- Mascot: Wildcats
- Rival: Wellington High School
- Athletic Director: Jeff Holzhauer
- Website: keystonelocalschools.org

Keystone High School is a public high school located in LaGrange, Ohio, southwest of Cleveland in Lorain County, Ohio. A new high school was built and opened in August, 2006.

The school's primary color is purple, with secondary colors of white and gray. The school's mascot is the Wildcat. The school is a member of the Lorain County League. The tune of the alma mater is Far Above Cayuga's Waters; the fight song, On Wisconsin.

== Ohio High School Athletic Association State Championships ==
- Girls Softball - 1999, 2006, 2012, 2018, 2021

== Link ==
keystonelocalschools.org|District Website
