= Columbia Township, Lorain County, Ohio =

Township in Ohio, US

- Township
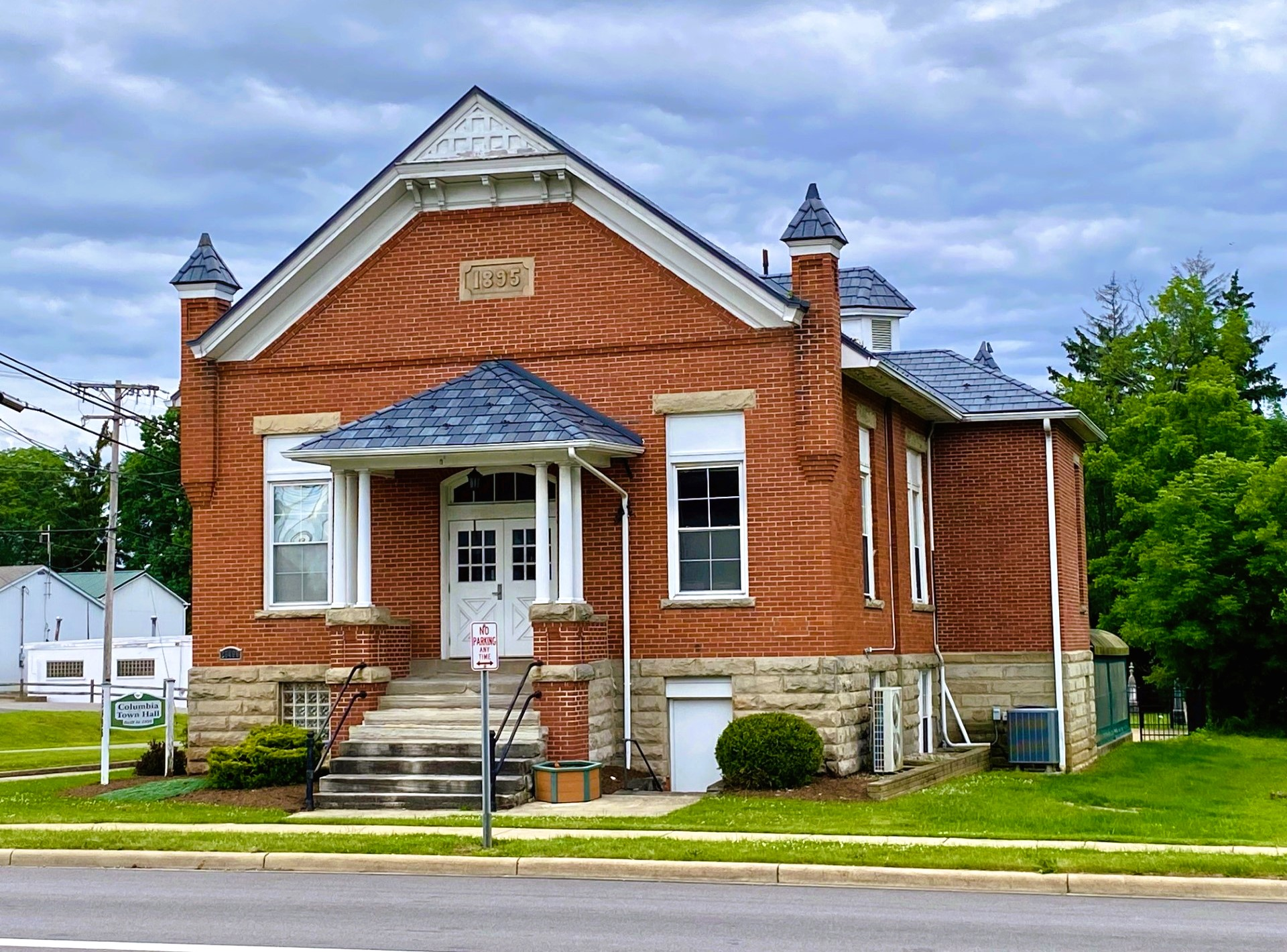
- Columbia Township Town Hall

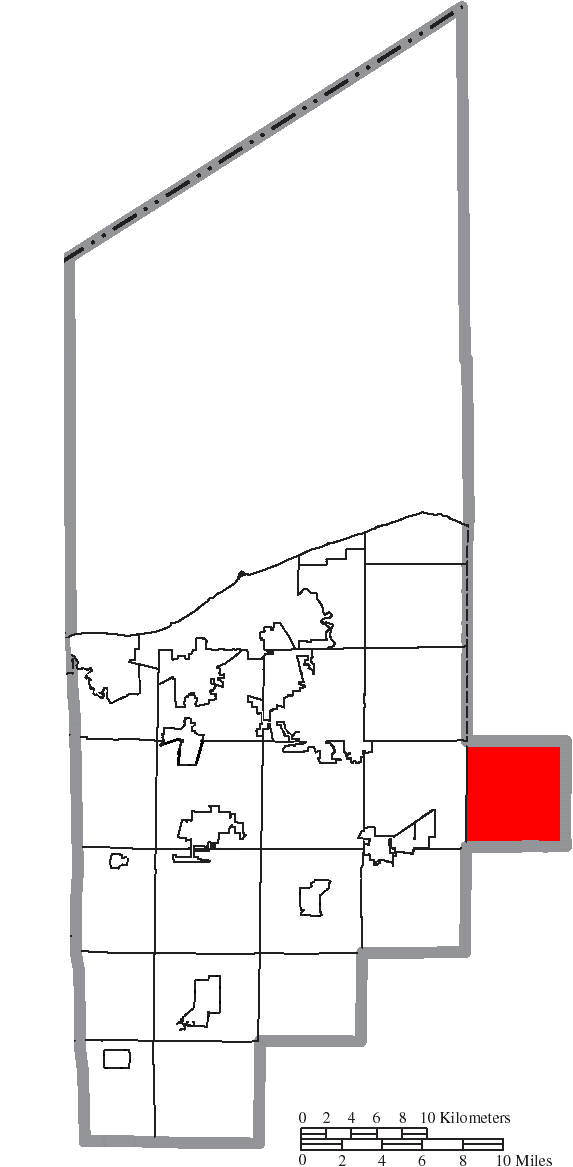
- Location of Columbia Township in Lorain County

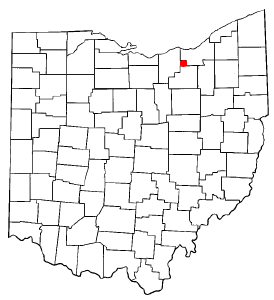
- Location of Columbia Township in Ohio
- Coordinates: 41°19′16″N 81°55′6″W
- Country: United States
- State: Ohio
- County: Lorain

Area
  - Total: 25.72 sq mi (66.62 km^{2})
  - Land: 25.50 sq mi (66.05 km^{2})
  - Water: 0.22 sq mi (0.56 km^{2})
- Elevation: 768 ft (234 m)

Population (2020)
  - Total: 7,411
  - Density: 290.6/sq mi (112.2/km^{2})
- Time zone: UTC-5 (Eastern (EST))
  - Summer (DST): UTC-4 (EDT)
- ZIP code: 44028
- Area code: 440
- FIPS code: 39-16910
- GNIS feature ID: 1086506
- Website: columbiatwp.us

Columbia Township, also known as Columbia Station or just Columbia, is the easternmost of the eighteen townships of Lorain County, Ohio, United States. Columbia Township is the official government name, while Columbia Station is the post office name, and tends to be the town name used by residents. The post office name was chosen to differentiate the township from other Columbia Townships statewide, located in Hamilton and Meigs counties.

As of the 2020 census, the township had a population of 7,411.

== Geography ==
According to the United States Census Bureau, the township has a total area of 66.6 square kilometres (25.7 sq mi), of which 0.2 square miles (0.6 km^{2}), or 0.85%, are water. The west branch of the Rocky River and Plum Creek flow through the township from south to north.

Columbia Township is part of Greater Cleveland.

Located in eastern Lorain County, it borders the following townships and cities:

- Olmsted Township, Cuyahoga County - north
- Olmsted Falls - north
- Berea, Cuyahoga County - northeast corner
- Strongsville, Cuyahoga County - east
- Brunswick Hills Township, Medina County - southeast corner
- Liverpool Township, Medina County - south
- Grafton Township - southwest corner
- Eaton Township - west
- North Ridgeville - northwest corner

No municipalities are located in Columbia Township.

== History ==
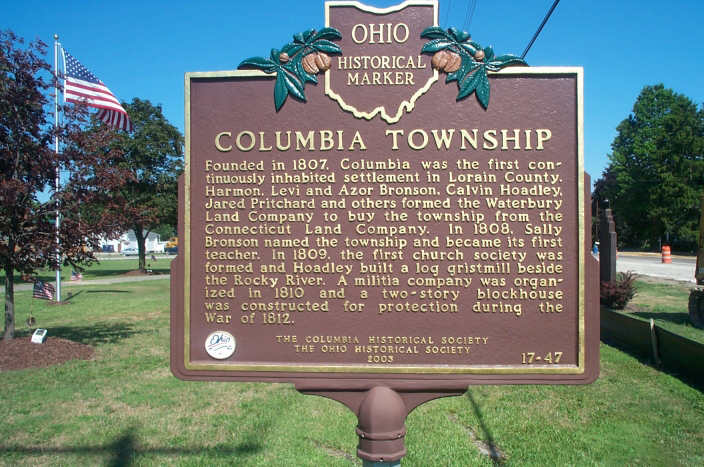
Columbia Historical Marker

Columbia Township was part of the former Connecticut Western Reserve, lands ceded in 1786 by Connecticut after the American Revolution. In 1805, two years after Ohio became a state, the federal government finalized treaties with local Native Americans. The reserve was surveyed and parceled into rough 5-mile-square (8.0 km) blocks (smaller than the typical 6-mile-square (9.7 km) townships in the midwestern United States). The Bronson and Hoadley families of Waterbury, Connecticut, pooled together $20,087 to purchase a township. On April 4, 1807, they drew Township 5 N, Range 15 W from a random selection of townships in the reserve, purchasing the land site-unseen. Since Columbia Township has been continuously inhabited since 1807, it is the longest inhabited settlement in the former Western Reserve west of the Cuyahoga River.

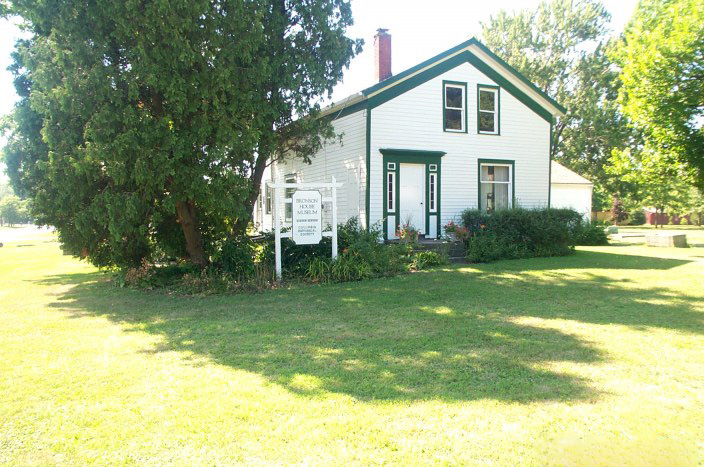
Bronson House Museum

The Copopa School was built in 1921. The name originates as follows:

The first post office in town was established about the year 1817. The first postmaster was Thomas G. Bronson, who kept the office in his house. The name selected was the Indian name for Rocky river, Copokah. In the papers sent from Washington the word was miswritten Copopo, and the error was never corrected.

— History of Lorain County, Ohio (1879)

Farming has historically been the most significant employer in Columbia Township and the surrounding townships, but in the second half of the 19th century, sandstone from the local quarries was mined and widely distributed. Two of the township's quarries were Jaquay Quarry and an area which later became known as Wildwood Lake. Both Jaquay and Wildwood were used as swimming parks in the late 20th century, with Wildwood operating until 2001.

On April 11, 1965, an F4 tornado swept through Columbia Township before dissipating to the east in neighboring Strongsville.

At the 2007 Homecoming, Columbia Township celebrated its bicentenary. For the previous fifty years, the township had not experienced the urban sprawl that developed in neighboring areas, but the number of farms in the township has fallen significantly.

Columbia Township buildings on the National Register of Historic Places include the Columbia Town Hall and the Columbia Baptist Church.

== Government ==
The township is governed by a three-member board of trustees, who are elected in November of odd-numbered years to a four-year term beginning on the following January 1. Two are elected in the year after the presidential election and one is elected in the year before it. There is also an elected township fiscal officer, who serves a four-year term beginning on April 1 of the year after the election, which is held in November of the year before the presidential election. Vacancies in the fiscal officership or on the board of trustees are filled by the remaining trustees.

Columbia Station has a public library, a branch of the Lorain Public Library.

== Parks ==
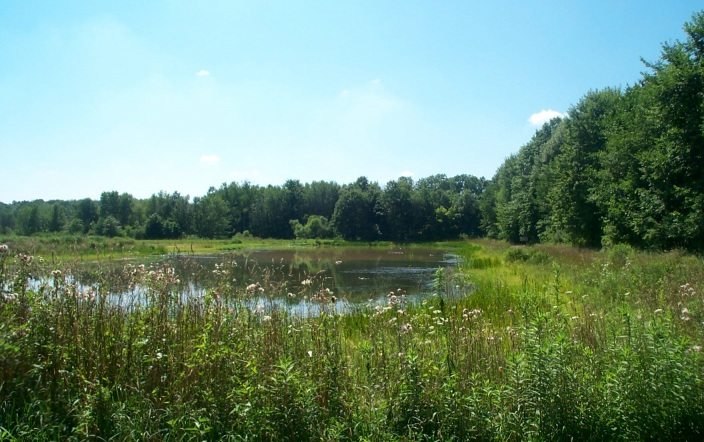
Columbia Reservation

Columbia Veteran's Memorial

The Lorain County Metro Parks opened the Columbia Reservation in 2003, a 409-acre (166 ha) park with 285 acres (115 ha) of high-quality wetlands in the floodplain of the west branch of the Rocky River. The park has 3 miles (5 km) of trails running through ponds, marshes, wet meadows and swamps. The park is popular with bird watchers, as more than 50 species of birds, including the great blue heron, can be seen there. An additional 80 acres (32 ha) are planned to be added to the park.

Columbia Township Park is also located in Columbia Station. It is home to ten ballfields, tennis courts, a basketball court, a children's playground and a walking path on 27.1 acres (11.0 ha). The park also hosts various festivals year-round.

In 2007, the Columbia VFW completed work on a new veterans' memorial located at Columbia Township Park. The memorial was dedicated on Memorial Day 2007 in front of a crowd of over 1,000.
