= Columbia High School (Ohio) =

Public high school in Columbia Station, Ohio, United States

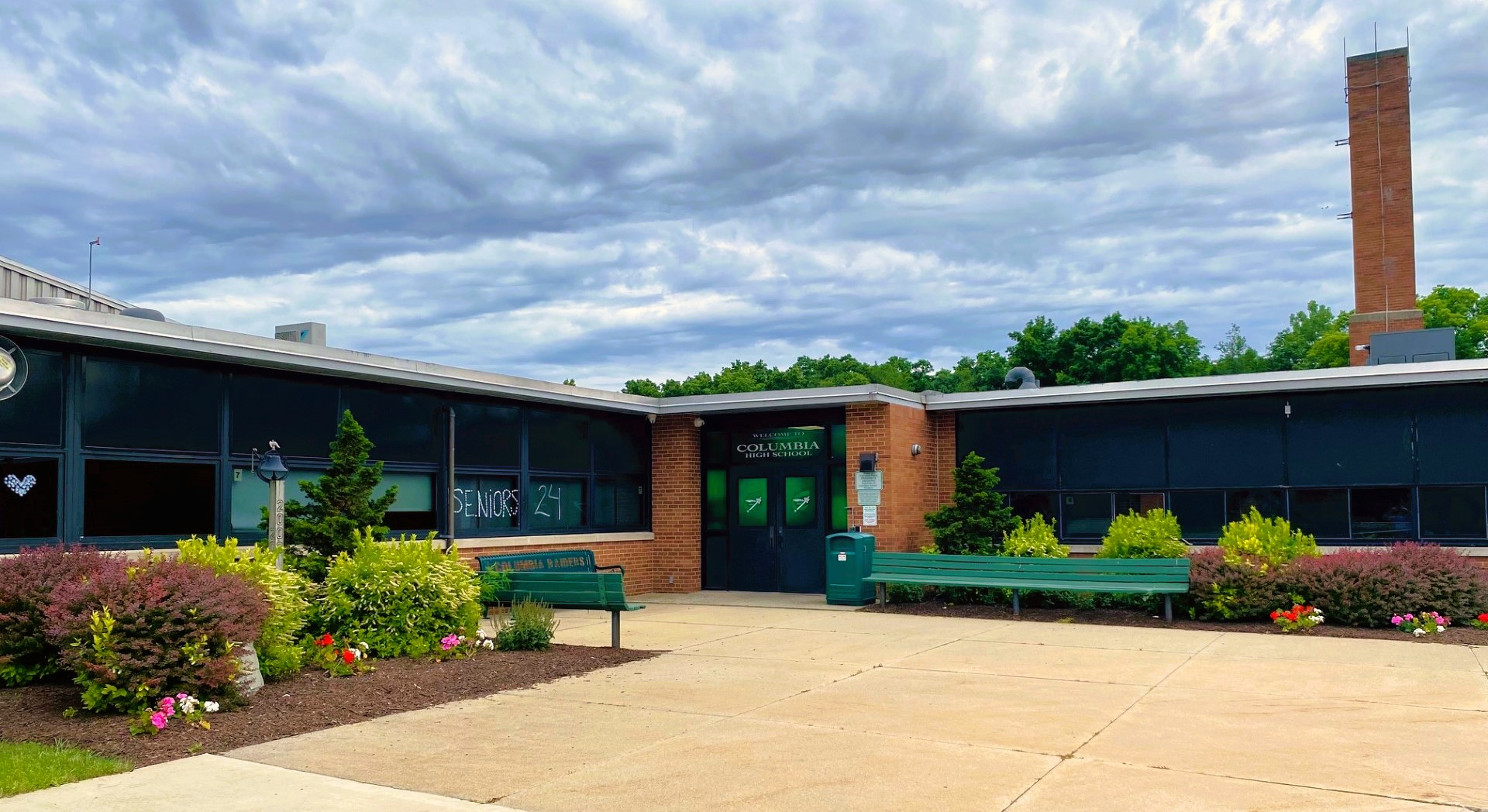

Location
- 14168 West River Road; Columbia Station, Ohio 44028; United States; 41°18′43″N 81°55′30″W

Information
- Type: Public
- Motto: "The path to enlightenment is brightened by those who walk the halls of Columbia High."
- Established: 1924
- School district: Columbia Local School District
- NCES School ID: 390481403123
- Principal: Brian Siftar
- Teaching staff: 21.50 (FTE)
- Grades: 9–12
- Enrollment: 273 (2024–25)
- Student to teacher ratio: 12.27
- Campus: Rural
- Colors: Kelly Green and white
- Athletics conference: Lorain County League (LC8)
- Team name: Raiders
- Rival: Wellington Dukes
- Accreditation: Ohio Department of Education
- Website: www.columbia.k12.oh.us/columbiahighschool_home.aspx

Columbia High School is a public high school located in Columbia Station, Ohio, southwest of Cleveland.

The school colors are kelly green and white. The sports teams are known as the Raiders. The school is a member of the Lorain County League.
