= Black River High School (Sullivan, Ohio) =

Location
- 233 County Road 40; Sullivan, (Ashland County), Ohio 44880; United States
- Coordinates: 41°3′25.5″N 82°10′37.5″W

Information
- Superintendent: Anthony Stretar
- Principal: Tracey Lambdin
- Teaching staff: 21.00 (FTE)
- Grades: 9–12
- Average class size: 23-24
- Student to teacher ratio: 13.48
- Colors: Black and Gold
- Athletics conference: Lorain County League
- Mascot: Pirate
- Team name: Pirates
- USNWR ranking: Rated Excellent
- Yearbook: Echo
- Website: BRLS

Black River High School is a public high school located in Sullivan, Ohio. It was consolidated in 1961 by combining the districts from Homerville, Spencer, and Sullivan.

== Athletics ==
Black River's school colors are black and gold. The mascot is the pirate. The school fight song is "Across The Field". As of 2019, the school is a member of the Lorain County League. Black River had previously been a member of the Firelands Conference from 1964 to 1993, the Mohican Area Conference from 1993 to 2004, and the Patriot Athletic Conference (PAC-12) from 2005 to 2019.

=== Mohican Area Conference championships ===
- Softball - 1999
- Football -1996, 1999, 2002*

=== Firelands Conference championships ===
- Football - 1977, 1984*, 1985*, 1986, 1989, 1990*, 1992*
- Volleyball - 1978
- Boys Basketball - 1964-65*
- Softball - 1988, 1989
- Boys Track & Field - 1985
- Girls Track & Field - 1990
- Cross Country - 1987
- Baseball - 1993

Shared titles are denoted with an asterisk (*).
