= Sheffield, Ohio =

- Village
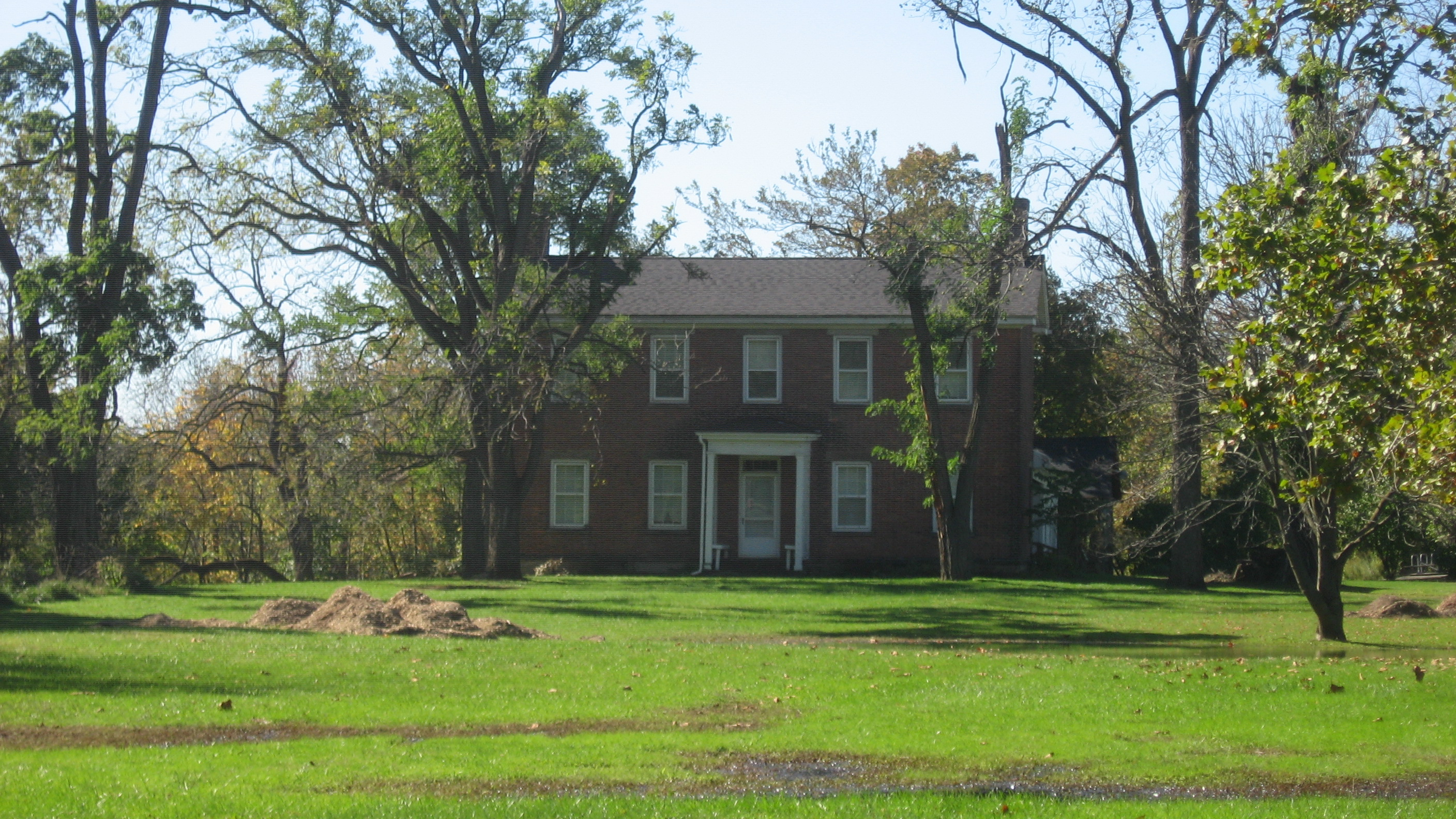
- The old Burrell house

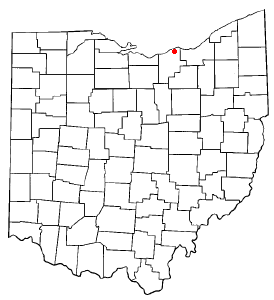
- Location of Sheffield, Ohio

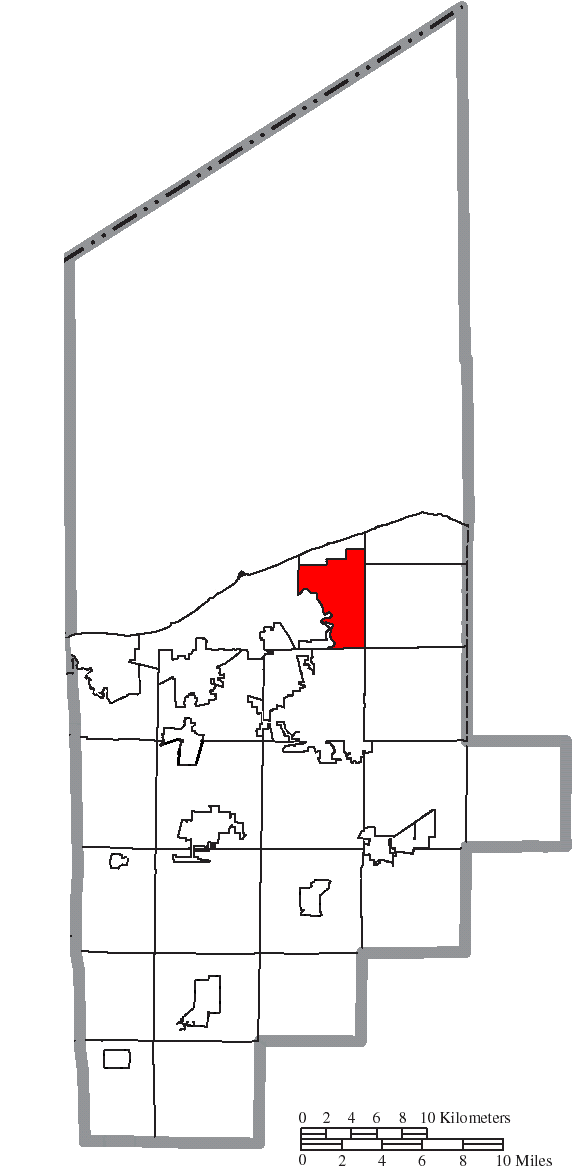
- Location of Sheffield in Lorain County
- Coordinates: 41°27′35″N 82°06′30″W
- Country: United States
- State: Ohio
- County: Lorain

Area
  - Total: 10.84 sq mi (28.08 km^{2})
  - Land: 10.74 sq mi (27.82 km^{2})
  - Water: 0.097 sq mi (0.25 km^{2})
- Elevation: 623 ft (190 m)

Population (2020)
  - Total: 4,135
  - Density: 384.9/sq mi (148.61/km^{2})
- Time zone: UTC-5 (Eastern (EST))
  - Summer (DST): UTC-4 (EDT)
- ZIP code: 44054
- Area code: 440
- FIPS code: 39-72060
- GNIS feature ID: 1086521
- Website: sheffieldvillage.com

Sheffield is a village in Lorain County, Ohio, United States, along the Black River. The population was 4,135 at the 2020 census. It is part of the Cleveland metropolitan area.

== Geography ==
According to the United States Census Bureau, the village has a total area of 10.84 square miles (28.08 km^{2}), of which 10.74 square miles (27.82 km^{2}) is land and 0.10 square miles (0.26 km^{2}) is water.

== Demographics ==
Historical population
Census	Pop.	Note	%±
1940	733		—
1950	1,147		56.5%
1960	1,664		45.1%
1970	1,730		4.0%
1980	1,886		9.0%
1990	1,943		3.0%
2000	2,949		51.8%
2010	3,982		35.0%
2020	4,135		3.8%
U.S. Decennial Census

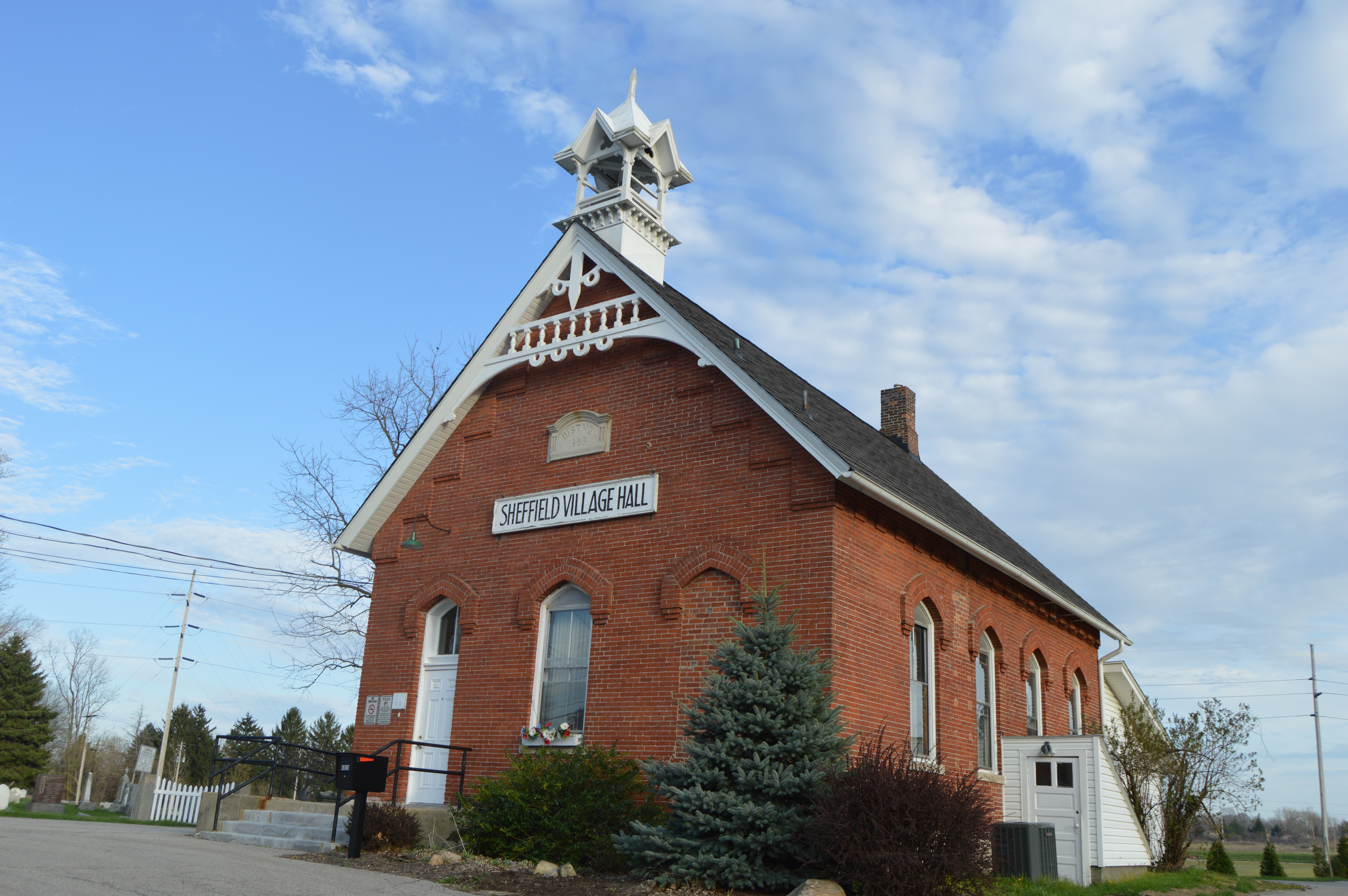
Sheffield Village Hall

=== 2020 census ===
As of the 2020 census, Sheffield had a population of 4,135. The median age was 50.6 years. 15.9% of residents were under the age of 18 and 25.3% of residents were 65 years of age or older. For every 100 females there were 92.5 males, and for every 100 females age 18 and over there were 90.1 males age 18 and over.

79.0% of residents lived in urban areas, while 21.0% lived in rural areas.

There were 1,746 households in Sheffield, of which 22.0% had children under the age of 18 living in them. Of all households, 57.5% were married-couple households, 13.9% were households with a male householder and no spouse or partner present, and 23.1% were households with a female householder and no spouse or partner present. About 24.6% of all households were made up of individuals and 12.0% had someone living alone who was 65 years of age or older.

There were 1,889 housing units, of which 7.6% were vacant. The homeowner vacancy rate was 2.4% and the rental vacancy rate was 9.2%.

Racial composition as of the 2020 census
Race	Number	Percent
White	3,512	84.9%
Black or African American	146	3.5%
American Indian and Alaska Native	6	0.1%
Asian	118	2.9%
Native Hawaiian and Other Pacific Islander	0	0.0%
Some other race	77	1.9%
Two or more races	276	6.7%
Hispanic or Latino (of any race)	239	5.8%

=== 2010 census ===
As of the census of 2010, there were 3,982 people, 1,581 households, and 1,160 families living in the village. The population density was 370.8 inhabitants per square mile (143.2/km^{2}). There were 1,666 housing units at an average density of 155.1 per square mile (59.9/km^{2}). The racial makeup of the village was 89.3% White, 4.0% African American, 0.3% Native American, 2.7% Asian, 1.4% from other races, and 2.2% from two or more races. Hispanic or Latino of any race were 6.1% of the population.

There were 1,581 households, of which 26.9% had children under the age of 18 living with them, 63.3% were married couples living together, 6.9% had a female householder with no husband present, 3.2% had a male householder with no wife present, and 26.6% were non-families. 21.9% of all households were made up of individuals, and 10.7% had someone living alone who was 65 years of age or older. The average household size was 2.51 and the average family size was 2.94.

The median age in the village was 45.2 years. 20.2% of residents were under the age of 18; 6.2% were between the ages of 18 and 24; 23.2% were from 25 to 44; 34.2% were from 45 to 64; and 16.2% were 65 years of age or older. The gender makeup of the village was 49.3% male and 50.7% female.

=== 2000 census ===
As of the census of 2000, there were 2,949 people, 1,089 households, and 866 families living in the village. The population density was 272.6 inhabitants per square mile (105.3/km^{2}). There were 1,147 housing units at an average density of 106.0 per square mile (40.9/km^{2}). The racial makeup of the village was 90.88% White, 4.27% African American, 0.10% Native American, 0.81% Asian, 0.10% Pacific Islander, 2.61% from other races, and 1.22% from two or more races. Hispanic or Latino of any race were 5.93% of the population.

There were 1,089 households, out of which 34.5% had children under the age of 18 living with them, 67.4% were married couples living together, 9.1% had a female householder with no husband present, and 20.4% were non-families. 16.5% of all households were made up of individuals, and 7.3% had someone living alone who was 65 years of age or older. The average household size was 2.71 and the average family size was 3.06.

In the village, the population was spread out, with 26.3% under the age of 18, 6.6% from 18 to 24, 29.3% from 25 to 44, 26.2% from 45 to 64, and 11.6% who were 65 years of age or older. The median age was 39 years. For every 100 females there were 94.4 males. For every 100 females age 18 and over, there were 95.2 males.

The median income for a household in the village was $59,816, and the median income for a family was $66,136. Males had a median income of $43,313 versus $35,174 for females. The per capita income for the village was $25,218. About 2.5% of families and 3.2% of the population were below the poverty line, including 5.1% of those under age 18 and none of those age 65 or over.

== Education ==
Sheffield is served by the Sheffield-Sheffield Lake City Schools.

== Notable person ==
- Lee Richmond, a 19th-century major league baseball pitcher and the first to ever throw a perfect game in the majors, was born in Sheffield.
