= Firelands High School =

Public high school in Oberlin, Ohio, United States

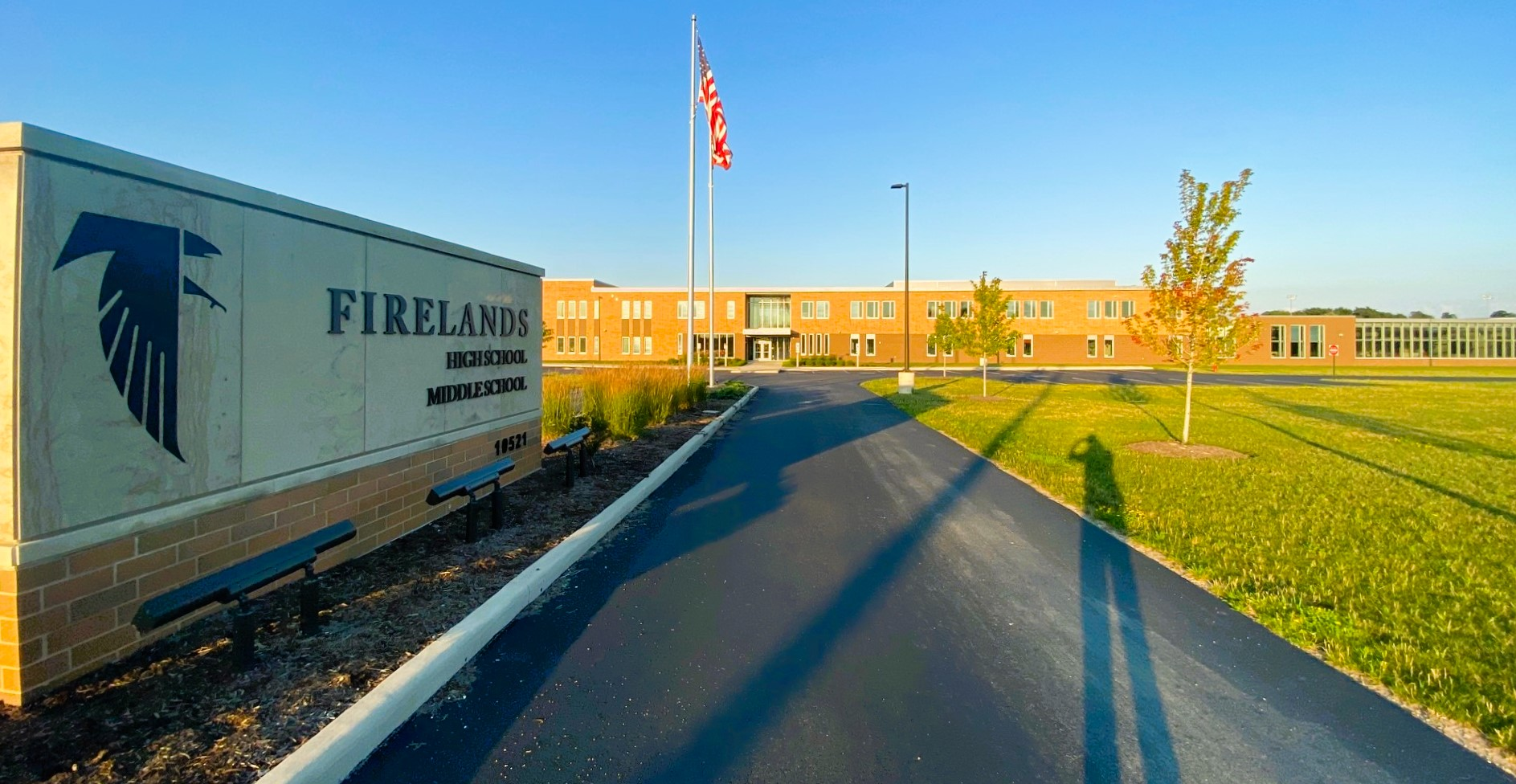

Location
- 10643 Vermilion Road; Oberlin, Ohio 44074; United States
- Coordinates: 41°20′13″N 82°17′56″W

Information
- Type: Public
- Opened: 1952
- NCES School ID: 390481503129
- Principal: Catherine Keener
- Teaching staff: 28.00 (FTE)
- Grades: 9–12
- Enrollment: 471 (2024–2025)
- Student to teacher ratio: 16.82
- Campus type: Rural
- Colors: Red and white
- Athletics conference: Lorain County League
- Team name: Falcons
- Rival: Vermilion Sailors
- Website: www.firelandsschools.org/firelandshighschool_home.aspx

Firelands High School is a public high school in Henrietta Township, near Oberlin, Ohio, in the United States.

Firelands High School absorbed South Amherst High School and its school district during the summer of 1988.

The school serves the townships of Brownhelm, Camden, Florence (in Erie County), Henrietta, New Russia, and the village of South Amherst.

The school's official colors are red and white, and their athletics teams are known as the Falcons. School colors often include black, but it is not an official school color. Firelands won their lone team state championship in boys' cross country in 1982. The school is a member of the Stars division of the Lorain County League as of the 2019–2020 school year. Their primary rival is the Vermilion High School Sailors.
