= Brookside High School =

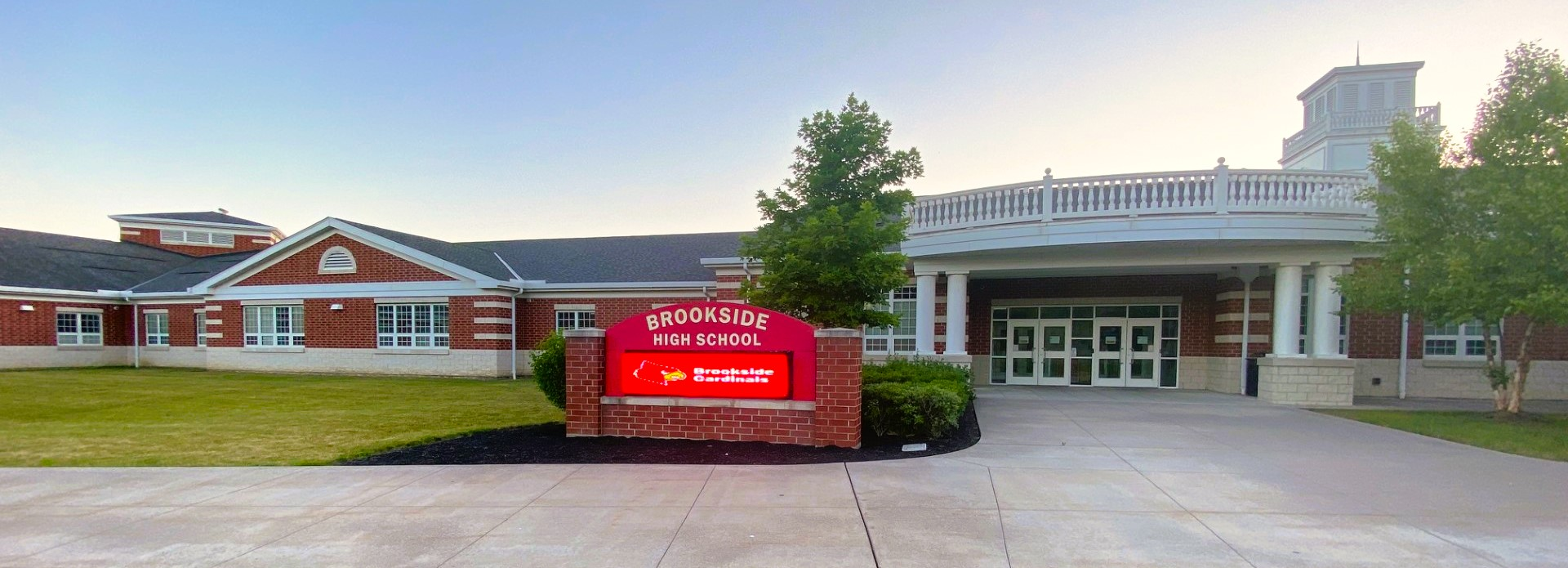

Location
- 1662 Harris Road; Sheffield, (Lorain County), Ohio 44054; United States
- Coordinates: 41°28′2″N 82°5′46″W

Information
- Type: Public, Coeducational high school
- Motto: Inspire, Excite, Educate
- Founded: 1924
- Status: Open
- School district: Sheffield
- Superintendent: Michael Cook
- Principal: Emily Adkins
- Grades: 9-12
- Colors: Red and black
- Fight song: Across the Field
- Athletics conference: Lorain County League
- Mascot: Cardinal
- Nickname: Cards
- Team name: Cardinals
- Rival: Keystone High School
- Athletic Director: Chris Adkins
- Website: bhs.sheffieldschools.org

Brookside High School is a public high school located at 1662 Harris Road in Sheffield, Ohio, 22 miles (35 km) west of Cleveland, Ohio. It is part of Sheffield-Sheffield Lake City School District.

The current high school/middle school building, serving grades 7–12, opened in August 2015. The previous high school is immediately south of the new high school and is used for grades 3–6.

The school colors are red and black. The school mascot is the Cardinal. The school is a member of the Lorain County League. The school offers College Credit Plus (formerly known as PSEO) classes and AP classes and has been rated excellent by the state of Ohio. Some extra curricular activities students can partake, aside from athletics, include Science Olympiad, Academic Challenge, and student council.

Brookside competes in VEX Robotics competitions. The Robotics program launched during the 2013–14 school year. In 2015–16, Brookside Intermediate School added VEX-IQ teams. In 2016-17 Brookside Middle School added VEX-VRC teams. With over 20 robots and over 100 students, this is the largest competitive robotics program in Lorain County. Brookside Robotics have participated in the VEX World Championships in 2017, 2018, and 2019, winning the VEX IQ - Chandra Division Design Award in 2018.

== Notable alumni ==
- Gayle Manning, Ohio State Senator
