= OHSAA Northeast Region defunct athletic conferences =

American high school sports conferences

This is a list of former high school athletic conferences in the Northeast Region of Ohio, as designated by the Ohio High School Athletic Association (OHSAA). If a conference had members that span multiple regions, the conference is placed in the article of the region most of its former members hail from. Because the names of localities and their corresponding high schools do not always match and because there is often a possibility of ambiguity with respect to either the name of a locality or the name of a high school, the following table gives both in every case, with the locality name first, in plain type, and the high school name second in boldface type. The school's team nickname is given last.

== All-American Athletic Conference ==
The All-American Athletic Conference was an OHSAA athletic conference that ran from 1986 until 1990. The league dissolved following the consolidation of Warren G. Harding and Western Reserve and the departure of Niles and Howland.

- **Warren G. Harding** Panthers (1986–90, to Steel Valley)
- **Howland** Tigers (1986–90, to Mahoning Valley)
- **Hubbard** Eagles (1986–90, to Mahoning Valley)
- Niles **McKinley** Dragons (1986–90, to Mahoning Valley)
- Warren **Western Reserve** Raiders (1986–90, consolidated into Warren Harding)

== All-American Conference (football) ==
- Warren **Harding** Panthers (1963–79)
- Canton **McKinley** Bulldogs (1963–79)
- Niles **McKinley** Red Dragons (1963–79)
- Massillon **Washington** Tigers (1963–79)
- **Steubenville** Big Red (1966–79)
- **Alliance** Aviators (1969–79)

== All-American Conference (2008–2020) ==
The All-American Conference was an OHSAA athletic Conference that existed from 2008 until 2020. The league dissolved following the exit of the remaining Blue Tier members, who went on to expand the Mahoning Valley Athletic Conference.

=== 2008–2012 alignment ===
AAC - Blue Tier

- **Champion** Flashes
- **Campbell** Memorial Red Devils
- **Girard** Indians
- Leavittsburg **LaBrae** Vikings
- **Newton Falls** Tigers

AAC - Red

- Lisbon **Beaver Local** Beavers
- **Canfield** Cardinals
- **Howland** Tigers
- Niles **McKinley** Red Dragons
- **Poland Seminary** Bulldogs

AAC - White

- **Hubbard** Eagles
- Cortland **Lakeview** Bulldogs
- Youngstown **Liberty** Leopards
- **Struthers** Wildcats
- **Salem** Quakers

=== 2012–2014 alignment ===
AAC - American

- Lisbon **Beaver Local** Beavers
- **Canfield** Cardinals
- **Hubbard** Eagles
- **Struthers** Wildcats
- **Poland Seminary** Bulldogs
- **Howland** Tigers
- Niles **McKinley** Red Dragons

AAC - National

- Youngstown **Liberty** Leopards
- **Jefferson Area** Falcons
- Campbell **Memorial** Red Devils
- Cortland **Lakeview** Bulldogs
- **Champion** Flashes
- Leavittsburg **LaBrae** Vikings
- **Newton Falls** Tigers
- **Girard** Indians

=== 2015–2017 alignment ===
AAC - Blue

- **Brookfield** Warriors
- Leavittsburg **LaBrae** Vikings
- **Champion** Flashes
- Youngstown **Liberty** Leopards
- Campbell **Memorial** Red Devils
- **Girard** Indians
- **Newton Falls** Tigers

AAC - Gold

- **Boardman** Spartans
- **Warren G. Harding** Raiders
- **Austintown Fitch** Falcons
- Ashtabula **Lakeside** Dragons

AAC - Red

- **Canfield** Cardinals
- **Poland Seminary** Bulldogs
- **Howland** Tigers
- Youngstown **East** Golden Bears
- Niles **McKinley** Red Dragons

AAC - White

- Cortland **Lakeview** Bulldogs
- **Poland Seminary** Bulldogs
- **Struthers** Wildcats
- **Hubbard** Eagles
- Niles **McKinley** Red Dragons
- **Jefferson Area** Falcons
- Ashtabula **Edgewood** Warriors

=== 2018 Alignment ===
AAC - Blue

- **Brookfield** Warriors
- Leavittsburg **LaBrae** Vikings
- **Champion** Flashes
- Youngstown **Liberty** Leopards
- Campbell **Memorial** Red Devils
- **Girard** Indians
- **Newton Falls** Tigers

AAC - Gold

- **Boardman** Spartans
- **Warren G. Harding** Raiders
- **Austintown Fitch** Falcons

AAC - Red

- **Canfield** Cardinals
- **Poland Seminary** Bulldogs
- **Howland** Tigers
- Youngstown **East** Golden Bears
- Niles **McKinley** Red Dragons

AAC - White

- Cortland **Lakeview** Bulldogs
- **Poland Seminary** Bulldogs
- **Struthers** Wildcats
- **Hubbard** Eagles
- Niles **McKinley** Red Dragons
- **Jefferson Area** Falcons
- Ashtabula **Edgewood** Warriors

=== 2019 Alignment ===
- **Brookfield** Warriors
- Columbiana **Crestview** Rebels
- **Champion** Flashes
- Campbell **Memorial** Red Devils
- Youngstown **Liberty** Leopards
- Leavittsburg **LaBrae** Vikings
- **Newton Falls** Tigers

=== Former Members ===
- **Salem** Quakers (2008–2011, to Northeastern Buckeye Conference)
- Lisbon **Beaver Local** Beavers (played concurrently in OVAC, 2008–2013, to Buckeye 8 Athletic League, Red Division 2008–11, American Division 2011–13.)
- **Girard** Indians (2008–2018, to Northeast 8 Conference)
- **Hubbard** Eagles (2008–2018, to Northeast 8 Conference)
- **Jefferson Area** Falcons (2011–2018, to Northeast 8 Conference)
- Cortland **Lakeview** Bulldogs (2008–2018, to Northeast 8 Conference)
- **Niles McKinley** Red Dragons (2008–2018, to Northeast 8 Conference)
- Poland **Poland Seminary** Bulldogs (2008–2018, to Northeast 8 Conference)
- **Struthers** Wildcats (2008–2018, to Northeast 8 Conference)
- Ashtabula **Edgewood** Warriors (2014–2019, to Chagrin Valley Conference)
- Ashtabula **Lakeside** Dragons (2015–2019, to Chagrin Valley Conference)
- Youngstown **East** Golden Bears (2014–19, to Steel Valley Conference)
- **Brookfield** Warriors (2014–2020, to Mahoning Valley Athletic Conference)
- Campbell **Memorial** Red Devils (2008–2020, to Mahoning Valley Athletic Conference)
- **Champion** Golden Flashes (2008–2020, to Mahoning Valley Athletic Conference)
- Columbiana **Crestview** Rebels (2019–2020, to Mahoning Valley Athletic Conference)
- Leavittsburg **LaBrae** Vikings (2008–2020, to Mahoning Valley Athletic Conference)
- **Liberty** Leopards (2008–2020, to Mahoning Valley Athletic Conference)
- **Newton Falls** Tigers (2008–2020, to Mahoning Valley Athletic Conference)

== All-Ohio Conference/League ==
The league began as the AOC in 1976, as the Chippewa Conference split into this league and the Pioneer League. After Coventry replaced Tuscarawas Valley in 1983, the name was changed to the AOL.

- Navarre **Fairless** Falcons (1976–89, to PAC-7)
- Canal Fulton **Northwest** Indians (1977–89, to Northeastern Buckeye)
- **Orrville** Red Riders (1976–1989, to Ohio Heartland Conference 1999–2003)
- Wooster **Triway** Titans (1976–1989, to Mohican Area)
- Millersburg **West Holmes** Knights (1976–1989, to Mohican Area)
- Zoarville **Tuscarawas Valley** Trojans (1977-1983)
- **Manchester** Panthers (1976–89, to PAC-7)
- **Coventry** Comets (1983–89, to PAC-7)

== Ashland County League ==
- **Albion** Britons (1929–38, consolidated into Homerville)
- **Hayesville** Panthers (1929–63, consolidated into Hillsdale)
- **Jeromesville** Blue Jays (1929–63, consolidated into Hillsdale)
- **Loudonville** Redbirds (1929–62, moved to Johnny Appleseed Conference)
- **Nankin** Knights (1929–37, consolidated into Polk)
- **Nova** Trojans (1929–49, consolidated into Ruggles-Troy)
- **Perrysville** Admirals (1929–61, consolidated into Loudonville)
- **Polk** Presidents (1929–63, consolidated into Mapleton)
- **Ruggles** Redskins (1929–49, consolidated into Ruggles-Troy)
- **Savannah** Sailors (1929–62, consolidated into Crestview)
- **Sullivan** Bobcats (1929–58, consolidated into Black River)
- **Ruggles-Troy** Golden Flashes (1949–63, consolidated into Mapleton)
- Sullivan **Black River** Pirates (1958–63, moved to Firelands)

== Chippewa Conference ==
The Chippewa Conference was an OHSAA athletic conference that existed from 1963 until 1977. The league dissolved following the exit of its members to the Pioneer and All-Ohio conferences.

- **Brunswick** Blue Devils (1963–77, to Pioneer)
- Lodi **Cloverleaf** Colts (1963–77, to Pioneer)
- **Orrville** Red Riders (1963–1976, to All-Ohio)
- **Wadsworth** Grizzlies (1963–77, to Pioneer)
- Millersburg **West Holmes** Knights (1968–1976, to All-Ohio)
- Wooster **Triway** Titans (1970–1976, to All-Ohio)

== Crown Conference (1968–1980) ==
- Cleveland **Cathedral Latin** Lions (1967–79)
- Parma Heights **Holy Name** Green Wave (1967–80)
- Mentor **Lake Catholic** Cougars (1970–80)
- Parma **Padua Franciscan** Bruins (1967–80)
- Lakewood **St. Edward** Eagles (1967–80)
- Cleveland **St. Joseph** Vikings (1967–80)
- Bedford **St. Peter Chanel** Firebirds (1967–80)

== Crown Conference (2021–2024) ==
- Cleveland Heights **Beaumont** Blue Streaks (2021–24)
- Mentor **Lake Catholic** Cougars (2021–24)
- Chardon **Notre Dame-Cathedral Latin** Lions (2021–24)
- Parma **Padua Franciscan** Bruins (2021–24)
- Cleveland **Villa Angela-St. Joseph** Vikings (2021–22)
- Cuyahoga Falls **Walsh Jesuit** Warriors (2021–24)

== Cuyahoga County Conference/League (1920s–1929) ==
"A" League

- **Berea** Braves (192?–29)
- Lyndhurst **Brush** Arcs (192?–29)
- **Cleveland Heights** Tigers (192?–28)
- **Euclid** Panthers (192?–29)
- **Garfield Heights** Bulldogs (192?–29)
- **Independence** Blue Devils (192?–29)
- **Maple Heights** Mustangs (192?–29)
- **Rocky River** Pirates (192?–27)
- Parma **Schaar** Redmen (192?–29)
- East Cleveland **Shaw** Cardinals (192?–28)
- **Mayfield** Wildcats (1927–29)

"B" League

- Bay Village **Bay** Rockets (192?–29)
- **Beachwood** Bison (192?–29)
- Broadview Heights **Brecksville-Broadview Heights** Bees (192?–29)
- **Brooklyn** Hurricanes (192?–29)
- **Chagrin Falls** Tigers (192?–29)
- **Cuyahoga Heights** Redskins (192?–29)
- Fairview Park **Fairview** Warriors (192?–29)
- **Mayfield** Wildcats (192?–27, to "A" League)
- **North Olmstead** Eagles (192?–29)
- **North Royalton** Bears (192?–29)
- **Olmsted Falls** Bulldogs (192?–29)
- Pepper Pike **Orange** Lions (192?–29)
- **Richmond Heights** Spartans (192?–29)
- **Solon** Comets (192?–29)
- **Strongsville** Mustangs (192?–29)
- **Warrensville Heights** Tigers (192?–29)
- **Westlake** Demons (192?–29)

== Cuyahoga County Conference (1954–1956) ==
- **Beachwood** Bison (1954–56)
- Broadview Heights **Brecksville-Broadview Heights** Bees (1954–1956)
- **Brooklyn** Hurricanes (1954–1956)
- Lyndhurst **Brush** Arcs (1954–56)
- **Chagrin Falls** Tigers (1954–56)
- **Cuyahoga Heights** Redskins (1954–1956)
- **Independence** Blue Devils (1954–1956)
- **Mayfield** Wildcats (1954–56)
- **North Royalton** Bears (1954–1956)
- Pepper Pike **Orange** Lions (1954–56)
- **Richmond Heights** Spartans (1954-1956)
- **Solon** Comets (1954–56)
- **Strongsville** Mustangs (1954–1956)
- **Warrensville Heights** Tigers (1954–1956)

== Cuyahoga County Conference 1964–1979 ==
- Broadview Heights **Brecksville-Broadview Heights** Bees (1964–1977)
- **Brooklyn** Hurricanes (1964–1979)
- **Cuyahoga Heights** Redskins (1964–1979)
- **Independence** Blue Devils (1964–1979)
- **North Royalton** Bears (1964–1977)
- **Richmond Heights** Spartans (1964–1968)
- **Strongsville** Mustangs (1964–1977)
- **Warrensville Heights** Tigers (1964–1979)
- Rocky River **Lutheran West** Longhorns (1968–1970)

== East Suburban Conference ==
The East Suburban Conference was an OHSAA athletic Conference that existed from 1968 until 2008. The league dissolved after the remaining members went on to form the Northeastern Athletic Conference.

- **Beachwood** Bison (1968–89, to MAC-8)
- Burton **Berkshire** Badgers (1968–96, to Chagrin Valley Conference)
- Middlefield **Cardinal** Huskies (1968–96, to CVC)
- **Kirtland** Hornets (1968–96, to CVC)
- **Newbury** Black Knights (1968–98, to CVC)
- **Richmond Heights** Spartans (1968–89, to MAC-8)
- Fairport Harbor **Harding** Skippers (1970–76 to Grand River, 1989–2005 to CVC)
- **Chardon** Hilltoppers (1980–83, to CVC)
- **Aurora** Greenmen (1983–89, to MAC-8)
- **Perry** Pirates (1984–96, to CVC)
- Thompson **Ledgemont** Redskins (1989–2008, to NAC)
- Orwell **Grand Valley** Mustangs (1989–98, to CVC)
- Vienna **Mathews** Mustangs (1989–91 to Inter-County, football only 2004–08 to NAC)
- Andover **Pymatuning Valley** Lakers (1989–98 to Northeastern, football only 2004-2008 to NAC)
- Bristolville **Bristol** Panthers (1992–2002; no Football, to NAC)
- North Bloomfield **Bloomfield** Cardinals (1996–2002; no Football, to NAC)
- Southington **Chalker** Wildcats (1996–2002; football 1996–2008, to NAC)
- **Lordstown** Red Devils (1996–2002; no Football, to NAC)
- Cortland **Maplewood** Rockets (1996–2002; no Football, to NAC)
- Ashtabula **St. John & Paul** Fighting Heralds (1996–2008; became independent)
- Cuyahoga Falls **Cuyahoga Valley Christian Academy** Royals (1998–2001; to Principals)
- Cleveland Heights **Lutheran East** Falcons (1998–2008, to NAC football-only)
- **Cleveland Central Catholic** Ironmen (football only 2004–06, to North Coast)
- **Youngstown Christian** Eagles (2005–08 became independent)

== Erie Coast Conference ==
- **Elyria Catholic** Panthers (1977–1986)
- **Elyria West** Wolverines (1977–1986 to Lorain County)
- **Lorain Catholic** Spartans (1977–1986)
- Lorain **Southview** Saints (1977–1986)

== Erie Shore Conference ==
- Lorain **Admiral King** Admirals (1987–1997)
- **Elyria** Pioneers (1987–1997)
- **Lorain** Steelmen (1987–1995, school closed)
- Grafton **Midview** Middies (1987–1996)
- **North Ridgeville** Rangers (1987–1997)
- **Sandusky** Blue Streaks (1987–1997)
- Lorain **Southview** Saints (1987–1997)
- **Vermilion** Sailors (1987–1997)

== Freeway Conference ==
The Freeway Conference was an OHSAA athletic Conference that existed from 1962 until 1968. The league dissolved following the exit of Mayfield, Mentor and South to join the original GCC.

- **Mayfield** Wildcats (1962–1968, to Greater Cleveland)
- **Mentor** Cardinals (1962–1968, to Greater Cleveland)
- Painesville **Harvey** Red Raiders (1962–1968)
- Painesville **Riverside** Beavers (1962–1968)
- **Wickliffe** Blue Devils (1962–1968)
- Willoughby **South** Rebels (1962–1968, to Greater Cleveland)

== Grand River Conference ==
The Grand River Conference was an OHSAA athletic Conference that existed from 1972 until 1989. The league was dissolved to form the East Suburban Conference in 1989.

- Orwell **Grand Valley** Mustangs (1972–89, to East Suburban)
- Thompson **Ledgemont** Redskins (1972–89, to East Suburban)
- **Perry** Pirates (1972–84, to East Suburban)
- Andover **Pymatuning Valley** Lakers (1972–89, to East Suburban)
- **Jefferson** Falcons (1974–87, to Northeastern)
- Fairport Harbor **Harding** Skippers (1976–89, to East Suburban)
- Southington **Chalker** Wildcats (1978–82, 1987-89; football only))
- Vienna **Mathews** Mustangs (1985–89; football only, to East Suburban))

== Great Lakes Conference ==
East Division

- **Buckeye** Bucks (2019–2024)
- **Holy Name** Green Wave (2015–2024)
- **Lakewood** Rangers (2020–2024)
- Parma **Normandy** Invaders (2015–2024)
- Parma Heights **Valley Forge** Patriots (2015–2024)
- **Parma Senior** Redmen (2015–2023)

West Division

- **Bay Village** Bay Rockets (2015–2024)
- **Elyria Catholic** Panthers (2015–2024)
- **Fairview** Warriors (2019–2023)
- **North Olmsted** Eagles (2021–2024)
- **Rocky River** Pirates (2015–2024)
- **Westlake** Demons (2021–2024)

== Greater Cleveland Conference (1950–1998) ==
The Greater Cleveland Conference existed from 1950–1998. A second form of the conference formed in 2015.

- **Bedford** Bearcats (1950–1998, to Lake Erie)
- **Berea** Braves (1950–1975, to Lake Erie)
- **Euclid** Panthers (1950–1998, to Lake Erie)
- **Garfield Heights** Bulldogs (1950–1968, to Lake Erie)
- **Maple Heights** Mustangs (1950–1998, to Lake Erie)
- Middleburg Heights **Midpark** Meteors (1950–1975, to Lake Erie)
- **Willoughby Union** Rangers (1950–58, split into Eastlake North and Willoughby South)
- Eastlake **North** Rangers (1958–1998, to Premier)
- **Mentor** Cardinals (1968–1993, to Lake Erie)
- **Mayfield** Wildcats (1968–1998, to Western Reserve)
- Willoughby **South** Rebels (1968–1998, to Premier)
- Lyndhurst **Brush** Arcs (1975–1998, to Western Reserve)
- Macedonia **Nordonia** Knights (1994–1997, to Western Reserve)

== Hall of Fame Conference ==
The Hall of Fame Conference was an OHSAA football athletic conference that existed from 1972 until 1975. The league dissolved following the closure of Lehman and Lincoln High Schools.

- Louisville **St. Thomas Aquinas** Knights (1972–1975)
- Canton **Central Catholic** Crusaders (1972–1975)
- Canton **Lehman** Polar Bears (1972–1975 school closed)
- Canton **Lincoln** Lions (1972–1975 school closed)
- Canton **Timken** Trojans (1972–1975)

== Inland Conference ==
The Inland Conference was an OHSAA athletic conference that existed from 1957 until 1989. The league dissolved following the exit of the remaining schools, who left for the Metropolitan Athletic Conference.

- **Avon** Eagles (1957–1986 to Lorain County)
- Sheffield **Brookside** Cardinals (1957–1970 to Lakeland Conference)
- Medina **Buckeye** Bucks (1957–1989)
- Columbia Station **Columbia** Raiders (1957–1989 to Metropolitan Athletic)
- Oberlin **Firelands** Falcons (1957–1986 to Lorain County)
- Medina **Highland** Hornets (1957–1976 to Suburban)
- LaGrange **Keystone** Wildcats (1957–1986 to Lorain County)
- **South Amherst** Cavaliers (1957–1988 consolidated into Firelands)
- Rocky River **Lutheran West** Longhorns (1970–1989 to Metropolitan Athletic)
- **Cuyahoga Heights** Redskins (1979–1989 to Metropolitan Athletic)
- **Brooklyn** Hurricanes (1979–1989 to Metropolitan Athletic)
- **Independence** Blue Devils (1979–1989 to Metropolitan Athletic)

== Inter-County League ==
The Inter-County League was an OHSAA athletic conference that existed from 1951 until 2006. The league was dissolved and reformed into the Inter-Tri County League in 2006.

- **Canfield** Cardinals (1951–60, to Turnpike Conference)
- **Columbiana** Clippers (1951–56, to Tri-County League, 1976–91, to Tri-County League)
- Damascus **Goshen Union** Gophers (1951–59, consolidated into West Branch)
- **Lowellville** Rockets (1951–2006, to ITCL)
- **McDonald** Blue Devils (1951–2006, to ITCL)
- **North Lima** Zippers (1951–69, consolidated into South Range)
- New Middletown **Springfield** Tigers (1951–60, to Turnpike Conference, 1969–2006, to ITCL)
- North Jackson **Jackson-Milton** Blue Jays (1954–60, to Turnpike Conference, 1967–2006, to ITCL)
- **Greenford** Bobcats (1956–69, consolidated into South Range)
- Columbiana **Crestview** Rebels (1957–74, to Tri-County League)
- Berlin Center **Western Reserve** Blue Devils (1959–2006, to ITCL)
- **Mineral Ridge** Rams (1961–2006, to ITCL)
- North Lima **South Range** Raiders (1969–2006, to ITCL)
- Vienna **Mathews** Mustangs (1991–2003, to Northeastern Athletic Conference; 2004 football only)
- Sebring **McKinley** Trojans (2005–06, to ITCL)

== Inter-Tri County League ==
Blue Division

- North Jackson **Jackson-Milton** Blue Jays (2006–2017, to MVAC)
- **Lowellville** Rockets (2006–2017, to MVAC)
- **McDonald** Blue Devils (2006–2017, to MVAC)
- Sebring **McKinley** Trojans (2006–2017, to MVAC)
- **Mineral Ridge** Rams (2006–2017, to MVAC)
- Berlin Center **Western Reserve** Blue Devils (2006–2017, to MVAC)

Red Division

- Columbiana **Crestview** Rebels (2006–2017, to Ohio Valley Athletic Conference)
- **East Palestine** Bulldogs (2006–2017, to EOAC)
- Canfield/North Lima **South Range** Raiders (2006–2017, to Independent, to Northeast 8 Conference 2019.)
- New Middletown **Springfield** Tigers (2006–2017, to MVAC)
- Hanoverton **United** Golden Eagles (2006–2017, to EOAC)

White Division

- Lisbon **David Anderson** Blue Devils (2006–2017, to EOAC)
- **Columbiana** Clippers (2006–2017, to EOAC)
- **Leetonia** Bears (2006–2017, to EOAC)
- Salineville **Southern Local** Indians (2006–2017, to EOAC)
- **Wellsville** Tigers (2006–2017, to EOAC)

== Lake County League/Western Reserve Conference (1920s–1968) ==
The Lake County League was an OHSAA athletic conference that operated from the 1920s until 1968. It was renamed to the Western Reserve Conference in 1948.

- Ashtabula **Edgewood** Warriors (1962–1965 to Northeastern)
- Ashtabula **Harbor** Mariners (1951–1965 to Northeastern)
- **Conneaut** Spartans (1951–1959 to Northeastern)
- Conneaut **Rowe** Vikings (1951–1964 consolidated into Conneaut)
- **Fairport Harding** Skippers (1948–1951; 1962–1968 to Northeastern in 1952, to Lake Shore in 1968)
- Geneva **Spencer** Wildcats (1957–1961 consolidated into Geneva)
- **Jefferson Area** Falcons (1954–1968 to Northeastern)
- **Kirtland** Hornets (1948–1960 to Great Lakes)
- **Madison** Blue Streaks (1948–1968 to Lake Shore)
- Painesville **Harvey** Red Raiders (?–1928)
- **Perry** Pirates (?–1968 to Lake Shore)
- **Wickliffe** Blue Devils (?–1957 to Northeastern)
- Willougby **Union** Rangers (?–1928 to Lake Shore)

== Lake Erie League ==
- **Bedford** Bearcats (1998–2025)
- **Garfield Heights** Bulldogs (1968–2007; 2020–2025; Football 1968–86; 1993-2007 to Northeast Ohio)
- **Lorain** Titans (2010–2025)
- **Maple Heights** Mustangs (1998-2025)
- East Cleveland **Shaw** Cardinals (1928-2025)
- **Warrensville Heights** Tigers (1993-2025, [Football 1993–2014, 2016-2025])

Former members

- **Cleveland Heights** Tigers (1928–2023, to Greater Cleveland Conference)
- Cleveland Heights **Lutheran East** Falcons (2017–2019; all sports except football)
- **Elyria** Pioneers (1923–54, to Buckeye Conference. 1997–2003, to Pioneer)
- **Lakewood** Rangers (1923–2007, to Northeast Ohio)
- **Lorain** Steelmen (1923–54, to Buckeye Conference)
- **Rocky River** Pirates (1923–37, to Southwestern)
- **Parma** Redmen (1951–2003, to Pioneer)
- Lyndhurst **Brush** Arcs (1962–75, to Greater Cleveland)
- Parma Heights **Valley Forge** Patriots (1962–2003, to Pioneer)
- Parma **Normandy** Invaders (1968–2003, to Pioneer)
- **Shaker Heights** Red Raiders (1923-2012, to Northeast Ohio, 2020-2023, to Greater Cleveland Conference)
- **Berea** Braves (1975–79, to Pioneer)
- Middleburg Heights **Midpark** Meteors (1975–79, to Pioneer)
- **Mentor** Cardinals (1993–2011, to Northeast Ohio)
- **Euclid** Panthers (1998–2015, to Greater Cleveland)
- Lorain **Admiral King** Admirals (2002–10, consolidated into Lorain)
- Lorain **Southview** Saints (2002–10, consolidated into Lorain)
- Warren **Warren G. Harding** Raiders (2010–2013, to All-American, football through 2014 season)

== Lakeland Conference ==
- Lorain **Clearview** Clippers (1953–1986)
- **Huron** Tigers (1953–1968)
- Castalia **Margaretta** Polar Bears (1953–1961)
- **New London** Wildcats (1953–1970)
- **Vermilion** Sailors (1953–1986)
- **Wellington** Dukes (1953–1986)
- Amherst **Marion L. Steele** Comets (Amherst until 1958, 1954–1986)
- **Avon Lake** Shoremen (1961–1964)
- Grafton **Midview** Middies (1961–1986)
- **North Ridgeville** Rangers (1961–1986)
- **Oberlin** Indians (1964–1986)
- Sheffield **Brookside** Cardinals (1970–1986)

== Lorain County Conference (1986–2005) ==
- **Avon** Eagles (1986–2005, to West Shore)
- Sheffield **Brookside** Cardinals (1986–2005, to Patriot)
- Lorain **Clearview** Clippers (1986–2005, to Patriot)
- Oberlin **Firelands** Falcons (1986–2005, to West Shore)
- LaGrange **Keystone** Wildcats (1986–2005, to Patriot)
- **Oberlin** Phoenix (1986–2005, to Patriot)
- **Wellington** Dukes (1986–2005, to Patriot)
- Elyria **West** Wolverines (1986–1996, school closed, consolidated into Elyria)
- Grafton **Midview** Middies (1996–2005, to West Shore)

== Lorain County League (1924–1961) ==
- **Avon** Eagles^{1} (1924–61, to Inland)
- **Avon Lake** Shoremen (1924–1961, to Lakeland)
- **Belden** Bees (1924–55, consolidated into Midview)
- **Brighton** Bears (1924–52, consolidated into Wellington)
- Sheffield **Brookside** Cardinals^{1} (1924–61, to Inland)
- **Brownhelm** Bombers (1924–52, consolidated into Firelands)
- Kipton **Camden** Knights (1924–52, consolidated into Firelands)
- Columbia Station **Columbia** Raiders^{1} (1924–61, to Inland)
- Grafton **Eaton** Eels (1924–55, consolidated into Midview)
- **Grafton** Comets (1924–55, consolidated into Midview)
- **Henrietta** Hawks (1924–52, consolidated into Firelands)
- **LaGrange** Wildcats (1924–59, consolidated into Keystone)
- **North Ridgeville** Rangers (1924–27, to Northern Ohio Athletic League (NOAL), 1933–61, to Lakeland)
- **Penfield** Bombers (1924–59, consolidated into Keystone)
- **South Amherst** Cavaliers^{1} (1924–61, to Inland)
- **Wellington** Dukes (1924–27, to NOAL)
- Lorain **Clearview** Clippers (1928–38, to NOAL, 1947–53, to Lakeland)
- Oberlin **Firelands** Falcons^{1} (1952–61, to Inland)
- Grafton **Midview** Middies (1955–61, to Lakeland)
- Lagrange **Keystone** Wildcats^{2} (1959–61)
1. Concurrent with Inland Conference 1957–61.
2. Concurrent with Inland Conference 1959–61.

Division Alignments

LCL Divisions 1924-38
Eastern	Western
Avon	Brighton
Avon Lake	Brownhelm
Belden	Camden
Brookside	Clearfield (1928–38)
Columbia	Henrietta
Eaton	LaGrange (1933–38)
Grafton	Oberlin (1924–37)
LaGrange (1928–33)	Penfield
North Ridgeville (1924–27, 1933-)	South Amherst
	Wellington (1924–27)

LCL Divisions 1938-47
Northeast	Southeast	West
Avon	Belden	Brighton
Avon Lake	Columbia	Brownhelm
Brookside	Grafton	Camden
Eaton	LaGrange	Henrietta
North Ridgeville	Penfield	South Amherst

LCL Divisions 1947-55
Eastern	Western
Avon	Brighton (1947–52)
Avon Lake	Brownhelm (1947–52)
Belden	Brookside (1952–55)
Brookside (1947–52)	Camden (1947–52)
Columbia	Clearview (1948–53)
Eaton	Firelands (1952-)
Grafton	Henrietta (1947–52)
North Ridgeville	LaGrange
	Penfield
	South Amherst

== Mahoning Valley Conference/Metro Athletic Conference ==
The MVC began in 1972, and changed its name to the MAC in 1994. In 2008 the league (minus East Liverpool) merged with the Trumbull Athletic Conference to become the All-American Conference.

- **Canfield** Cardinals (1972–2008)
- **Girard** Indians (1972–2000)
- Warren **John F. Kennedy** Eagles (1972–94)
- Liberty Leopards (1972–1979)
- Poland **Poland Seminary** Bulldogs (1972–2008)
- **Salem** Quakers (1978–2008)
- **Struthers** Wildcats (1979–2008)
- Beloit West Branch Warriors (1972–1981)
- Campbell **Memorial** Red Devils (1980–94, 2006–08)
- **Howland** Tigers (1972–1975, 1994–2008; Football 1995–2008)
- Niles **McKinley** Dragons (1994–2008; Football 1995–2008)
- **Alliance** Aviators (2003–05)
- **East Liverpool** Potters (2006–08)

== Metro League ==
- **Coventry** Comets (1936–1969, to Suburban)
- Akron **Ellet** Orangemen (1936–1971, to Akron City)
- Lakemore **Springfield** Spartans (1936–1993, to Northeastern Buckeye)
- **Kent State** Blue Devils (1936–1945, 1950–1953, to Portage County)
- **Stow-Munroe Falls** Bulldogs (1936–1996, merged into Western Reserve)
- **Norton** Panthers (1940–1972, to Suburban)
- **North Canton** Vikings (1945–1952, to Stark County A)
- **Tallmadge** Blue Devils (1949–1990, to Suburban)
- **Wadsworth** Grizzlies (1954–1963, to Chippewa)
- Kent **Roosevelt** Rough Riders (1954–1996, merged into Western Reserve)
- **Ravenna** Ravens (1963–1996, merged into Western Reserve)
- Macedonia **Nordonia** Knights (1973–1994, to Greater Cleveland)
- Brimfield **Field** Falcons (1976–1978, to Suburban)
- **Cuyahoga Falls** Black Tigers (1978–1996, merged into Western Reserve)
- **Barberton** Magics (1988–1996, merged into Western Reserve)

== Metropolitan Area Conference (MAC-8) ==
- **Aurora** Greenmen (1989–96, to Chagrin Valley Conference)
- **Beachwood** Bison (1989–2005, to Chagrin Valley Conference)
- **Brooklyn** Hurricanes (1989–2005, to Patriot Athletic Conference)
- Columbia Station **Columbia** Raiders (1989–2005, to Patriot Athletic Conference)
- **Cuyahoga Heights** Redskins (1989–2005, to Chagrin Valley Conference)
- **Independence** Blue Devils (1989–2005, to Chagrin Valley Conference)
- Rocky River **Lutheran West** Longhorns (1989–2005, to Patriot Athletic Conference)
- **Richmond Heights** Spartans (1989–2005, to Chagrin Valley Conference)
- Gates Mills **Gilmour Academy** Lancers (1996–2005)

== Mohican Area Conference ==
- Bellville **Clear Fork** Colts (1989–2004, to Ohio Cardinal)
- **Loudonville** Redbirds (1989–2004, to Mid-Buckeye)
- Millersburg **West Holmes** Knights (1989–2003, to Ohio Cardinal)
- Wooster **Triway** Titans (1989–2004, to Principals)
- Medina **Buckeye** Bucks (1993–2004, to Patriot 2005)
- Sullivan **Black River** Pirates (1993–2004, to Patriot 2005)

== North Central Conference (Cleveland area) ==
- Bedford **St. Peter Chanel** Firebirds (1974–1983)
- **Cleveland Central Catholic** Ironmen (1968–1983)
- Cleveland **Our Lady of Lourdes** Crusaders (?–1968, consolidated into Cleveland Central Catholic)
- Cleveland **St. John Cantius** Jayhawks (?–1968, consolidated into Cleveland Central Catholic)
- Cleveland **St. Stanislaus** Panthers (?–1968, consolidated into Cleveland Central Catholic)
- **Elyria Catholic** Panthers
- Gates Mills **Gilmour Academy** Lancers
- Garfield Heights **Trinity** Trojans (1977–1983)
- Lorain **St. Mary's** Fighting Irish
- **Lorain Catholic** Spartans
- Mentor **Lake Catholic** Cougars (1972–1977)
- Parma **Byzantine Catholic** Buccaneers (closed 1975)
- **Warrensville Heights** Tigers (1979–1983)

== North Coast League ==
North Coast League (1984–2020)

- Akron **Archbishop Hoban** Knights (2005–2020)
- Cleveland Heights **Beaumont** BlueStreaks (girls' only, 2011–2020)
- Cleveland **Benedictine** Bengals (boys' only, 2011–2020)
- **Cleveland Central Catholic** Ironmen (1984–2004, 2006–2020)
- **Elyria Catholic** Panthers (1985-2011)
- Gates Mills **Gilmour Academy** Lancers (2018–2020)
- Parma Heights **Holy Name** Green Wave (1984–2015)
- Warren **John F. Kennedy** Eagles (2011–2020)
- Mentor **Lake Catholic** Cougars (1984–2020)
- Chardon **Notre Dame-Cathedral Latin** Lions (1988–2020)
- Parma **Padua Franciscan** Bruins (1984–2020)
- Cleveland **St. Joseph Academy** Jaguars (girls' only, 2018–2020)
- Bedford **St. Peter Chanel** Firebirds (1984–2013)
- Louisville **St. Thomas Aquinas** Knights (2013–2019)
- Garfield Heights **Trinity** Trojans (1984–2019)
- Youngstown **Valley Christian** Eagles (2015–2017)
- Cleveland **Villa Angela-St. Joseph** Vikings (2004–2020)
- Cuyahoga Falls **Walsh Jesuit** Warriors (2011–2020)

== Northeastern Buckeye Conference ==
- **Alliance** Aviators (2005–2018; to Eastern Buckeye)
- **Dover** Tornadoes (1989–1993; to ECOL)
- **Carrollton** Warriors (1989–2018; to Eastern Buckeye)
- **Canton South** Wildcats (1990–2018; to Eastern Buckeye)
- **Louisville** Leopards (1990–2018; to Independent)
- Lexington **Marlington** Dukes (1989–2018; to Eastern Buckeye)
- **Minerva** Lions (1989–2018; to Eastern Buckeye)
- Lawrence **Northwest** Indians (1989–2011; to Independent)
- **Salem** Quakers (2011–2018; to Eastern Buckeye)
- Lakemore **Springfield** Spartans (1993–2005; to Portage Trail)
- **West Branch** Warriors (1989–2018; to Eastern Buckeye)

== Northeastern Conference ==
- **Ashtabula** Panthers (1951–2001, consolidated into Lakeside)
- Fairport Harbor **Fairport Harding** Skippers (1951–1962)
- **Geneva** Eagles (1951–2011, to Premier)
- Painesville **Harvey** Red Raiders (1951–1962, to Freeway; 1987–2009, to Chagrin Valley-Chagrin)
- **Mentor** Cardinals (1951–1962, to Freeway)
- Painesville **Riverside** Beavers (1951–1962, to Freeway; 1976–1998, to Premier)
- **Wickliffe** Blue Devils (1957–1962, to Freeway)
- **Conneaut** Spartans (1958–2009, became independent)
- Willoughby **South** Rebels (1960–1962, to Freeway)
- Ashtabula **St. John** Heralds (1962–1996, to East Suburban)
- Ashtabula **Edgewood** Warriors (1965–2010, became independent)
- Ashtabula **Harbor** Mariners (1965–2001, consolidated into Lakeside)
- **Jefferson** Falcons (1968–1973, 1987–2011, became independent)
- Andover **Pymatuning Valley** Lakers (1968–1973, to Grand River; 1998–2002, to Northeastern Athletic)
- **Madison** Blue Streaks (1972–1998, to Premier)
- Ashtabula **Lakeside** Dragons (2001–2007, to Premier)

== Northeast Ohio Conference (2007–2015) ==
- **Brunswick** Blue Devils (2007–15, to Greater Cleveland Conference)
- Lyndhurst **Brush** Arcs (2007–15, to Western Reserve Conference)
- **Cuyahoga Falls** Black Tigers (2007–15, to Suburban League)
- **Elyria** Pioneers (2007–15, to Greater Cleveland Conference)
- **Garfield Heights** Bulldogs (2007–15, to Independents)
- **Hudson** Explorers (2007–15, to Suburban League)
- **Lakewood** Rangers (2007–12, to West Shore Conference)
- **Mayfield** Wildcats (2007–15, to Western Reserve Conference)
- **Medina** Battling Bees (2007–15, to Greater Cleveland Conference)
- Macedonia **Nordonia** Knights (2007–11, to Suburban League)
- Parma **Normandy** Invaders (2007–15, to Great Lakes Conference)
- **North Royalton** Bears (2007–15, to Suburban League)
- **Parma** Redmen (2007–15, to Great Lakes Conference)
- **Solon** Comets (2007–15, to Greater Cleveland Conference)
- **Stow-Munroe Falls** Bulldogs (2007–15, to Suburban League)
- **Strongsville** Mustangs (2007–15, to Greater Cleveland Conference)
- **Twinsburg** Tigers (2007–15, to Suburban League)
- Parma Heights **Valley Forge** Patriots (2007–15, to Great Lakes Conference)
- **Mentor** Cardinals (2011–15, to Greater Cleveland Conference)
- **Shaker Heights** Red Raiders (2012–15, to Greater Cleveland Conference)

=== Football divisions ===
Northeast Ohio Conference Divisions (2007-2014 seasons, unless noted)
Lake Division	River Division	Valley Division
Brush	Cuyahoga Falls (2007-2012)	Brunswick
Cuyahoga Falls (2013-2014)	Elyria (2009-2014)	Elyria (2007-2008)
Garfield Heights (2009-2014)	Garfield Heights (2007-2008)	Hudson (2013-2014)
Lakewood (2011)	Hudson (2007-2012)	Lakewood (2007-2008)
Normandy	Lakewood (2009-2010)	Mayfield (2009-2010)
North Royalton (2007-2010)	Mayfield (2007-2008, 2011–2014)	Medina (2007-2012)
Parma	Medina (2013-2014)	Mentor (2011-2014)
Shaker Heights (2012)	Nordonia (2007-2008)	Nordonia (2009-2010)
Twinsburg (2007-2008)	North Royalton (2011-2014)	Solon
Valley Forge	Shaker Heights (2013-2014)	Strongsville
	Stow	Twinsburg (2011-2014)
	Twinsburg (2009-2010)	

== Northeast Ohio Conference (1970–1977) ==
- Akron **Archbishop Hoban** Knights (1970–1977)
- **Barberton** Magics (1970–1977)
- **Cuyahoga Falls** Black Tigers (1970–1977)
- Akron **St. Vincent** Fighting Irish (1970–1972 consolidated into St. Vincent St. Mary)
- Akron **St. Vincent-St. Mary** Fighting Irish (1970–1977)
- Lorain **Southview** Saints (1970–1977)
- Warren **Western Reserve** Raiders (1970–1977)

== Northern Ohio Athletic League ==
- **Amherst** Comets (1927–47, to Southwestern Conference)
- **Medina** Bees (1927–47, to Southwestern Conference)
- **New London** Wildcats (1927–47, to Firelands League)
- **North Ridgeville** Rangers (1927-1933, to Lorain County League)
- **Vermilion** Sailors (1927–47, to Firelands League)
- **Wadsworth** Grizzlies (1927-1931, to Western Reserve League)
- **Wellington** Dukes (1927–45, to Southwestern Conference)
- Lorain **Clearview** Clippers (1938–47, to Southwestern Conference)

== Ohio Scholastic League (football) ==
- **Alliance** Aviators (1948–51)
- **Mansfield** Tigers (1948–1951)
- Massillon **Washington** Tigers (1948–1951)
- Canton **McKinley** Bulldogs (1949–1951)
- Toledo **Waite** Indians (1948–1951)
- **Warren G. Harding** Panthers (1948–1951)

== Pioneer Conference ==
- **Brecksville-Broadview Heights** Bees (1977–2005)
- **Brunswick** Blue Devils (1977–2007)
- Lodi **Cloverleaf** Colts (1977–1997)
- **North Royalton** Bears (1977–2007)
- **Strongsville** Mustangs (1977–2007)
- **Wadsworth** Grizzlies (1977–1984)
- **Berea** Braves (1979–2005)
- Middleburg Heights **Midpark** Meteors (1979–2005)
- **Medina** Battling Bees (1986–2007)
- **North Ridgeville** Rangers (1997–2005)
- **Elyria** Pioneers (2003–2007)
- Parma **Normandy** Invaders (2003–2007)
- **Parma** Redmen (2003–2007)
- Parma Heights **Valley Forge** Patriots (2003–2007)

Pioneer Conference Divisions, 2003–05
Frontier	Heritage
Brunswick	Berea
Elyria	Brecksville-Broadview Heights
Medina	Midpark
Parma	Normandy
Strongsville	North Ridgeville
Valley Forge	North Royalton

== Portage Trail Conference ==
All-time members

- Garrettsville **James A. Garfield** G-Men (2005–2021, to Mahoning Valley Athletic)
- **East Canton** Hornets (2005–2013, to Inter-Valley)
- Kent **Roosevelt** Rough Riders (2005–2015, to Suburban League-American)
- Atwater **Waterloo** Vikings (2005–2017, to Mahoning Valley Athletic)
- **Windham** Bombers (2005–2013, to Northeastern Athletic)
- Westfield **Cloverleaf** Colts (2015–2020, to Metro Athletic Conference)
- **Coventry** Comets (2005–2020, to Metro Athletic Conference)
- Brimfield **Field** Falcons (2005–2020, to Metro Athletic Conference)
- Lake Township **Lake Center Christian** Tigers (no football) (2015–2025)
- **Mogadore** Wildcats (2005–2025, independent)
- **Norton** Panthers (2005–2020, to Metro Athletic Conference)
- **Ravenna** Ravens (2005–2020, to Metro Athletic Conference)
- **Rootstown** Rovers (2005–2025, to Chagrin Valley Conference)
- Palmyra **Southeast** Pirates (2005−2024 to Mahoning Valley Athletic)
- Lakemore **Springfield** Spartans (2005–2020, to Metro Athletic Conference)
- **Streetsboro** Rockets (2005–2020, to Metro Athletic Conference)
- Louisville **St. Thomas Aquinas** Knights (2020−2025)
- Warren **John F. Kennedy** Eagles (2020–2025)
- Cuyahoga Falls **Woodridge** Bulldogs (2005–2020, to Metro Athletic Conference)
- Youngstown **Valley Christian** Eagles (2017–2020, to Eastern Ohio Athletic Conference)

== Portage County League ==
One of the longest-surviving county leagues, the PCL existed from 1918 until 2005 when its remaining members helped to create the Portage Trail Conference.

- **Atwater** Spartans (c.1920s–1967, consolidated into Waterloo)
- **Aurora** Greenmen (c.1920s–64, joined Chagrin Valley Conference)
- **Brimfield** Bears (1918–1929, became K–8 school; consolidated into Field in 1961)
- **Charlestown** Wildcats (c.1920s–1950, consolidated into Southeast)
- **Deerfield** Bison (c.1920s–1950, consolidated into Southeast)
- **Edinburgh** Scots (c.1920s–1950, consolidated into Southeast)
- **Freedom** Yellowjackets (c.1920s–1951, consolidated into Garfield)
- **Garrettsville** G-Men (1920s–1951, consolidated into Garfield)
- Garrettsville **Garfield** G-Men (1951–2005, joined PTC)
- **Hiram** Huskies (1918–1964, consolidated into Crestwood)
- **Mantua** Hilltoppers/Big Red/Red Devils (1918–1951, consolidated into Crestwood (Note: Crestwood was known as Mantua–Shalersville from 1951 to 1955))
- Mantua Center **Mantua Township** Trojans (1918–1948, consolidated into Mantua)
- **Mogadore** Wildcats (c.1920s–1957; 1968–2005, joined PTC)
- **Nelson** Pirates (c.1920s–1948, consolidated into Garrettsville)
- Palmyra **Southeast** Pirates (1950–1958, 1961–2005, joined PTC)
- **Palmyra** (1918–1950, consolidated into Southeast)
- Wayland **Paris** Nightriders (c.1920s–1950, consolidated into Southeast)
- **Randolph** Tigers (c.1920s–1967, consolidated into Waterloo)
- **Ravenna Township** Bulldogs (1918–1960, consolidated into Ravenna)
- **Rootstown** Rovers (c.1920s–2005, joined PTC)
- **Shalersville** Rams/Owls (c.1920s–1951, consolidated into Crestwood)
- **Streetsboro** Rockets (c.1920s–1950, became K–8 school; 1963–2005, joined PTC)
- **Suffield** Big Red (Note: Suffield was also known as the 'Red Devils' or 'Red Riders') (c.1920s–1961, consolidated into Field)
- **Windham** Bombers/Yellow Jackets (c.1920s–1953, 1961–2005, joined PTC)
- Mantua **Crestwood** Red Devils (1951–1958, 1961–2005, joined PTC)
- Kent **State** Statesmen (1960–1972, school closed)
- Brimfield **Field** Falcons (Note: Field used the 'Big Red' nickname from Suffield until 1975 and were known as the 'Big Red Falcons' for the 1975–76 school year) (1961–1976, 1990–2005, joined PTC)
- Atwater **Waterloo** Vikings (1967–2005, joined PTC)
- Peninsula **Woodridge** Bulldogs (1978–2005, joined PTC)

== Premier Athletic Conference ==
- **Chardon** Hilltoppers (1998–2015, to Western Reserve Conference)
- Ashtabula **Lakeside** Dragons (2007–15, to All-American Conference)
- **Geneva** Eagles (2009–15, to Chagrin Valley Conference)
- **Madison** Blue Streaks (1998–2015, to Western Reserve Conference)
- Eastlake **North** Rangers (1998–2015, to Western Reserve Conference)
- Painesville **Riverside** Beavers (1998–2015, to Western Reserve Conference)
- Willoughby **South** Rebels (1998–2015, to Western Reserve Conference)
- Hunting Valley **University** Preppers (2009–15, to Independents)

== Section One League ==
Originally the Stark County B League, this league ended in 1960, as its last remaining member moved to the Stark County AA League.

- **Beach City** Pirates (1921–60, consolidated into Fairless)
- **Brewster** Railroaders (1921–60, consolidated into Fairless)
- **Canal Fulton** Indians (1921–52, consolidated into Northwest)
- **East Sparta** Spartans (1921–53, consolidated into Sandy Valley)
- **Greentown** Greyhounds (1921–53, consolidated into North Canton)
- **Hartville** Blue Streaks (1921–58, consolidated into Lake)
- **Lexington** Lions (1921–57, consolidated into Marlington)
- **Magnolia** Panthers (1921–53, consolidated into Sandy Valley)
- **Marlboro** Dukes (1921–57, consolidated into Marlington)
- **Navarre** Rams (1921–60, consolidated into Fairless)
- **Uniontown** Bobcats (1921–58, consolidated into Lake)
- **Washington** Warriors (1921–57, consolidated into Marlington)
- **Waynesburg** Mohawks (1921–53, consolidated into Sandy Valley)
- Canton **Oakwood** Golden Raiders (1933–60, to Stark County AA League)

== Senate League ==
Originally the Stark County A League when formed in 1921, the league adjusted its name when Ohio went from "A"/"B" classification to "AA"/"A" in 1957. When the Federal League split off in 1964, the remaining members renamed their league the SL in response. The League folded in 1989, as its remaining members split to help form two new leagues.

- **Alliance** Aviators (1921–53, to Big 8 Conference)
- **Canton South** Wildcats (1921–64, to Federal League)
- **East Canton** Hornets (1921–88, to PAC-7 1989)
- Canton **Glenwood/Middlebranch** Eagles (1921–64, to Federal League)
- North Canton **Hoover/North Canton** Vikings (1921–68, to Federal League)
- Canton **Jackson** Polar Bears (1921–64, to Federal League)
- **Louisville** Leopards (1921–32, to Tri-County League)
- **Minerva** Lions (1921–32, to Tri-County League; 1973–89, to Northeastern Buckeye Conference)
- Canal Fulton **Northwest** Indians (1952–77, to All-Ohio League)
- Magnolia **Sandy Valley** Cardinals (1953–64, to Federal League; 1968–89, to PAC-7)
- Massilon **Perry** Panthers (1956–64, to Federal League)
- Marlboro **Marlington** Dukes (1957–64, to Federal League)
- Uniontown **Lake** Blue Streaks (1958–87, to Federal League)
- Navarre **Fairless** Falcons (1960–64, to Federal League)
- Canton **Oakwood** Golden Raiders (1960–68, to Federal League)
- Tuscarawas Township **Tuslaw** Mustangs (1960–89, to PAC-7)
- **Starsburg-Franklin** Tigers (1968–71, to Inter-Valley Conference)
- Zoarville **Tuscarawas Valley** Trojans (1968–74, to Inter-Valley Conference 1974–1977, to All-Ohio Conference 1977–1983; 1983–89 to PAC-7)
- **Carrollton** Warriors (1974–89, to Northeastern Buckeye Conference)
- Uhrichsville **Claymont** Mustangs (1974–89, to East Central Ohio League)
- **Dover** Tornadoes (1987–89, to Northeastern Buckeye Conference)

== Steel Valley Conference (2019–2025) ==
- Youngstown **Cardinal Mooney** Cardinals (2019–2025)
- Youngstown **Chaney** Cowboys (2019–2025)
- Youngstown **East** Golden Bears (2019–2025)
- Youngstown **Ursuline** Fighting Irish (2019–2025)

== Steel Valley Conference (1949–2009) ==
- **Austintown-Fitch** Falcons (1949–2003)
- **Boardman** Spartans (1951–2003)
- **Brookfield** Warriors (1959–68)
- Youngstown **Cardinal Mooney** Cardinals (1970–2009)
- **Campbell Memorial** Red Devils (1949–80)
- Youngstown **Chaney** Cowboys (2003–09)
- **Girard** Indians (1949–71)
- Youngstown **East** Golden Bears (2007–09)
- **Howland** Tigers (1975–85)
- **Hubbard** Eagles (1949–80)
- Warren **John F. Kennedy** Eagles (2003–09; Independent in football)
- Niles **McKinley** Red Dragons (1949–57, 1982–85)
- **Struthers** Wildcats (1949–79)
- Youngstown **Ursuline** Fighting Irish (1970–2009)
- Warren **Western Reserve** Raiders (1980–85)
- Warren **Warren G. Harding** Panthers (1982–85, 1991-2009)

== Tomahawk Conference (Northeast) ==
- Mantua **Crestwood** Red Devils (1958–1961)
- Palmyra **Southeast** Pirates (1958–1961)
- Ravenna Ravens (1958–1961, except football)
- **Windham** Bombers (1958–1961)

== Tri-County League (Northeast) ==
Formed in 1932, this league (along with the Inter-County League) merged to form the Inter-Tri County League in 2006.

- **Boardman** Spartans (1932–51)
- **Columbiana** Clippers (1932–51, 1956–76, 1991–2006)
- Lisbon **David Anderson** Blue Devils (1932-, 2006)
- **East Palestine** Bulldogs (1932–76, 1990–2006)
- **Leetonia** Bears (1932–35, 1950–2006)
- **Louisville** Leopards (1932–66)
- Sebring **McKinley** Trojans (1932-2005)
- **Minerva** Lions (1932–73)
- Poland **Poland Seminary** Bulldogs (1951–72)
- Bergholz **Springfield Local** Flying Tigers (1972–88, consolidated into Edison South)
- Hanoverton **United** Golden Eagles (1972-2006)
- Lisbon **Beaver Local** Beavers (1974–76)
- Salineville **Southern Local** Indians (1974-2006)
- Hammondsville **Stanton** Red Raiders (1974–88, re-branded as Edison North)
- **Toronto** Red Knights (1974–76)
- **Wellsville** Tigers (1974–76, 2005–06)
- Columbiana **Crestview** Rebels (1975-2006)

Football Divisions 1974 & 1975 seasons:

Tier I	Tier II
Beaver	Crestview (1975)
Columbiana	Leetonia
East Palestine	Lisbon
Toronto	Sebring
Wellsville	Southern
	Springfield
	Stanton
	United

== Trolley League ==
The Trolley League was an OHSAA athletic conference that existed from 1919 until 1929. It was announced in November 1918 initially formed as an informal association for basketball, with play beginning in January 1919, followed by a track meet later that year. Early membership was fluid, with 16 teams initially listed in September 1919 for the inaugural football season, but by the end of the season in November, only 5 teams are mentioned as members. For the 1920 football season, only 4 teams listed. It disbanded in 1929 after the city of Kenmore was annexed into Akron and Kenmore High School joined the Akron City Series, followed by Cuyahoga Falls going independent and Bedford and Ravenna deciding to leave for other conferences. Kent Roosevelt and Kent State High Schools attempted to reorganize the league for 1930, but nothing ever came of it. Instead, Kent Roosevelt and Kent State helped form the Western Reserve League in 1932, which was later joined by Ravenna and Cuyahoga Falls.

- **Bedford** Bearcats (1919, 1922–1929, to Eastern Greater Cleveland Conference)
- **Kenmore** Cardinals (1919–1929, to Akron City Series)
- **Cuyahoga Falls** Black Tigers (1919–1929, independent)
- Kent **Roosevelt** Rough Riders (1919–1929, independent)
- **Kent State** Blue Devils (1920 (Note: Kent State joined during the 1920–21 basketball season and the 1921 football season)–1929, independent)
- **Ravenna** Ravens (1919–1929, to Northeastern Ohio Big Ten)

== Trumbull Interscholastic Conference/Association ==
The TIC/TIA was a former OHSAA athletic conference that existed between the early 1920s until the 1960s.

- **Bazetta** Eagles (later became Cortland 1956)
- **Bloomfield** Cardinals
- **Braceville** Bees (later became LaBrae, 1970)
- **Bristol** Panthers
- **Champion** Flashes
- **Cortland** Bulldogs (later became Lakeview, 1961)
- **Farmington** Indians (school closed, merged into Bristol, 1988)
- **Fowler** Wolverines (later became Mathews, 1961)
- **Greene** White Eagles (later became Maplewood, 1960)
- **Gustavus** Tomcats (later became Badger, 1960)
- **Hartford** Bobcats (later became Badger, 1960)
- **Howland** Tigers
- **Johnston** Red Rangers (later became Maplewood, 1960)
- **Kinsman** Clippers (later became Badger, 1960)
- **Leavittsburg** Yellow Jackets (later became LaBrae, 1960)
- **Liberty** Leopards
- **Lordstown** Red Devils
- **McDonald** Blue Devils
- **Mecca** Rockets (later became Maplewood, 1960)
- **Mesopotamia** Tigers (later became Bloomfield)
- **Mineral Ridge** Ramblers (mascot later became Rams)
- **Newton Falls** Tigers
- Southington **Chalker** Wildcats
- **Vernon** Tigers (later became Badger, 1960)
- **Vienna** Flyers (later became Mathews, 1961)

== Trumbull AA League/Trumbull Athletic Conference ==
The Trumbull Athletic Conference began in 1952 as the Trumbull A League. The three original members were Brookfield, Howland, and Newton Falls. When the OHSAA changed the names of its size classes in 1956, the Trumbull A League was renamed the Trumbull AA League. It became the Trumbull Athletic Conference in 1990. Conference football competition began in 1968. Newton Falls was the only school that remained in the league from its beginning until its merger with the Metro Athletic Conference in 2008, forming the All-American Conference.

- **Brookfield** Warriors 1952–1959; to Steel Valley Conference, 1973–1977; independent, 1987–2008; to All-American Conference)
- **Canfield** Cardinals (1968–1971 to Mahoning Valley)
- **Champion** Flashes (1956–2008 to All-American)
- **Cortland** Bulldogs (1960–1961 consolidated into Lakeview)
- Cortland **Lakeview** Bulldogs (1961–2008; to All-American)
- **East Palestine** Bulldogs (1987–1990 to Tri-County)
- **Girard** Indians (2001–2008 to All-American)
- **Hubbard** Eagles (1990–2008 to All-American)
- **Howland** Tigers (1952–1971 to Mahoning Valley)
- Kinsman **Badger** Braves (1961–2003 to Northeast Athletic)
- Leavittsburg **LaBrae** Vikings (1970–2008 to All-American)
- **Leavittsburg** Yellow Jackets (1953–1970 consolidated into LaBrae)
- **Liberty** Leopards (1956–71 to Mahoning Valley; 1979–2008 to All- American)
- **Mathews** Mustangs (1973–1982 to Independent)
- **Newton Falls** Tigers (1952–2008 to All-American)

== Western Reserve Conference (1996–2007) ==
The Western Reserve Conference was an OHSAA athletic conference that existed from 1996 until 2007. The remaining members of the conference merged with the Pioneer Conference in 2007 to form the Northeast Ohio Conference.

- Bainbridge **Kenston** Bombers (1996–2005 to Chargin Valley)
- **Barberton** Magic (1996–2005 to Suburban)
- Chesterland **West Geauga** Wolverines (1996–1998 to Chargin Valley)
- **Cuyahoga Falls** Black Tigers (1996–2007 to Northeast Ohio)
- **Hudson** Explorers (1997–2007 to Northeast Ohio)
- Kent **Roosevelt** Rough Riders (1996–2005 to Portage Trail)
- Lyndhurst **Brush** Arcs (1996–2007 to Northeast Ohio)
- **Nordonia** Knights (1997–2007 to Northeast Ohio)
- **Mayfield** Wildcats (1998–2007 (to Northeast Ohio)
- Pepper Pike **Orange** Lions (1996–1998 to Chagrin Valley
- **Ravenna** Ravens (1996–2005 to Portage Trail)
- **Solon** Comets (1996–2007 to Northeast Ohio)
- **Stow-Monore Falls** Bulldogs (1996–2007 to Northeast Ohio)
- **Twinsburg** Tigers (1996–2007 to Northeast Ohio)

== Western Reserve Conference (2015–2026) ==
Main article: Western Reserve Conference

- **Brush** Arcs (2015–2021; to Independent)
- **Chardon** Hilltoppers (2015–2026; to Chagrin Valley)
- Auburn/Bainbridge **Kenston** Bombers (2015–2026; to Suburban)
- **Mayfield** Wildcats (2015–2026; to Suburban)
- **Madison** Blue Streaks (2015–2023; to Chagrin Valley)
- Eastlake **North** Rangers (2015–2026; to Chagrin Valley)
- Painesville **Riverside** Beavers (2015–2026)
- Willoughby **South** Rebels (2015–2026; to Chagrin Valley)

== West Shore Conference ==
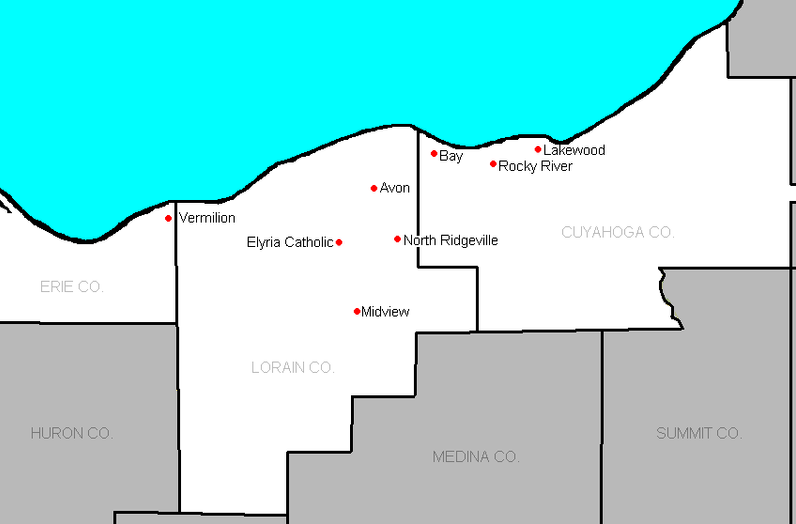
The current member schools of the West Shore Conference through 2012 are in red.

- **Avon** Eagles (2005–2015, to Southwestern Conference)
- Bay Village **Bay** Rockets (2005–2015, to Great Lakes Conference)
- Fairview Park **Fairview** Warriors (2005–2011, to Patriot Athletic Conference)
- Oberlin **Firelands** Falcons (2005–2011, to Patriot Athletic Conference)
- Grafton **Midview** Middies (2005–2015, to Southwestern Conference)
- **North Ridgeville** Rangers (2005–2015, to Southwestern Conference)
- **Rocky River** Pirates (2005–2015, to Great Lakes Conference)
- **Vermilion** Sailors (2005–2015, to Sandusky Bay 2016)
- **Elyria Catholic** Panthers (2011–2015, to Great Lakes Conference)
- **Lakewood** Rangers (2012–2015, to Southwestern Conference)

== Youngstown City Series ==
- Youngstown **East** Golden Bears (1925–98, school closed)
- Youngstown **North** Bulldogs (1925–80, school closed)
- Youngstown **Rayen** Tigers (1925-2003, to Steel Valley)
- Youngstown **South** Warriors (1925–93, school closed)
- Youngstown **Wilson** Presidents/Redmen (1936-2003, to Steel Valley)
- Youngstown **Cardinal Mooney** Cardinals (1958–70, to Steel Valley)
- Youngstown **Ursuline** Fighting Irish (1958–70, to Steel Valley)
- Youngstown **Chaney** Cowboys (1960–2003, to Steel Valley)
- Canton **Timken** Trojans (1999–2003, became independent)

== See also ==
- Ohio High School Athletic Association
- Ohio High School Athletic Conferences
- OHSAA Northeast Region athletic conferences
