= Berkshire Local School District =

School district in Ohio, United States

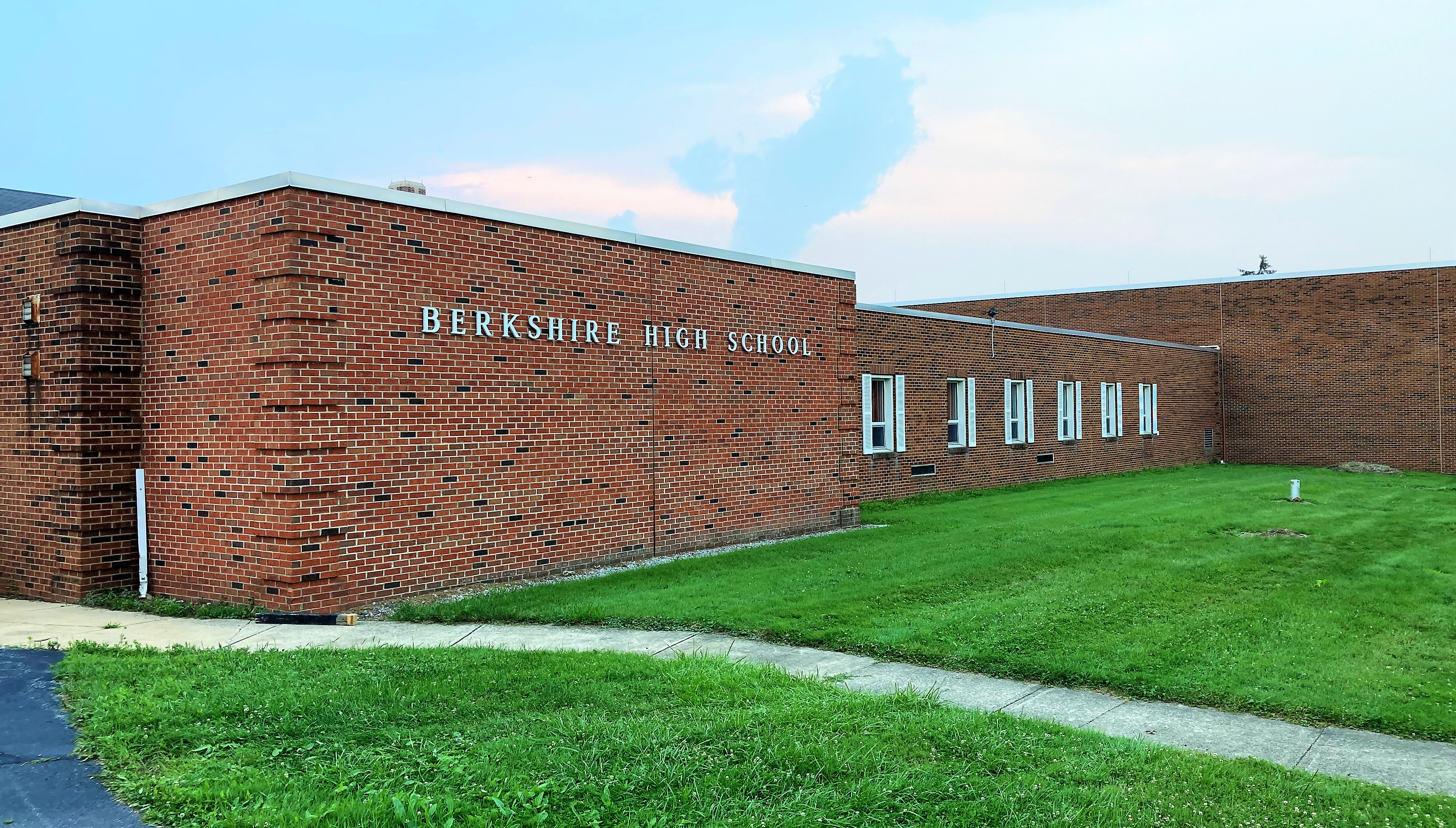
- Berkshire High School entrance

Address
- 14155 Claridon Troy Road Burton, Ohio, 44021; United States
- Coordinates: 41°29′02″N 81°8′13″W

District information
- Type: Public
- Grades: PK-12
- Established: 1967
- Superintendent: John Stoddard
- Accreditation: Ohio Department of Education
- NCES District ID: 3904716

Students and staff
- Enrollment: 1,372 (2024–25)
- Staff: 66.75 (FTE)
- Student–teacher ratio: 20.55
- District mascot: Badgers
- Colors: Purple & Gold

The Berkshire Local School District is a school district located in eastern Geauga County, Ohio. The district serves students in grades PreK through twelve in Burton, Claridon, Troy, Montville and Thompson townships. The district consists of one high school, one middle school, one elementary school and one preschool. All offices and buildings are located in Burton.

== History ==
The Berkshire Local School District was formed in 1967, with the consolidation of several smaller school districts in the areas of Burton, Claridon, and Troy. Berkshire High School was built in 1936, and Burton Elementary in 1959.

In 2015, following the closure of Ledgemont High School, the former high school underwent a territory transfer with the school district starting the 2015-16 school year

In 2022, the Berkshire School District has built its new campus on Claridon Troy Rd to house its all of its PK-12 students. The old high school building was sold in 2024, with it later becoming a film studio known as Schoolyard Studio

== Schools ==
=== High school ===
- Berkshire High School

=== Middle school ===
- Berkshire Middle School

=== Elementary school ===
- Berkshire Elementary School

=== Preschool ===
- Berkshire Early Learning Center

=== Former schools ===
Burton Elementary School
