= Notre Dame-Cathedral Latin School =

Private coeducational school in Chardon, Ohio, United States

Notre Dame-Cathedral Latin
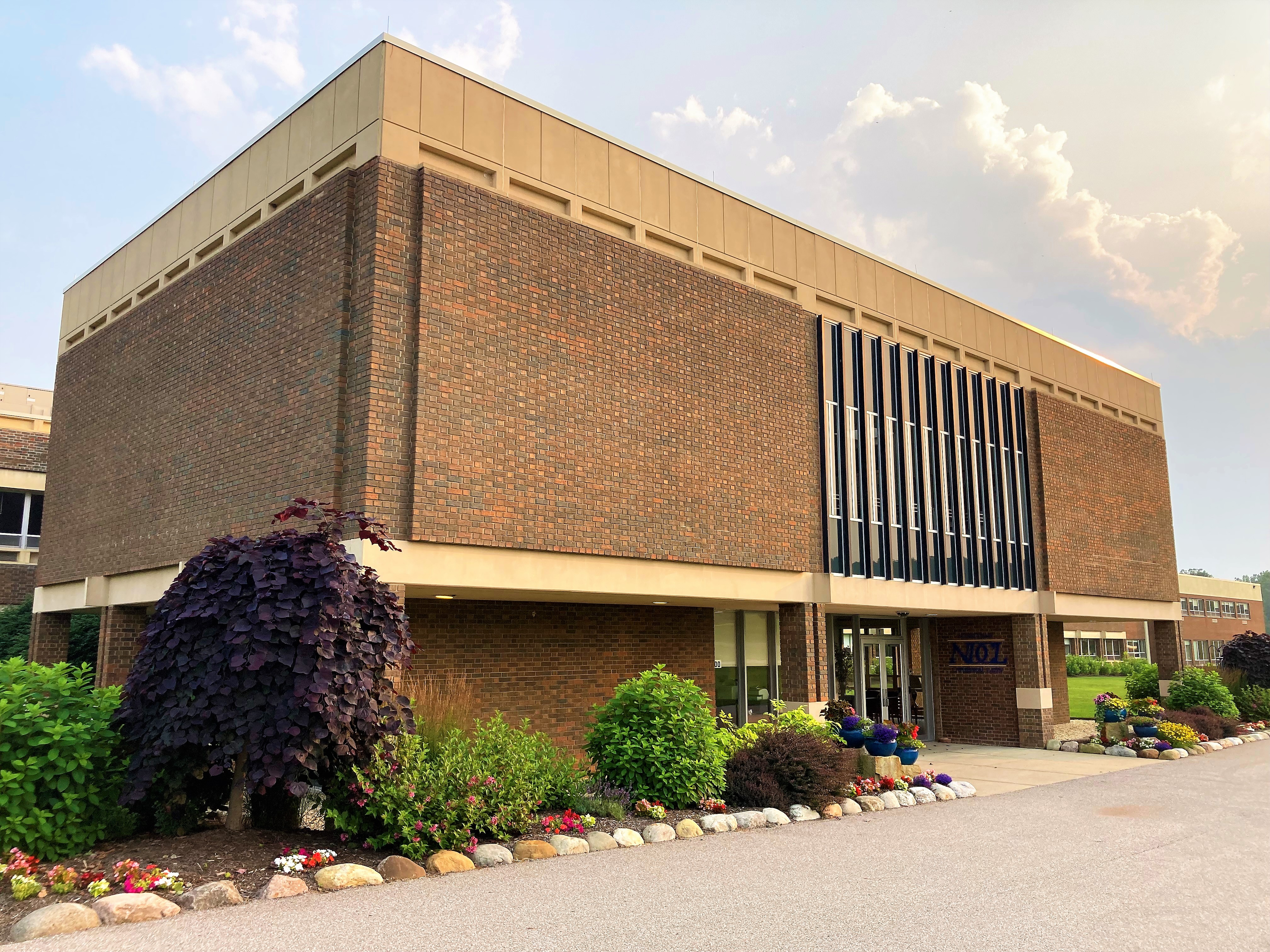

Location
- 13000 Auburn Road; Chardon, Ohio 44024; United States; 41°31′7″N 81°15′39″W

Information
- Type: Private
- Religious affiliation: Roman Catholic
- Patron saints: Mary, Mother of God
- Established: 1988
- Oversight: Sisters of Notre Dame
- President: Jacqueline Hoynes
- Principal: Chris Poulos
- Chaplain: James Caddy
- Faculty: 129
- Teaching staff: 78
- Grades: 9–12
- Gender: Coeducational
- Average class size: 20
- Student to teacher ratio: 13:1
- Education system: Canvas LLM & PowerSchool SIS
- Hours in school day: 7
- Campus: Munson TWP, Ohio
- Campus size: 75 acres (30 ha)
- Campus type: Suburban
- Colors: Blue and gold
- Slogan: "Transforming the world, as Jesus did, by living the truth in love."
- Athletics conference: North Coast Conference
- Sports: , Band, Color Guard, baseball, basketball, bowling, cheerleading, cross country,Girls Softball, football, golf, gymnastics, ice hockey, lacrosse, soccer, swimming, tennis, track and field, volleyball, wrestling
- Mascot: Tuffy the Lion
- Team name: Lions
- Rival: Lake Catholic High School
- Accreditation: Ohio Department of Education
- Publication: SEASONS
- Yearbook: CHRYSALIS
- Tuition: $18,550
- Website: ndcl.org

Notre Dame-Cathedral Latin is a coeducational, Catholic college-preparatory school in Chardon, Ohio, sponsored by the Sisters of Notre Dame.

== Background ==
The school began as Notre Dame Academy, an all-girls school founded in 1877. The school moved from Ansel Road in Cleveland, where it had been located for fifty years, to Chardon, Ohio in 1963. The campus sits on 75 acres of land.

Cathedral Latin School was established in 1916 by the Cleveland Diocese and Brothers of the Society of Mary (Marianists). By the late 1960s, Latin joined University Circle Inc. This college preparatory school for boys became renowned for its own scholastic excellence along with a storied sports history right up until its closing in 1979. The name was changed to Notre Dame-Cathedral Latin in 1988 when the school invited the Cathedral Latin Alumni Association to join in creating a new, coed school community on the NDA campus. Since the name change, the school is commonly referred to as NDCL. The school's athletic teams compete in the North Coast Conference. NDCL has developed a rivalry with Lake Catholic High School due to their geographic proximity in the east suburbs of Cleveland.

New tennis courts have been added to the campus in Chardon as a result of the Capital Campaign initiative. In addition, a completely renovated cafeteria, stadium lights, and technology improvements have also been added throughout the school. In the fall of 2011, the school announced plans to install a new all-purpose track and football turf in their stadium, Lions Stadium. Along with the track and turf, one of the school's gyms will be renovated to be a dedicated performing arts center. With the dedicated performing arts center, lost gym space will be made up by constructing a new gym connected to the school. All of this construction has been completed for the fall 2013 semester.

A new performing arts center has been named after Pat and Janet O'Brien after a contribution was received. The Pat and Janet O'Brien Center for the Performing Arts is now used for school plays and performances.

On June 19, 2014, a powerful storm with damaging winds tore a part of the main gym's roof off. Although the internal side of the roof was intact, an air conditioning unit tore off, causing heavy rain to flood the gym. In addition, a gas line was damaged, as well as the bleachers. After drying out the floor, it was determined that a new floor would be put in only in the main area (the area where basketball and volleyball are played at.) The bleachers were recovered and the gas line was fixed.

The restoration took nearly 6 months, with the girls' volleyball team (who won the OHSAA volleyball state championship) not playing a single game in their home gym.

NDCL has begun a new innovation center initiative by their SND Learning commons, with construction slated to begin after the last bell on May 21, 2026; this new innovation center of the school is scheduled to open when the 2026-27 school year begins this fall</ref>NDCL begins work on a new innovation center.

== Academics ==
NDCL offers classes in theology, business, English language, family and consumer sciences, physical education and health, mathematics, music, theatre, science, social studies, computer sciences, visual arts, and foreign languages (French and Spanish). NDCL has a 100% graduation rate with 99% of graduates attending four-year colleges and universities.

== Campus ==
The NDCL campus sits on 75 acres of land. The NDCL High School is made up of three separate buildings off the main one. Currently, the campus consists of one football stadium, two gyms, two baseball fields, two softball field, six tennis courts, two ponds, and four football-soccer practice fields. Notre Dame Elementary School is located nearby, "up the hill" from the high school building.

NDCL has two campus building projects: the Capstone Project, to construct a new performing arts auditorium and a new gym, as well as the Stadium Initiative, to lay new turf at the football stadium and replace the track around it. The Stadium Initiative was completed in August 2012 and the first game was played on August 24, 2012.

== Athletics ==
NDCL competes in Ohio High School Athletic Association (OHSAA).

NDCL competes in the North Coast Conference, which was formed in 2024. NDCL was previously a member of the Crown Conference from 1967 to 1979 (as Cathedral Latin), the North Coast League from 1991 to 2020, and the second iteration of the Crown Conference from 2021 to 2024.

=== Offered sports ===
Male	Female
Cross Country	Cross Country
Golf	Golf
Soccer	Soccer
Tennis	Tennis
Basketball	Basketball
Bowling	Bowling
Swimming	Swimming
Lacrosse	Lacrosse
Track and Field	Track and Field
Baseball	Softball
Esports	Esports
Football	-
Hockey	Hockey
Wrestling	-
-	Cheerleading
Volleyball	Volleyball
-	Gymnastics
-	Dance Team

=== Charity Game ===
On November 23, 1946, Cathedral Latin High School competed in the annual Charity Game, the Cleveland high school championship game, at Cleveland Municipal Stadium against Holy Name High School. The attendance of the game was local record crowd of 70,955 fans. It is the second-largest attendance for an American high school football game in history. Cathedral Latin defeated Holy Name, 35-6.

=== State championships ===
- Baseball - 2001, 2009
- Boys golf – 2000
- Girls golf – 2009
- Girls volleyball - 2014, 2015, 2022

==== Cathedral Latin ====
- Boys basketball - 1977

== Notable alumni ==
- Daniel Gaul, Cuyahoga County judge
- Matt Guerrieri, football coach
- Larry Kaminski, former NFL center for the Denver Broncos
- Coyote Peterson, YouTuber and wildlife educator
- Gianni Spetic, college football placekicker for the Texas Longhorns
