= North Coast Conference =

High school athletic conference in Ohio, US

- Association: OHSAA
- Founded: 2023
- Sports fielded: 10; men's: 10; women's: 9
- No. of teams: 8
- Region: Ohio

The North Coast Conference is an Ohio High School Athletic Association athletic conference and began play in the 2024–25 school year and consisted of members from Cuyahoga, Geauga, Lake, and Summit counties in Ohio.

== Members ==
School	Nickname	Location	Colors	Tenure	Notes
Beaumont School	Bluestreaks	Cleveland Hts.	Blue & White	2024–	Girls' sports only
Benedictine	Bengals	Cleveland	Columbia Blue & White	2025–	Boys' sports only. Benedictine joining league for football in 2027.
Cuyahoga Valley Christian Academy	Royals	Cuyahoga Falls	Blue & White	2024–	
Elyria Catholic	Panthers	Elyria	Green & White	2024–	
Holy Name	Green Wave	Parma Hts.	Green & White	2024–	
Lake Catholic	Cougars	Mentor	Forest Green & Gray	2024–	
Notre Dame-Cathedral Latin	Lions	Chardon	Blue & Gold	2024–	
Padua Franciscan	Bruins	Parma	Brown & White	2024–	

=== Future members ===
School	Nickname	Location	Colors	Tenure	Notes
Lutheran West	Longhorns	Rocky River	Red & White	2027–	joining from Chargin Valley Conference

== History ==
The North Coast Conference was established on May 31, 2023, by seven Cleveland-area high schools: Beaumont, Lake Catholic, Notre Dame-Cathedral Latin, and Padua Franciscan moved from the disbanding Crown Conference; Elyria Catholic and Holy Name moved from the Great Lakes Conference, and Cuyahoga Valley Christian Academy moved from the Principals Athletic Conference. All founding schools except CVCA were also members of the former North Coast League, which played from 1984 to 2020.

Benedictine announced in January 2025 that it would be joining the North Coast Conference for all sports except football effective the 2025-26 school year. Benedictine will not be joining for football until the 2027-28 school year. The move brings the conference to 8 overall members, with 7 of 8 schools competing in boys sports.

Lutheran West announced in May 2025 that it will join the North Coast Conference for all sports in 2027, moving from the Chagrin Valley Conference.
