= Elyria Catholic High School =

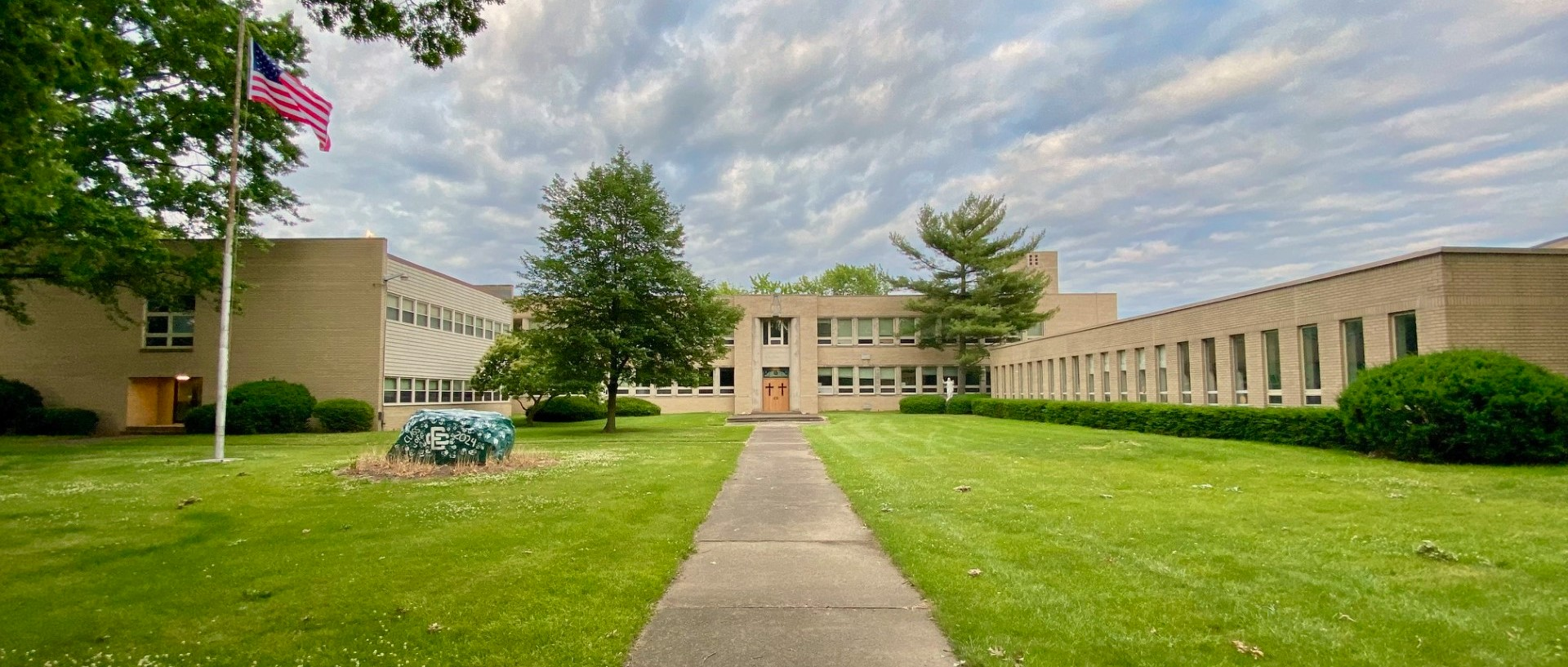

Location
- 725 Gulf Road; Elyria, Ohio 44035; United States; 41°22′57″N 82°5′36″W

Information
- School type: Private
- Religious affiliation: Roman Catholic
- Established: 1949
- Principal: Beth Adkins
- Chaplain: Father Deo
- Grades: 9–12
- Campus type: Suburban
- Colors: Green, white, black
- Slogan: It's a Great Day to be a Panther!
- Athletics conference: North Coast Conference
- Mascot: KC the Panter
- Team name: Panthers
- Accreditation: Ohio Catholic School Accrediting Association; Ohio Department of Education
- Newspaper: The Challenge
- Yearbook: ECHO
- Tuition: $11,500
- Affiliation: Diocese of Cleveland
- Website: elyriacatholic.com

Elyria Catholic High School (ECHS) is a private Catholic high school located in Elyria, Ohio, United States. It is affiliated with the Diocese of Cleveland and is the only Catholic high school in Lorain County. Elyria Catholic was built in 1949 and a physical education complex and economics lab was completed in 2007. The school colors are forest green, white, and black and athletic teams are known as the Panthers.

== Athletics ==
Elyria Catholic is a member of the Ohio High School Athletic Association (OHSAA) and has competed in the North Coast Conference since 2024.

Elyria Catholic was previously a member of the North Coast League (1985–2011), West Shore Conference (2011–2015), and Great Lakes Conference (2015–2024).

=== State championships ===
- Football – 1976, 1983, 1984
- Boys cross country – 1973, 1974, 1977, 1978

== Notable alumni ==
- Brianne McLaughlin - Class of 2005 - Named to the U.S. women's ice hockey team at the 2010 Winter Olympics.
- Branson Taylor - Class of 2020 - NFL offensive tackle for the Los Angeles Chargers
- Matt Wilhelm - Class of 1999 - professional football player in the National Football League (NFL)
