= Tre Tucker =

American football player (born 2001)

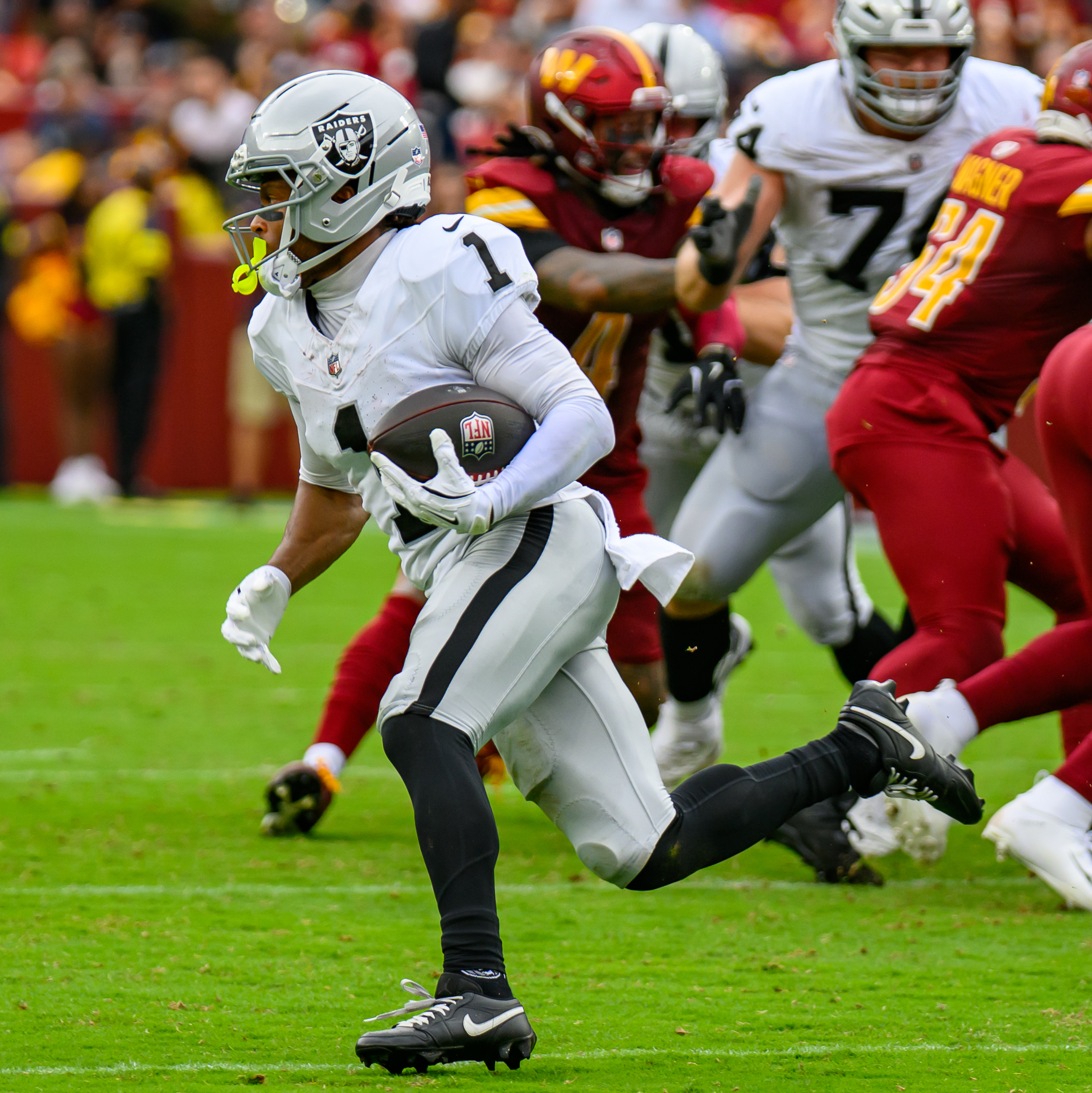
- Tucker with the Las Vegas Raiders in 2025

No. 1 – Las Vegas Raiders
- Positions: Wide receiver, return specialist
- Roster status: Active

Personal information
- Born: March 8, 2001 (age 25); Akron, Ohio, U.S.
- Listed height: 5 ft 8 in (1.73 m)
- Listed weight: 182 lb (83 kg)

Career information
- High school: Cuyahoga Valley Christian Academy (Cuyahoga Falls, Ohio)
- College: Cincinnati (2019–2022)
- NFL draft: 2023: 3rd round, 100th overall pick

Career history
- Las Vegas Raiders (2023–present)

Awards and highlights
- Second-team All-AAC (2020)

Career NFL statistics as of 2026
- Receptions: 123
- Receiving yards: 1,566
- Receiving touchdowns: 14
- Rushing yards: 172
- Rushing average: 5.7
- Rushing touchdowns: 1
- Return yards: 144
- Stats at Pro Football Reference

Tre'Monie "Tre" Tucker (born March 8, 2001) is an American professional football wide receiver and return specialist for the Las Vegas Raiders of the National Football League (NFL). He played college football for the Cincinnati Bearcats and was selected by the Raiders in the third round of the 2023 NFL draft.

== Early life ==
Tucker attended Cuyahoga Valley Christian Academy in Cuyahoga Falls, Ohio. He finished his high school career recording 2,288 rushing yards, 1,854 receiving yards, and 68 total touchdowns. Tucker was also a track and field star for CVCA, winning six Ohio High School Athletic Association state championships, including back-to-back titles in long jump and the 100-meter dash in 2018 and 2019. His other two titles came in the 4 x 200 m relay in 2018 and the 200 m in 2019. Tucker broke several records at CVCA in both football and track.

A three star recruit, he committed to play college football at the University of Cincinnati.

== College career ==
In Tucker's freshman season at the University of Cincinnati, he tallied seven receptions for 92 yards. The following season, Tucker would score his first career touchdown against Austin Peay. Tucker ended the season with three receiving touchdowns, while being named to the Second-team All-AAC as a kick returner. As a junior, Tucker caught 34 passes, for 426 yards, and two touchdowns. In Tucker's final season, he recorded 52 receptions, 672 yards, and three touchdowns. He would forgo playing in the 2022 Fenway Bowl and declared for the 2023 NFL draft. Tucker finished his collegiate career with 111 receptions for 1,425 yards, and eight touchdowns.

=== College statistics ===
Season	Games	Receiving				Rushing				Kick returns			
Season	GP	Rec	Yds	Avg	TD	Att	Yds	Avg	TD	Ret	Yds	Avg	TD
2019	14	7	92	13.1	0	8	93	11.6	0	23	532	23.1	0
2020	10	18	236	13.1	3	4	25	6.3	0	13	389	29.9	1
2021	14	34	426	12.5	2	2	12	6.0	0	22	557	25.3	1
2022	12	52	672	12.9	3	1	8	8.0	0	9	192	21.3	0
Career	50	111	1,425	12.8	8	15	138	9.2	0	67	1,670	24.9	2

== Professional career ==
Pre-draft measurables
Height	Weight	Arm length	Hand span	Wingspan	40-yard dash	10-yard split	20-yard split	20-yard shuttle	Three-cone drill	Vertical jump	Broad jump	Bench press
5 ft 8 5/8 in (1.74 m)	182 lb (83 kg)	28 7/8 in (0.73 m)	8 5/8 in (0.22 m)	5 ft 10 3/8 in (1.79 m)	4.39 s	1.56 s	2.46 s	4.49 s	7.07 s	37.5 in (0.95 m)	10 ft 4 in (3.15 m)	16 reps
All values from NFL Combine/Pro Day

Tucker was drafted by the Las Vegas Raiders in the third round, 100th overall, in the 2023 NFL Draft, in which, the Raiders previously acquired the pick from the New York Giants in a trade for Darren Waller. During the Week 15 Thursday Night Football win against the Los Angeles Chargers, Tucker connected with quarterback Aidan O’Connell for his first two receiving touchdowns as a professional. In his rookie season, he recorded 19 receptions for 331 yards and two touchdowns in 16 games and one start.

During the 2024 season, Tucker appeared in all 17 games (starting 14) for the Raiders, recording 47 receptions for 539 yards and three touchdowns.

Tucker began the 2025 season as one of Las Vegas' starting receivers. In Week 3 against the Washington Commanders, Tucker hauled in eight receptions for 145 yards and three touchdowns, all career-highs. In the 2025 season, he finished with 57 receptions for 696 yards and five touchdowns.

== NFL career statistics ==
=== Regular season ===
Year	Team	Games		Receiving					Rushing					Punt returns					Kick returns					Fumbles	
Year	Team	GP	GS	Rec	Yds	Avg	Lng	TD	Att	Yds	Avg	Lng	TD	Ret	Yds	Avg	Lng	TD	Ret	Yds	Avg	Lng	TD	Fum	Lost
2023	LV	16	1	19	331	17.4	1	2	10	77	7.7	34	0	0	0	0.0	0	0	0	0	0.0	0	0	0	0
2024	LV	17	14	47	539	11.5	58	3	9	44	4.9	11	1	8	72	9.0	21	0	0	0	0.0	0	0	0	0
2025	LV	17	17	57	696	12.2	61	5	11	51	4.6	10	0	7	49	7.0	15	0	1	23	23.0	23	0	0	0
Total		50	32	123	1,566	12.7	61	10	30	172	5.7	34	1	15	121	8.1	21	0	1	23	23.0	23	0	0	0
