= Tom Andrews (American football) =

American football player (born 1962)

Thomas Andrews
No. 60, 64
- Positions: Tackle, center

Personal information
- Born: January 11, 1962 (age 64); Parma, Ohio, U.S.
- Listed height: 6 ft 4 in (1.93 m)
- Listed weight: 265 lb (120 kg)

Career information
- High school: Padua Franciscan (Parma)
- College: Louisville
- NFL draft: 1984: 4th round, 98th overall pick

Career history
- Chicago Bears (1984–1985); Cleveland Browns (1987)*; Seattle Seahawks (1987)
- * Offseason or practice squad member only

Awards and highlights
- Super Bowl champion (XX)

Career NFL statistics
- Games played: 23
- Games started: 2
- Stats at Pro Football Reference

Thomas Edward Andrews (born January 11, 1962) is an American former professional football player who was an offensive tackle and center in the National Football League (NFL). He played college football for the Louisville Cardinals and was selected by the Chicago Bears in the fourth round of the 1984 NFL draft with the 98th overall pick. He played three seasons in the NFL, two for the Bears (1984–1985) and one for the Seattle Seahawks (1987). He was a member of the 1985 Bears Super Bowl XX winning team.

Andrews is currently the senior director of development for Papa John's Pizza.
