= Padua Franciscan High School =

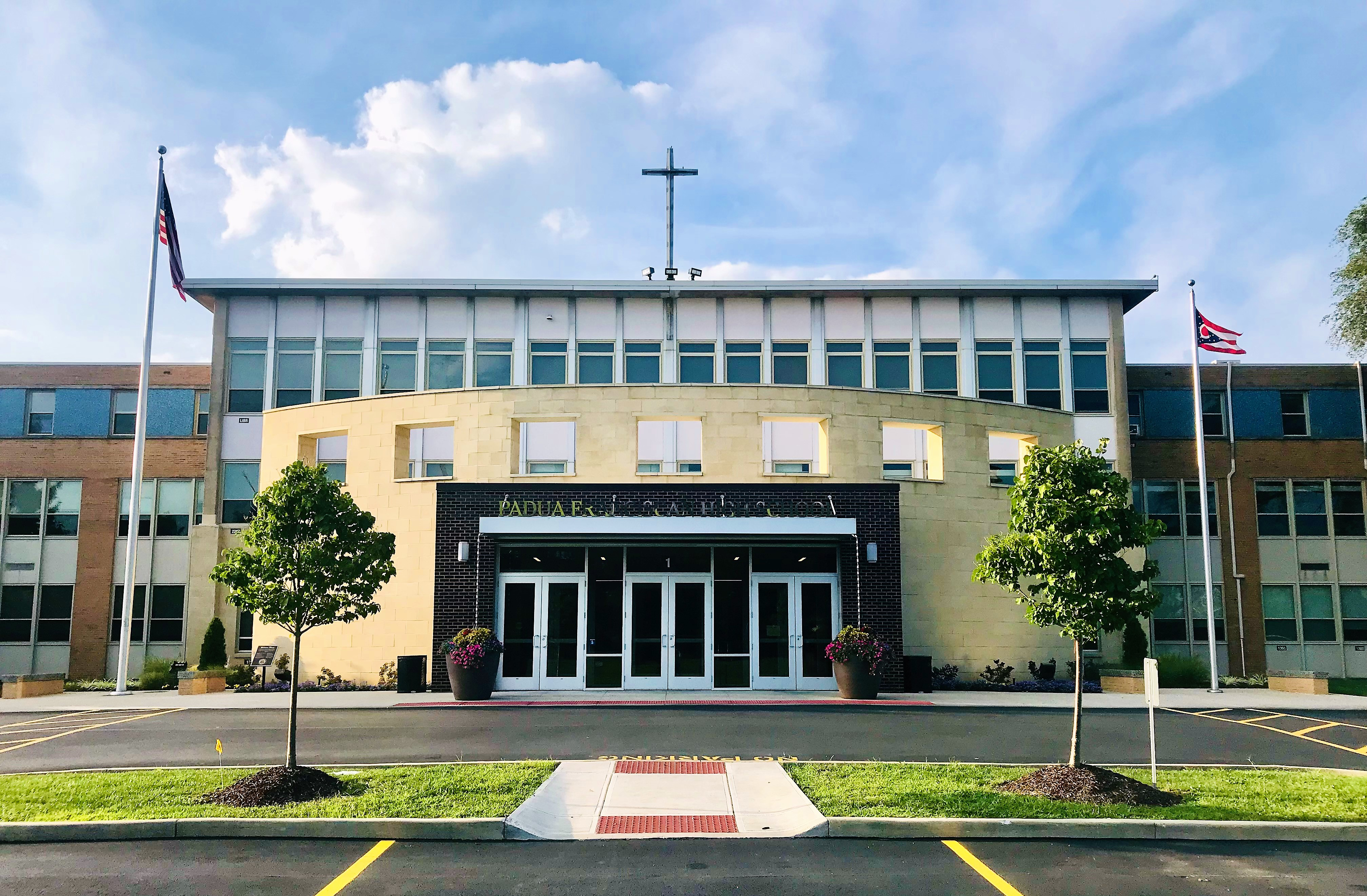

Location
- 6740 State Road; Parma, (Cuyahoga County), Ohio 44134; United States; 41°22′49″N 81°42′52″W

Information
- Type: Private college-preparatory school
- Motto: In Sanctitate Et Doctrina (In Holiness and Learning)
- Religious affiliations: Roman Catholic; Franciscan
- Patron saint: St. Anthony of Padua
- Established: 1961; 65 years ago
- President: David Stec
- Principal: Robert DiRocco
- Teaching staff: 54.3 (on an FTE basis)
- Grades: 9–12
- Gender: Co-educational
- Enrollment: 764 (2022–23)
- Student to teacher ratio: 13.7
- Campus: Suburban
- Colors: Brown and white with orange accent
- Team name: Bruins
- Accreditation: North Central Association of Colleges and Schools; Ohio Catholic School Accrediting Association
- Yearbook: Patavium
- Tuition: $16,100
- Affiliation: National Catholic Educational Association01059213
- Website: www.paduafranciscan.com

Padua Franciscan High School is a private co-educational Franciscan college-preparatory school in Parma, Ohio, United States. It is within the Roman Catholic Diocese of Cleveland.

== History ==
Founded in 1961 as a private school for boys, Padua Franciscan became co-educational in 1983 and is the largest co-ed private school in northeast Ohio.

== School year ==
The school year is made up of two 90-day semesters which are subdivided into four 9-week grading quarters. A typical school day consists of eight 41-minute periods and a 26-minute lunch.

Padua offers remedial, basic, regular, honors, and Advanced Placement (AP) courses in a variety of subjects. To graduate from Padua, each student must complete a core curriculum of 24 credits over the four years. Along with this, every student is required to complete a yearly Service Learning Requirement that differs according to grade level.

Padua has a MedTrack program to educate students who are interested in a career in science and medicine. Padua has the following MyTrack Programs: Business, Computer Science, Engineering, Fine Arts, and Law.

== Athletics ==
Padua competes in Ohio High School Athletic Association (OHSAA). The school competes in the North Coast Conference, which was formed in 2024. It was previously a member of the Crown Conference from 1967 to 1980, the North Coast League from 1984 to 2020, and the second iteration of the Crown Conference from 2021 to 2024.

Boys' sports are tennis, cross country, football, golf, soccer, basketball, hockey, swimming, wrestling, baseball, lacrosse, track & field, figure skating, and bowling.

Girls' sports are cross country, golf, soccer, tennis, volleyball, basketball, swimming, softball, track & field, figure skating, gymnastics, cheerleading, bowling, and lacrosse.

=== Ohio High School Athletic Association State Championships ===
- Hockey - 1988, 1989, 2006
- Volleyball - 2008, 2009, 2013, 2016, 2017

== Notable alumni ==
- Tom Andrews – collegiate/professional football player
- Andrew Carmellini – chef and restaurateur in New York City; earned a Michelin Star, James Beard Award nominee
- Sean Faris – actor, most notable for playing Jake Tyler in Never Back Down
- Dan Fritsche – former NHL player
- Brian Holzinger – retired NHL player
- Reggie Lee – actor, most notable for playing Sergeant Drew Wu on Grimm
- Josh Robert Thompson – actor and comedian
