= Larry Kaminski =

American football player (born 1945)

No. 59
- Position: Center

Personal information
- Born: January 6, 1945 (age 81); Cleveland, Ohio, U.S.
- Listed height: 6 ft 2 in (1.88 m)
- Listed weight: 245 lb (111 kg)

Career information
- High school: Cathedral Latin (Chardon, Ohio)
- College: Purdue
- NFL draft: 1966: undrafted

Career history
- Denver Broncos (1966–1973)

Awards and highlights
- AFL All-Star (1967); First-team All-Big Ten (1965)

Career NFL statistics
- Games played: 96
- Stats at Pro Football Reference

Larry Michael Kaminski (born January 6, 1945) is an American former professional football player who was a center for the Denver Broncos of the American Football League (AFL) and National Football League (NFL). He played college football for the Purdue Boilermakers.

== Early life ==
Of Polish descent, Kaminski is originally from Cleveland, Ohio, where he attended Cathedral Latin High School. As captain of the Lions, he helped lead the team to win the East Senate title and compete in the City Championship- Charity Game. Following his senior year he made numerous honors to include All-Ohio, High School All-American, and played in the Ohio All Star game in Canton, Ohio.

== College career ==
Purdue awarded Kaminski a scholarship to attend the Big Ten University. Larry played all three varsity seasons as both a center and linebacker. He was Captain of the freshman team. The Purdue teams coached by Jack Mollenkopf led by Hall of Famer Bob Griese beat Notre Dame and was ranked in the top 10 his senior year. Larry earned first-team All Big Ten honors and honorable mention All American. After the season ended he was invited to play in the Blue-Gray Game in Montgomery, Alabama where he started the game at center.

He graduated in 1966 with a BS Industrial Management. (Economics and Marketing).

== Professional career ==
After graduation, Kaminski was preparing for a business career when the Denver Broncos asked to sign him as a free agent. He jumped on the opportunity and went to the weight room to beef up to 235 pounds. He made the Broncos roster and started at center for 13 games. After the season, he was mentioned for Rookie of the Year honorable mention. Kaminski's career lasted from 1966 to 1973. He experienced being a member of the first winning year for the Denver franchise. He also played in the first two wins the AFL had over the venerable NFL when the Broncos beat the Detroit Lions and Minnesota Vikings. He was voted to be a member of the All-AFL Team in 1967 and played in the All Star game in Jacksonville, Florida. Being very active in the Denver community, he was nominated for NFL Man of the Year Honors in 1972 and 1973. Larry was a game captain several times in his tenure with the team. After a series of injuries, he decided to retire in 1974.

== Life after football ==
After retirement, Larry Kaminski was awarded an Anheuser Busch franchise in Ski Town USA, Steamboat Springs, CO. He and former Nebraska great, Walt Barnes worked the business for several years. Walt sold out and Larry recruited his two sons to learn the business. Kaminski became active in the Steamboat community.

Kaminski was one of the original inductees of the Denver Bronco Alumni Association Board of Directors. He and Jerry Sturm and Gene Mingo were the only players from the original Denver AFL franchise. (see www.remembertheAFL.com)

Kaminski was the founding member of the Jack Mollenkopf Society to honor his former coach.

Kaminski has recently been placed as a nominee for center on the Denver Bronco All 50 year Team. In 2019 the Denver Bronco fans elected him as one of the top 100 players on the Bronco franchise.

== See also ==
- Other American Football League players
