= Holy Name High School =

Private Catholic school in Parma Heights, Ohio, US

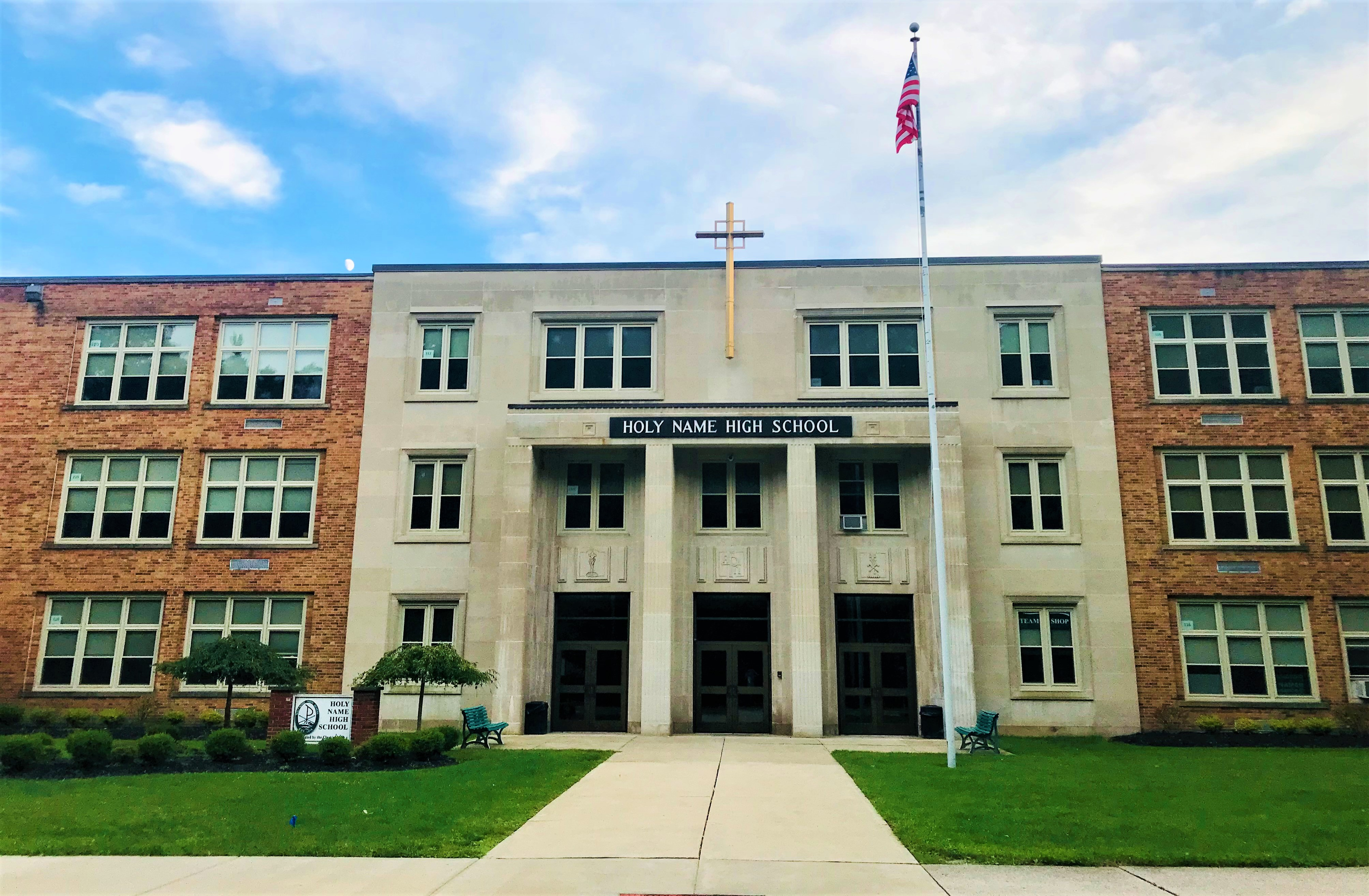

Location
- 6000 Queens Highway; Parma Heights, (Cuyahoga County), Ohio 44130; United States; 41°24′8″N 81°45′42″W

Information
- Type: Private co-educational
- Motto: The School's The Thing
- Religious affiliation: Roman Catholic
- Established: 1914
- Principal: Molly Krist
- Grades: 9–12
- Enrollment: 650 (2019)
- Average class size: 22
- Student to teacher ratio: 15:1
- Campus: Suburban
- Colors: Green and white
- Athletics conference: North Coast Conference
- Nickname: Green Wave, Little Davids, Namers
- Tuition: $11,600
- Website: holynamehs.com

Holy Name High School (HNHS) is a private, Catholic, co-educational high school in Parma Heights, Ohio, US. It is a part of the Roman Catholic Diocese of Cleveland.

== History ==
Founded in 1914, Holy Name was the first Catholic high school in the Cleveland area to enroll both male and female students. The school was originally located on Harvard and Broadway in Cleveland, but in 1977, it moved to Queens Highway in Parma Heights, Ohio, to accommodate its growing enrollment. The move included taking over the all-female Nazareth Academy, which was run by the Congregation of the Sisters of St. Joseph.

=== Motto ===
The school's present motto was adopted in 1926, when "The School's The Thing" appeared in the yearbook. The article that accompanied the motto was purposeful in its insistence that personal glory in any field of school activity means very little.

=== Seal ===
The Chi Rho incorporates the first two letters of the name of Christ in Greek characters XP. The Holy Name High School seal consists of the Chi Rho encircled by the school's identification. This symbol now resides on the far wall of the new gym. The gift was donated by the Class of 2006.

=== Mascot ===
Holy Name's mascot, the Green Wave, originated in the early 1920s when it was first used to describe the perfect coordination of the Holy Name American football team, which gave the appearance of a giant green wave engulfing opponents. They are also commonly called the "Little Davids", in reference to David and Goliath, because of efforts in defeating larger schools, who were considered large favorites.

=== Charity game ===
On November 23, 1946, Holy Name High School competed in the annual Charity Game, the Cleveland high school championship game, at Cleveland Municipal Stadium against Cathedral Latin High School (now Notre Dame-Cathedral Latin). The attendance at the game was a local record crowd of 70,955. It is the second-largest attendance for an American high school football game in history. Holy Name was defeated by Cathedral Latin, 35–6.

In 1961, Frank Solich led the Holy Name squad and defeated Cathedral Latin 12–7 to win the Charity Game. Solich ran for 184 yards and two scores in the game in front of 29,918.

== Athletics ==
Holy Name competes in Ohio High School Athletic Association (OHSAA).

Holy Name competes in the North Coast Conference, which was formed in 2024. Holy Name was previously a member of the North Coast League from 1984 to 2015 and the Great Lakes Conference from 2015 to 2024.

=== Ohio High School Athletic Association State Championships ===
- Football – 1975
- Baseball – 1981
- Girls' Soccer – 2006
- Volleyball – 2018

== Notable alumni ==
- John Banaszak, former NFL player
- Chris Broussard, sports journalist, contributor to ESPN, New York Times and TrueHoop. Currently works for Fox Sports.
- Bob Ptacek, football player at University of Michigan and for Cleveland Browns, also an All-Star in Canadian Football League
- Frank Solich, head football coach at Nebraska and Ohio
- Ashley Sebera, fitness competitor, model, bodybuilder, and professional wrestler, competing under ring name Dana Brooke
- Mark Termini, Hall of Fame basketball player at Holy Name (1974) and Case Western Reserve University (1978); noted sports attorney and NBA agent/contract negotiator
