= Beaumont School (Ohio) =

Location
- 3301 North Park Blvd; Cleveland Heights, (Cuyahoga County), Ohio 44118; United States; 41°29′8″N 81°33′42″W

Information
- Type: Private
- Motto: Educating Young Women Who Will Change the World
- Religious affiliation: Roman Catholic
- Established: 1850; 176 years ago
- Founder: The Ursuline Sisters of Cleveland
- Sister school: Benedictine High School (Brother School Benedictine is all males)
- Oversight: Ursuline Sisters
- President: Wendy Hoke
- Principal: Ann Hoezel
- Grades: 9–12
- Gender: Female
- Enrollment: 318
- Average class size: 18
- Hours in school day: 8:15am-3:05pm
- Campus size: 21 acres (85,000 m^{2})
- Colors: Blue and Gold
- Slogan: "A Catholic school in the Ursuline tradition educating women for life, leadership, and service."
- Song: Beautiful Beaumont
- Athletics: 10 athletic teams including soccer, cross country, basketball, lacrosse, swimming, volleyball, tennis, softball, track and golf
- Mascot: Bluestreak
- Team name: Blue Streaks
- Accreditation: North Central Association of Colleges and Schools
- Newspaper: Beaumonster
- School fees: included
- Tuition: $17,215
- Alumni: Emily Infeld and Kathryn Hahn
- Website: www.beaumontschool.org

Beaumont School is a private, all-girls, International Baccalaureate, Catholic school located in Cleveland Heights, Ohio, United States. It is accredited by the Ohio Department of Education, the North Central Association of Secondary Schools and Colleges, and the Ohio Catholic School Accrediting Association. It is a part of the Roman Catholic Diocese of Cleveland.

== History ==
While Beaumont has existed since 1942 at its current location, the former 21-acre estate of famed banker Kenyon Painter, it traces its origin to 1850, making it the oldest school in the Cleveland Diocese and the oldest secondary school in Cleveland. It continues to operate under the original Ohio state charter granted in 1854 to the Ursuline Sisters for the education of young women. The current location sits adjacent to the 279-acre Shaker Lakes parklands, a designated National Environmental Education Landmark. When the school relocated to Cleveland Heights in September 1942, it was named in honor of the first Ursuline superior, Mother Mary of the Annunciation Beaumont.

In January 2003, the Board of Directors of Beaumont School approved the construction of a new $5 million Spiritual Life Center destined to be the hub of student spiritual, academic and social activities and the first major addition to the campus since 1964. The new Spiritual Life Center opened on April 22, 2004. As the growth in STEM education expanded, Beaumont Board of Directors approved construction of a $9.5 million STEM addition with eight science labs/classrooms, Pre-Engineering Lab/Maker Space, student commons and administrative offices. The building opened in January 2015. In August 2017, Beaumont School became the only all-girls school in Cleveland to offer the rigorous International Baccalaureate Diploma Programme.

College guidance is a primary academic goal to ensure students get admitted to, and are successful at, the university of their choosing. In 2018 alone, Beaumont graduates earned $12.6 million in merit-based scholarships. Beaumont has continually emphasized college preparation in a single-sex Catholic setting, with almost all of the students (about 20% of whom are non-Catholic) going on to college.

Beaumont athletics offers opportunities to be on Blue Streaks sports teams for 11 different sports.

== Athletics ==
The Beaumont Bluestreaks compete in the Ohio High School Athletic Association (OHSAA) and have competed in the North Coast Conference since 2024. Beaumont previously competed in the North Coast League from 2011-2020 and the Crown Conference from 2021-2024.

=== Ohio High School Athletic Association state championships ===
Beaumont has won the most Girls' Track & Field team state championships in the history of the Ohio High School Athletic Association from any all-girls high school.

- Girls Cross Country - 1993, 1994, 1995, 1996, 1999, 2000, 2001
- Girls Track and Field - 1986, 1987, 1988, 1989, 1990, 1991, 1992, 1994, 1996, 1997, 1998, 1999, 2001, 2002, 2007, 2008
- Girls Volleyball - 2012
