= Vermilion High School =

Public, coeducational high school in Vermilion, Ohio, United States

- VHS

Location
- 1250 Sanford Street; Vermilion, (Erie County)(students from Lorain county also), Ohio 44089; United States; 41°24′40″N 82°21′27″W

Information
- Type: Public, Coeducational high school
- Superintendent: Wes Weaver
- Principal: Andrew Perry
- Staff: 33 (on an FTE basis)
- Grades: 8-12
- Enrollment: 674 (2022-23)
- Student to teacher ratio: 20.42
- Colors: Purple and Gold
- Athletics conference: Northern Ohio Conference
- Sports: boys soccer, girls soccer, boys tennis, girls tennis, girls volleyball, football, cross country, girls track, boys track, girls basketball, boys basketball, baseball, softball, bowling, cheerleading, marching band
- Team name: Sailors
- Rival: Firelands Falcons
- Accreditation: North Central Association of Colleges and Schools
- Website: Vermilion High School

Vermilion High School is a public high school in Vermilion, Ohio. It is the only high school in the Vermilion Local School District.

The school colors are purple and gold. The sports teams are nicknamed the Sailors. The rivalry game between the Sailors and their arch rivals, the Firelands Falcons, is by far the most important game of the year for both teams. The principal is Mr. Andrew Perry.

== Notable alumni ==
- Allie LaForce, 2005 Miss Teen USA and sports reporter for CBS
- Andy Oliver, Baseball pitcher
