= Berkshire High School (Burton, Ohio) =

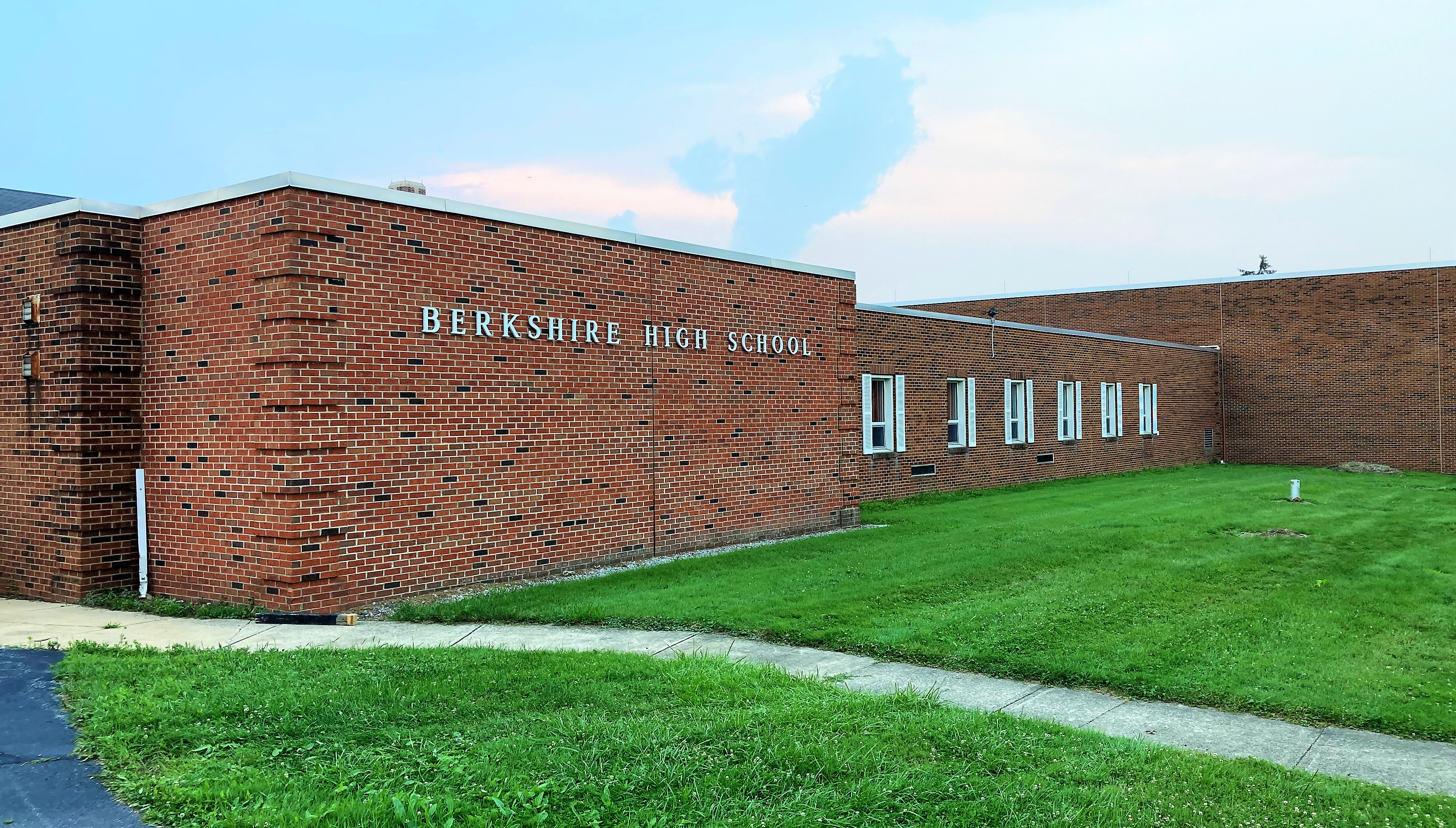

Location
- 14155 Claridon Troy Rd; Burton, Ohio 44021; United States
- Coordinates: 41°29′02″N 81°8′13″W

Information
- Type: Public, Coeducational high school
- Opened: 1936
- School district: Berkshire Local School District
- Superintendent: John Stoddard
- Dean: Brian Hiscox
- Principal: Jon Franks
- Teaching staff: 19.90 (FTE)
- Grades: 7-12
- Average class size: 100
- Student to teacher ratio: 22.36
- Colors: Purple & Gold
- Athletics conference: Chagrin Valley Conference
- Team name: Badgers
- Website: www.berkshireschools.org

Berkshire High School is a public high school in Burton, Ohio It is the only high school in the Berkshire Local School District. Their nickname is the Badgers, and they compete in the Chagrin Valley Conference as a member of the Ohio High School Athletic Association.

== History ==
Opened in 1936 Berkshire High School serves students grades 9-12.

Berkshire High School was previously known as Burton High School before consolidating with neighboring districts to form Berkshire High School.

In 2015, following the closure of Ledgemont High School, the former high school underwent a territory transfer with the school district starting the 2015-16 school year

In 2022, the Berkshire School District has built its new campus on Claridon Troy Rd to house its all of its PK-12 students. The old high school building was sold in 2024, with it later becoming a film studio known as Schoolyard Studio

== Athletics ==
Berkshire High School currently offers:

- Baseball
- Basketball
- Bowling
- Cheerleading
- Cross Country
- Golf
- Football
- Softball
- Track and field
- Volleyball
- Wrestling

== Notable alumni ==
- Dan Taylor, shot put, 2009 indoor national champion (Class of 2000)
