= Valley Christian Schools (Ohio) =

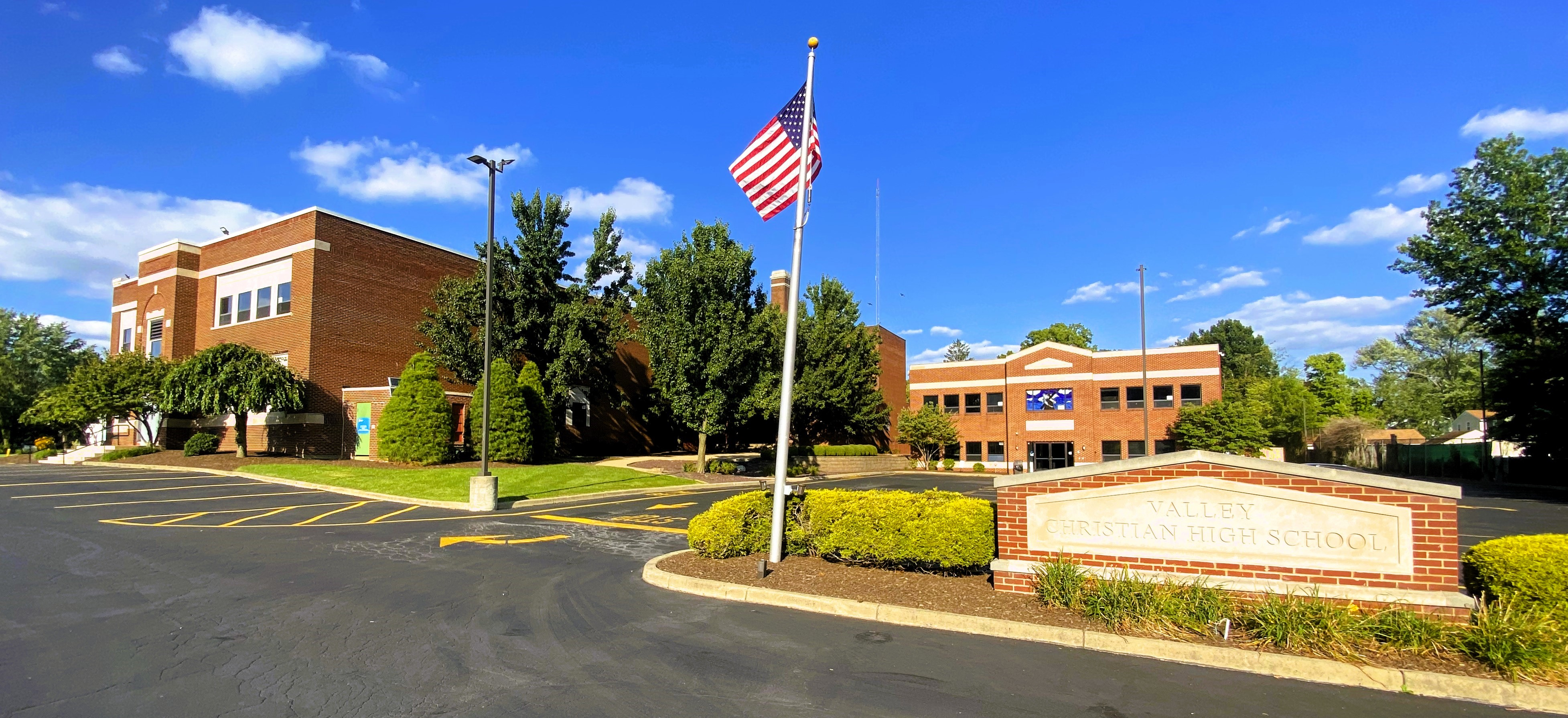

Location
- 4401 Southern Boulevard; Youngstown, Ohio 44512; United States; 41.053704°N 80.656434°W

Information
- Motto: Love More, Expect More, Be More
- President: Michael Pecchia
- Principal: Melissa Watson
- Grades: PK-12
- Colors: Royal blue and gold
- Athletics conference: Eastern Ohio Athletic Conference
- Team name: Eagles
- Website: valleychristianschools.net

Valley Christian School is a private Christian school located in Youngstown, Ohio. It is the only school in the Valley Christian School District. Athletic teams are known as the Eagles, and they compete as a member of the Ohio High School Athletic Association in the Eastern Ohio Athletic Conference. It is affiliated with the Assemblies of God.

== History ==
Valley Christian Schools, opened in 1975. In its current campus houses students grades K-12

Youngstown Christian was renamed Valley Christian in 2015 to better represent their geographic reach.

In 2025, the City of Youngstown approved a sale to Valley Christian of the old South fieldhouse and stadium to construct its Valley Legends Stadium
