= Cuyahoga Valley Christian Academy =

Private school in Cuyahoga Falls, Ohio

Coordinates: 41°11′47″N 81°29′34″W

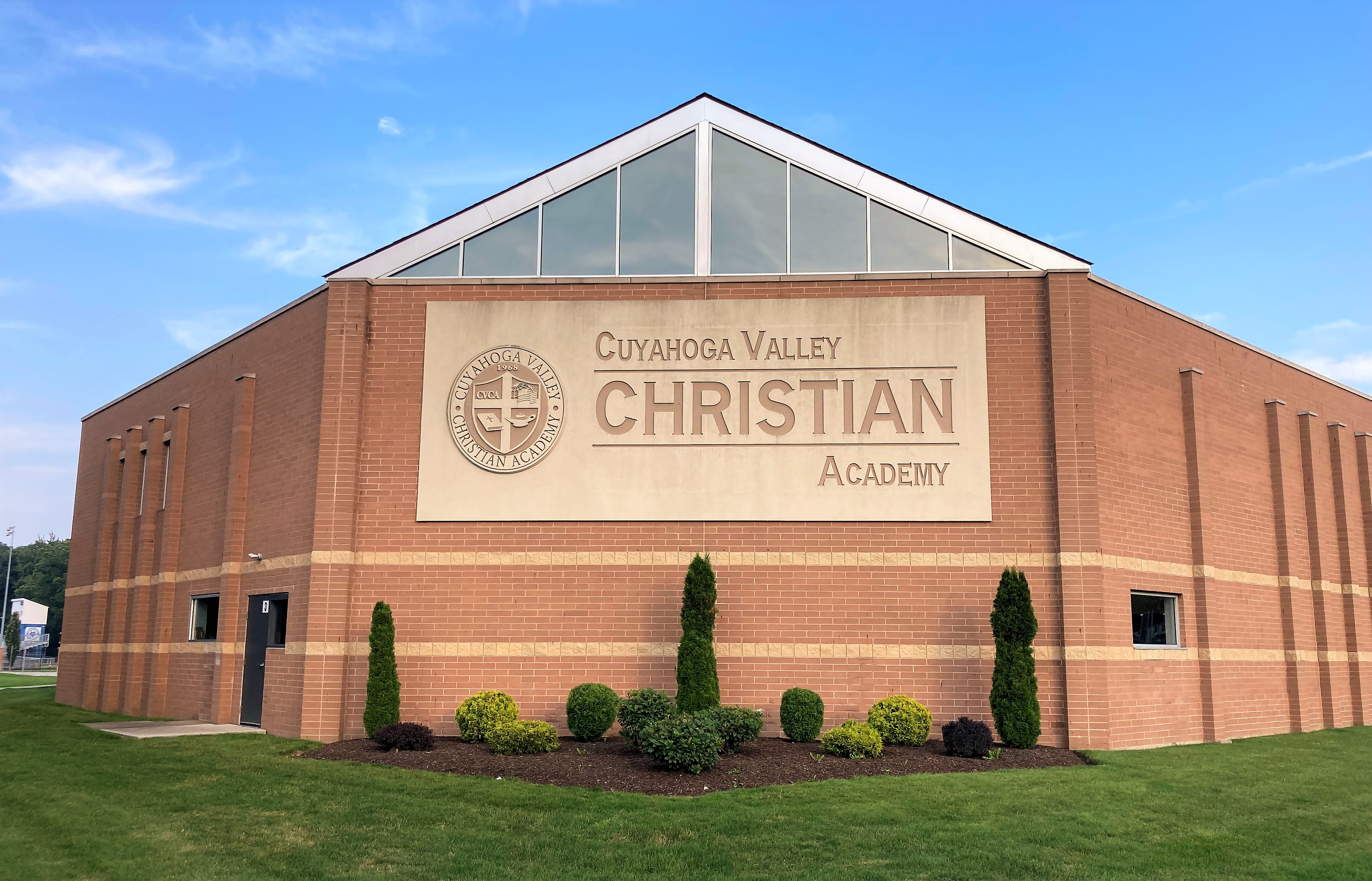

Location
- 4687 Wyoga Lake Road; Cuyahoga Falls, Summit County, Ohio 44224; United States

Information
- Type: Private
- Motto: Cultivating and Educating Servants for Christ
- Established: 1968
- President: Jason Spodnik
- Dean: Eric Ling
- High school principal: Laura Chadima
- Middle school principal: Sarah Telepak
- Headmaster: Matt Koons
- Grades: 6–12
- Enrollment: 1,231 (2025–26)
- Colors: Royal blue, white, and black
- Athletics conference: North Coast Conference
- Mascot: Royal
- Publication: The Royal Weekly
- Website: cvcaroyals.org

Cuyahoga Valley Christian Academy (CVCA), founded in 1968, is a private, college-preparatory, nondenominational Christian middle school and high school in Cuyahoga Falls, Ohio, United States, serving 1,231 students in grades 6–12.

== Academic support ==
CVCA offers academic support through its Office of Academic Success and Instructional Services (OASIS).

== Student activity ==
Co-curricular activities complement the CVCA curriculum by developing interests outside of scholastic achievement. These include Academic Challenge, art club, Diakonos (service club), nail polish club, ping pong club, Royal Fools Improv, ski club, Talking Royals Speech and Debate, ultimate frisbee club, and urban agriculture club.

== Athletics ==
CVCA competes in the Ohio High School Athletic Association and the North Coast Conference.

=== Sports sponsored ===
CVCA offers 26 total sports (13 men's, 13 women's) across 3 different seasons.

Men's sports	Women's sports
Baseball	Basketball
Basketball	Bowling
Bowling	Cheerleading
Cross country	Cross country
Football	Flag football
Golf	Golf
Ice hockey	Lacrosse
Lacrosse	Soccer
Soccer	Softball
Swimming and diving	Swimming and diving
Tennis	Tennis
Track and field	Track and field
Wrestling	Volleyball

=== State championships ===
- Boys soccer – 2004, 2007, 2010
- Girls track and field – 2008, 2009
- Girls cross country – 2008
- Boys track and field – 2018

== Notable alumni ==
- Justin Lester – member of the 2012 USA Olympic Wrestling Team, two-time bronze medalist in world wrestling championships
- Darryn Peterson – professional basketball player in National Basketball Association for the Utah Jazz
- Ben Speas – professional soccer player in Major League Soccer (MLS)
- Nathan Tomasello – 2015 NCAA Division I Wrestling champion, four-time NCAA All-American, four-time Big Ten Conference Wrestling Champion
- Tre Tucker – professional football player in the National Football League (NFL)
- Ben Zemanski – professional soccer player in MLS
