= Lake Catholic High School =

Private coeducational school in Mentor, Ohio, United States

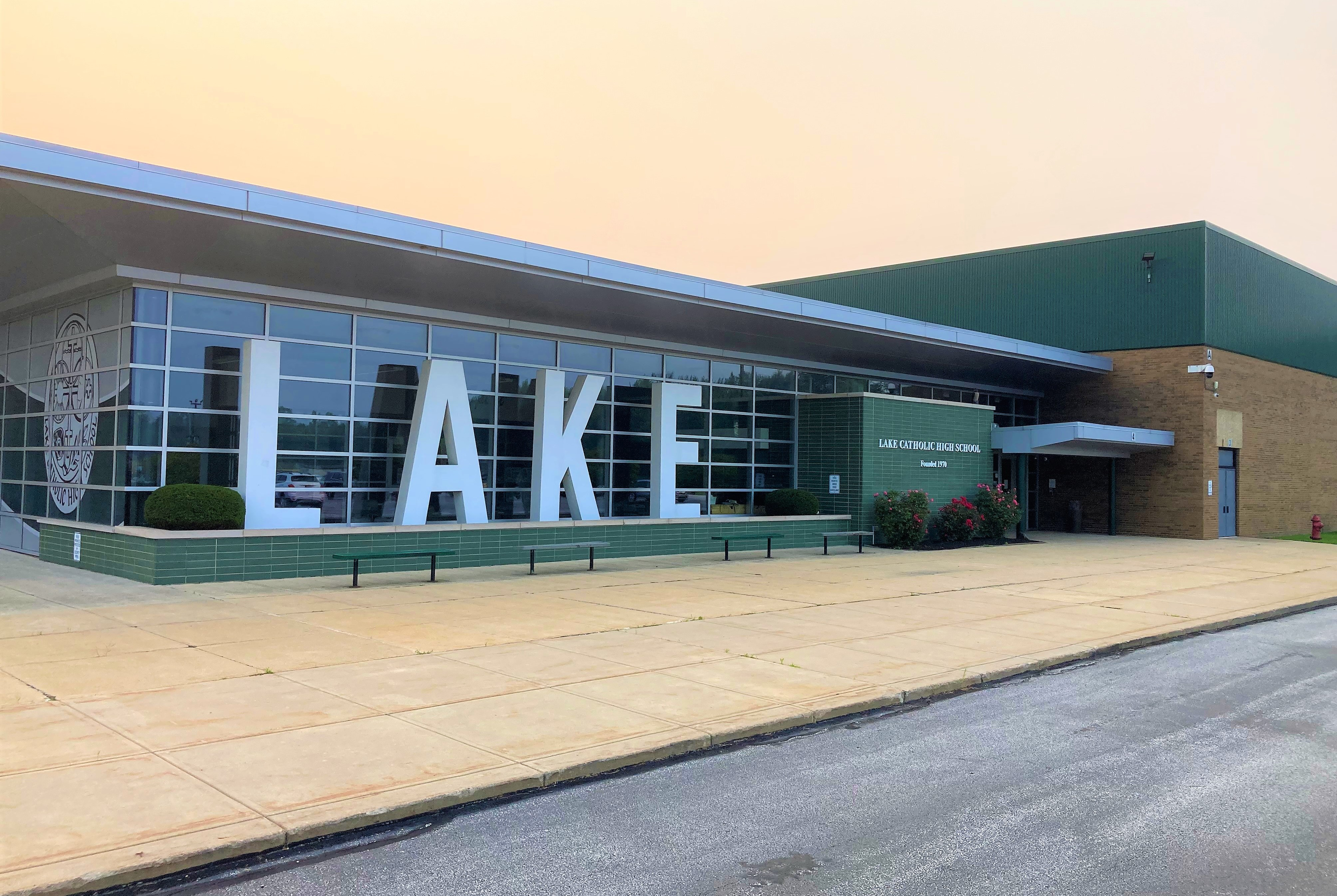

Location
- 6733 Reynolds Road; Mentor, Ohio 44060; United States; 41°41′17″N 81°22′34″W

Information
- Type: Private, Coeducational
- Motto: Creating Extraordinary Futures
- Religious affiliation: Catholic
- Patron saint: St. Thomas Aquinas
- Established: 1970
- Oversight: Diocese of Cleveland
- President: John Morabeto
- Principal: Tom McKrill
- Teaching staff: 34.0 (on an FTE basis)
- Grades: 9–12
- Enrollment: 506 (2019–20)
- Student to teacher ratio: 14.9
- Campus: Suburban
- Colors: Green and gray
- Athletics conference: North Coast Conference
- Nickname: Cougars
- Rival: Notre Dame-Cathedral Latin High School
- Newspaper: The Lakeline
- Yearbook: The Torch
- Website: www.lakecatholic.org

Lake Catholic High School is a private Catholic secondary school in Mentor, Ohio, United States. It is affiliated with the Diocese of Cleveland.

== Demographics ==
The demographic breakdown of the 506 students enrolled for 2019-20 was:

- Native American/Alaskan - 0.2%
- Asian - 1.2%
- Black - 4.5%
- Hispanic - 3.0%
- White - 86.4%
- Native Hawaiian/Pacific islanders - 0.2%
- Multiracial -4.5%

== Athletics ==
Lake Catholic competes in Ohio High School Athletic Association (OHSAA).

Lake Catholic competes in the North Coast Conference, which was formed in 2024. Lake Catholic was previously a member of the Crown Conference from 1970 to 1980, the North Coast League from 1984 to 2020, and the second iteration of the Crown Conference from 2021 to 2024.

=== Sports offered ===
sanctioned sports are offered:

- Baseball (boys)
  - State champion – 2025
- Basketball (girls and boys)
- Bowling (boys)
- Cross country (girls and boys)
- Football (boys)
  - State champion – 1991,1992, 2001
- Golf (girls and boys)
- Gymnastics (girls)
- Lacrosse (girls)
- Soccer (girls and boys)
- Softball (girls)
- Swimming and diving (girls and boys)
- Tennis (girls and boys)
- Track and field (girls and boys)
- Volleyball (girls)
  - State champion - 2010, 2022, 2023, 2024, 2025
- Wrestling (boys)
  - State champion - 1989

== Notable alumni ==
- Evan Bush; Major League Soccer (MLS) goalkeeper
- Joe Jurevicius; National Football League (NFL) wide receiver
- Ben Kelly; NFL cornerback
- Eric Kettani; NFL fullback
- Matt Ludwig; Olympic pole vaulter
- Ricky Stanzi; NFL and Canadian Football League (CFL) quarterback
