= Ledgemont High School =

Location
- 16700 Thompson Road; Thompson, Geauga County, Ohio 44086; United States
- Coordinates: 41°41′27″N 81°2′48″W

Information
- Type: Public, Coeducational high school
- Opened: 1959
- Closed: 2015
- Grades: 9-12
- Colors: Red & white
- Team name: Redskins
- Website: www.ledgemont.k12.oh.us

Ledgemont High School was a public high school in Thompson Township, Geauga County, Ohio from 1959 until 2015. It was the only high school in the Ledgemont Local School District. Their nickname was the Redskins.

== History ==
Opened in 1959, Ledgemont High School housed students in grades 9-12.

The Thompson Road school building that Ledgemont High School occupied was known as Thompson Township School prior to 1959, built originally as an elementary building for Thompson School District in 1955. in 1959, Thompson and Montville Township school districts consolidated, forming Ledgemont High School. The County Board appointed a new School Board for the District ' Art Colbow and Bert Beadsley from Montville; Ernie Wagner, Robert Smith, and Charles Moseley from Thompson. in 1971, Ledgemont High School was moved into the Thompson Road building that was occupied by the elementary school, while the elementary school was moved into the older building on Route 528.

in March 2014 Ledgemont's Board of Education voted 3-2 to close the Thompson Road building, which the high school had occupied following the 2013-14 school year, due to financial problems that the district faced. The school board decided to move its 227 high school students to the elementary/middle school building on Burrows Road for the 2014-2015 school year, in 2015, Ledgemont underwent a territory transfer to Berkshire High School. Ledgemont had also discussed a territory transfer to the Madison and Cardinal school districts, but were shut down by both.

The Ledgemont High School building on Thompson Road still stands as of 2020.

== Athletics ==
=== State championships ===
- Boys' wrestling – 1992
