= 2013 Jacksonville Jaguars season =

19th season in franchise history

- Owner: Shahid Khan
- General manager: David Caldwell
- Head coach: Gus Bradley
- Offensive coordinator: Jedd Fisch
- Defensive coordinator: Bob Babich
- Home stadium: EverBank Field

Results
- Record: 4–12
- Division place: 3rd AFC South
- Playoffs: Did not qualify
- Pro Bowlers: ILB Paul Posluszny

Uniform
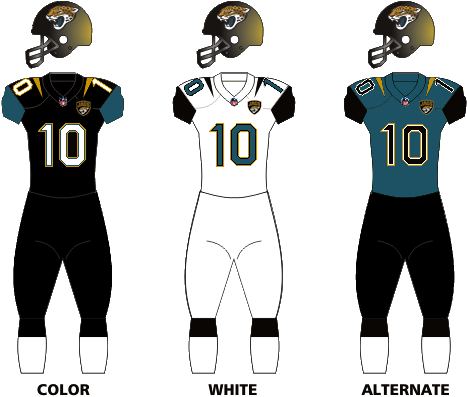

The 2013 season was the Jacksonville Jaguars' 19th in the National Football League (NFL), their first under general manager David Caldwell and their first under head coach Gus Bradley. Although they started 0–8 and missed the playoffs, the Jaguars improved upon their then-franchise-worst 2–14 record from 2012. Much like 2012, the root of their victories were intra-division. The Jaguars also gained a close non-divisional victory over the Browns to finish the year at 4–12. The Jaguars had the 32nd ranked offense by points scored.

== Offseason ==
=== Notable transactions ===
==== Acquisitions ====
- LB Geno Hayes, signed on March 13, 2013.
- DT Roy Miller, signed on March 15, 2013.
- RB Justin Forsett, signed on March 15, 2013.
- CB Alan Ball, signed on March 15, 2013.
- DT Sen'Derrick Marks, signed on April 2, 2013.
- DT Brandon Deaderick, claimed off waivers on May 14, 2013.
- CB Will Blackmon, signed on August 28, 2013.
- WR Stephen Burton, claimed off waivers on September 1, 2013.
- SS Winston Guy, claimed off waivers on September 1, 2013.
- TE Clay Harbor, claimed off waivers on September 1, 2013.
- OT Sam Young , Claimed off waivers on October 8, 2013

==== Departures ====
- OT Guy Whimper, released on February 27, 2013.
- S Dawan Landry, released on March 8, 2013.
- CB Aaron Ross, released on March 8, 2013.
- G Eben Britton, declared free agent on March 12, 2013.
- CB Derek Cox, declared free agent on March 12, 2013.
- RB Rashad Jennings, declared free agent on March 12, 2013.
- FB Greg Jones, declared free agent on March 12, 2013.
- DT Terrance Knighton, declared free agent on March 12, 2013.
- CB Rashean Mathis, declared free agent on March 12, 2013.
- CB William Middleton, declared free agent on March 12, 2013.
- LB Daryl Smith, declared free agent on March 12, 2013.
- WR Laurent Robinson, released on March 13, 2013.
- DT C. J. Mosley, released on April 1, 2013.
- RB/FB Montell Owens, released on May 16, 2013.
- DE Austen Lane, released on June 13, 2013.
- WR Jordan Shipley, released on September 1, 2013.
- FS Dwight Lowery, released from injured reserve on November 4, 2013.
- DE Jeremy Mincey, released on December 13, 2013.
- C Brad Meester, retired after 14 seasons with the team.

==== Trades ====
- Defensive tackle D'Anthony Smith was traded to the Seattle Seahawks for a conditional draft pick. Smith was released by the Seahawks on September 24, meaning the conditions of the trade were not fulfilled and the Jaguars did not receive the draft pick.
- Left tackle Eugene Monroe was traded to the Baltimore Ravens for the Ravens' fourth and fifth-round draft picks in the 2014 NFL draft.

=== NFL draft ===
2013 Jacksonville Jaguars draft
Round	Pick	Player	Position	College	Notes
1	2	Luke Joeckel	Offensive tackle	Texas A&M	
2	33	John Cyprien	Safety	Florida International	
3	64	Dwayne Gratz	Cornerback	Connecticut	
4	101	Ace Sanders	Wide receiver	South Carolina	
5	135	Denard Robinson	Running back	Michigan	
6	169	Josh Evans	Safety	Florida	
7	208	Jeremy Harris	Cornerback	New Mexico State	
7	210	Demetrius McCray	Cornerback	Appalachian State	
Made roster † Pro Football Hall of Fame * Made at least one Pro Bowl during career

Notes:

^{^[a]}The Jaguars traded their original fourth-round selection (No. 98 overall) selection to the Philadelphia Eagles in exchange for the Eagles' 2013 fourth- (No. 101 overall) and seventh- (No. 210 overall) round selections.

=== Undrafted rookie free agents ===
The following is a list of notable rookie free agents signed after the 2013 NFL draft:

Player	Position	College	Status
Abry Jones	Defensive tackle	Georgia	Made 53-man roster
LaRoy Reynolds	Linebacker	Virginia	Made 53-man roster
Carson Tinker	Long snapper	Alabama	Made 53-man roster
Marcus Burley	Cornerback	Delaware	Made practice squad
Tobais Palmer	Wide receiver	NC State	Made practice squad
Lonnie Pryor	Fullback	Florida State	Made practice squad
Matt Scott	Quarterback	Arizona	Made practice squad
Steven Terrell	Safety	Texas A&M	Made practice squad

== Staff ==
2013 Jacksonville Jaguars staff
Front office: Owner – Shahid Khan; President – Mark Lamping; General manager – David Caldwell; Director of football administration – Tim Walsh; Assistant director of player personnel – Andy Dengler; Director of pro personnel – Chris Polian; Director of college scouting – Kyle O'Brien; Assistant director of college personnel – Tim Mingey; Head coaches: Head coach – Gus Bradley; Assistant to the head coach – Tyler Wolf; Offensive coaches: Offensive coordinator – Jedd Fisch; Quarterbacks – Frank Scelfo; Running backs – Terry Richardson; Wide receivers – Jerry Sullivan; Tight ends/assistant special teams – Ron Middleton; Offensive line – George Yarno; Assistant offensive line – Luke Butkus; Offensive quality control – Tony Sorrentino	Defensive coaches: Defensive coordinator – Bob Babich; Defensive line – Todd Wash; Linebackers – Mark Duffner; Defensive backs – DeWayne Walker; Assistant defensive backs – Mike Rutenberg; Defensive assistant – Brandon Blaney; Assistant to the defensive staff – Aaron Whitecotton; Special teams coaches: Special teams coordinator – Mike Mallory; Assistant special teams – Matthew Smiley; Strength and conditioning: Strength and conditioning – Tom Myslinski; Strength assistant – Alex Hampton; Strength assistant – Jess Langvardt; Strength assistant – Cedric Scott

== Final roster ==
2013 Jacksonville Jaguars roster
Quarterbacks (QB): 11 Blaine Gabbert; 7 Chad Henne; 2 Ricky Stanzi; Running backs (RB): 34 Delone Carter; 32 Maurice Jones-Drew; 16 Denard Robinson; 45 Will Taʻufoʻou FB; 30 Jordan Todman; Wide receivers (WR): 12 Mike Brown; 18 Ace Sanders PR; 13 Kerry Taylor KR; 81 Lamaar Thomas; Tight ends (TE): 86 Clay Harbor; 89 Marcedes Lewis; 88 Danny Noble; 87 Allen Reisner	Offensive linemen (OL): 78 Cameron Bradfield T; 61 Patrick Lewis C; 66 Jacques McClendon G; 63 Brad Meester C; 64 Drew Nowak G; 77 Uche Nwaneri G; 67 Austin Pasztor T; 74 Sam Young T; Defensive linemen (DL): 93 Tyson Alualu; 58 Jason Babin; 90 Andre Branch DE; 59 Ryan Davis DE; 91 Abry Jones DT; 98 Kyle Love DT; 99 Sen'Derrick Marks DT; 96 Jordan Miller DT; 75 Drake Nevis DT; 94 Gerald Rivers DE	Linebackers (LB): 55 Geno Hayes OLB; 53 John Lotulelei; 51 Paul Posluszny MLB; 54 Nate Stupar MLB; 56 LaRoy Reynolds OLB; 52 J. T. Thomas OLB; Defensive backs (DB): 23 Alan Ball CB; 24 Will Blackmon CB; 37 Johnathan Cyprien SS; 26 Josh Evans FS; 29 Jamell Fleming CB; 27 Dwayne Gratz CB; 22 Winston Guy FS; 20 Mike Harris CB; 35 Demetrius McCray CB; 42 Chris Prosinski SS; Special teams (ST): 19 Bryan Anger P; 10 Josh Scobee K; 46 Carson Tinker LS	Practice squad: 85 Brandon Barden TE; 17 Chad Bumphis WR; 49 Shaun Chapas RB; 72 DeMarcus Love T; 95 D'Aundre Reed DE; 79 Will Pericak G; 9 Jabin Sambrano WR; 5 Matt Scott QB; Reserve: 50 Russell Allen OLB (IR); 14 Justin Blackmon WR (Susp.); 60 Mike Brewster G/C (IR); 15 Stephen Burton WR (IR); 92 Brandon Deaderick DT (IR); 80 Jeremy Ebert WR (IR); 21 Justin Forsett RB (IR); 31 Jeremy Harris CB (IR); 76 Luke Joeckel T (IR); -- Stephane Milhim G (IR); 97 Roy Miller DT (IR); -- Taylor Price WR (IR); 65 Will Rackley G (IR); 84 Cecil Shorts WR (IR); 83 Stephen Williams WR (IR); Rookies in italics 53 active, 15 reserve, 8 practice squad

== Preseason ==
Week	Date	Opponent	Result	Record	Venue	Recap
1	August 9	Miami Dolphins	L 3–27	0–1	EverBank Field	Recap
2	August 17	at New York Jets	L 13–37	0–2	MetLife Stadium	Recap
3	August 24	Philadelphia Eagles	L 24–31	0–3	EverBank Field	Recap
4	August 29	at Atlanta Falcons	W 20–16	1–3	Georgia Dome	Recap

== Regular season ==
=== Schedule ===
Week	Date	Opponent	Result	Record	Venue	Recap
1	September 8	Kansas City Chiefs	**L** 2–28	0–1	EverBank Field	Recap
2	September 15	at Oakland Raiders	**L** 9–19	0–2	O.co Coliseum	Recap
3	September 22	at Seattle Seahawks	**L** 17–45	0–3	CenturyLink Field	Recap
4	September 29	**Indianapolis Colts**	**L** 3–37	0–4	EverBank Field	Recap
5	October 6	at St. Louis Rams	**L** 20–34	0–5	Edward Jones Dome	Recap
6	October 13	at Denver Broncos	**L** 19–35	0–6	Sports Authority Field at Mile High	Recap
7	October 20	San Diego Chargers	**L** 6–24	0–7	EverBank Field	Recap
8	October 27	San Francisco 49ers	**L** 10–42	0–8	(United Kingdom) Wembley Stadium (London)	Recap
9	Bye					
10	November 10	at **Tennessee Titans**	**W** 29–27	1–8	LP Field	Recap
11	November 17	Arizona Cardinals	**L** 14–27	1–9	EverBank Field	Recap
12	November 24	at **Houston Texans**	**W** 13–6	2–9	Reliant Stadium	Recap
13	December 1	at Cleveland Browns	**W** 32–28	3–9	FirstEnergy Stadium	Recap
14	December 5	**Houston Texans**	**W** 27–20	4–9	EverBank Field	Recap
15	December 15	Buffalo Bills	**L** 20–27	4–10	EverBank Field	Recap
16	December 22	**Tennessee Titans**	**L** 16–20	4–11	EverBank Field	Recap
17	December 29	at **Indianapolis Colts**	**L** 10–30	4–12	Lucas Oil Stadium	Recap

Note: Intra-division opponents are in bold text.

=== Game summaries ===
==== Week 1: vs. Kansas City Chiefs ====
Week One: Kansas City Chiefs at Jacksonville Jaguars – Game summary

Quarter	1	2	3	4	Total
**Chiefs**	14	7	0	7	**28**
Jaguars	2	0	0	0	**2**

at EverBank Field, Jacksonville, Florida

- Date: September 8, 2013
- Game time: 1:00 p.m. EDT
- Game weather: 85 °F (29 °C)
- Game attendance: 59,416
- Referee: Pete Morelli
- TV announcers (CBS): Spero Dedes Steve Beuerlein, and Steve Tasker
- Recap, Game Book

Game information

**First quarter**

- JAC – Dustin Colquitt punt blocked by J.T. Thomas for safety, 12:26. Jaguars 2–0.
- KC – Donnie Avery 5-yard pass from Alex Smith (Ryan Succop kick), 9:04. Chiefs 7–2. **Drive: 3 plays, 24 yards, 1:20.**
- KC – Junior Hemingway 3-yard pass from Alex Smith (Ryan Succop kick), 1:35. Chiefs 14–2. **Drive: 2 plays, 21 yards, 0:33.**

**Second quarter**

- KC – Jamaal Charles 3-yard run (Ryan Succop kick), 6:26. Chiefs 21–2. **Drive: 8 plays, 57 yards, 4:42.**

**Third quarter**

- No scoring plays.

**Fourth quarter**

- KC – Tamba Hali 10-yard interception return (Ryan Succop kick), 12:51. Chiefs 28–2.

**Top passers**

- KC – Alex Smith – 21/34, 173 yards, 2 TD
- JAC – Blaine Gabbert – 16/36, 121 yards, 2 INT

**Top rushers**

- KC – Jamaal Charles – 16 rushes, 77 yards, TD
- JAC – Maurice Jones-Drew – 15 rushes, 45 yards

**Top receivers**

- KC – Anthony Sherman – 4 receptions, 44 yards
- JAC – Cecil Shorts – 3 receptions, 40 yards

**Top tacklers**

- KC – Derrick Johnson – 7 tackles
- JAC – Paul Posluszny – 10 tackles

==== Week 2: at Oakland Raiders ====
Week Two: Jacksonville Jaguars at Oakland Raiders – Game summary

Quarter	1	2	3	4	Total
Jaguars	0	3	0	6	**9**
**Raiders**	7	3	3	6	**19**

at O.co Coliseum, Oakland, California

- Date: September 15, 2012
- Game time: 1:25 p.m. PDT
- Game weather: Sunny, 76 °F (24 °C)
- Game attendance: 49,400
- Referee: Walt Anderson
- TV announcers (CBS): Spero Dedes, Steve Beuerlein, and Steve Tasker
- Recap, Game Book

Game information

**First quarter**

- OAK – Marcel Reece 11-yard run (Sebastian Janikowski kick), 10:52. Raiders 7–0. **Drive: 5 plays, 38 yards, 2:45.**

**Second quarter**

- JAC – Josh Scobee 27-yard field goal, 7:45. Raiders 7–3. **Drive: 15 plays, 78 yards, 6:56.**
- OAK – Sebastian Janikowski 46-yard field goal, 0:03. Raiders 10–3. **Drive: 10 plays, 44 yards, 2:47.**

**Third quarter**

- OAK – Sebastian Janikowski 30-yard field goal, 9:18. Raiders 13–3. **Drive: 12 plays, 69 yards, 5:42.**

**Fourth quarter**

- OAK – Sebastian Janikowski 29-yard field goal, 13:49. Raiders 16–3. **Drive: 7 plays, 43 yards, 3:56.**
- OAK – Sebastian Janikowski 29-yard field goal, 6:00. Raiders 19–3. **Drive: 10 plays, 52 yards, 6:23.**
- JAC – Clay Harbor 13-yard pass from Chad Henne (pass failed), 2:53. Raiders 19–9. **Drive: 6 plays, 49 yards, 1:54.**

**Top passers**

- JAC – Chad Henne – 25/38, 241 yards, TD
- OAK – Terrelle Pryor – 15/24, 126 yards

**Top rushers**

- JAC – Maurice Jones-Drew – 10 rushes, 27 yards
- OAK – Darren McFadden – 19 rushes, 129 yards

**Top receivers**

- JAC – Cecil Shorts – 8 receptions, 93 yards
- OAK – Rod Streater – 3 receptions, 42 yards

**Top tacklers**

- JAC – Geno Hayes – 7 tackles, 3 assists
- OAK – Charles Woodson – 6 tackles

==== Week 3: at Seattle Seahawks ====
Week Three: Jacksonville Jaguars at Seattle Seahawks – Game summary

Quarter	1	2	3	4	Total
Jaguars	0	0	10	7	**17**
**Seahawks**	7	17	14	7	**45**

at CenturyLink Field, Seattle, Washington

- Date: September 22, 2013
- Game time: 1:25 p.m. PDT
- Game weather: Rain, 61 °F (16 °C)
- Game attendance: 68,087
- Referee: Bill Vinovich
- TV announcers (CBS): Bill Macatee and Steve Tasker
- Recap, Game Book

Game information

**First quarter**

- SEA – Zach Miller 1-yard pass from Russell Wilson (Steven Hauschka kick), 8:04. Seahawks 7–0. **Drive: 7 plays, 71 yards, 3:27.**

**Second quarter**

- SEA – Zach Miller 4-yard pass from Russell Wilson (Steven Hauschka kick), 14:26. Seahawks 14–0. **Drive: 6 plays, 40 yards, 2:56.**
- SEA – Steven Hauschka 21-yard field goal, 9:20. Seahawks 17–0. **Drive: 5 plays, 44 yards, 2:43.**
- SEA – Sidney Rice 11-yard pass from Russell Wilson (Steven Hauschka kick), 0:10. Seahawks 24–0. **Drive: 5 plays, 79 yards, 0:34.**

**Third quarter**

- SEA – Sidney Rice 23-yard pass from Russell Wilson (Steven Hauschka kick), 11:41. Seahawks 31–0. **Drive: 3 plays, 33 yards, 1:26.**
- JAC – Maurice Jones-Drew 2-yard run (Josh Scobee kick), 6:20. Seahawks 31–7. **Drive: 2 plays, 2 yards, 0:11.**
- SEA – Doug Baldwin 35-yard pass from Tarvaris Jackson (Steven Hauschka kick), 1:28. Seahawks 38–7. **Drive: 5 plays, 58 yards, 2:26.**
- JAC – Josh Scobee 33-yard field goal, 0:06. Seahawks 38–10. **Drive: 5 plays, 65 yards, 1:22.**

**Fourth quarter**

- JAC – Jordan Todman 3-yard run (Josh Scobee kick), 9:06. Seahawks 38–17. **Drive: 9 plays, 52 yards, 3:09.**
- SEA – Tarvaris Jackson 5-yard run (Steven Hauschka kick), 6:32. Seahawks 45–17. **Drive: 5 plays, 80 yards, 2:34.**

**Top passers**

- JAC – Chad Henne – 18/38, 235 yards, 2 INT
- SEA – Russell Wilson – 14/21, 202 yards, 4 TD, INT

**Top rushers**

- JAC – Maurice Jones-Drew – 19 rushes, 43 yards, TD
- SEA – Marshawn Lynch – 17 rushes, 69 yards

**Top receivers**

- JAC – Cecil Shorts – 8 receptions, 143 yards
- SEA – Golden Tate – 5 receptions, 88 yards

**Top tacklers**

- JAC – Paul Posluszny – 12 tackles, 7 assists, 1 interception, 1 pass defended
- SEA – Byron Maxwell – 9 tackles, 6 assists, 1 interception, 1 pass defended

==== Week 4: vs. Indianapolis Colts ====
Week Four: Indianapolis Colts at Jacksonville Jaguars – Game summary

Quarter	1	2	3	4	Total
**Colts**	0	20	14	3	**37**
Jaguars	3	0	0	0	**3**

at EverBank Field, Jacksonville, Florida

- Date: September 29, 2013
- Game time: 1:00 p.m. EDT
- Game weather: 80 °F (27 °C)
- Game attendance: 59,695
- Referee: John Parry
- TV announcers (CBS): Kevin Harlan and Solomon Wilcots
- Recap, Game Book

Game information

**First quarter**

- JAC – Josh Scobee 53-yard field goal, 8:14. Jaguars 3–0. **Drive: 4 plays, 6 yards, 1:11.**

**Second quarter**

- IND – Adam Vinatieri 22-yard field goal, 14:43. Tied 3–3. **Drive: 11 plays, 54 yards, 3:43.**
- IND – Darius Butler 41-yard interception return (Adam Vinatieri kick), 11:48. Colts 10–3.
- IND – Trent Richardson 1-yard run (Adam Vinatieri kick), 5:54. Colts 17–3. **Drive: 6 plays, 81 yards, 3:28.**
- IND – Adam Vinatieri 46-yard field goal, 1:34. Colts 20–3. **Drive: 10 plays, 44 yards, 3:18.**

**Third quarter**

- IND – Coby Fleener 31-yard pass from Andrew Luck (Adam Vinatieri kick), 12:15. Colts 27–3. **Drive: 2 plays, 63 yards, 0:37.**
- IND – Reggie Wayne 5-yard pass from Andrew Luck (Adam Vinatieri kick), 1:22. Colts 34–3. **Drive: 12 plays, 72 yards, 8:35.**

**Fourth quarter**

- IND – Adam Vinatieri 28-yard field goal, 1:53. Colts 37–3. **Drive: 7 plays, 37 yards, 2:56.**

**Top passers**

- IND – Andrew Luck – 22/36, 260 yards, 2 TD, INT
- JAC – Blaine Gabbert – 17/32, 179 yards, 3 INT

**Top rushers**

- IND – Donald Brown – 3 rushes, 65 yards
- JAC – Maurice Jones-Drew – 13 rushes, 23 yards

**Top receivers**

- IND – Reggie Wayne – 5 receptions, 100 yards, TD
- JAC – Cecil Shorts – 7 receptions, 61 yards

**Top tacklers**

- IND – Robert Mathis – 5 tackles, 3 sacks
- JAC – Paul Posluszny – 9 tackles, 1 pass defended

==== Week 5: at St. Louis Rams ====
Week Five: Jacksonville Jaguars at St. Louis Rams – Game summary

Quarter	1	2	3	4	Total
Jaguars	10	0	3	7	**20**
**Rams**	7	17	0	10	**34**

at Edward Jones Dome, St. Louis, Missouri

- Date: October 6, 2013
- Game time: 12:00 p.m. CDT
- Game weather: None (indoor stadium)
- Game attendance: 54,266
- Referee: Tony Corrente
- TV announcers (CBS): Bill Macatee and Steve Tasker
- Recap, Game Book

Game information

**First quarter**

- JAC – Justin Blackmon 67-yard pass from Blaine Gabbert (Josh Scobee kick), 10:31. Jaguars 7–0. **Drive: 4 plays, 93 yards, 1:57.**
- STL – Matt Giordano 82-yard interception return (Greg Zuerlein kick), 3:08. Tied 7–7.
- JAC – Josh Scobee 48-yard field goal, 0:13. Jaguars 10–7. **Drive: 7 plays, 50 yards, 2:55.**

**Second quarter**

- STL – Greg Zuerlein 32-yard field goal, 12:03. Tied 10–10. **Drive: 8 plays, 66 yards, 3:10.**
- STL – Lance Kendricks 16-yard pass from Sam Bradford (Greg Zuerlein kick), 11:34. Rams 17–10. **Drive: 1 plays, 16 yards, 0:08.**
- STL – Austin Pettis 4-yard pass from Sam Bradford (Greg Zuerlein kick), 0:27. Rams 24–10. **Drive: 12 plays, 90 yards, 5:11.**

**Third quarter**

- JAC – Josh Scobee 34-yard field goal, 3:22. Rams 24–13. **Drive: 7 plays, 53 yards, 1:52.**

**Fourth quarter**

- STL – Greg Zuerlein 37-yard field goal, 14:47. Rams 27–13. **Drive: 10 plays, 65 yards, 3:35.**
- JAC – Cecil Shorts 4-yard pass from Chad Henne (Josh Scobee kick), 10:22. Rams 27–20. **Drive: 12 plays, 80 yards, 4:25.**
- STL – Austin Pettis 31-yard pass from Sam Bradford (Greg Zuerlein kick), 5:45. Rams 34–20. **Drive: 8 plays, 80 yards, 4:37.**

**Top passers**

- JAC – Blaine Gabbert – 9/19, 181 yards, TD, 2 INT
- STL – Sam Bradford – 19/34, 222 yards, 3 TD

**Top rushers**

- JAC – Maurice Jones-Drew – 17 rushes, 70 yards
- STL – Zac Stacy – 14 rushes, 78 yards

**Top receivers**

- JAC – Justin Blackmon – 5 receptions, 136 yards, TD
- STL – Austin Pettis – 4 receptions, 49 yards, 2 TD

**Top tacklers**

- JAC – John Cyprien – 12 tackles
- STL – James Laurinaitis – 8 tackles, 2 assists, 1 interception, 1 pass defended

==== Week 6: at Denver Broncos ====
Week Six: Jacksonville Jaguars at Denver Broncos – Game summary

Quarter	1	2	3	4	Total
Jaguars	0	12	7	0	**19**
**Broncos**	14	0	14	7	**35**

at Sports Authority Field at Mile High, Denver, Colorado

- Date: October 13, 2013
- Game time: 2:05 p.m. MDT
- Game weather: Partly cloudy, 59 °F (15 °C)
- Game attendance: 76,862
- Referee: Jeff Triplette
- TV announcers (CBS): Ian Eagle, Dan Fouts, and Shannon Sharpe
- Recap, Game Book

Game information

**First quarter**

- DEN – Julius Thomas 3-yard pass from Peyton Manning (Matt Prater kick), 12:09. Broncos 7–0. **Drive: 6 plays, 27 yards, 2:02.**
- DEN – Wes Welker 20-yard pass from Peyton Manning (Matt Prater kick), 2:44. Broncos 14–0. **Drive: 12 plays, 95 yards, 6:08.**

**Second quarter**

- JAC – Josh Scobee 50-yard field goal, 13:18. Broncos 14–3. **Drive: 10 plays, 48 yards, 4:26.**
- JAC – Josh Scobee 30-yard field goal, 5:43. Broncos 14–6. **Drive: 8 plays, 28 yards, 2:20.**
- JAC – Paul Posluszny 59-yard interception return (pass failed), 0:36. Broncos 14–12.

**Third quarter**

- DEN – Knowshon Moreno 1-yard run (Matt Prater kick), 12:16. Broncos 21–12. **Drive: 8 plays, 80 yards, 2:44.**
- JAC – Maurice Jones-Drew 5-yard run (Josh Scobee kick), 7:43. Broncos 21–19. **Drive: 9 plays, 80 yards, 4:33.**
- DEN – Knowshon Moreno 8-yard run (Matt Prater kick), 4:02. Broncos 28–19. **Drive: 8 plays, 80 yards, 3:41.**

**Fourth quarter**

- DEN – Knowshon Moreno 3-yard run (Matt Prater kick), 9:09. Broncos 35–12. **Drive: 5 plays, 41 yards, 2:19.**

**Top passers**

- JAC – Chad Henne – 27/42, 303 yards, 2 INT
- DEN – Peyton Manning – 28/42, 298 yards, 2 TD, INT

**Top rushers**

- JAC – Maurice Jones-Drew – 21 rushes, 71 yards, TD
- DEN – Knowshon Moreno – 15 rushes, 42 yards, 3 TD

**Top receivers**

- JAC – Justin Blackmon – 14 receptions, 190 yards
- DEN – Wes Welker – 6 receptions, 63 yards, TD

**Top tacklers**

- JAC – Mike Harris – 8 tackles, 1 assist, 1 fumble recovered
- DEN – Chris Harris – 11 tackles, 1 assist

==== Week 7: vs. San Diego Chargers ====
Week Seven: San Diego Chargers at Jacksonville Jaguars – Game summary

Quarter	1	2	3	4	Total
**Chargers**	7	7	3	7	**24**
Jaguars	0	3	3	0	**6**

at EverBank Field, Jacksonville, Florida

- Date: October 20, 2013
- Game time: 1:00 p.m. EDT
- Game weather: 73 °F (23 °C)
- Game attendance: 59,550
- Referee: Walt Coleman
- TV announcers (CBS): Spero Dedes and Steve Beuerlein
- Recap, Game Book

Game information

**First quarter**

- SD – Danny Woodhead 2-yard run (Nick Novak kick), 7:23. Chargers 7–0. **Drive: 13 plays, 80 yards, 7:37.**

**Second quarter**

- SD – Eddie Royal 27-yard pass from Philip Rivers (Nick Novak kick), 12:36. Chargers 14–0. **Drive: 10 plays, 80 yards, 6:08.**
- JAC – Josh Scobee 30-yard field goal, 4:50. Chargers 14–3. **Drive: 18 plays, 68 yards, 7:46.**

**Third quarter**

- SD – Nick Novak 20-yard field goal, 6:48. Chargers 17–3. **Drive: 10 plays, 79 yards, 6:21.**
- JAC – Josh Scobee 23-yard field goal, 3:54. Chargers 17–6. **Drive: 8 plays, 75 yards, 2:54.**

**Fourth quarter**

- SD – Ryan Matthews 3-yard run (Nick Novak kick), 14:08. Chargers 24–6. **Drive: 10 plays, 84 yards, 4:46.**

**Top passers**

- SD – Philip Rivers – 22/26, 285 yards, TD
- JAC – Chad Henne – 23/36, 318 yards, INT

**Top rushers**

- SD – Ryan Matthews – 21 rushes, 110 yards, TD
- JAC – Maurice Jones-Drew – 9 rushes, 37 yards

**Top receivers**

- SD – Eddie Royal – 4 receptions, 69 yards, TD
- JAC – Cecil Shorts – 8 receptions, 80 yards

**Top tacklers**

- SD – Eric Weddle – 5 tackles
- JAC – Paul Posluszny – 14 tackles

==== Week 8: vs. San Francisco 49ers ====
NFL International Series

Week Eight: San Francisco 49ers at Jacksonville Jaguars – Game summary

Quarter	1	2	3	4	Total
**49ers**	14	14	7	7	**42**
Jaguars	0	3	7	0	**10**

at Wembley Stadium, London, England

- Date: October 27, 2013
- Game time: 5:00 p.m. GMT/1:00 p.m. EDT
- Game weather: Rain showers, 60 °F (16 °C)
- Game attendance: 83,559
- Referee: Ed Hochuli
- TV announcers (Fox): Chris Myers, Tim Ryan, and Jennifer Hale
- Recap, Game Book

Game information

**First quarter**

- SF – Frank Gore 2-yard run (Phil Dawson kick), 11:42. 49ers 7–0. **Drive: 8 plays, 76 yards, 3:18.**
- SF – Colin Kaepernick 12-yard run (Phil Dawson kick), 2:36. 49ers 14–0. **Drive: 8 plays, 80 yards, 4:14.**

**Second quarter**

- SF – Vernon Davis 2-yard pass from Colin Kaepernick (Phil Dawson kick), 11:52. 49ers 21–0. **Drive: 10 plays, 72 yards, 4:41.**
- SF – Colin Kaepernick 9-yard run (Phil Dawson kick), 7:49. 49ers 28–0. **Drive: 6 plays, 63 yards, 2:38.**
- JAC – Josh Scobee 23-yard field goal, 0:10. 49ers 28–3. **Drive: 12 plays, 60 yards, 2:40.**

**Third quarter**

- JAC – Mike Brown 29-yard pass from Chad Henne (Josh Scobee kick), 3:00. 49ers 28–10. **Drive: 3 plays, 28 yards, 0:52.**
- SF – Frank Gore 2-yard run (Phil Dawson kick), 0:52. 49ers 35–10. **Drive: 13 plays, 80 yards, 7:37.**

**Fourth quarter**

- SF – Dan Skuta 47-yard fumble return (Phil Dawson kick), 13:24. 49ers 42–10.

**Top passers**

- SF – Colin Kaepernick – 21/34, 173 yards, 2 TD
- JAC – Chad Henne – 16/36, 121 yards, 2 INT

**Top rushers**

- SF – Kendall Hunter – 9 rushes, 84 yards
- JAC – Maurice Jones-Drew – 19 rushes, 75 yards

**Top receivers**

- SF – Anquan Boldin – 4 receptions, 56 yards
- JAC – Cecil Shorts – 7 receptions, 74 yards

**Top tacklers**

- SF – NaVorro Bowman – 7 tackles, pass defended
- JAC – Paul Posluszny – 10 tackles, 2 assists

==== Week 10: at Tennessee Titans ====
Week Ten: Jacksonville Jaguars at Tennessee Titans – Game summary

Quarter	1	2	3	4	Total
**Jaguars**	10	3	7	9	**29**
Titans	0	7	3	17	**27**

at LP Field, Nashville, Tennessee

- Date: November 10, 2013
- Game time: 12:00 p.m. CST
- Game weather: Sunny, 62 °F (17 °C)
- Game attendance: 69,143
- Referee: John Parry
- TV announcers (CBS): Bill Macatee and Steve Tasker
- Recap, Game Book

Game information

**First quarter**

- JAC – Maurice Jones-Drew 6-yard run (Josh Scobee kick), 13:29. Jaguars 7–0. **Drive: 3 plays, 19 yards, 1:15.**
- JAC – Josh Scobee 32-yard field goal, 6:31. Jaguars 10–0. **Drive: 8 plays, 50 yards, 3:20.**

**Second quarter**

- JAC – Josh Scobee 44-yard field goal, 10:47. Jaguars 13–0. **Drive: 7 plays, 19 yards, 3:18.**
- TEN – Taylor Thompson 9-yard pass from Ryan Fitzpatrick (Rob Bironas kick), 0:41. Jaguars 13–7. **Drive: 8 plays, 52 yards, 3:44.**

**Third quarter**

- JAC – Jordan Todman 5-yard run (Josh Scobee kick), 10:17. Jaguars 20–7. **Drive: 8 plays, 79 yards, 4:43.**
- TEN – Rob Bironas 39-yard field goal, 5:15. Jaguars 20–10. **Drive: 11 plays, 59 yards, 5:02.**

**Fourth quarter**

- TEN – Rob Bironas 37-yard field goal, 12:50. Jaguars 20–13. **Drive: 4 plays, 7 yards, 1:24.**
- JAC – Penalty on Chance Warmack enforced in end zone for a safety, 7:44. Jaguars 22–13.
- TEN – Ryan Fitzpatrick 4-yard run (Rob Bironas kick), 4:15. Jaguars 22–20. **Drive: 5 plays, 72 yards, 1:43.**
- JAC – Will Blackmon 21-yard fumble return (Josh Scobee kick), 2:32. Jaguars 29–20.
- TEN – Delanie Walker 14-yard pass from Ryan Fitzpatrick (Rob Bironas kick), 0:40. Jaguars 29–27. **Drive: 12 plays, 82 yards, 1:52.**

**Top passers**

- JAC – Chad Henne – 14/23, 180 yards, 2 INT
- TEN – Ryan Fitzpatrick – 22/33, 264 yards, 2 TD

**Top rushers**

- JAC – Maurice Jones-Drew – 21 rushes, 41 yards, TD
- TEN – Chris Johnson – 12 rushes, 30 yards

**Top receivers**

- JAC – Cecil Shorts – 2 receptions, 42 yards
- TEN – Kendall Wright – 7 receptions, 78 yards

**Top tacklers**

- JAC – Geno Hayes – 9 tackles, 2 assists, 1 pass defended, 1 forced fumble
- TEN – Colin McCarthy – 4 tackles, 3 assists, 1 interception, 1 pass defended, 1 forced fumble

==== Week 11: vs. Arizona Cardinals ====
Week Eleven: Arizona Cardinals at Jacksonville Jaguars – Game summary

Quarter	1	2	3	4	Total
**Cardinals**	7	7	10	3	**27**
Jaguars	14	0	0	0	**14**

at EverBank Field, Jacksonville, Florida

- Date: November 17, 2013
- Game time: 1:00 p.m. EST
- Game weather: 76 °F (24 °C)
- Game attendance: 59,862
- Referee: Jeff Triplette
- TV announcers (Fox): Dick Stockton, Ronde Barber, and Kris Budden
- Recap, Game Book

Game information

**First quarter**

- JAC – Danny Noble 62-yard pass from Chad Henne (Josh Scobee kick), 12:53. Jaguars 7–0. **Drive: 4 plays, 71 yards, 2:07.**
- ARI – Larry Fitzgerald 14-yard pass from Carson Palmer (Jay Feely kick), 7:50. Tied 7–7. **Drive: 10 plays, 80 yards, 5:03.**
- JAC – Maurice Jones-Drew 1-yard run (Josh Scobee kick), 5:08. Jaguars 14–7. **Drive: 7 plays, 46 yards, 2:42.**

**Second quarter**

- ARI – Rashard Mendenhall 5-yard run (Jay Feely kick), 1:55. Tied 14–14. **Drive: 5 plays, 70 yards, 2:06.**

**Third quarter**

- ARI – Jay Feely 21-yard field goal, 10:36. Cardinals 17–14. **Drive: 9 plays, 77 yards, 4:24.**
- ARI – Michael Floyd 91-yard pass from Carson Palmer (Jay Feely kick), 7:29. Cardinals 24–14. **Drive: 3 plays, 91 yards, 1:29.**

**Fourth quarter**

- ARI – Jay Feely 32-yard field goal, 7:03. Cardinals 27–14. **Drive: 5 plays, 8 yards, 2:16.**

**Top passers**

- ARI – Carson Palmer – 30/42, 419 yards, 2 TD
- JAC – Chad Henne – 27/42, 255 yards, TD, 2 INT

**Top rushers**

- ARI – Rashard Mendenhall – 13 rushes, 14 yards, TD
- JAC – Maurice Jones-Drew – 14 rushes, 23 yards, TD

**Top receivers**

- ARI – Michael Floyd – 6 receptions, 193 yards, TD
- JAC – Danny Noble – 1 reception, 62 yards, TD

**Top tacklers**

- ARI – Jerraud Powers – 6 tackles, 1 interception, 2 passes defended
- JAC – John Cyprien – 8 tackles

==== Week 12: at Houston Texans ====
Week Twelve: Jacksonville Jaguars at Houston Texans – Game summary

Quarter	1	2	3	4	Total
**Jaguars**	7	3	0	3	**13**
Texans	0	3	3	0	**6**

at Reliant Stadium, Houston, Texas

- Date: November 24, 2013
- Game time: 12:00 p.m. CST
- Game weather: None (retractable roof closed)
- Game attendance: 71,659
- Referee: Mike Carey
- TV announcers (CBS): Bill Macatee and Steve Tasker
- Recap, Game Book

Game information

**First quarter**

- JAC – Maurice Jones-Drew 1-yard run (Josh Scobee kick), 10:57. Jaguars 7–0. **Drive: 10 plays, 75 yards, 4:03.**

**Second quarter**

- JAC – Josh Scobee 30-yard field goal, 7:57. Jaguars 10–0. **Drive: 7 plays, 73 yards, 4:01.**
- HOU – Randy Bullock 49-yard field goal, 0:29. Jaguars 10–3. **Drive: 9 plays, 49 yards, 4:35.**

**Third quarter**

- HOU – Randy Bullock 20-yard field goal, 8:26. Jaguars 10–6. **Drive: 13 plays, 83 yards, 6:34.**

**Fourth quarter**

- JAC – Josh Scobee 53-yard field goal, 6:44. Jaguars 13–6. **Drive: 8 plays, 42 yards, 4:27.**

**Top passers**

- JAC – Chad Henne – 23/32, 239 yards
- HOU – Case Keenum – 18/34, 169 yards, INT

**Top rushers**

- JAC – Maurice Jones-Drew – 14 rushes, 84 yards, TD
- HOU – Dennis Johnson – 13 rushes, 74 yards

**Top receivers**

- JAC – Cecil Shorts – 8 receptions, 71 yards
- HOU – Ryan Griffin – 1 reception, 37 yards

**Top tacklers**

- JAC – Paul Posluszny – 11 tackles, 3 assists
- HOU – J. J. Watt – 8 tackles, 1 assist, 1 blocked field goal

==== Week 13: at Cleveland Browns ====
Week Thirteen: Jacksonville Jaguars at Cleveland Browns – Game summary

Quarter	1	2	3	4	Total
**Jaguars**	7	13	0	12	**32**
Browns	7	7	7	7	**28**

at FirstEnergy Stadium, Cleveland, Ohio

- Date: December 1, 2013
- Game time: 1:00 p.m. EST
- Game weather: Overcast, 40 °F (4 °C)
- Game attendance: 69,654
- Referee: Bill Leavy
- TV announcers (CBS): Kevin Harlan and Solomon Wilcots
- Recap, Game Book

Game information

**First quarter**

- CLE – Willis McGahee 1-yard run (Billy Cundiff kick), 10:51. Browns 7–0. **Drive: 3 plays, 47 yards, 1:07.**
- JAC – Clay Harbor 18-yard pass from Chad Henne (Josh Scobee kick), 7:04. Tied 7–7. **Drive: 8 plays, 80 yards, 3:47.**

**Second quarter**

- CLE – Josh Gordon 21-yard pass from Brandon Weeden (Billy Cundiff kick), 12:03. Browns 14–7. **Drive: 11 plays, 92 yards, 5:17.**
- JAC – Marcedes Lewis 8-yard pass from Maurice Jones-Drew (Josh Scobee kick), 1:19. Tied 14–14. **Drive: 3 plays, 17 yards, 1:16.**
- JAC – Josh Scobee 44-yard field goal, 0:48. Jaguars 17–14. **Drive: 4 plays, 2 yards, 0:26.**
- JAC – Josh Scobee 36-yard field goal, 0:00. Jaguars 20–14. **Drive: 1 plays, 0 yards, 0:05.**

**Third quarter**

- CLE – Greg Little 4-yard pass from Brandon Weeden (Billy Cundiff kick), 9:44. Browns 21–20. **Drive: 10 plays, 80 yards, 5:16.**

**Fourth quarter**

- JAC – Penalty on Brandon Weeden enforced in end zone for a safety, 7:42. Jaguars 22–21.
- JAC – Josh Scobee 25-yard field goal, 4:14. Jaguars 25–21. **Drive: 7 plays, 36 yards, 3:28.**
- CLE – Josh Gordon 95-yard pass from Brandon Weeden (Billy Cundiff kick), 3:55. Browns 28–25. **Drive: 1 plays, 95 yards, 0:19.**
- JAC – Cecil Shorts 20-yard pass from Chad Henne (Josh Scobee kick), 0:40. Jaguars 32–28. **Drive: 9 plays, 80 yards, 3:15.**

**Top passers**

- JAC – Chad Henne – 22/40, 195 yards, 2 TD, INT
- CLE – Brandon Weeden – 24/40, 370 yards, 3 TD, 2 INT

**Top rushers**

- JAC – Maurice Jones-Drew – 23 rushes, 77 yards
- CLE – Willis McGahee – 14 rushes, 57 yards, TD

**Top receivers**

- JAC – Ace Sanders – 8 receptions, 67 yards
- CLE – Josh Gordon – 10 receptions, 261 yards, 2 TD

**Top tacklers**

- JAC – Paul Posluszny – 11 tackles, 0.5 sack
- CLE – T. J. Ward – 7 tackles

==== Week 14: vs. Houston Texans ====
Week Fourteen: Houston Texans at Jacksonville Jaguars – Game summary

Quarter	1	2	3	4	Total
Texans	0	7	10	3	**20**
**Jaguars**	7	10	7	3	**27**

at EverBank Field, Jacksonville, Florida

- Date: December 5, 2013
- Game time: 8:25 p.m. EST
- Game weather: 72 °F (22 °C)
- Game attendance: 60,414
- Referee: Tony Corrente
- TV announcers (NFLN): Brad Nessler, Mike Mayock, and Alex Flanagan
- Recap, Game Book

Game information

**First quarter**

- JAC – Marcedes Lewis 1-yard pass from Chad Henne (Josh Scobee kick), 8:48. Jaguars 7–0. **Drive: 13 plays, 80 yards, 6:12.**

**Second quarter**

- JAC – Cecil Shorts 6-yard pass from Chad Henne (Josh Scobee kick), 13:41. Jaguars 14–0. **Drive: 4 plays, 86 yards, 1:30.**
- HOU – Keshawn Martin 8-yard pass from Case Keenum (Randy Bullock kick), 1:53. Jaguars 14–7. **Drive: 12 plays, 91 yards, 6:57.**
- JAC – Josh Scobee 40-yard field goal, 0:03. Jaguars 17–7. **Drive: 6 plays, 37 yards, 6:57.**

**Third quarter**

- HOU – Randy Bullock 34-yard field goal, 8:29. Jaguars 17–10. **Drive: 5 plays, 30 yards, 1:20.**
- JAC – Jordan Todman 21-yard pass from Ace Sanders (Josh Scobee kick), 6:12. Jaguars 24–10. **Drive: 6 plays, 88 yards, 2:17.**
- HOU – Garrett Graham 6-yard pass from Matt Schaub (Randy Bullock kick), 1:08. Jaguars 24–17. **Drive: 7 plays, 76 yards, 3:02.**

**Fourth quarter**

- HOU – Randy Bullock 31-yard field goal, 11:31. Jaguars 24–20. **Drive: 7 plays, 76 yards, 3:02.**
- JAC – Josh Scobee 39-yard field goal, 0:25. Jaguars 27–20. **Drive: 4 plays, 0 yards, 1:43.**

**Top passers**

- HOU – Matt Schaub – 17/29, 198 yards, TD, INT
- JAC – Chad Henne – 12/27, 117 yards, 2 TD

**Top rushers**

- HOU – Ben Tate – 14 rushes, 53 yards
- JAC – Maurice Jones-Drew – 14 rushes, 103 yards

**Top receivers**

- HOU – Andre Johnson – 13 receptions, 154 yards
- JAC – Marcedes Lewis – 2 receptions, 42 yards, TD

**Top tacklers**

- HOU – Kareem Jackson – 5 tackles, 1 assist, 1 pass defended
- JAC – Paul Posluszny – 10 tackles, 3 assists

==== Week 15: vs. Buffalo Bills ====
Week Fifteen: Buffalo Bills at Jacksonville Jaguars – Game summary

Quarter	1	2	3	4	Total
**Bills**	3	17	0	7	**27**
Jaguars	3	7	3	7	**20**

at EverBank Field, Jacksonville, Florida

- Date: December 15, 2013
- Game time: 1:00 p.m. EST
- Game weather: 60 °F (16 °C)
- Game attendance: 60,085
- Referee: Ron Winter
- TV announcers (CBS): Andrew Catalon and Rich Gannon
- Recap, Game Book

Game information

**First quarter**

- BUF – Dan Carpenter 42-yard field goal, 13:10. Bills 3–0. **Drive: 4 plays, 1 yards, 0:48.**
- JAC – Josh Scobee 32-yard field goal, 8:07. Tied 3–3. **Drive: 6 plays, 19 yards, 1:48.**

**Second quarter**

- JAC – Ace Sanders 12-yard pass from Chad Henne (Josh Scobee kick), 14:54. Jaguars 10–3. **Drive: 10 plays, 56 yards, 3:33.**
- BUF – Robert Woods 6-yard pass from EJ Manuel (Dan Carpenter kick), 7:07. Tied 10–10. **Drive: 9 plays, 94 yards, 4:05.**
- BUF – EJ Manuel 8-yard run (Dan Carpenter kick), 2:14. Bills 17–10. **Drive: 8 plays, 72 yards, 3:27.**
- BUF – Dan Carpenter 40-yard field goal, 0:00. Bills 20–10. **Drive: 3 plays, 39 yards, 0:26.**

**Third quarter**

- JAC – Josh Scobee 55-yard field goal, 4:43. Bills 20–13. **Drive: 5 plays, 39 yards, 2:00.**

**Fourth quarter**

- JAC – Marcedes Lewis 13-yard pass from Chad Henne (Josh Scobee kick), 13:50. Tied 20–20. **Drive: 7 plays, 55 yards, 2:25.**
- BUF – Frank Summers 1-yard pass from EJ Manuel (Dan Carpenter kick), 9:35. Bills 27–20. **Drive: 9 plays, 80 yards, 4:15.**

**Top passers**

- BUF – EJ Manuel – 17/24, 193 yards, 2 TD, INT
- JAC – Chad Henne – 21/36, 237 yards, 2 TD, 2 INT

**Top rushers**

- BUF – Fred Jackson – 17 rushes, 80 yards
- JAC – Jordan Todman – 25 rushes, 109 yards

**Top receivers**

- BUF – Robert Woods – 5 receptions, 82 yards, TD
- JAC – Marcedes Lewis – 4 receptions, 54 yards, TD

**Top tacklers**

- BUF – Leodis McKelvin – 8 tackles, 1 pass defended, 1 forced fumble
- JAC – Paul Posluszny – 9 tackles, 4 assists, 1 sack

==== Week 16: vs. Tennessee Titans ====
Week Sixteen: Tennessee Titans at Jacksonville Jaguars – Game summary

Quarter	1	2	3	4	Total
**Titans**	3	3	7	7	**20**
Jaguars	7	6	3	0	**16**

at EverBank Field, Jacksonville, Florida

- Date: December 22, 2013
- Game time: 1:00 p.m. EST
- Game weather: 79 °F (26 °C)
- Game attendance: 60,559
- Referee: Bill Vinovich
- TV announcers (CBS): Andrew Catalon and Adam Archuleta
- Recap, Game Book

Game information

**First quarter**

- TEN – Rob Bironas 45-yard field goal, 9:05. Titans 3–0. **Drive: 7 plays, 64 yards, 3:46.**
- JAC – Marcedes Lewis 4-yard pass from Chad Henne (Josh Scobee kick), 4:45. Jaguars 7–3. **Drive: 9 plays, 80 yards, 4:20.**

**Second quarter**

- TEN – Rob Bironas 52-yard field goal, 1:55. Jaguars 7–6. **Drive: 11 plays, 32 yards, 5:11.**
- JAC – Mike Brown 7-yard pass from Chad Henne (kick failed), 0:43. Jaguars 13–6. **Drive: 7 plays, 60 yards, 1:12.**

**Third quarter**

- JAC – Josh Scobee 36-yard field goal, 9:22. Jaguars 16–6. **Drive: 8 plays, 17 yards, 4:25.**
- TEN – Shonn Greene 1-yard run (Rob Bironas kick), 4:01. Jaguars 16–13. **Drive: 11 plays, 80 yards, 5:21.**

**Fourth quarter**

- TEN – Nate Washington 30-yard pass from Ryan Fitzpatrick (Rob Bironas kick), 14:25. Titans 20–16. **Drive: 9 plays,73 yards, 3:47.**

**Top passers**

- TEN – Ryan Fitzpatrick – 17/26, 181 yards, TD, INT
- JAC – Chad Henne – 24/34, 237 yards, 2 TD, INT

**Top rushers**

- TEN – Shonn Greene – 19 rushes, 91 yards, TD
- JAC – Maurice Jones-Drew – 13 rushes, 45 yards

**Top receivers**

- TEN – Nate Washington – 6 receptions, 117 yards, TD
- JAC – Mike Brown – 5 receptions, 71 yards, TD

**Top tacklers**

- TEN – Moise Fokou – 6 tackles
- JAC – Paul Posluszny – 10 tackles, 3 assists, 0.5 sack

==== Week 17: at Indianapolis Colts ====
Week Seventeen: Jacksonville Jaguars at Indianapolis Colts – Game summary

Quarter	1	2	3	4	Total
Jaguars	0	3	0	7	**10**
**Colts**	17	3	7	3	**30**

at Lucas Oil Stadium, Indianapolis, Indiana

- Date: December 29, 2013
- Game time: 1:00 p.m. EST
- Game weather: None (retractable roof closed)
- Game attendance: 66,008
- Referee: Pete Morelli
- TV announcers (CBS): Bill Macatee and Steve Tasker
- Recap, Game Book

Game information

**First quarter**

- IND – Donald Brown 1-yard run (Adam Vinatieri kick), 10:45. Colts 7–0. **Drive: 8 plays, 42 yards, 3:08.**
- IND – Trent Richardson 2-yard run (Adam Vinatieri kick), 7:30. Colts 14–0. **Drive: 7 plays, 54 yards, 2:20.**
- IND – Adam Vinatieri 23-yard field goal, 1:22. Colts 17–0. **Drive: 12 plays, 74 yards, 4:27.**

**Second quarter**

- JAC – Josh Scobee 37-yard field goal, 11:55. Colts 17–3. **Drive: 11 plays, 41 yards, 4:27.**
- IND – Adam Vinatieri 26-yard field goal, 0:00. Colts 20–3. **Drive: 6 plays, 31 yards, 0:53.**

**Third quarter**

- IND – Griff Whalen 7-yard pass from Andrew Luck (Adam Vinatieri kick), 10:39. Colts 27–3. **Drive: 7 plays, 80 yards, 4:21.**

**Fourth quarter**

- IND – Adam Vinatieri 39-yard field goal, 8:00. Colts 30–3. **Drive: 7 plays, 43 yards, 3:49.**
- JAC – Kerry Taylor 14-yard pass from Chad Henne (Josh Scobee kick), 0:16. Colts 30–10. **Drive: 9 plays, 91 yards, 1:36.**

**Top passers**

- JAC – Chad Henne – 30/51, 331 yards, TD, INT
- IND – Andrew Luck – 26/37, 282 yards, TD

**Top rushers**

- JAC – Maurice Jones-Drew – 13 rushes, 39 yards
- IND – Donald Brown – 12 rushes, 31 yards, TD

**Top receivers**

- JAC – Kerry Taylor – 8 receptions, 75 yards, TD
- IND – T. Y. Hilton – 11 receptions, 155 yards

**Top tacklers**

- JAC – Paul Posluszny – 6 tackles, 3 assists
- IND – Darius Butler – 6 tackles, 2 assists, 1 fumble recovery

=== Standings ===
==== Division ====
AFC South
	W	L	T	PCT	DIV	CONF	PF	PA	STK
^{(4)} Indianapolis Colts	11	5	0	.688	6–0	9–3	391	336	W3
Tennessee Titans	7	9	0	.438	2–4	6–6	362	381	W2
Jacksonville Jaguars	4	12	0	.250	3–3	4–8	247	449	L3
Houston Texans	2	14	0	.125	1–5	2–10	276	428	L14

==== Conference ====
AFC
#	Team	Division	W	L	T	PCT	DIV	CONF	SOS	SOV	STK
**Division winners**
1	Denver Broncos	West	13	3	0	.813	5–1	9–3	.469	.423	W2
2	New England Patriots	East	12	4	0	.750	4–2	9–3	.473	.427	W2
3 (Note: Cincinnati defeated Indianapolis head-to-head (Week 14, 42–28).)	Cincinnati Bengals	North	11	5	0	.688	3–3	8–4	.480	.494	W2
4	Indianapolis Colts	South	11	5	0	.688	6–0	9–3	.484	.449	W3
**Wild cards**
5	Kansas City Chiefs	West	11	5	0	.688	2–4	7–5	.445	.335	L2
6	San Diego Chargers	West	9	7	0	.563	4–2	6–6	.496	.549	W4
**Did not qualify for the postseason**
7 (Note: Pittsburgh finished with a better division record than Baltimore.) (Note: Pittsburgh defeated the New York Jets head-to-head (Week 6, 19–6).)	Pittsburgh Steelers	North	8	8	0	.500	4–2	6–6	.469	.441	W3
8 (Note: Baltimore defeated the New York Jets head-to-head (Week 12, 19–3).)	Baltimore Ravens	North	8	8	0	.500	3–3	6–6	.484	.418	L2
9 (Note: The New York Jets finished with a better division record than Miami.)	New York Jets	East	8	8	0	.500	3–3	5–7	.488	.414	W2
10	Miami Dolphins	East	8	8	0	.500	2–4	7–5	.523	.523	L2
11	Tennessee Titans	South	7	9	0	.438	2–4	6–6	.504	.375	W2
12	Buffalo Bills	East	6	10	0	.375	3–3	5–7	.520	.500	L1
13 (Note: Oakland and Jacksonville finished with a better conference record than Cleveland.) (Note: Oakland defeated Jacksonville head-to-head (Week 2, 19–9).)	Oakland Raiders	West	4	12	0	.250	1–5	4–8	.523	.359	L6
14 (Note: Jacksonville defeated Cleveland head-to-head (Week 13, 32–28).)	Jacksonville Jaguars	South	4	12	0	.250	3–3	4–8	.504	.234	L3
15	Cleveland Browns	North	4	12	0	.250	2–4	3–9	.516	.477	L7
16	Houston Texans	South	2	14	0	.125	1–5	2–10	.559	.500	L14
**Tiebreakers** (Note: When breaking ties for three or more teams under the NFL's rules, they are first broken within divisions, then comparing only the highest ranked remaining team from each division.)
