= EMH =

EMH may refer to:

- Efficient-market hypothesis, a hypothesis in financial economics that states that asset prices reflect all available information
- Emergency Medical Hologram, a fictional computer program personified in the Doctor on Star Trek
- EMH Regional Medical Center, a hospital in Elyria, Ohio
- Extramedullary hematopoiesis, hematopoiesis occurring outside of the medulla of the bone
- Elizabeth Medal of Honour, an award given by the Royal Horticultural Society
