= Elyria City School District =

School district in Ohio

The Elyria City School district is a school district located in Elyria, Ohio. It consists of one high school, Three K-8 campuses, two K-4 elementary school buildings, and an early childhood education center. The Elyria City Schools maintains all public education and buildings.

== History ==
In 2014 a gay-straight alliance appeared at Elyria High School. As a result, a group of parents in the school district threatened to reject an item on the May 2014 voting ballot, a renewal levy.

In November 2016, residents of Elyria passed Issue 23, an unprecedented school bond issue valued at $140 million with the goal of rebuilding all the district's schools (excluding Elyria High School) as well as building a state-of-the-art athletic complex on the city's south side to replace the decaying Ely Stadium, which was built in 1927.

== Elyria City schools ==
=== High schools ===
- Elyria High School — 9-12

=== Middle schools (on new K-8 campuses) ===
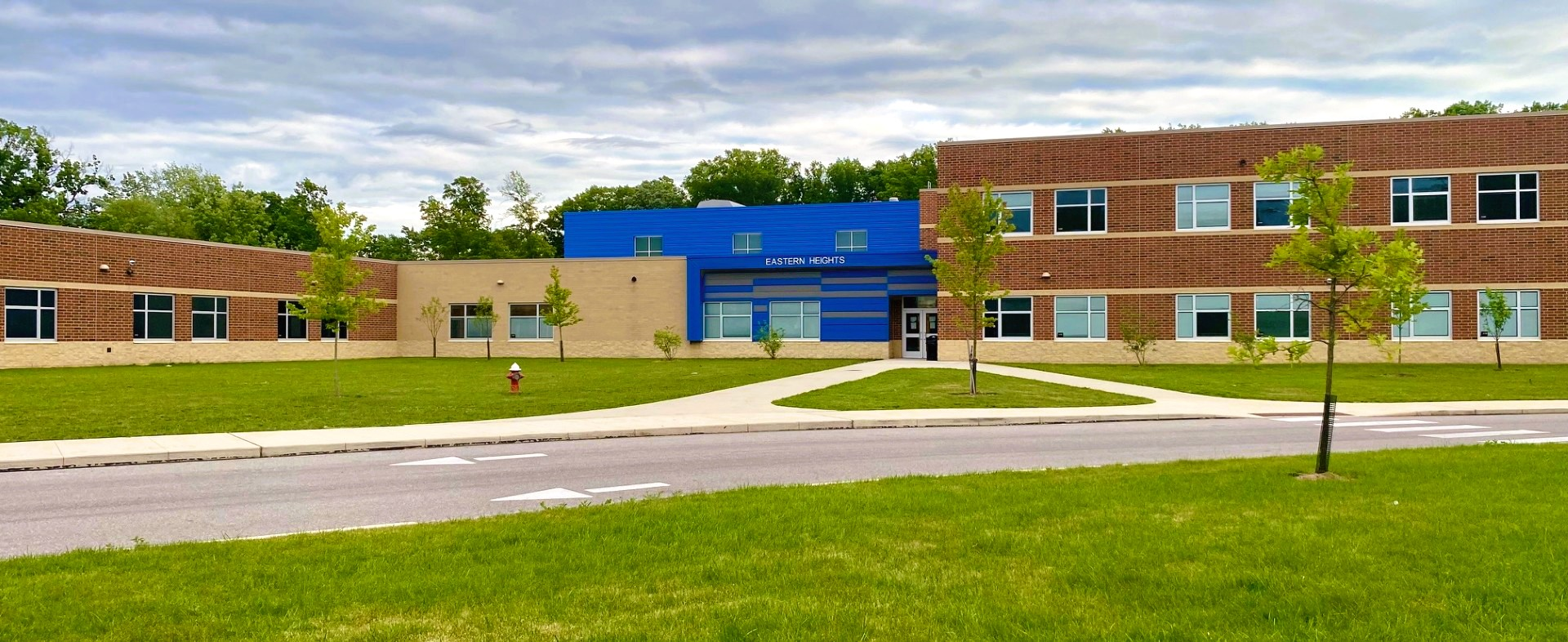
- Eastern Heights Middle School
  Northwood Middle School — 5-8
- Eastern Heights Middle School — 5-8
- Westwood Middle School — 5-8

=== Elementary schools ===
- Westwood Elementary School — K-4 (on Westwood K-8 campus)
- Northwood Elementary School - K-4 (on Northwood K-8 campus)
- Eastern Heights Elementary School - K-4 (on Eastern Heights K-8 campus)
- Ely Elementary School - K-4
- Hamilton Elementary School - K-4

=== Other schools ===
- Elyria Early Childhood Village (currently located at Central administrative offices, later to be relocated to former Crestwood building) - Preschool and Kindergarten

=== Closed schools ===
Due to tight budgets, the Elyria City Schools have closed several schools to reduce costs. Students have since been redirected to the closest school after closure.

- Elyria West High School (Closed in 1996)
- Eastgate Elementary School (Closed in 2010)
- Edison Elementary School(Closed in 1979)
- Cascade Elementary School (Closed in 2010)
- Jefferson Junior High School (Closed in 1996
- Erie Elementary School (Closed in 2009)
- Roosevelt Elementary School (Closed in 2010)
- Spring Valley High School (Closed in 2017)
- Franklin Elementary School (Closed in 2020)
- Prospect Elementary School (Closed in 2021)
- Oakwood Elementary School (Closed in 2021)
- McKinley Elementary School (Closed in 2021)
- Crestwood Elementary School (Closed in 2021)
- Eastern Heights Middle School (Closed in 2021)
