= Elyria, Ohio =

- City
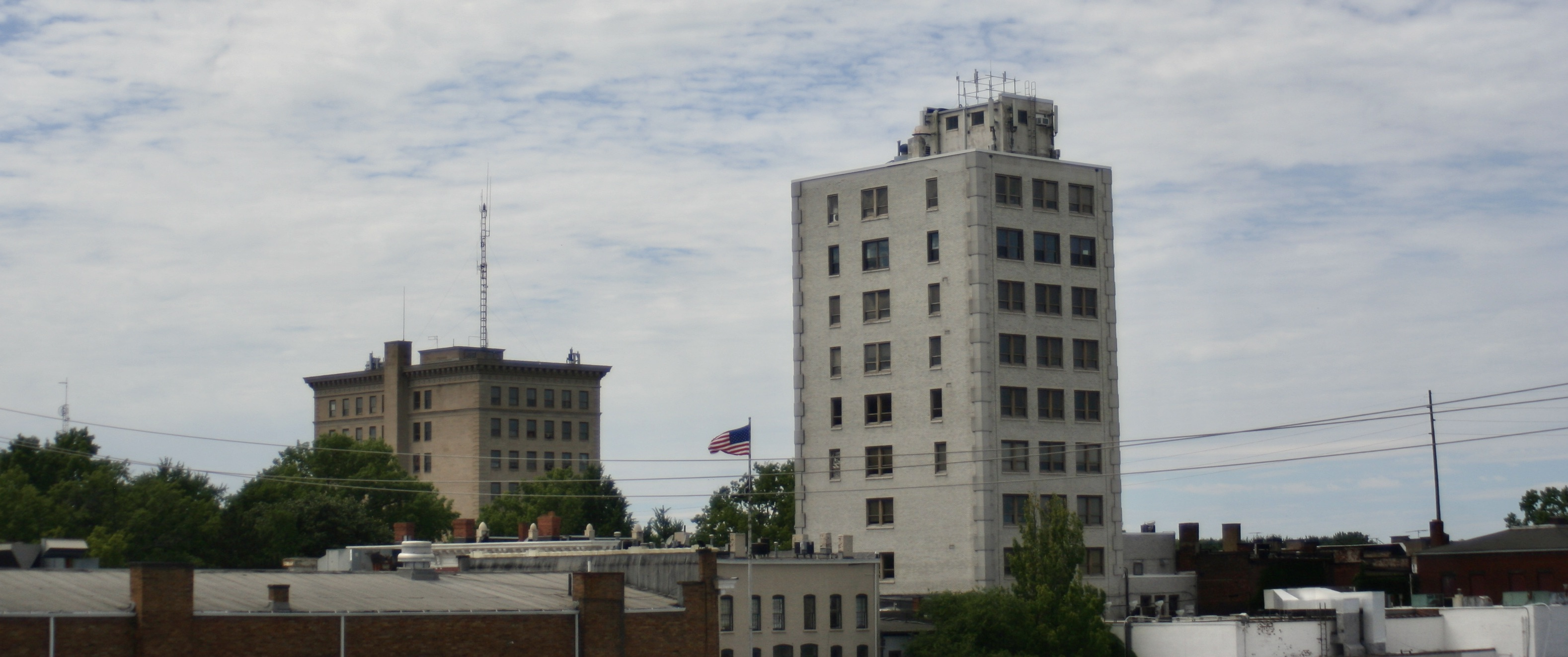
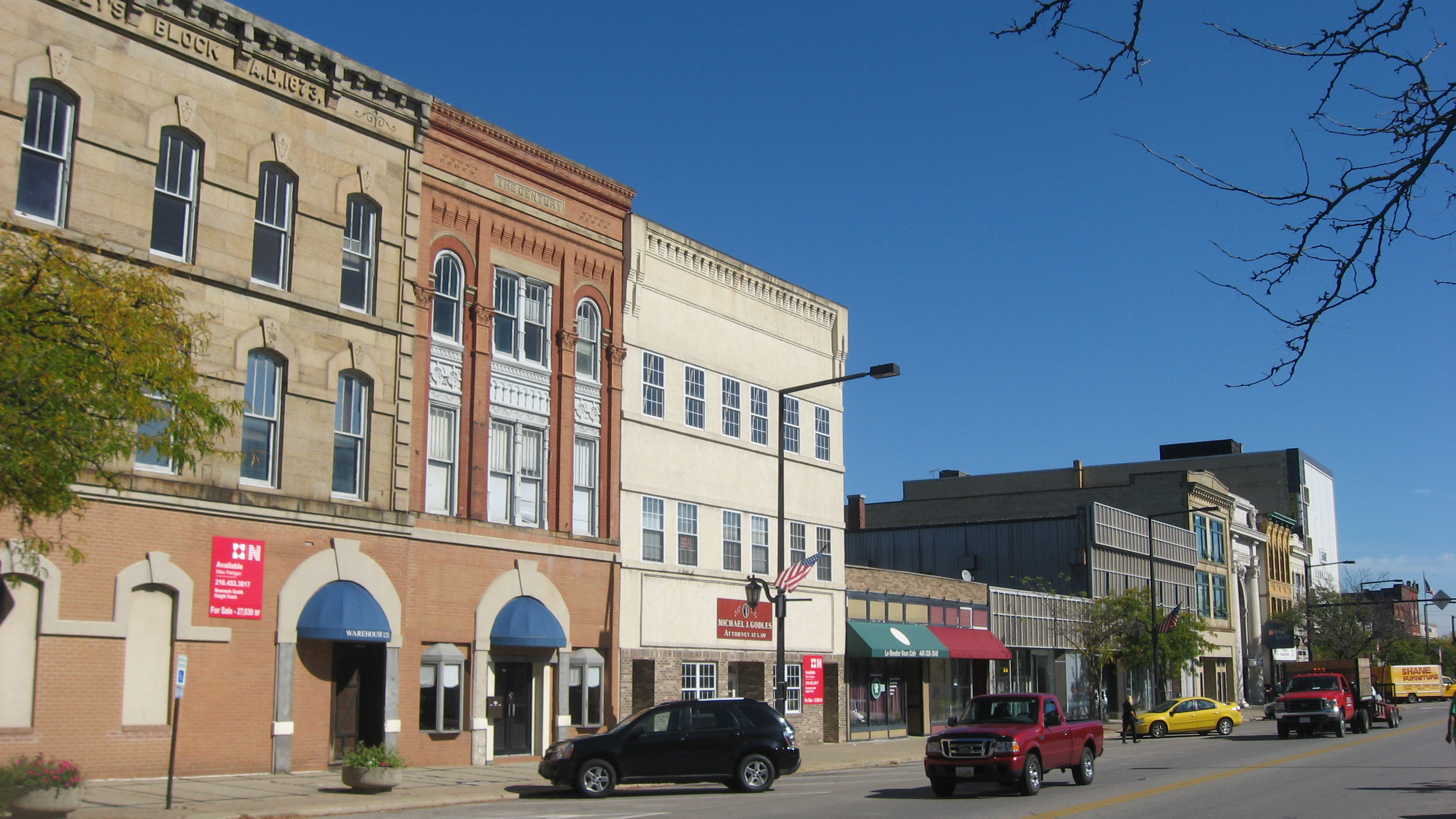
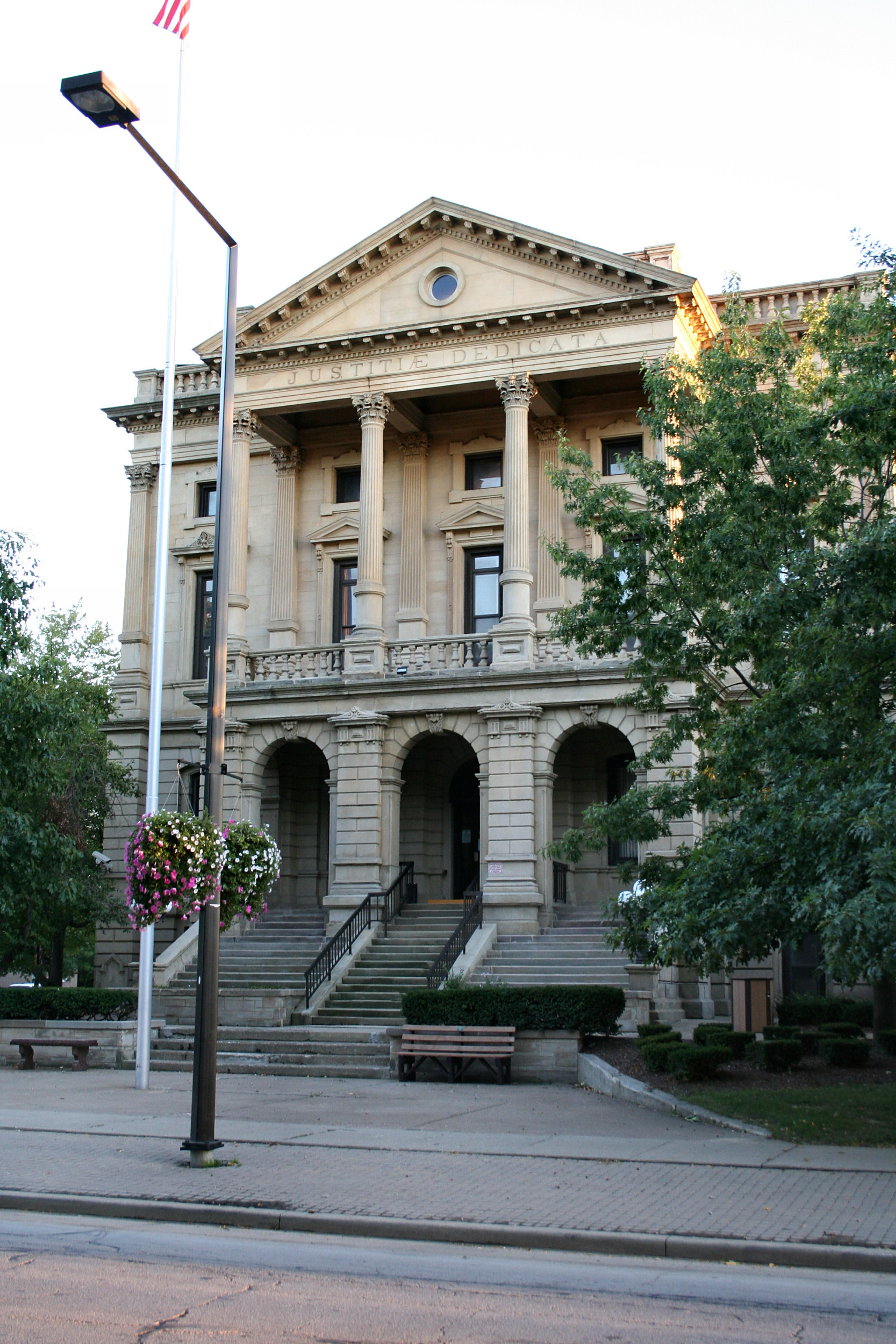
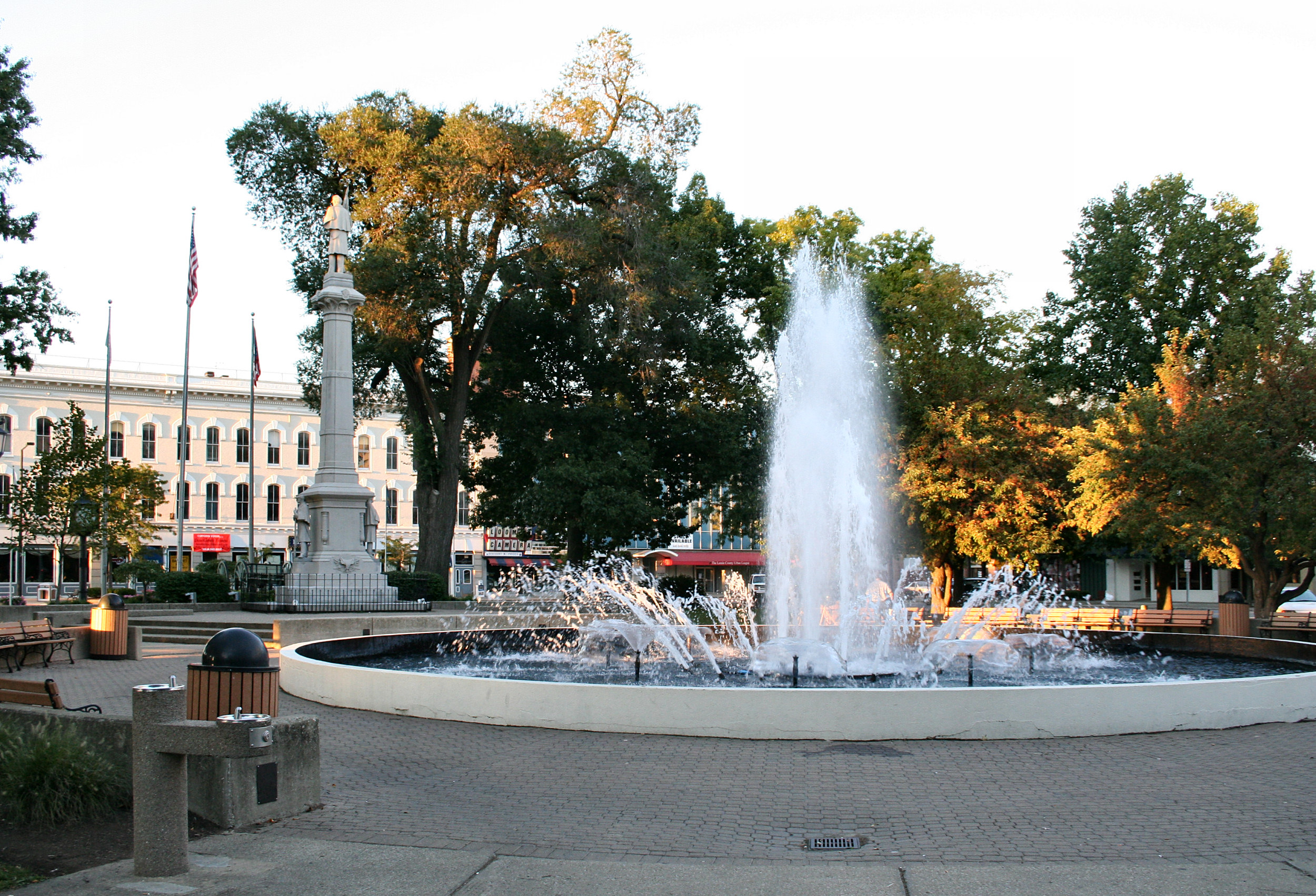
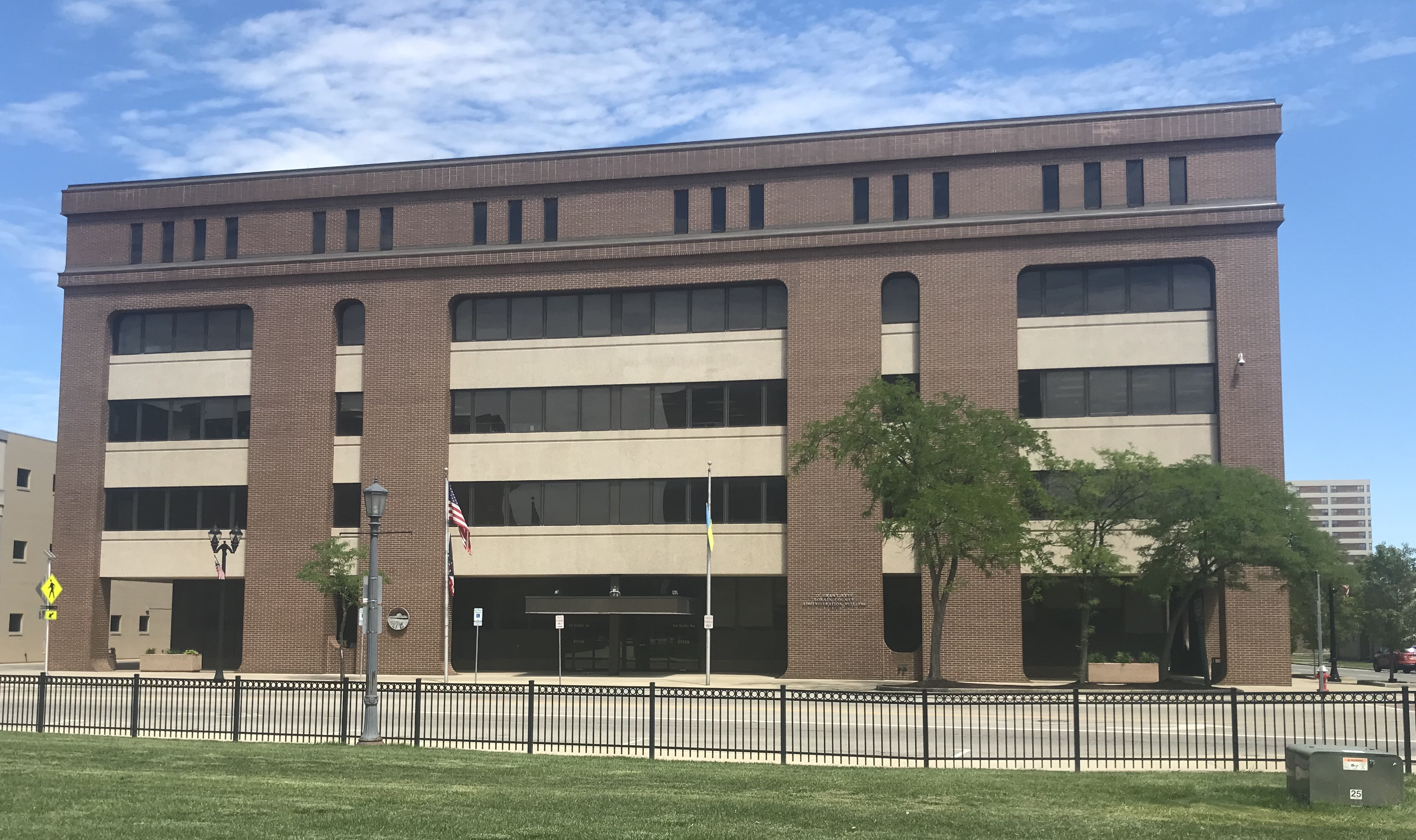
- Downtown Elyria Broad Street Old County Courthouse Ely Park Administration Building
- Interactive map of Elyria, Ohio
- Location within Ohio Location within the United States
- Coordinates: 41°22′24″N 82°06′46″W
- Country: United States
- State: Ohio
- County: Lorain
- Founded: March 1817

Government
  - Type: Mayor–council

Area
  - Total: 20.81 sq mi (53.89 km^{2})
  - Land: 20.55 sq mi (53.22 km^{2})
  - Water: 0.26 sq mi (0.67 km^{2})
- Elevation: 709 ft (216 m)

Population (2020)
  - Total: 52,656
  - Estimate (2023): 53,117
  - Density: 2,562.6/sq mi (989.42/km^{2})
- Time zone: UTC−5 (Eastern (EST))
  - Summer (DST): UTC−4 (EDT)
- ZIP codes: 44035, 44036, 44039, 44074
- Area code: 440
- FIPS code: 39-25256
- GNIS feature ID: 1086508
- Website: www.cityofelyria.org

Elyria (/əˈlɪəriə/ ə-LEER-ee-ə) is a city in Lorain County, Ohio, United States, and its county seat. The city is at the forks of the Black River in Northeast Ohio. The population was 52,656 at the 2020 census. Located 23 miles (37 km) southwest of Cleveland, it is part of the Cleveland metropolitan area and home to Lorain County Community College.

== Etymology ==
The city's name is derived from the surname of its founder, Heman Ely, and Illyria, the historical name used by ancient Greeks and Romans to refer to the western Balkans.

== History ==
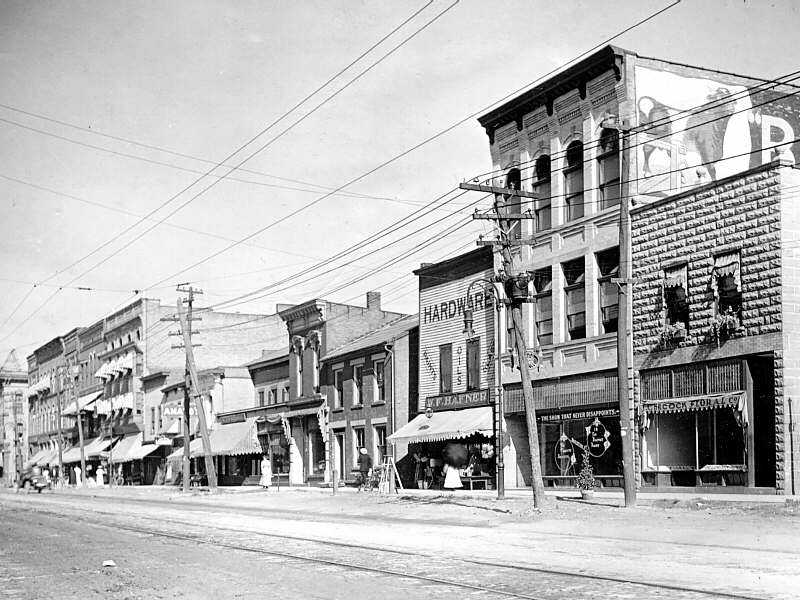
Broad Street in Elyria, c. 1915

The village of Elyria was founded in 1817 by Heman Ely, who built a log house, dam, gristmill, and sawmill on the village's site along the Black River. Ely began to build more houses to accommodate European-American settlers migrating to what was, at that time, within Huron County, Ohio.

By the turn of the 20th century, Elyria was a town of about 8,000. In 1908, Elyria Memorial Hospital was built. In the first half of the 20th century, the town developed some manufacturing, as well as a range of retail businesses.

In August 1967, Midway Mall was opened. It changed the local economy by attracting local businesses from the town center or causing so much competition they went out of business. Industrial restructuring meant that good jobs left the area, and poverty increased. Three major car plant closings in the area led to economic stagnation and joblessness in the 1970s and 1980s that affected numerous communities. The region was nicknamed "the Rustbelt", suggesting the decline of its former industries.

In the 1990s, Elyria experienced a minor revival with construction of some new roads and housing. It serves as a residential, suburban "bedroom community" for Cleveland, where new businesses and industries are developing with an increase in new jobs.

In the 2000s and 2010s, companies like Bendix and 3M moved their operations elsewhere. To prepare for this, voters passed Issue 6 in March 2016. Issue 6 increased the city's income tax by 0.5%. It was used to pay for police, parks, and fiber-optic Internet in the city. With the reconstruction of State Route 57 on the city's northwest side by Midway Mall, traffic flow was improved.

== Geography ==
Elyria is part of the Cleveland metropolitan area.

According to the United States Census Bureau, the city has a total area of 20.84 square miles (53.98 km^{2}), of which 20.57 square miles (53.28 km^{2}) is land and 0.27 square miles (0.70 km^{2}) is water.

The Black River flows through Elyria.

== Demographics ==
Historical population
Census	Pop.	Note	%±
1830	168		—
1840	936		457.1%
1850	1,482		58.3%
1860	1,613		8.8%
1870	3,038		88.3%
1880	4,777		57.2%
1890	5,611		17.5%
1900	8,791		56.7%
1910	14,825		68.6%
1920	20,474		38.1%
1930	25,633		25.2%
1940	25,120		−2.0%
1950	30,307		20.6%
1960	43,782		44.5%
1970	53,427		22.0%
1980	57,538		7.7%
1990	56,746		−1.4%
2000	55,953		−1.4%
2010	54,533		−2.5%
2020	52,656		−3.4%
2025 (est.)	53,634		1.9%

=== 2020 census ===
As of the 2020 census, Elyria had a population of 52,656, resulting in a population density of 2,562.59 people per square mile (989.42/km^{2}) and containing 24,904 housing units.

The median age was 40.3 years; 21.4% of residents were under the age of 18 and 18.6% of residents were 65 years of age or older. For every 100 females there were 90.7 males, and for every 100 females age 18 and over there were 87.3 males age 18 and over.

There were 22,954 households in Elyria, of which 25.8% had children under the age of 18 living in them. Of all households, 34.0% were married-couple households, 21.4% were households with a male householder and no spouse or partner present, and 35.4% were households with a female householder and no spouse or partner present. About 35.5% of all households were made up of individuals and 14.1% had someone living alone who was 65 years of age or older. Approximately 7.8% of the city's housing units were vacant; the homeowner vacancy rate was 2.0% and the rental vacancy rate was 9.0%.

99.5% of residents lived in urban areas, while 0.5% lived in rural areas.

Racial composition as of the 2020 census
Race	Number	Percent
White	38,012	72.2%
Black or African American	7,743	14.7%
American Indian and Alaska Native	142	0.3%
Asian	422	0.8%
Native Hawaiian and Other Pacific Islander	9	0.0%
Some other race	1,284	2.4%
Two or more races	5,044	9.6%
Hispanic or Latino (of any race)	4,403	8.4%

=== 2010 census ===
As of the census of 2010, there were 54,533 people, 22,400 households, and 14,093 families living in the city. The population density was 2,651.1 inhabitants per square mile (1,023.6/km^{2}). There were 25,085 housing units at an average density of 1,219.5 per square mile (470.9/km^{2}). The racial makeup of the city was 78.1% White, 15.5% African American, 0.3% Native American, 0.8% Asian, 1.2% from other races, and 4.1% from two or more races. Hispanic or Latino of any race were 4.9% of the population.

There were 22,400 households, of which 31.6% had children under the age of 18 living with them, 39.5% were married couples living together, 17.8% had a female householder with no husband present, 5.6% had a male householder with no wife present, and 37.1% were non-families. 30.5% of all households were made up of individuals, and 10.5% had someone living alone who was 65 years of age or older. The average household size was 2.39 and the average family size was 2.97.

The median age in the city was 38.1 years. 24.2% of residents were under the age of 18; 9% were between the ages of 18 and 24; 25.7% were from 25 to 44; 26.8% were from 45 to 64; and 14.3% were 65 years of age or older. The gender makeup of the city was 47.8% male and 52.2% female.

=== 2000 census ===
As of the census of 2000, there were 55,953 people, 22,409 households, and 14,834 families living in the city. The population density was 2,813.7 inhabitants per square mile (1,086.4/km^{2}). There were 23,841 housing units at an average density of 1,198.9 per square mile (462.9/km^{2}). The racial makeup of the city was 81.3% White, 14.2% African American, 0.27% Native American, 0.61% Asian, 0.02% Pacific Islander, 0.95% from other races, and 2.64% from two or more races. Hispanic or Latino of any race were 2.78% of the population.

There were 22,409 households, out of which 31.9% had children under the age of 18 living with them, 46.4% were married couples living together, 15.1% had a female householder with no husband present, and 33.8% were non-families. 28.5% of all households were made up of individuals, and 10.6% had someone living alone who was 65 years of age or older. The average household size was 2.46 and the average family size was 3.01.

In the city, the population was spread out, with 26.6% under the age of 18, 8.9% from 18 to 24, 30.2% from 25 to 44, 21.3% from 45 to 64, and 13.0% who were 65 years of age or older. The median age was 35 years. For every 100 females, there were 92.4 males. For every 100 females age 18 and over, there were 88.7 males.

The median income for a household in the city was $38,156, and the median income for a family was $45,846. Males had a median income of $34,898 versus $24,027 for females. The per capita income for the city was $19,344. About 9.5% of families and 11.7% of the population were below the poverty line, including 19.0% of those under age 18 and 7.5% of those age 65 or over.

== Economy ==
According to the city's 2021 Comprehensive Annual Financial Report, the top employers in the city were:

#	Employer	Employees
1	UH Elyria Medical Center	1,934
2	Lorain County	1,718
3	Lorain County Community College	1,609
4	Elyria City School District	971
5	Bendix Commercial Vehicle Systems LLC	747
6	Walmart	711
7	Ridge Tool	630
8	City of Elyria	461
9	Invacare Corporation	397
10	Parker Hannifin Corporation	349

== Education ==
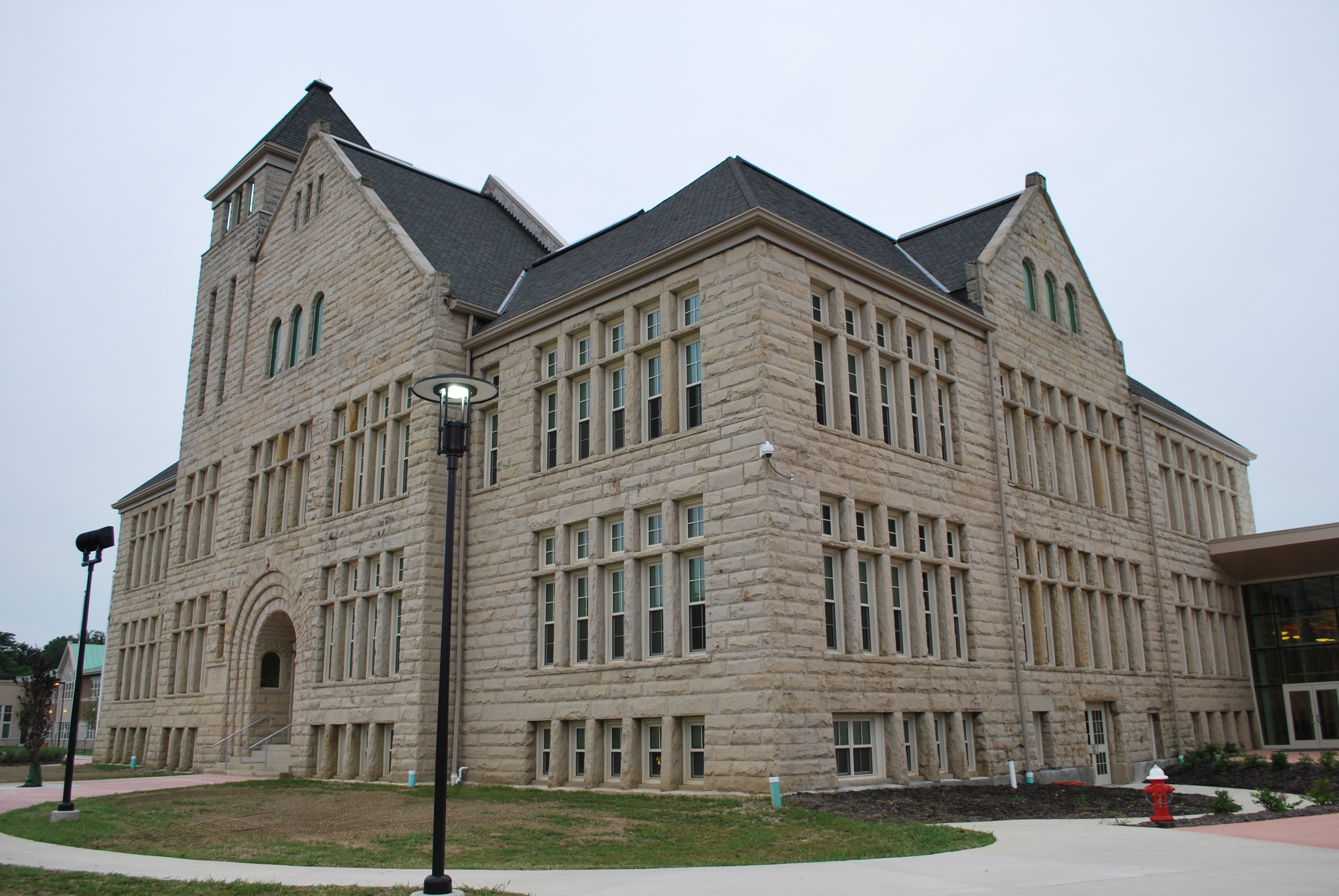
Elyria High School

Elyria's schools including Elyria High School. The Elyria City School District consisted at one time two high schools, five junior high schools, nine elementary schools, and one kindergarten school. Elyria is also home to Elyria Catholic High School. In 2010, Elyria High School was torn down for plans to build a new one. The building was fully completed during the 2012–2013 school year. Elyria is also home to the Open Door Christian School.

== Parks and recreation ==
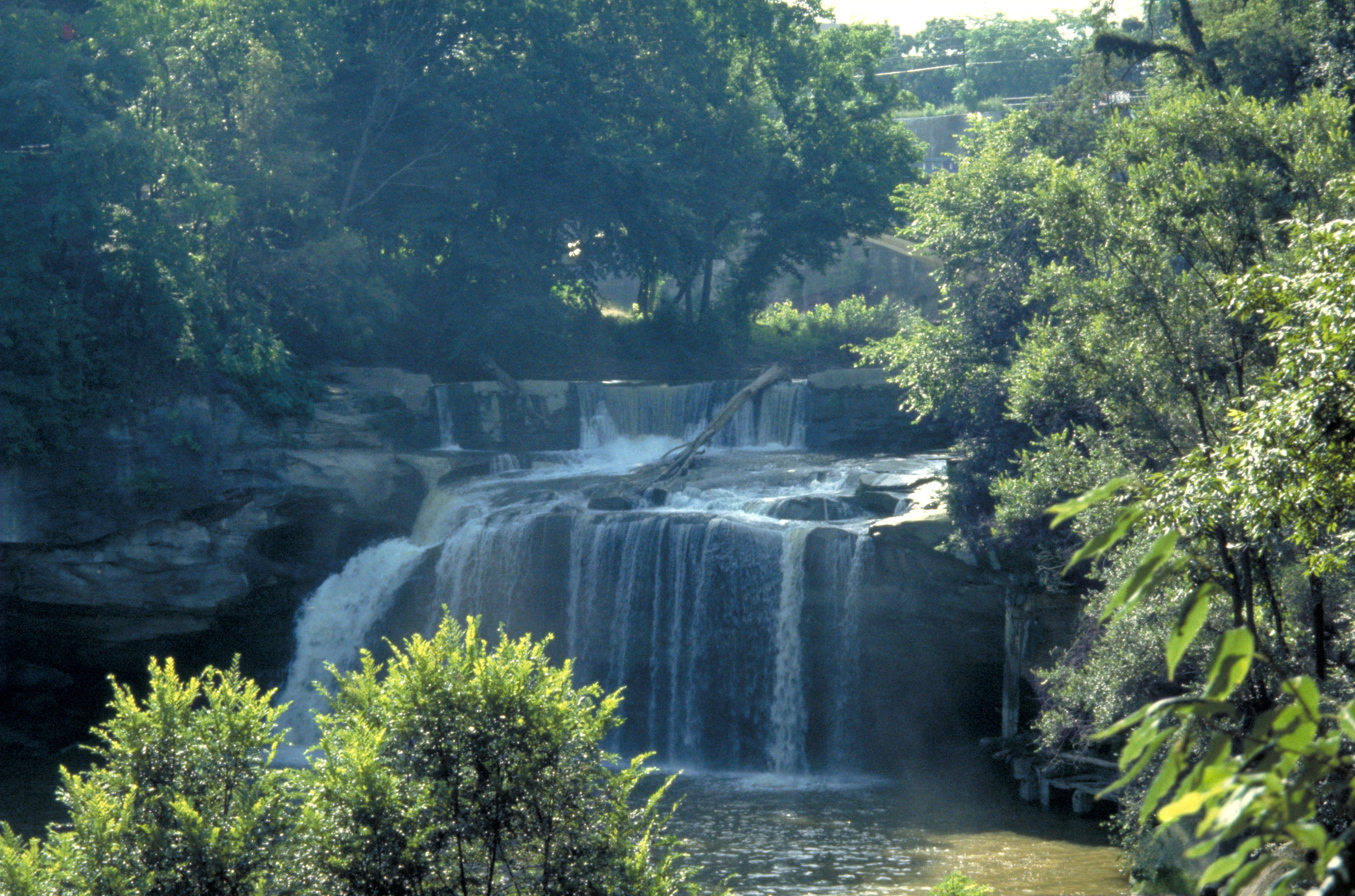
East Falls on the Black River in Cascade Park

Elyria has a large number of parks and recreational centers that include a variety of activities such as baseball and playground equipment. The four recreational centers are named after their locations: North, East, South, and West. They each include one or more baseball fields and at least two tennis courts.

There are two main parks, Cascade and Elywood, which are connected by an elevated pedestrian bridge in the center. Cascade Park is the largest and most popular park in Elyria. The park is located in a ravine carved by the same glaciers that created the Great Lakes. Cascade park has a large playground and a large hill that was previously used for seating at the 4th of July fireworks show, and was a popular spot for sledding during winter months. The park is centered along the Black River.

The park used to have three captive black bears, held in cages attached to a rock. Bears were featured in the park from 1920 to 1980.

== Infrastructure ==
=== Transportation ===
Lorain County Transit is based in Elyria. Elyria is served by many highways, including U.S. Route 20, the Ohio Turnpike, I-90, and State Routes 2, 113, 301 and 57.

The general airport for Elyria and Lorain is the Lorain County Regional Airport (located in New Russia Township), and Cleveland Hopkins International Airport is the nearest major airport. The Elyria Amtrak Station provides train transportation. Greyhound bus service is also available in the city.

=== Healthcare ===
Elyria is served by University Hospitals Elyria Medical Center.

== Notable people ==
- Sherwood Anderson, writer, lived here as business owner in early 1900s
- Wayne Barlow, composer (1912–1996)
- Alonzo Barnard (1817–1905), Presbyterian missionary and abolitionist
- T. D. Bancroft, temperance movement activist and academic
- Tianna Bartoletta, track and field athlete
- Walter Boron (b. 1949), physiologist
- Dwight Boyer, maritime reporter and historical journalist
- Keefe Brasselle, actor, title role of 1953 movie The Eddie Cantor Story
- Joseph M. Bryan, insurance executive and philanthropist
- Tony Curcillo, First Ohio State University quarterback under Woody Hayes
- Susan Topliff Davis, non-profit executive
- Thelma Drake, politician
- Arthur Lovett Garford, padded bicycle seat inventor and automobile manufacturer
- Nahum Ball Gates, Colonel and city mayor
- Doug Gillard, musician and songwriter, lead guitarist for Guided by Voices
- Vic Janowicz, former baseball and football player, 1950 Heisman Trophy winner
- Herbert Fisk Johnson Sr., CEO of S. C. Johnson & Son
- Samuel Curtis Johnson Sr., founder of S. C. Johnson & Son
- Anodea Judith, author, therapist, public speaker and expert on Chakra system
- James Kirkwood Jr., playwright, author and actor, lived here during childhood
- Eric Lauer, baseball player
- Lila Lee (1905–1973), actress from silent era; buried in Brookdale Cemetery in Elyria
- Robert Edwin Lee, playwright and lyricist
- Brianne McLaughlin, attended Elyria Catholic High School, ice hockey goaltender
- Maynard Mayo Metcalf, biologist (1868–1940)
- Les Miles, former LSU Tigers head football coach
- Haruki Nakamura, professional football player
- Danny Noble, professional football player for Tampa Bay Buccaneers
- Dav Pilkey, author of children's books
- Tim Rattay, professional football player
- Clayton Rawson, mystery writer, editor, and amateur magician
- Charles Roser, real estate developer, businessman and philanthropist
- Thomas O. Shores (1916–2002), longtime member of the Elyria City Council and first appointed Black mayor of the city
- Gary R. Stevenson, sports media executive
- Chad Szeliga, drummer for Breaking Benjamin
- Textbeak, DJ and record producer
- Steve Tovar, professional football player
- Charles Vinci Jr., weightlifter, Olympic champion in 1956
- Mark Winger, convicted murderer
- Norma Jean Wright, former lead singer for band Chic
- Victoria Wells Wulsin, doctor and international epidemiologist
