= Lamaar Thomas =

American football player (born 1990)

No. 81
- Position: Wide receiver

Personal information
- Born: April 23, 1990 (age 36); Fort Washington, Maryland, U.S.
- Listed height: 6 ft 0 in (1.83 m)
- Listed weight: 185 lb (84 kg)

Career information
- High school: Friendly (Fort Washington)
- College: New Mexico
- NFL draft: 2013: undrafted

Career history
- Denver Broncos (2013)*; Jacksonville Jaguars (2013); New Orleans VooDoo (2015)
- * Offseason or practice squad member only

Career NFL statistics
- Receptions: 2
- Receiving yards: 31
- Touchdowns: 0
- Stats at Pro Football Reference

Lamaar Edward Thomas (born April 23, 1990) is an American former professional football player who was a wide receiver in the National Football League (NFL). He was signed as an undrafted free agent by the Denver Broncos after the 2013 NFL draft. He played college football and ran track at the University of New Mexico, after transferring from Ohio State University, where he also participated in track and field.

== Professional career ==
=== Denver Broncos ===
Thomas signed with the Denver Broncos on April 28, 2013, after the 2013 NFL draft. He was released on August 31, 2013, during final cuts.

=== Jacksonville Jaguars ===
Thomas was signed to the Jacksonville Jaguars' practice squad on October 1, 2013. He was promoted to the active roster on December 20. He made his first career reception on December 22 in a game against the Tennessee Titans. The Jaguars released Thomas on August 25, 2014.

=== New Orleans VooDoo ===
Thomas was assigned to the New Orleans VooDoo of the Arena Football League (AFL), on March 6, 2015.

=== Career statistics ===
Year	Team	Games	Receptions	Targets	Receiving yards	Average yards per reception	Longest reception	Touchdowns	First downs	Fumbles	Fumbles lost
2013	JAX	2	2	3	31	15.5	18	0	2	0	0
Total	Total	2	2	3	31	15.5	18	0	2	0	0
