= University Hospitals Elyria Medical Center =

Coordinates: 41°21′59″N 82°05′50″W

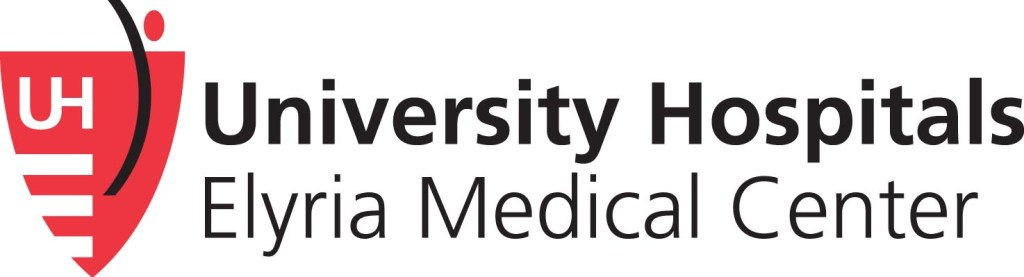

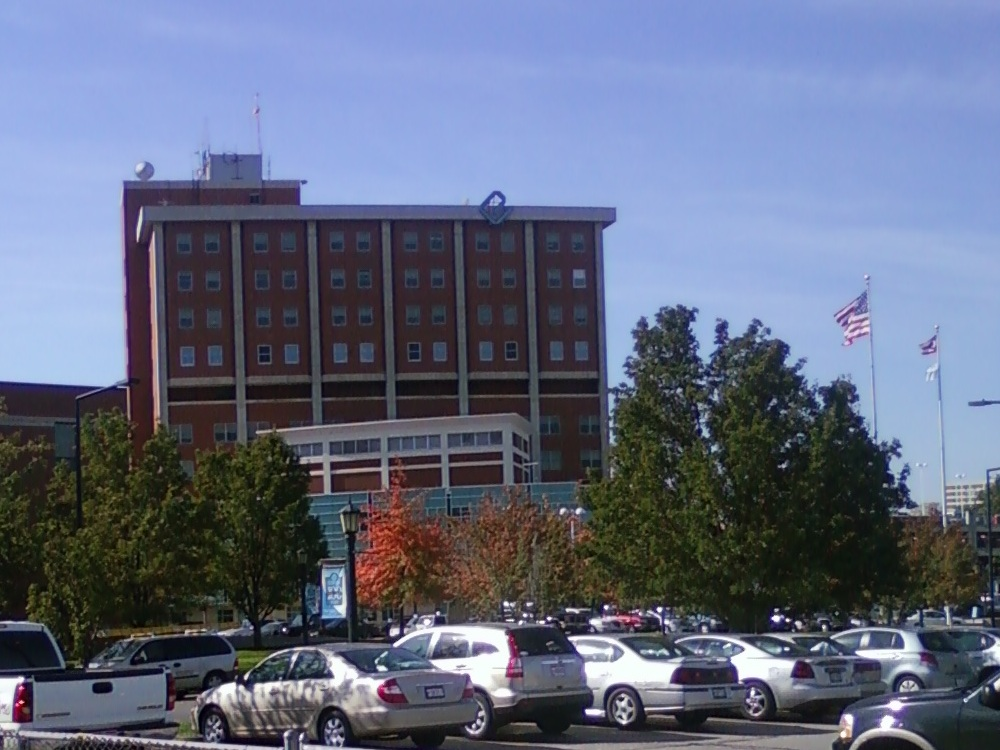

Geography
- Location: Elyria, Ohio, United States

Organization
- Care system: Private
- Type: Community
- Network: University Hospitals Health System

Services
- Beds: 387

History
- Opened: October 30, 1908

Links
- Website: http://www.uhelyria.org
- Lists: Hospitals in Ohio

University Hospitals Elyria Medical Center (UH Elyria) is a major community hospital in Elyria, OH. It is one of the community hospitals of the University Hospitals health system, with more than 28,000 physicians and employees across Northeast Ohio. UH Elyria Medical Center offers patients access to nationally renowned centers of excellence in cardiology, orthopedics, primary care and more close to home. For more than 110 years, UH Elyria Medical Center has been a cornerstone of the Lorain County, Ohio community and the hospital that local families trust for their care.

UH Elyria Medical Center is recognized for its cardiovascular services, including cardiac and vascular surgery. The hospital has heart catheterization and electrophysiology labs on site, along with protocols that enable physicians and healthcare teams to exceed national guidelines for lifesaving procedures for heart attack patients.

A 24/7 emergency department is available at UH Elyria, which also offers UH Rainbow Babies & Children's Hospital pediatric emergency services.

== History ==
In the early 1900s, records state that “there was no public place in Elyria for the care of the injured or sick.” A committee of prominent community members, including F.A. Smythe, Edgar.F. Allen and Reverend John P. Sala, met on May 28, 1907, to discuss the formation of a permanent hospital in the city. Little did they know that two days later one of the most tragic accidents in Elyria's history would occur.

On Memorial Day in 1907, streetcar No. 129 was heading down Middle Avenue toward downtown Elyria. The car was overloaded; some passengers were standing and sitting on a platform on the rear of the car. A second streetcar, No. 123, was following closely behind, trying to help alleviate the congestion. When No. 129 made a stop at 5th Street near Elyria High School, apparently the driver of car No. 123 did not notice – records indicate that he was observing a dead dog alongside the road. In broad daylight, the two streetcars crashed into each other, severing the legs and feet of many who were on the platform of the lead car.

With the lack of adequate hospital facilities in the area, the death toll from the accident reached nine; eight lost one or both legs, two were crippled for life and scores of others suffered from various injuries. Two of the fatalities included the children of Edgar “Daddy” Allen and Reverend Sala.

The grief-stricken community was more determined than ever to build a hospital, and on June 4, 1907, a hospital company was incorporated and a $100,000 building fund was underway. By the end of the campaign, the new hospital had exceeded its goal by $5,000. On November 17, 1907, more than 2,000 people gathered to witness the cornerstone laying by Mr. Allen and hear featured addresses by Reverend Sala and Mayor Clayton Chapman.

Less than one year later, Elyria Memorial Hospital opened its doors on October 30, 1908, with 36 beds.

Turning his personal tragedy – the loss of his son in the streetcar accident – into something positive, Edgar Allen not only worked to open Elyria Memorial Hospital but also the Gates Hospital for Crippled Children, in 1915. The facility was the first in the nation to be devoted exclusively to the care and treatment of crippled children.

Allen went on to form Ohio, National and International Societies for Crippled Children, and through his tireless efforts to raise funds and awareness, in 1934 the Easterseals (U.S.) was born. An Ohio Historical Marker commemorating Allen's work currently stands on the grounds of UH Elyria Medical Center.

In August 2013, EMH Healthcare announced plans to merge with University Hospitals.

In October 2018, UH Elyria Medical Center celebrated its 110-year anniversary.

== See also ==
- University Hospitals
