= Danny Noble =

American football player (born 1989)

No. 86, 88
- Position: Tight end

Personal information
- Born: March 30, 1989 (age 37); Elyria, Ohio, U.S.
- Listed height: 6 ft 6 in (1.98 m)
- Listed weight: 265 lb (120 kg)

Career information
- High school: Elyria
- College: Toledo
- NFL draft: 2012: undrafted

Career history
- Tampa Bay Buccaneers (2012–2013); Jacksonville Jaguars (2013)

Career NFL statistics
- Receptions: 2
- Receiving yards: 63
- Receiving average: 31.5
- Receiving touchdowns: 1
- Stats at Pro Football Reference

Danny Lee Noble Jr. (born March 30, 1989) is an American former professional football player who was a tight end in the National Football League (NFL) for the Tampa Bay Buccaneers and Jacksonville Jaguars. He played college football for the Toledo Rockets.

== College career ==
Noble played tight end at the University of Toledo.

== Professional career ==
=== Tampa Bay Buccaneers ===
Noble was an undrafted rookie for the Tampa Bay Buccaneers in 2012 and made the 53 man roster on August 31, 2012. On October 30, Noble was placed on injured reserve.

=== Jacksonville Jaguars ===
On October 9, 2013, the Jacksonville Jaguars signed Noble to their practice squad. He was promoted to their active roster on November 4. Noble recorded his first career reception on a 62–yard touchdown pass from Chad Henne against the Arizona Cardinals.

Noble was released by the Jaguars on May 2, 2014.
