= Stephane Milhim =

American football player (born 1990)

No. 61
- Position: Offensive guard

Personal information
- Born: November 20, 1990 (age 35); Pembroke Pines, Florida
- Listed height: 6 ft 4 in (1.93 m)
- Listed weight: 300 lb (136 kg)

Career information
- High school: Flanagan (Pembroke Pines, FL)
- College: Massachusetts
- NFL draft: 2013: undrafted

Career history
- Jacksonville Jaguars (2013)
- Stats at Pro Football Reference

Stephane Milhim (born November 20, 1990) is a former offensive guard who played college football at UMass.

== Early life ==
Milhim attended Charles W. Flanagan High School in Pembroke Pines, Florida. As an offensive lineman, he was a Sun-Sentinel All-County Honorable Mention who played in the Broward County North-South All-Star game, he was also named Team MVP as a senior.

== College career ==
Milhim signed a national letter of intent with UMass. After redshirting in 2008, he played in 40 games over the next four seasons, including starting 37 of them. Although primarily a tackle, Milhim showed versatility over his career by playing all five positions on the offensive line.

== Professional career ==
After being graded as a seventh-round pick in the 2013 NFL draft, Milhim went undrafted and signed with the Jacksonville Jaguars. He was placed on injured reserve on August 7, 2013.

Milhim was released by Jacksonville on May 2, 2014.
