= Elyria High School =

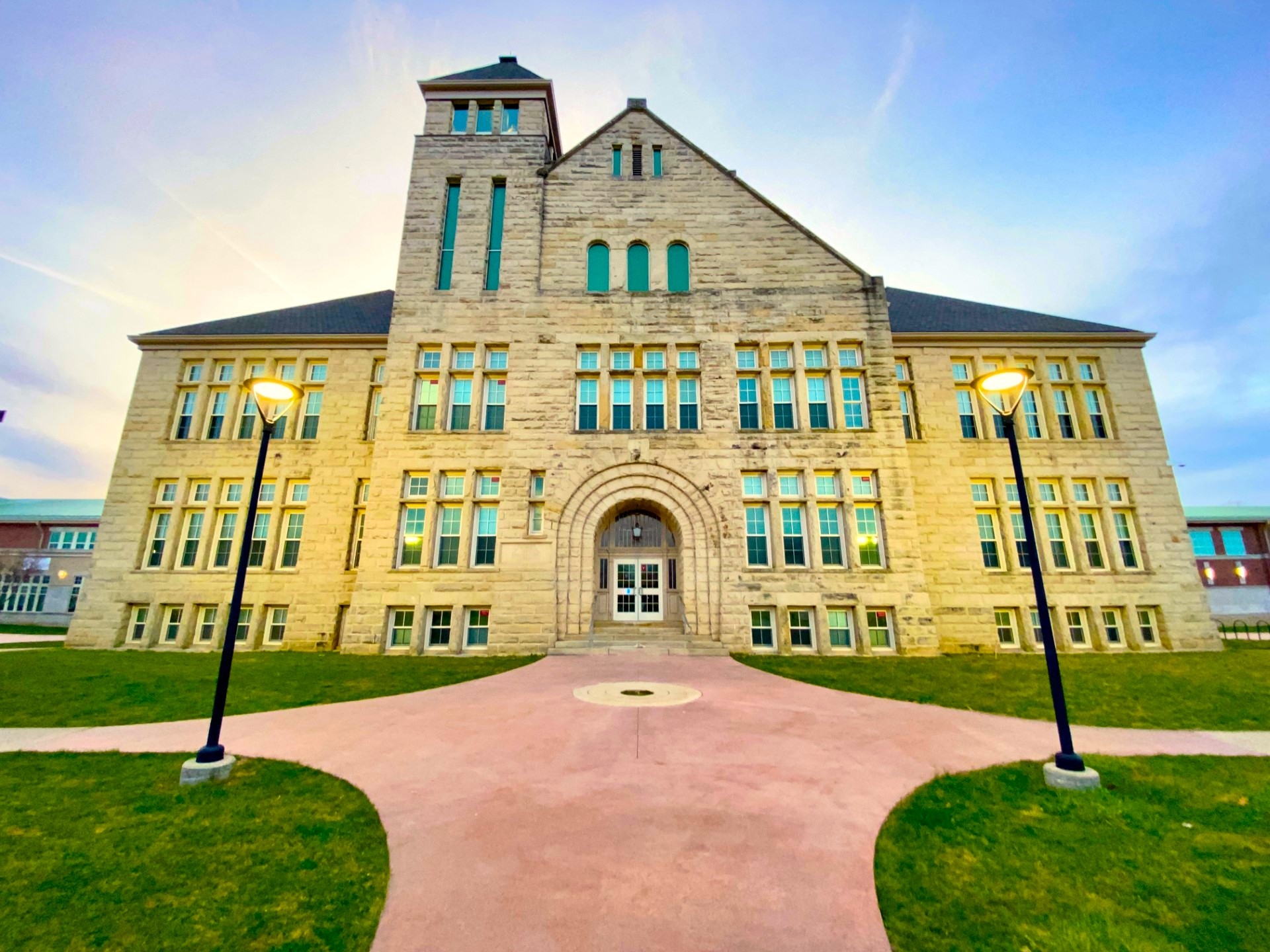

Location
- 601 Middle Avenue; Elyria, Ohio 44035; United States

Information
- Type: Public, Coeducational high school
- Established: 1830
- School district: Elyria City School District
- Superintendent: Ann Schloss
- Principal: Jodie Johnson
- Staff: 114.50 (FTE)
- Grades: 9-12
- Enrollment: 1,603 (2023-2024)
- Student to teacher ratio: 14.00
- Colors: Red, White, and Black
- Slogan: It's A Great Day To be A Pioneer!
- Fight song: Our Director
- Athletics conference: Greater Cleveland Conference
- Mascot: Petey the Pioneer
- Nickname: Pioneers
- Rival: Lorain High School, Elyria Catholic High School
- Accreditation: Ohio Department of Education
- Publication: The Page
- Newspaper: The Herald
- Yearbook: The Elyrian
- Website: elyriahigh.elyriaschools.org
- Elyria High School - Washington Building
- U.S. National Register of Historic Places
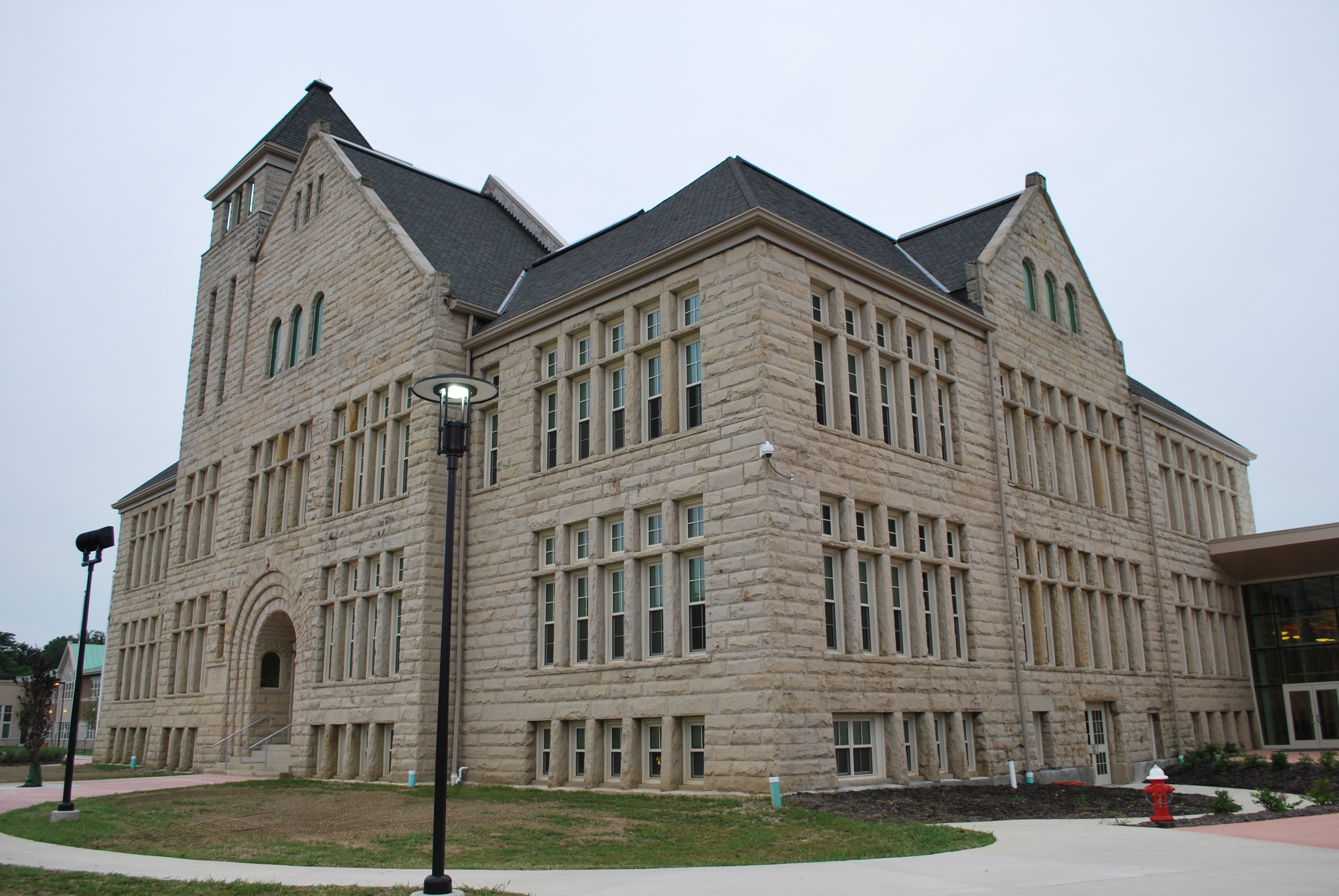
- Washington Building, 2012

- Location within Ohio
- Location: SW corner of 6th St. and Middle Ave., Elyria, Ohio
- Coordinates: 41°21′44″N 82°6′28″W
- Area: 3.6 acres (1.5 ha)
- Built: 1893
- Architect: Elah Terrell
- Architectural style: Romanesque
- MPS: Elyria MRA
- NRHP reference No.: 79002735
- Added to NRHP: August 13, 1979

Elyria High School is a public high school in Elyria, Ohio. Founded in 1830, it is notable for being the first chartered high school west of the Allegheny Mountains. Elyria High School athletic teams are known as the Pioneers and compete in the Southwestern Conference.

In 2007, Elyria passed Issue 7 allowing for a new high school to be built. All but the Washington building were demolished. A new athletic wing, academic building, cafeteria, and performing arts wing were all built, including a Performing Arts Center. The Washington Building was restored as well. The buildings were completed in December 2011.

== Buildings ==
Elyria High School has been through several reconstructions and additions throughout its history. The oldest section, the Washington Building, built in 1894, is on the National Register of Historic Places. The Technology building was built in 1913 with additions constructed in the 1920s. The red-brick Lincoln Building was built in the 1950s on the former site of Lincoln School which was completed in 1924. It connects the Washington and Technology buildings. The vocational building stands separate from the rest of the school. The last addition, including the big gym and auditorium, was completed in 1956. In 1996, Elyria West High School, the city's former second high school, was closed down and the students were consolidated for the start of the 1996-1997 school year. Two separate facilities spread across the city are used for athletics, Pioneer Fields and Ely Stadium, which host soccer and football, baseball, track, and various other athletics and events respectively. With the passage of Issue 23 in November 2016, a new $14 million dollar athletic complex will be built on the current location of Ely Stadium, including soccer, baseball, softball, and various other athletic fields, as a new elementary school will be built at the location of the current Pioneer Fields.

=== Reconstruction ===
Due to Elyria High School's age and extremely poor condition that posed a safety hazard to staff and students, it has been reconstructed, having been supported by an issue known as Issue 7. Issue 7 was passed on May 8, 2007 after three previous attempts. The new building was constructed adjacent to the old high school and connects with the historical Washington Building, which was also renovated. The project cost nearly $70 million and spans two city blocks and is 300,000 square feet (28,000 m^{2}). The new school was built in phases, with phase 1 which included the main academics center being scheduled for conclusion by the beginning of the 2010-2011 school year. Following phase 1, demolition of the old building and construction of the gymnasiums and cafeteria began on the grounds of the old building and is connected to the new building and the entire construction project concluded for the 2011-2012 school year. The building was fully completed during the 2012-2013 school year, with the completion of the rooms for the JROTC program, located on the first floor of the Washington Building.

== Notable alumni ==
- Tony Curcillo, football player
- Thelma Drake, politician
- Chase Farris, football player
- Arthur Garford, Class of 1875, inventor of padded bicycle seat
- Doug Gillard, Class of 1984, musician
- Vic Janowicz, baseball and football player, 1950 Heisman Trophy winner
- James Kirkwood, Jr., author
- Lester Lynch, Class of 1987, opera singer
- Tianna Madison, track athlete, 3-time Olympic gold medalist, 2-time world champion
- Les Miles, head football coach of Kansas University Jayhawks
- Danny Noble, football player
- Dasan Robinson, MLS defender, Chicago Fire
- Walter Rock, Class of 1959, pro football player, San Francisco 49ers, Washington Redskins
- Chad Szeliga, drummer from band Breaking Benjamin, and current drummer of Black Label Society
- Harrison Williams, Class of 1890, entrepreneur

== State championships ==
- Wrestling - 1973
- Softball – 2002, 2009, 2017
- Girls track and field – 2003
