= Marion E. Warner =

American poet and short story writer (1839–1918)

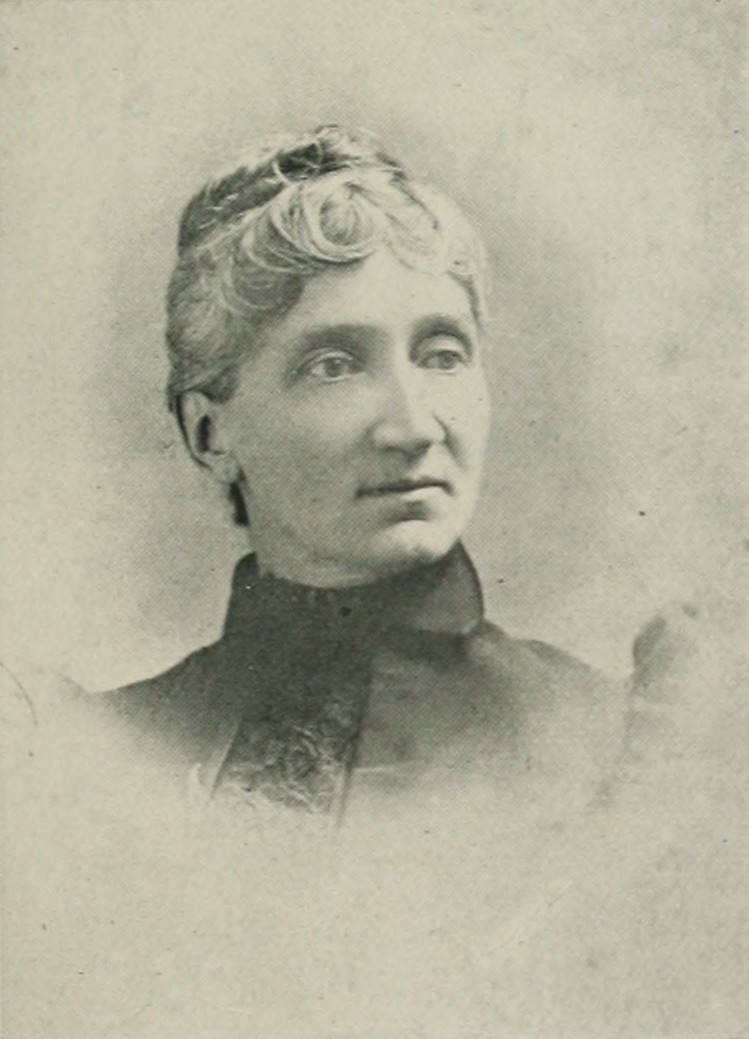
- Portrait from A Woman of the Century
- Born: Marion E. Knowlton; June 15, 1839; Geneva, Ohio, U.S.
- Died: May 19, 1918 (aged 78); Elyria, Ohio, U.S.
- Resting place: New Darby Cemetery, Unionville Center, Union County, Ohio, U.S.
- Occupation: writer
- Spouses: Henry Gustavus SeCheverll (died 1871); Elbridge Oliver Warner (m. 1874; died 1884)
- Children: 1
- Writing career
- Pen name: M. E. W.
- Genres: poetry, short stories

Marion E. Warner (pen name, M. E. W.; née, Knowlton; after first marriage, SeCheverll; after second marriage, Warner; June 15, 1839 – 1918) was an American poet and short story writer. Her work, praised for its literary merit, was published by the press rather than compiled in book form.

== Early life ==
Marion (or Marrion) E. Knowlton was born in Geneva, Ashtabula County, Ohio, June 15, 1839. She was a lifelong resident of the Western Reserve of Ohio, near Lake Erie. For a time, her home was in Unionville, Lake County, Ohio. She was a lineal descendant of the original settlers of the Dutch colony of New Netherland and of those who participated in the American Revolutionary War.

Her father, Charles B. Knowlton (1810–1870), was born in Brookfield, Massachusetts, a son of Jonathan Knowlton, and a descendant of Captain William Knowlton, who sailed in his own ship from England, but died before he reached the U.S. His family settled in Ipswich, Massachusetts, in 1635. Jonathan Knowlton while living in Canada, was pressed into the British service under General McKenzie, but made his escape and served in the colonial army during the Revolutionary war. Charles Knowlton came to Ohio when a young man, and here married Harriet Evans (1818–1885), who was born in Geneva, Ashtabula county, a daughter of Ora and Sally Snediker Evans, who came from Schoharie County, New York, to the Western Reserve in 1812. Sally Snediker was a direct descendant of John Snediker, the original patron of an estate in Brooklyn, New York. Ora Evans served in the War of 1812, being at the engagement at Sackets Harbor, New York and in many others. He settled north of Unionville, on the county line (Ashtabula County/Lake County), where he erected a house. He later removed to Harpersfield Township, Ashtabula County, Ohio, where he resided until his death. His father, Ora Evans Sr., and his grandfather, Moses Evans, were both soldiers in the Revolutionary war, Moses Evans' wife being very active during the war, carrying dispatches to and from many points, on one occasion shooting the horse of a pursuer. At the close of the war, she and her husband settled on the old battlefield of Harlem Heights, where she died at the age of 108 years. Some time after his marriage, Charles Knowlton returned to his early home in North Brookfield, Massachusetts, and died there about 1840, leaving three children, namely: Ora E., who served in the American Civil War and died at the age of 45 years; Captain Emery E., an attorney in Canfield, Ohio, served in the Civil war and died at the age of 37; and Marion E.

== Career ==
While relatively young, Warner demonstrated a literary instinct, and developed a taste for standard literature. At the age of 18, her first story was published in the Cleveland Gleaner, followed by others at frequent intervals. Her stories appeared in the local papers, giving evidence of more than average ability and attracting attention. About the same time, she began to write poetry.

Warner was afflicted with oft-recurring and severe illness. Widowed twice, a large portion of her time was spent in overseeing her second husband's estate and caring for their daughter. In addition, Warner made time for literary pursuits. She contributed a collection of poems, published from time to time, generally over the signature "M. E. W.".

== Personal life ==
Marion's first husband was Henry Gustavus SeCheverll (1834-1871).

On March 18, 1874, in Lake County, Ohio, she married Elbridge Oliver Warner (1811–1884), being his third wife. They had one child, a daughter, Marjorie Olivia Warner (1875–1949). Marjorie was educated in instrumental music and voice culture.

Warner was a member of St. Michael's Episcopal church. She took an active interest in the work of the YWCA, and was likewise interested in genealogical and historical matters.

Marion Warner died in Elyria, Ohio, May 19, 1918.
