= Saybrook-on-the-Lake, Ohio =

- Census-designated place
- Location within Ohio Location within the United States
- Coordinates: 41°52′24″N 80°52′26″W
- Country: United States
- State: Ohio
- County: Ashtabula
- Township: Saybrook

Area
  - Total: 3.11 sq mi (8.06 km^{2})
  - Land: 3.11 sq mi (8.06 km^{2})
  - Water: 0 sq mi (0.00 km^{2})
- Elevation: 627 ft (191 m)

Population (2020)
  - Total: 1,050
  - Density: 337.4/sq mi (130.28/km^{2})
- Time zone: UTC-5 (Eastern (EST))
  - Summer (DST): UTC-4 (EDT)
- ZIP Code: 44004 (Ashtabula)
- Area code: 440
- FIPS code: 39-70655
- GNIS feature ID: 2812808

Saybrook-on-the-Lake is an unincorporated community and census-designated place (CDP) on the shore of Lake Erie in Ashtabula County, Ohio, United States. It was first listed as a CDP prior to the 2020 census. As of the 2020 census, Saybrook-on-the-Lake had a population of 1,050.

The CDP is in northern Ashtabula County, in the northwest corner of Saybrook Township. It is bordered to the north by Lake Erie, to the west by Geneva Township, and to the east by Ohio State Route 45. State Route 531 is the main road through the community, paralleling the lakeshore and leading east-northeast 5 miles (8 km) to Ashtabula Harbour and west-southwest 4 miles (6 km) to Geneva-on-the-Lake. State Route 45 leads south 3.5 miles (5.6 km) to U.S. Route 20 in Saybrook Township and 6.5 miles (10.5 km) to Interstate 90 at Austinburg .

== Demographics ==
Historical population
| Census | Pop. | Note | %± |
|---|---|---|---|
| 2020 | 1,050 | | — |
U.S. Decennial Census
