= Orrin Hickok =

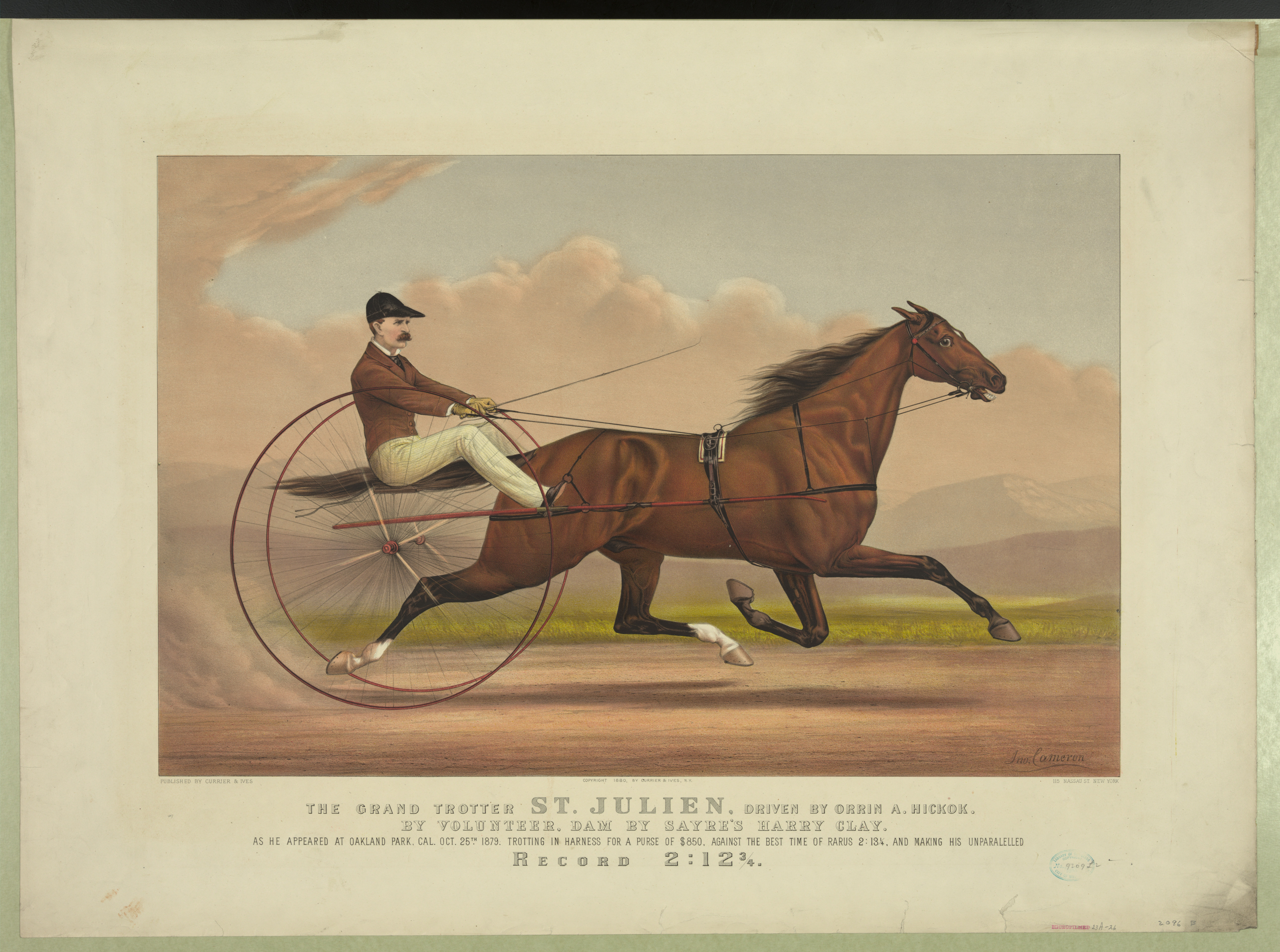
Orrin Hickok driving "St. Julien"; Currier and Ives print from painting by John Cameron

Orrin A. Hickok (born Harpersfield Township, Ashtabula County, Ohio, 1838; died Cleveland, Ohio, November 9, 1903) was an American harness racing owner and driver. He was best known as the part-owner, trainer, and driver of "St. Julien"; who in 1879 and 1880 twice held the world record for the mile.

== Early life ==
Hickok was the oldest child of farmer Hiram Hickok (1802–1891) and his wife Lydia Edmonds Hickok (1816–1887). Hickok's father was a noted horseman, and Hickok rode thoroughbreds until he grew too heavy. Around 1855 Hickok moved to Fond du Lac, Wisconsin where he operated a successful racing stable.

== Harness racing career ==
About 1870 he moved to New York City and purchased his first star trotter, "Lucy". By 1874 he was racing "Judge Fullerton", a famous horse of the day. In 1876 he and partner R. F. Morrow purchased the gelding "St. Julien", a former milk cart horse, from James Galway, who had begun training it for the track. After three years of training, on October 25, 1879, in Oakland, California he drove "St. Julien" to a new world record of 2' 12 1/2" for a mile track, with General Grant in the audience. A year later, they reclaimed a share of the record at Hartford, Connecticut with a time of 2' 11 1/4" (shared with the mare Maud S.). This record stood until "Maud S." lowered the time again the following year.

Hickok remained a prominent figure in harness racing for several decades thereafter. He retired from driving by early 1898, but remained active as an owner. In the summer of 1902 he was stricken with "swelling of the brain" at a racing meet in Cleveland and never recovered.

Hickok never married and left no descendants.

== Legacy ==
Nicknamed "Talleyrand of the Turf", Hickok was nationally known and the subject of national press attention. Driving "St. Julien" and other horses, he was the subject of many paintings and prints. He was elected to the Harness Racing Hall of Fame in 1959.

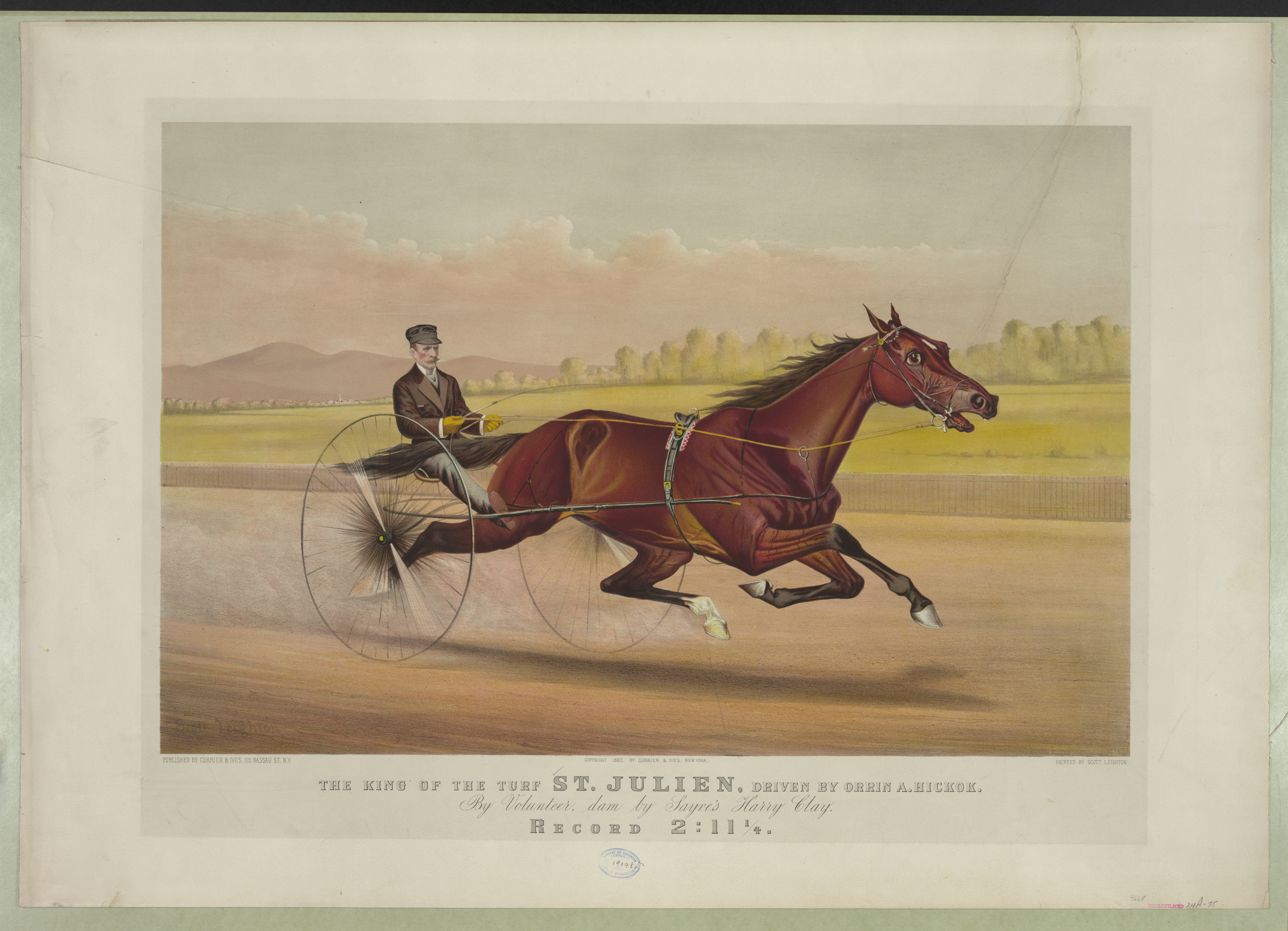
Another image of Hickok and "St. Julien", (artist Scott Leighton)
