= North Madison, Ohio =

- Census-designated place
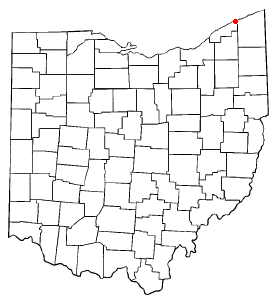
- Location of North Madison, Ohio
- Coordinates: 41°49′47″N 81°03′03″W
- Country: United States
- State: Ohio
- County: Lake
- Township: Madison

Area
  - Total: 3.91 sq mi (10.12 km^{2})
  - Land: 3.91 sq mi (10.12 km^{2})
  - Water: 0 sq mi (0.00 km^{2})
- Elevation: 604 ft (184 m)

Population (2020)
  - Total: 8,188
  - Density: 2,095.5/sq mi (809.07/km^{2})
- Time zone: UTC-5 (Eastern (EST))
  - Summer (DST): UTC-4 (EDT)
- ZIP code: 44057
- Area code: 440
- FIPS code: 39-56812
- GNIS feature ID: 2393153

North Madison is a census-designated place (CDP) comprising the unincorporated communities of Redbird and Madison-on-the-Lake in Lake County, Ohio, United States. The population was 8,188 at the 2020 census. The area uses a mailing address of "Madison", with the ZIP Code 44057.

== Geography ==
The North Madison CDP is located in northeastern Lake County along the shore of Lake Erie in the northern part of Madison Township. The area known as Redbird is in the western part of the CDP, and Madison-on-the-Lake is in the eastern part. The CDP is located 1 mile (1.6 km) north of the unincorporated community of North Madison and U.S. Route 20. It is 4 miles (6 km) north of the village of Madison, 7 miles (11 km) northwest of Geneva, and 9 miles (14 km) northeast of Perry.

According to the United States Census Bureau, the CDP has a total area of 3.9 square miles (10.1 km^{2}), all of it land.

== Demographics ==
Historical population
Census	Pop.	Note	%±
2020	8,188		—
U.S. Decennial Census

As of the 2010 census of 2010, there were 8,547 people, 3,323 households, and 2,306 families residing in the CDP. The population density was 2,120.2 inhabitants per square mile (818.6/km^{2}). There were 3,323 housing units at an average density of 852.5 per square mile (329.2/km^{2}). The racial makeup of the CDP was 98.4% White, 0.9% African American, 0.8% Native American, 0.38% Asian, 0.6% from other races, and 0.6% from two or more races. Hispanic or Latino of any race were 1.8% of the population.

There were 3,077 households, out of which 32.5% had children under the age of 18 living with them, 50.7% were married couples living together, 12.5% had a female householder with no husband present, and 30.6% were non-families. 24.8% of all households were made up of individuals, and 8.6% had someone living alone who was 65 years of age or older. The average household size was 2.57 and the average family size was 3.05.

In the CDP, the population was spread out, with 25.8% under the age of 18, 8.6% from 18 to 24, 27.0% from 25 to 44, 27.6% from 45 to 64, and 12.0% who were 65 years of age or older. The median age was 38.5 years. For every 100 females, there were 97.1 males. For every 100 females age 18 and over, there were 94.5 males.

The median income for a household in the CDP was $44,535, and the median income for a family was $48,709. Males had a median income of $40,207 versus $23,689 for females. The per capita income for the CDP was $18,473. About 4.8% of families and 5.9% of the population were below the poverty line, including 7.4% of those under age 18 and 4.8% of those age 65 or over.
