= Geneva, Ohio =

City in Ohio, US

- City
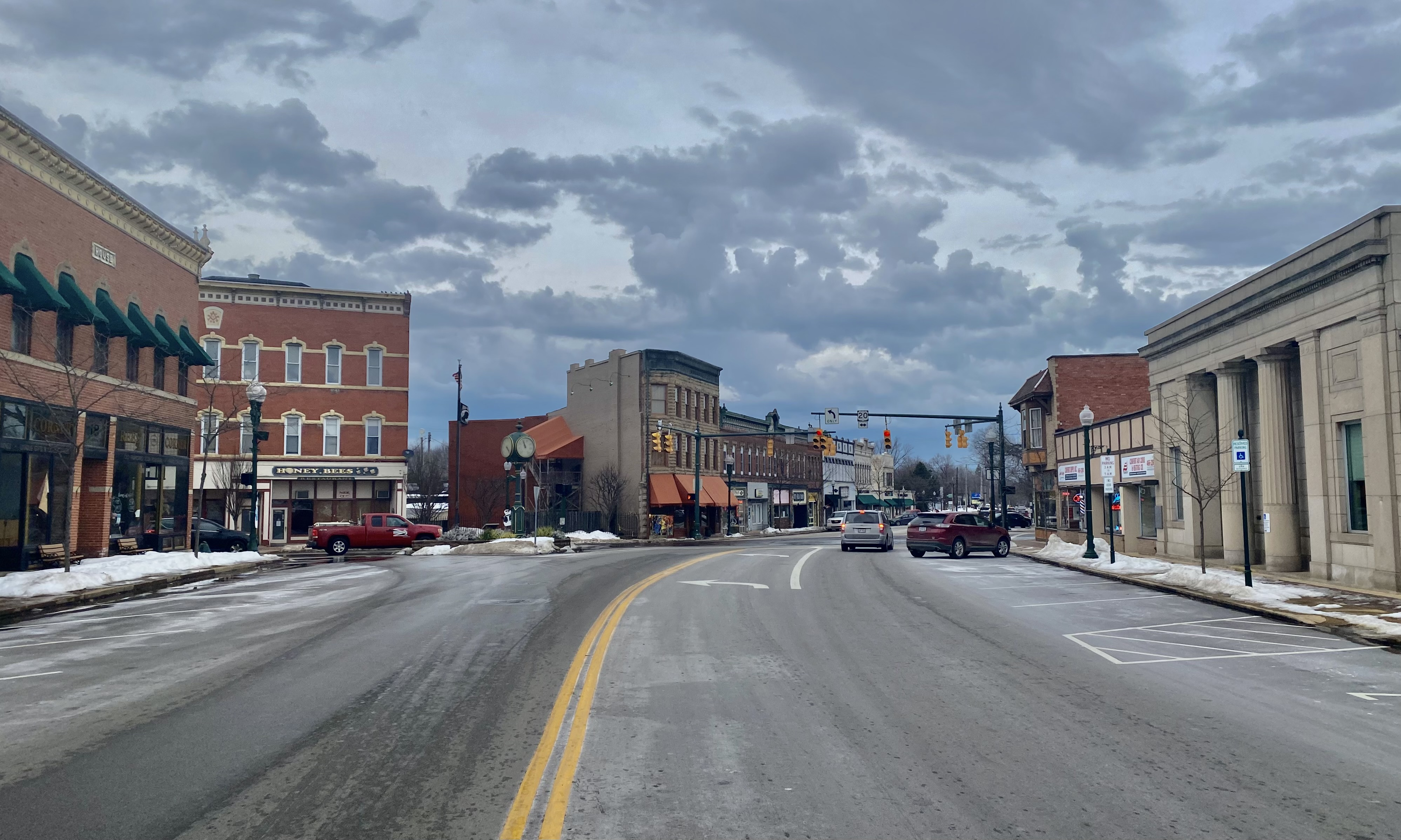
- Downtown Geneva

- Seal

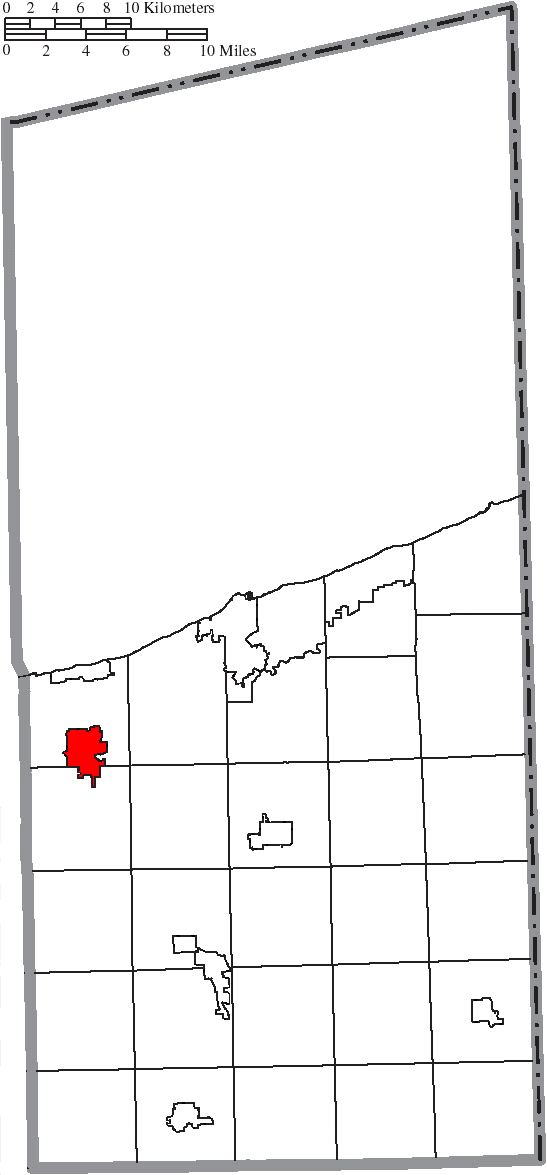
- Location of Geneva in Ashtabula County

- Location within Ohio Location within the United States
- Coordinates: 41°48′02″N 80°56′46″W
- Country: United States
- State: Ohio
- County: Ashtabula
- Township(s): Geneva, Harpersfield
- Area first settled: 1805
- City first settled: 1816
- Incorporated: 1866 as village 1958 as city
- Named for: Geneva, New York

Government
  - Type: Council–manager

Area
  - Total: 4.08 sq mi (10.56 km^{2})
  - Land: 4.08 sq mi (10.56 km^{2})
  - Water: 0 sq mi (0.00 km^{2})
- Elevation: 673 ft (205 m)

Population (2020)
  - Total: 5,924
  - Estimate (2023): 5,866
  - Density: 1,452/sq mi (560.8/km^{2})
- Time zone: UTC-5 (EST)
  - Summer (DST): UTC-4 (EDT)
- ZIP code: 44041
- Area code: 440
- Demonym: Genevan
- FIPS Code: 39-29610
- GNIS Feature ID: 2394874
- Website: www.genevaohio.gov

Geneva is a city in northwestern Ashtabula County, Ohio, United States. The population was 5,924 at the 2020 census. It is part of the Cleveland metropolitan area, 44 miles (71 km) northeast of Cleveland. The area which would become Geneva was originally settled in 1805, and was incorporated as a city in 1958. It is named after Geneva, New York.

== History ==
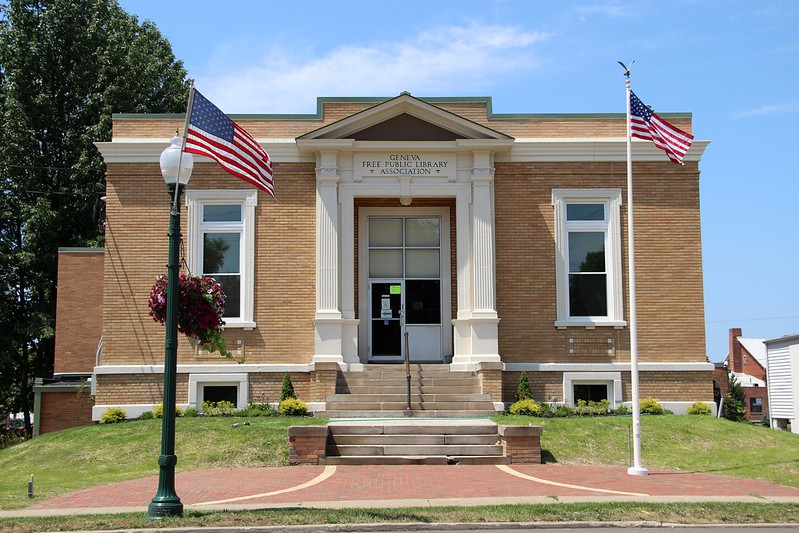
Geneva Carnegie library

The area which would eventually be Geneva was first settled in 1805 by a handful of settlers from Charlotte, New York. In 1806, settlers from Harpersfield, New York arrived and established Harpersfield Township, which included the present-day townships of Geneva, Trumbull and Hartsgrove. However, in 1816, citizens of Harpersfield decided to withdraw from the township and form their own township, which then became Geneva Township, named after Geneva, New York. In 1866, the town of Geneva then became a village, and, nearly one hundred years later, in 1958, Geneva was incorporated as a city.

=== Declaration of Lunar Ownership ===
On April 12, 1966, more than 200 people attended ceremonies at Geneva High School at which it was revealed that the city had claimed ownership of the moon. The "Declaration of Lunar Ownership" contained 35 signatures, and was revealed simultaneously with the city's 100th anniversary. It claimed that the "physical property of the moon shall belong exclusively to the citizens of Geneva, Ohio," and that unfriendly acts upon the city would be responded to with "all human dignity and moral circumspection." The city claimed the right to rent or lease its moon holdings via a two-thirds vote of the city's entire population, and provided for the sale of 100 deeds for 100 acres (0.40 km^{2}) of land, each acre priced at $100.

== Geography ==
Geneva is located 45 miles (72 km) east of Cleveland and 55 miles (89 km) west of Erie, Pennsylvania.

The city is bordered to the north, east and west by Geneva Township and by Harpersfield Township to the south. The Grand River flows around Geneva to the south in Harpersfield and to the west in Lake County. The Geneva State Park is located to the north of the city (within Geneva Township).

According to the United States Census Bureau, the city has a total area of 4.14 square miles (10.72 km^{2}), all land.

=== Major highways ===
- US 20
- SR 84
- SR 534

== Demographics ==
Historical population
Census	Pop.	Note	%±
1870	1,090		—
1880	1,993		82.8%
1890	2,194		10.1%
1900	2,342		6.7%
1910	2,496		6.6%
1920	3,081		23.4%
1930	3,791		23.0%
1940	4,171		10.0%
1950	4,718		13.1%
1960	5,677		20.3%
1970	6,449		13.6%
1980	6,655		3.2%
1990	6,597		−0.9%
2000	6,595		0.0%
2010	6,215		−5.8%
2020	5,924		−4.7%
2023 (est.)	5,866		−1.0%

=== 2020 census ===
As of the 2020 census, Geneva had a population of 5,924. The median age was 44.8 years, with 20.0% of residents under the age of 18 and 22.5% aged 65 years or older. For every 100 females there were 93.7 males, and for every 100 females age 18 and over there were 89.4 males.

99.1% of residents lived in urban areas, while 0.9% lived in rural areas.

There were 2,524 households in Geneva, of which 24.9% had children under the age of 18 living in them. Of all households, 36.9% were married-couple households, 19.9% were households with a male householder and no spouse or partner present, and 33.4% were households with a female householder and no spouse or partner present. About 37.0% of all households were made up of individuals and 17.5% had someone living alone who was 65 years of age or older.

There were 2,775 housing units, of which 9.0% were vacant. The homeowner vacancy rate was 1.4% and the rental vacancy rate was 6.8%.

Racial composition as of the 2020 census
Race	Number	Percent
White	5,237	88.4%
Black or African American	90	1.5%
American Indian and Alaska Native	16	0.3%
Asian	40	0.7%
Native Hawaiian and Other Pacific Islander	0	0.0%
Some other race	111	1.9%
Two or more races	430	7.3%
Hispanic or Latino (of any race)	389	6.6%

=== 2010 census ===
At the 2010 census there were 6,215 people in 2,479 households, including 1,527 families, in the city. The population density was 1,501.2 inhabitants per square mile (579.6/km^{2}). There were 2,769 housing units at an average density of 668.8 per square mile (258.2/km^{2}). The racial makeup of the city was 94.3% White, 1.7% African American, 0.1% Native American, 0.5% Asian, 1.8% from other races, and 1.7% from two or more races. Hispanic or Latino of any race were 5.5%.

Of the 2,479 households 30.9% had children under the age of 18 living with them, 43.1% were married couples living together, 13.8% had a female householder with no husband present, 4.7% had a male householder with no wife present, and 38.4% were non-families. 32.0% of households were one person and 14.1% were one person aged 65 or older. The average household size was 2.36 and the average family size was 2.96.

The median age was 40.9 years. 22.2% of residents were under the age of 18; 7.8% were between the ages of 18 and 24; 25.3% were from 25 to 44; 26.9% were from 45 to 64; and 17.8% were 65 or older. The gender makeup of the city was 48.8% male and 51.2% female.

=== 2000 census ===
At the 2000 census there were 6,595 people in 2,515 households, including 1,607 families, in the city. The population density was 1,650.4 inhabitants per square mile (637.2/km^{2}). There were 2,660 housing units at an average density of 665.7 per square mile (257.0/km^{2}). The racial makeup of the city was 94.84% White, 1.15% African American, 0.15% Native American, 0.24% Asian, 0.03% Pacific Islander, 1.80% from other races, and 1.77% from two or more races. Hispanic or Latino of any race were 5.94%.

Of the 2,515 households 30.6% had children under the age of 18 living with them, 47.6% were married couples living together, 12.2% had a female householder with no husband present, and 36.1% were non-families. 30.0% of households were one person and 13.0% were one person aged 65 or older. The average household size was 2.44 and the average family size was 3.04.

The age distribution was 23.9% under the age of 18, 8.9% from 18 to 24, 27.6% from 25 to 44, 22.0% from 45 to 64, and 17.6% 65 or older. The median age was 38 years. For every 100 females, there were 92.6 males and for every 100 females age 18 and over, there were 90.2 males.

The median household income was $35,048 and the median family income was $41,511. Males had a median income of $31,817 versus $23,927 for females. The per capita income for the city was $16,940. About 5.1% of families and 9.4% of the population were below the poverty line, including 6.5% of those under age 18 and 10.9% of those age 65 or over.

== Economy ==
Geneva is home to HDT Global, an industrial outfit that manufactures air conditioning, heating, and filtration units for heavy industry. In recent years, they have been awarded over $100 million in U.S. Department of Defense contracts.

== Arts and culture ==
=== Geneva Grape Jamboree ===
The Grape Jamboree is an annual celebration of the area's grape-growing and wine-producing industries. The festival occurs during the final full weekend of September, and lasts both days. Festivities include two parades, one held on each day, as well as various amusement park-type rides and typical festival food kiosks set up on the main streets (Route 20 and Route 534) of Geneva. Other activities include musical performances and an art show.

=== West Liberty Covered Bridge ===
An addition to Ashtabula County's existing covered bridges, the West Liberty Covered Bridge, purported to be the shortest covered bridge in the United States, opened in 2011.

== Infrastructure ==
Three major routes pass through (or near) Geneva. Interstate 90, the northernmost east–west and coast-to-coast interstate, passes roughly two miles south of the city. There, a full-access interchange (exit 218) intersects Route 534, which passes through Geneva and terminates north of the city. Route 534 intersects Route 20, the longest road in the United States, in downtown Geneva.

== Education ==
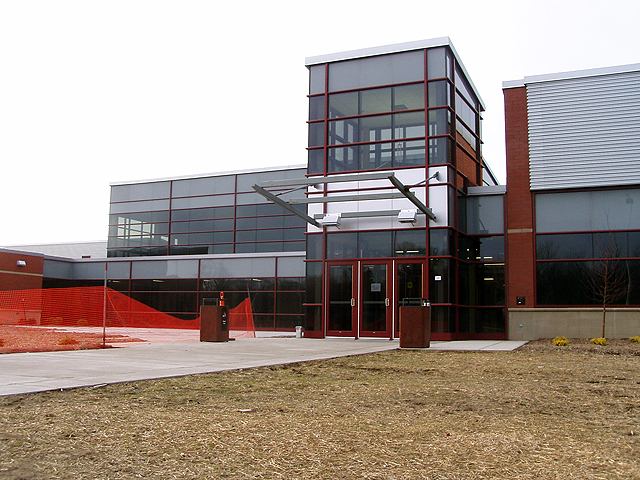
Geneva High School

The Geneva Area City School District provides K–12 education to students in Geneva as well as Geneva Township (including Geneva-on-the-Lake), Harpersfield Township, Trumbull Township and Austinburg Township (including Austinburg). The district has three elementary schools (Geneva Platt R. Spencer Elementary, Cork Elementary and Austinburg Elementary), one middle school (Geneva Middle School) and one high school (Geneva High School). The elementary schools serve students in grades K–5, while the middle school and high schools serve students in grades 6–8 and 9–12 respectively. The district has an open enrollment policy, allowing students from the entire county, as well as Lake and Geauga Counties to enroll.

Geneva has a public library, a branch of the Ashtabula County District Library.

== Notable people ==
- Brian Anderson, Major League Baseball pitcher
- Tammy Cochran, a country music singer, sang "Angels in Waiting"
- Emy Coligado, actress best known for her role in the sitcom Malcolm in the Middle
- Edward S. Ellis, author best known for writing hundreds of dime novels
- Ellen Spencer Mussey, lawyer, educator, and pioneer in the field of women's rights
- Ransom E. Olds, automotive pioneer, Oldsmobile and REO brands
- Paul Jessup, writer and video game designer.
- Mickey Sanzotta, an NFL running back for the Detroit Lions
- Platt Rogers Spencer, a calligrapher who invented Spencerian Script
- Freeman Thorp, an artist with works listed in the Smithsonian Institution's Inventory of American Paintings and Sculptures
- Marion E. Warner (1839–1918), American poet and short story writer
- Laura Rosamond White, an author, editor, and poet
