= Footville, Ohio =

Unincorporated community in Ohio, U.S.

Coordinates: 41°39′42″N 80°58′41″W

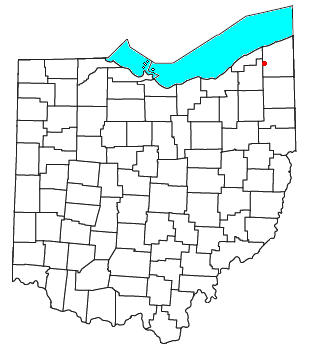
Location of Footville, Ohio

Footville is an unincorporated community in southwestern Trumbull Township, Ashtabula County, Ohio, United States. It lies at the intersection of State Route 166 with Trask Road / Graham Road, 1 1/2 miles (2.4 km) east of the Geauga County line and 11 1/4 miles (18.1 km) southeast of the village of Jefferson, the county seat of Ashtabula County. Spring and Trumbull Creeks, which are both tributaries of the Grand River, pass near Footville.

== Community ==
Footville is named for an early settler, Loren Foote, who donated land for a school and church in the community. For a time, a post office (now closed) was operated in Footville. A cemetery is located in the northeastern corner of the community. Its school, originally constructed in 1842, ceased operating when it consolidated with the Geneva school system; however, the building remains and is used for community events. A small park, which contains a playground and a memorial to veterans, is also located in the community.
