= Saybrook =

Saybrook may refer to:

== Places ==
- Saybrook Colony (1635–1644), later merged with what is now the State of Connecticut
- Old Saybrook, Connecticut
- Saybrook, Illinois, a village
- Saybrook Township, Ashtabula County, Ohio and the unincorporated crossroads of Saybrook in the township

== Education ==
- Saybrook College, one of the 14 residential colleges at Yale University in New Haven, Connecticut
- Saybrook University (originally the Humanistic Psychology Institute, and later Saybrook Graduate School and Research Center), a California university specializing in psychology, organizational systems, and human science

== See also ==
- Marty Saybrooke, a fictional character
