= Lenox Township, Ashtabula County, Ohio =

Township in Ohio, US

- Township
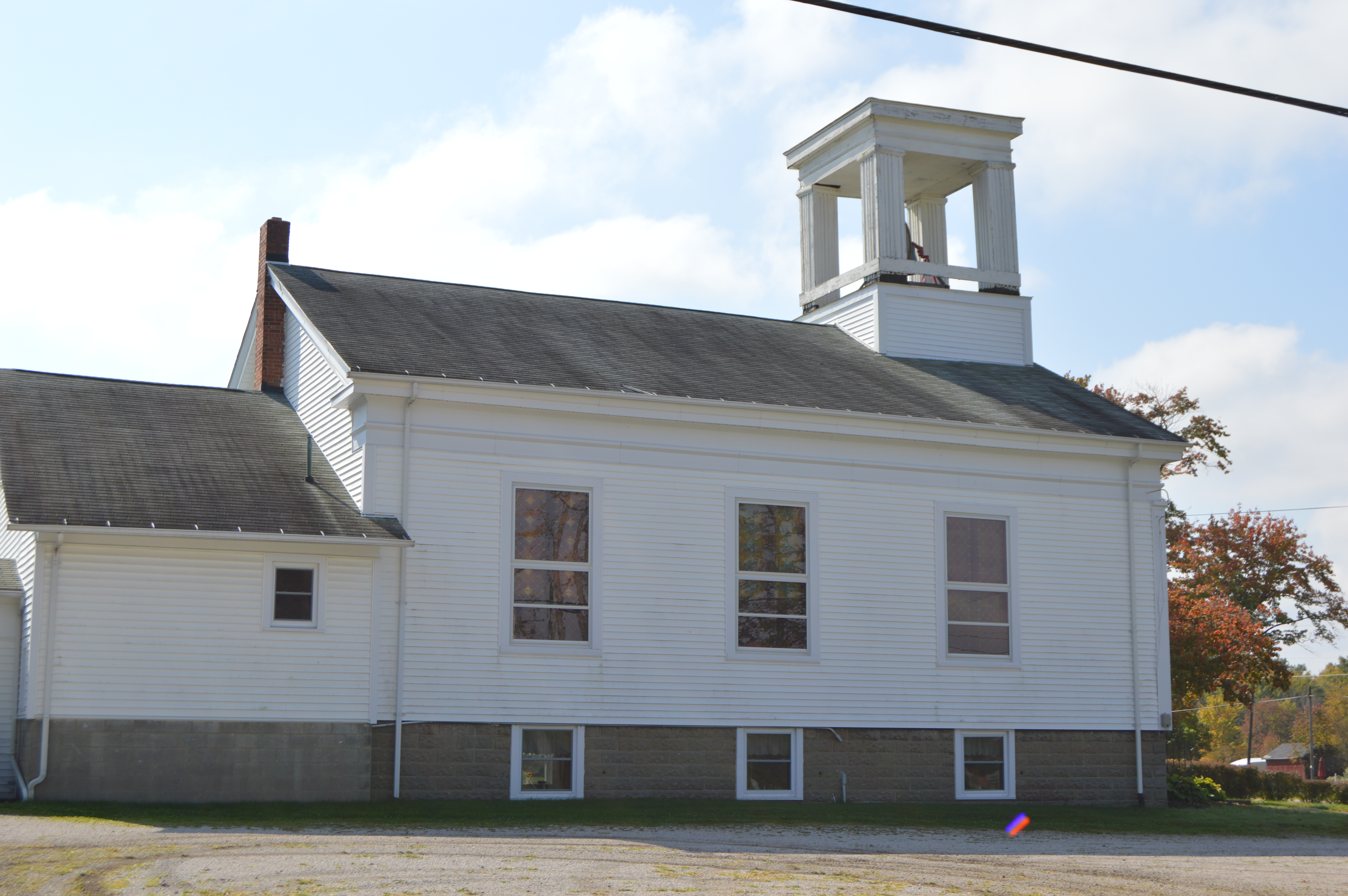
- Lenox Christian Fellowship at Lenox Center

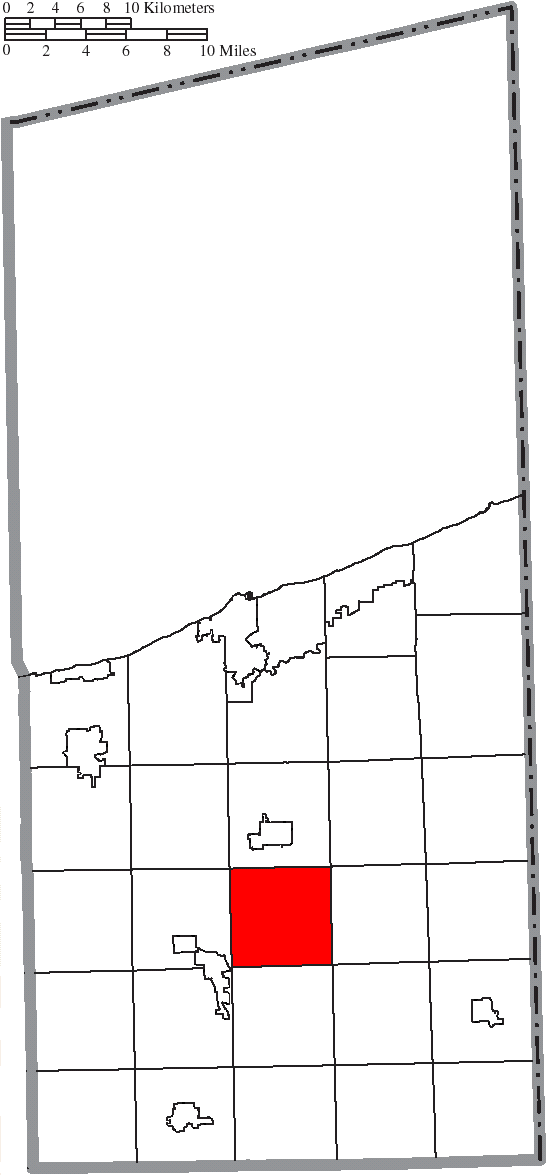
- Location of Lenox Township in Ashtabula County
- Coordinates: 41°41′14″N 80°45′7″W
- Country: United States
- State: Ohio
- County: Ashtabula

Area
  - Total: 24.4 sq mi (63.1 km^{2})
  - Land: 24.3 sq mi (62.9 km^{2})
  - Water: 0.039 sq mi (0.1 km^{2})
- Elevation: 1,001 ft (305 m)

Population (2020)
  - Total: 1,374
  - Density: 60/sq mi (23/km^{2})
- Time zone: UTC-5 (Eastern (EST))
  - Summer (DST): UTC-4 (EDT)
- ZIP code: 44047
- Area code: 440
- FIPS code: 39-42742
- GNIS feature ID: 1085731

Lenox Township is one of the twenty-seven townships of Ashtabula County, Ohio, United States. The 2020 census found 1,374 people in the township.

== Geography ==
Located in the center of the county, it borders the following townships:

- Jefferson Township - north
- Denmark Township - northeast corner
- Dorset Township - east
- Cherry Valley Township - southeast corner
- New Lyme Township - south
- Rome Township - southwest corner
- Morgan Township - west
- Austinburg Township - northwest corner

No municipalities are located in Lenox Township.

== Name and history ==
It is the only Lenox Township statewide.

The first settler in Lenox Township was former Maryland resident Lyle Asque, who arrived in 1807. Lenox Township was organized in 1819.

== Government ==
The township is governed by a three-member board of trustees, who are elected in November of odd-numbered years to a four-year term beginning on the following January 1. Two are elected in the year after the presidential election and one is elected in the year before it. There is also an elected township fiscal officer, Robin Hayford-Fiebig who serves a four-year term beginning on April 1 of the year after the election, which is held in November of the year before the presidential election. Vacancies in the fiscal officership or on the board of trustees are filled by the remaining trustees. Currently, the members of the board are John Maylish, Barry Weaver, and James Robinsoni
