= Madison Township, Lake County, Ohio =

Township in Ohio, US

- Township
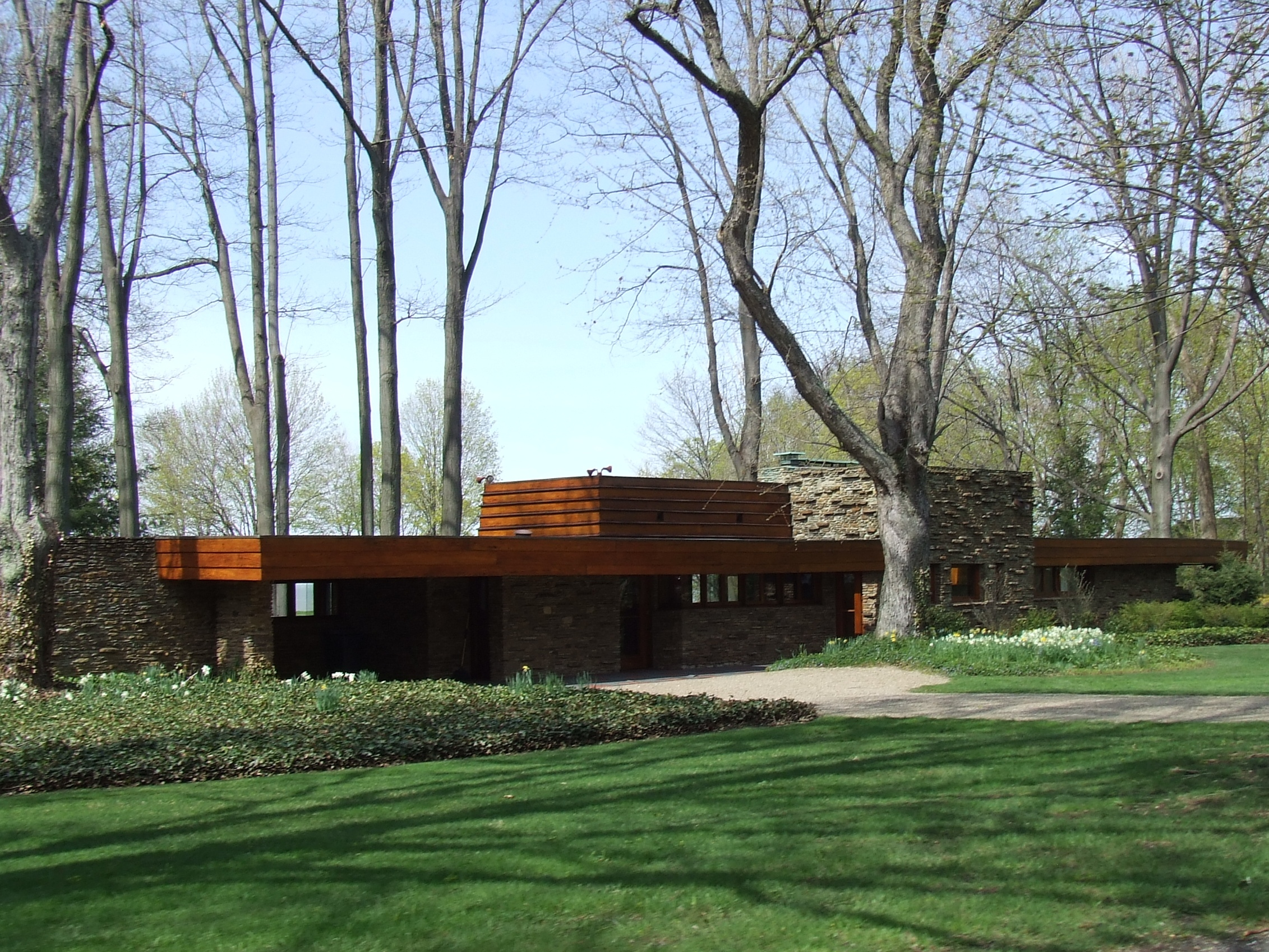
- The Karl A. Staley House, designed by Frank Lloyd Wright

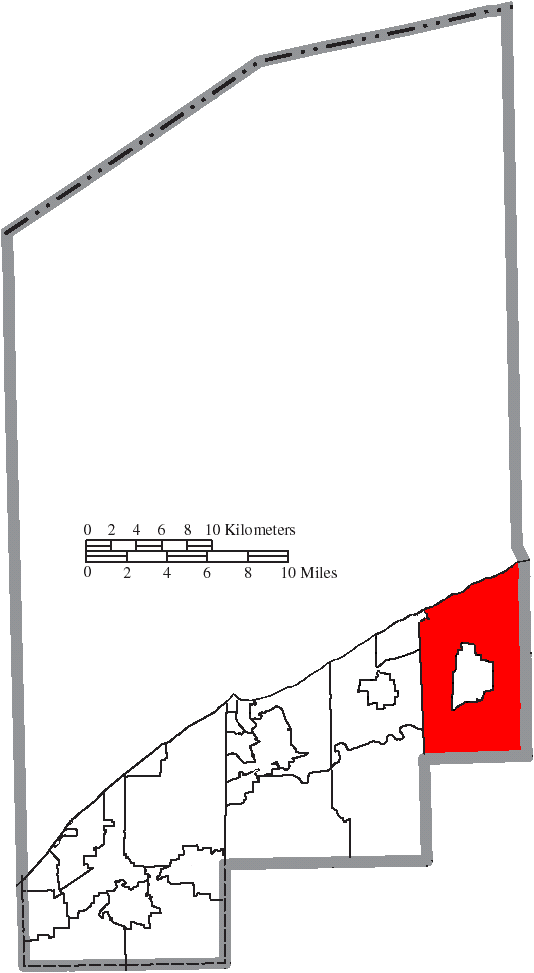
- Location of Madison Township in Lake County
- Coordinates: 41°48′22″N 81°3′33″W
- Country: United States
- State: Ohio
- County: Lake

Area
  - Total: 184.6 sq mi (478.0 km^{2})
  - Land: 43.2 sq mi (112.0 km^{2})
  - Water: 141.4 sq mi (366.1 km^{2})
- Elevation: 620 ft (190 m)

Population (2020)
  - Total: 18,492
  - Density: 427.6/sq mi (165.1/km^{2})
- Time zone: UTC-5 (Eastern (EST))
  - Summer (DST): UTC-4 (EDT)
- ZIP code: 44057
- Area code: 440
- FIPS code: 39-46494
- GNIS feature ID: 1086423
- Website: www.madisontownship.net

Madison Township is one of the five townships of Lake County, Ohio, United States. As of the 2020 census the population was 18,492. It is the largest township in Ohio by area.

== Geography ==
Located in the easternmost part of the county along Lake Erie, it borders the following townships:

- Geneva Township, Ashtabula County - northeast
- Harpersfield Township, Ashtabula County - east
- Trumbull Township, Ashtabula County - southeast corner
- Thompson Township, Geauga County - south
- LeRoy Township - southwest
- Perry Township - west

Several populated places are located in Madison Township:

- The village of Madison, in the center
- A small portion of the village of North Perry, in the far northwest
- The census-designated place of North Madison, along the lakeshore
- Part of the unincorporated community of Unionville, on the border with Harpersfield Township

According to the U.S. Census Bureau, Madison Township has a total area of 184.6 square miles (478.0 km^{2}), of which 43.2 square miles (112.0 km^{2}) are land and 141.4 square miles (366.1 km^{2}), or 76.6%, are water. The township extends north into the center of Lake Erie, where it ends at the Canadian border.

== Name ==
The township was probably named for James Madison or after Madison, Connecticut. It is one of twenty Madison Townships statewide.

== Government ==
The township is governed by a three-member board of trustees, who are elected in November of odd-numbered years to a four-year term beginning on the following January 1. Two are elected in the year after the presidential election and one is elected in the year before it. There is also an elected township fiscal officer, who serves a four-year term beginning on April 1 of the year after the election, which is held in November of the year before the presidential election. Vacancies in the fiscal officership or on the board of trustees are filled by the remaining trustees. Currently, the board is composed of Chairman Thomas Sill, and members Max Andersen Jr., and Peter V. Wayman, and Sarah Hamercheck is the Fiscal Officer

== Education ==
Students enrolled in kindergarten through the fifth grade attend Madison Elementary North or Madison Elementary South and students in grades sixth through eight attend Madison Middle School. Local high school students attend Madison High School. Madison Township is also home to one of Lakeland Community College's three off-site centers.
