= Plymouth Township, Ashtabula County, Ohio =

Township in Ohio, US

- Township
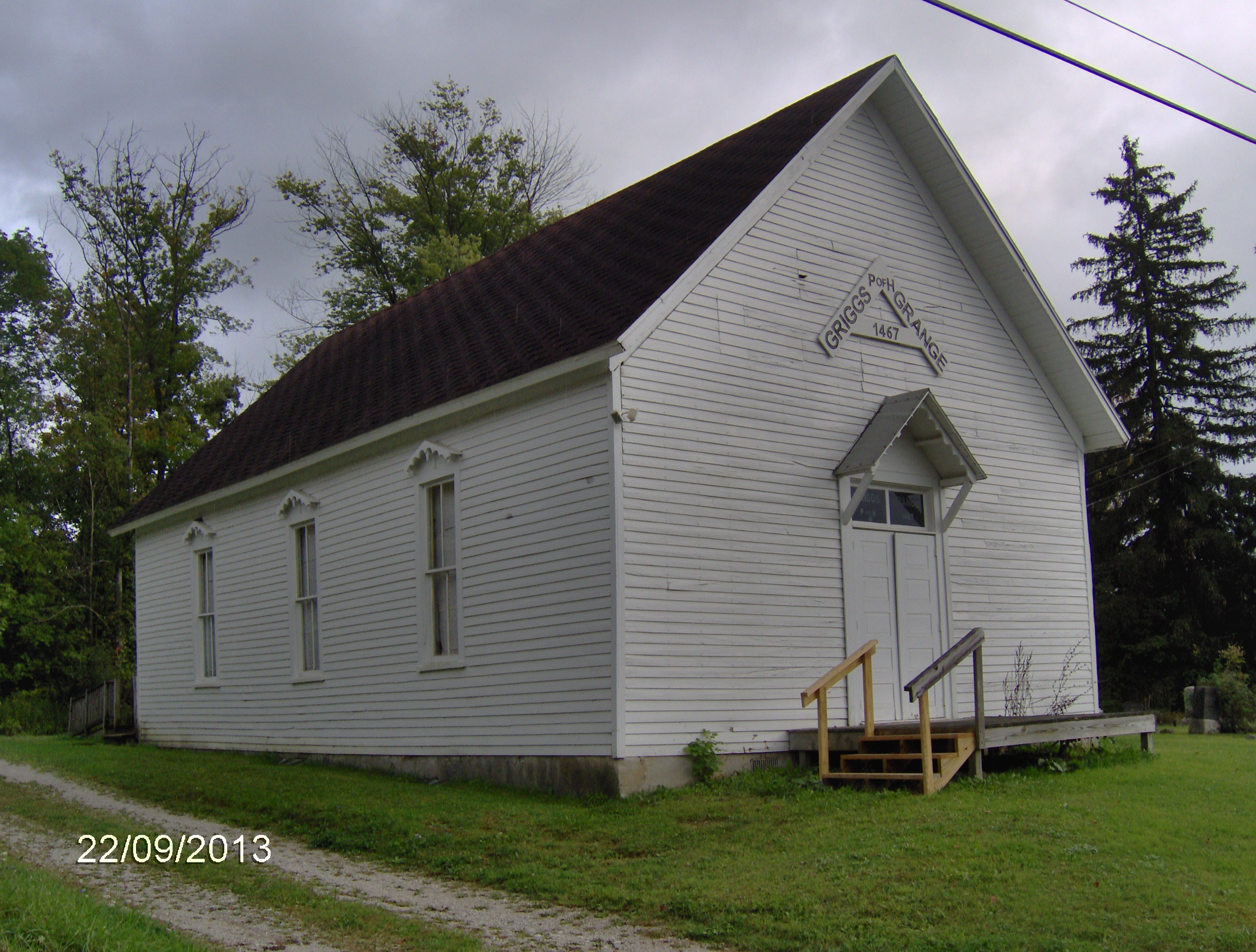
- Griggs Grange No. 1467

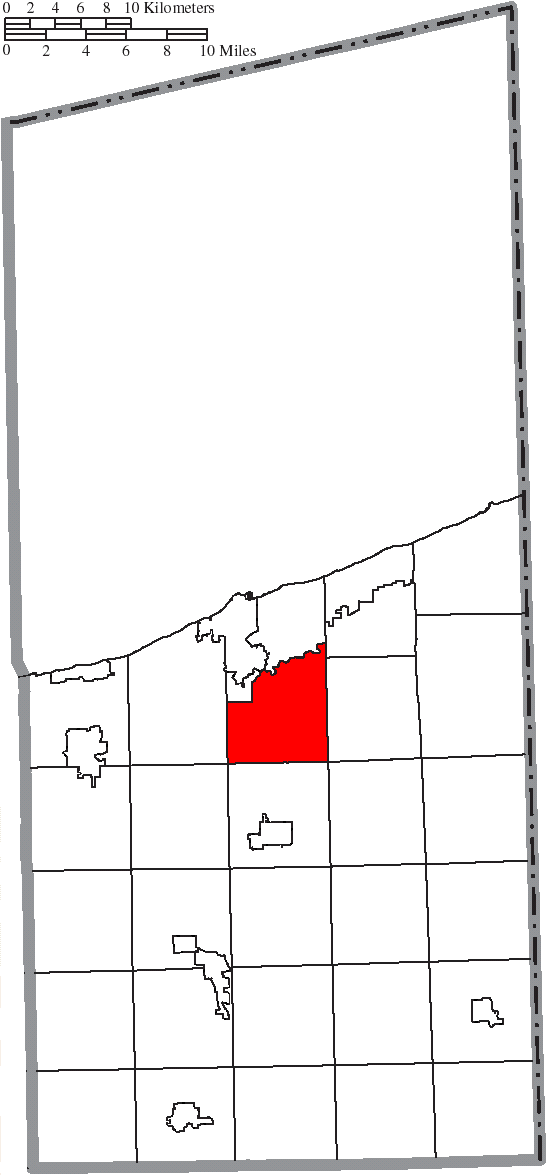
- Location of Plymouth Township in Ashtabula County
- Coordinates: 41°49′54″N 80°45′10″W
- Country: United States
- State: Ohio
- County: Ashtabula

Area
  - Total: 22.4 sq mi (57.9 km^{2})
  - Land: 22.3 sq mi (57.7 km^{2})
  - Water: 0.077 sq mi (0.2 km^{2})
- Elevation: 840 ft (256 m)

Population (2020)
  - Total: 1,928
  - Density: 89/sq mi (34.3/km^{2})
- Time zone: UTC-5 (Eastern (EST))
  - Summer (DST): UTC-4 (EDT)
- FIPS code: 39-63772
- GNIS feature ID: 1085738
- Website: plymouthtownshipohio.net

Plymouth Township is one of the twenty-seven townships of Ashtabula County, Ohio, United States. The 2020 census found 1,928 people in the township.

== Geography ==
Located in the northern part of the county, it borders the following townships:

- Ashtabula Township - north
- Kingsville Township - northeast
- Sheffield Township - east
- Denmark Township - southeast corner
- Jefferson Township - south
- Austinburg Township - southwest corner
- Saybrook Township - west

No municipalities are located in Plymouth Township.

The unincorporated settlements of Plymouth and Plymouth Center are located near the center of the township.

== Name and history ==
Statewide, the only other Plymouth Township is located in Richland County.

The first settlers in Plymouth Township arrived in 1805 and 1806.

== Government ==
The township is governed by a three-member board of trustees, who are elected in November of odd-numbered years to a four-year term beginning on the following January 1. Two are elected in the year after the presidential election and one is elected in the year before it. There is also an elected township fiscal officer, who serves a four-year term beginning on April 1 of the year after the election, which is held in November of the year before the presidential election. Vacancies in the fiscal officership or on the board of trustees are filled by the remaining trustees. Currently, the board is composed of chairman David Waldron and members Deborah Friedstrom and Kevin Presley.
