= Thompson Township, Geauga County, Ohio =

Township in Ohio, US

- Township
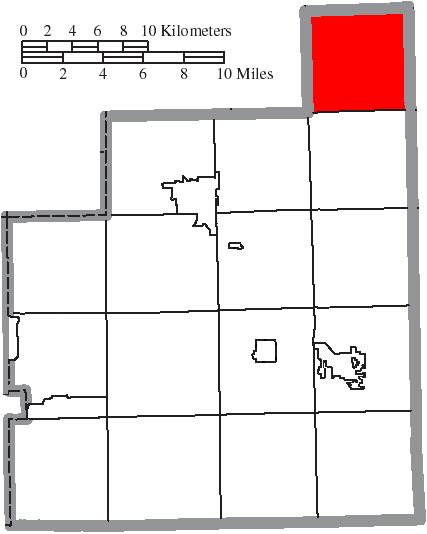
- Location of Thompson Township in Geauga County
- Coordinates: 41°40′28″N 81°3′27″W
- Country: United States
- State: Ohio
- County: Geauga

Area
  - Total: 25.7 sq mi (66.5 km^{2})
  - Land: 25.5 sq mi (66.1 km^{2})
  - Water: 0.12 sq mi (0.3 km^{2})
- Elevation: 1,250 ft (381 m)

Population (2020)
  - Total: 2,144
  - Density: 89/sq mi (34.3/km^{2})
- Time zone: UTC-5 (Eastern (EST))
  - Summer (DST): UTC-4 (EDT)
- ZIP code: 44086
- Area code: 440
- FIPS code: 39-76628
- GNIS feature ID: 1086161
- Website: thompsonohio.org

Thompson Township is one of the sixteen townships of Geauga County, Ohio, United States. As of the 2020 census the population was 2,144.

== Geography ==
Located in the northeastern corner of the county, it borders the following townships:

- Madison Township, Lake County – north
- Harpersfield Township, Ashtabula County – northeast corner
- Trumbull Township, Ashtabula County – east
- Hartsgrove Township, Ashtabula County – southeast corner
- Montville Township – south
- Hambden Township – southwest corner
- LeRoy Township, Lake County – west

No municipalities are located in Thompson Township. The township contains the unincorporated community of Thompson.

Thompson Township is the location of the Thompson Ledges landform.

== Name and history ==
Statewide, other Thompson Townships are located in Delaware and Seneca counties.

== Government ==
The township is governed by a three-member board of trustees, who are elected in November of odd-numbered years to a four-year term beginning on the following January 1. Two are elected in the year after the presidential election and one is elected in the year before it. There is also an elected township fiscal officer, who serves a four-year term beginning on April 1 of the year after the election, which is held in November of the year before the presidential election. Vacancies in the fiscal officership or on the board of trustees are filled by the remaining trustees.

== Communications ==
Thompson Township is the site of WKSV 89.1 FM, a repeater transmitter for the WKSU public radio station based in Kent. Thompson is also the site of W34FP-D’s transmitter, for WVIZ; a PBS member station in Cleveland, Ohio.

== Notable people ==
Charles Martin Hall inventor of the modern process of aluminum production and founder of Alcoa.
