= Morgan Township, Ashtabula County, Ohio =

Township in Ohio, US

- Township
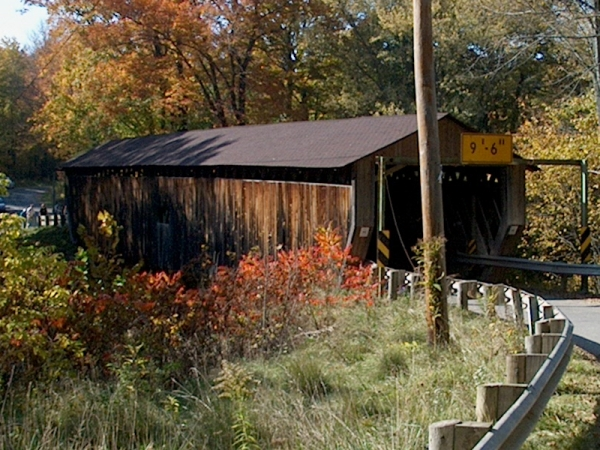
- Riverdale Road Covered Bridge

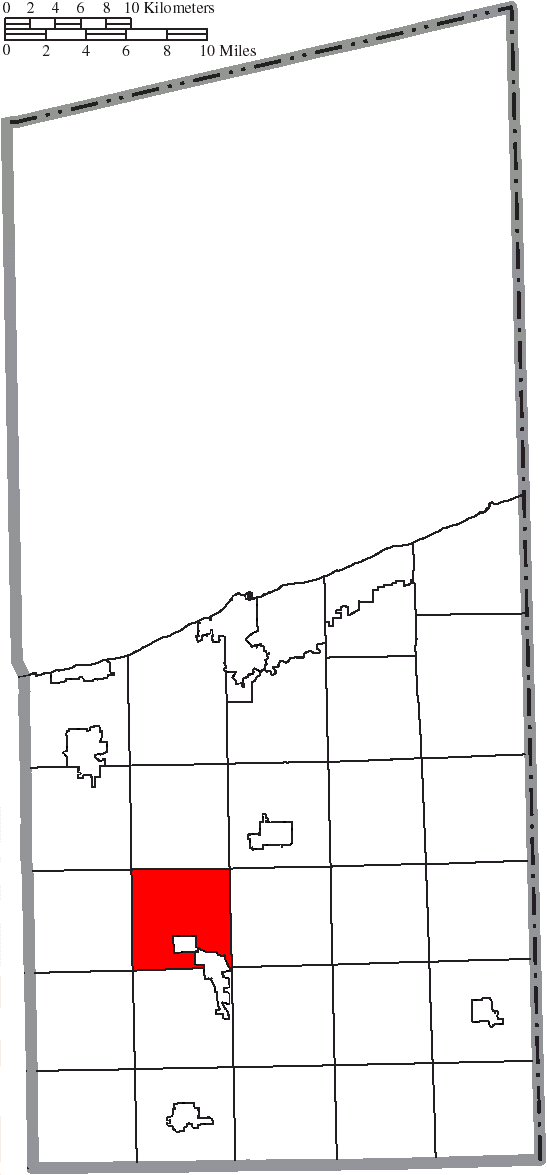
- Location of Morgan Township in Ashtabula County
- Coordinates: 41°39′45″N 80°50′58″W
- Country: United States
- State: Ohio
- County: Ashtabula

Area
  - Total: 24.2 sq mi (62.7 km^{2})
  - Land: 23.9 sq mi (61.9 km^{2})
  - Water: 0.31 sq mi (0.8 km^{2})
- Elevation: 814 ft (248 m)

Population (2020)
  - Total: 2,293
  - Density: 91/sq mi (35.1/km^{2})
- Time zone: UTC-5 (Eastern (EST))
  - Summer (DST): UTC-4 (EDT)
- FIPS code: 39-52066
- GNIS feature ID: 1085733
- Website: https://www.morgantwp.us/

Morgan Township is one of the twenty-seven townships of Ashtabula County, Ohio, United States. The 2020 census found 2,293 people in the township.

== Geography ==
Located in the western part of the county, it borders the following townships:

- Austinburg Township - north
- Jefferson Township - northeast corner
- Lenox Township - east
- New Lyme Township - southeast corner
- Rome Township - south
- Hartsgrove Township - southwest corner
- Trumbull Township - west
- Harpersfield Township - northwest corner

Two villages are located in Morgan Township: part of Roaming Shores in the southeast, and Rock Creek in the center.

== Name and history ==
Named for Connecticut landowner John Morgan, it is one of six Morgan Townships statewide.

The first Euro-American settler in Morgan Township was Nathan Gillett, who came from Connecticut in 1801.

== Government ==
The township is governed by a three-member board of trustees, who are elected in November of odd-numbered years to a four-year term beginning on the following January 1. Two are elected in the year after the presidential election and one is elected in the year before it. There is also an elected township fiscal officer, who serves a four-year term beginning on April 1 of the year after the election, which is held in November of the year before the presidential election. Vacancies in the fiscal officership or on the board of trustees are filled by the remaining trustees. Currently, the board is composed of chairman Bob Martin and members Mike Jones, David Larosa and Fiscal Officer Marie Lesko Silbaugh.
