= Roaming Shores, Ohio =

- Village
- Seal

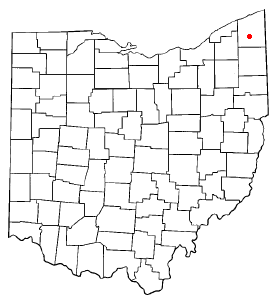
- Location of Roaming Shores, Ohio

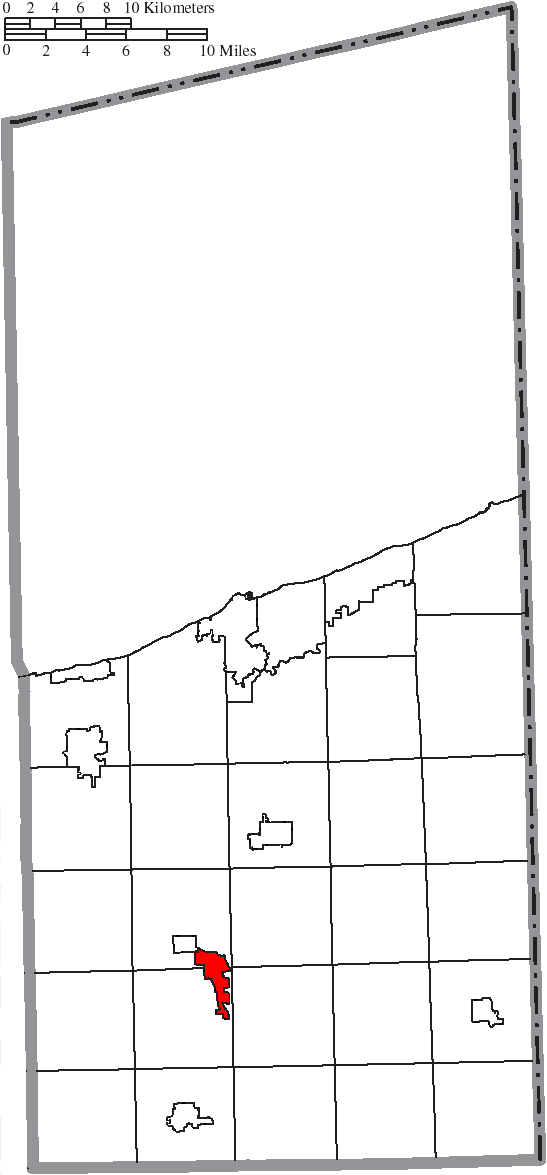
- Location of Roaming Shores in Ashtabula County
- Coordinates: 41°38′35″N 80°49′24″W
- Country: United States
- State: Ohio
- County: Ashtabula
- Township: Rome, Morgan

Area
  - Total: 2.92 sq mi (7.55 km^{2})
  - Land: 2.20 sq mi (5.69 km^{2})
  - Water: 0.72 sq mi (1.86 km^{2})
- Elevation: 869 ft (265 m)

Population (2020)
  - Total: 1,586
  - Density: 722.1/sq mi (278.79/km^{2})
- Time zone: UTC-5 (Eastern (EST))
  - Summer (DST): UTC-4 (EDT)
- ZIP codes: 44084-44085
- Area code: 440
- FIPS code: 39-67600
- GNIS feature ID: 1052967
- Website: www.roamingshores.org

Roaming Shores is a village in Rome and Morgan townships, Ashtabula County, Ohio, United States. The population was 1,586 at the 2020 census.

== Geography ==
According to the United States Census Bureau, the village has a total area of 2.82 square miles (7.30 km^{2}), of which 2.10 square miles (5.44 km^{2}) is land and 0.72 square miles (1.86 km^{2}) is water.

== Demographics ==
Historical population
| Census | Pop. | Note | %± |
|---|---|---|---|
| 1980 | 581 | | — |
| 1990 | 775 | | 33.4% |
| 2000 | 1,239 | | 59.9% |
| 2010 | 1,508 | | 21.7% |
| 2020 | 1,586 | | 5.2% |
U.S. Decennial Census

=== 2010 census ===
As of the census of 2010, there were 1,508 people, 582 households, and 433 families living in the village. The population density was 718.1 inhabitants per square mile (277.3/km^{2}). There were 866 housing units at an average density of 412.4 per square mile (159.2/km^{2}). The racial makeup of the village was 98.6% White, 0.5% African American, 0.3% Asian, and 0.6% from two or more races. Hispanic or Latino of any race were 0.5% of the population.

There were 582 households, of which 34.0% had children under the age of 18 living with them, 64.8% were married couples living together, 6.5% had a female householder with no husband present, 3.1% had a male householder with no wife present, and 25.6% were non-families. 20.4% of all households were made up of individuals, and 7.7% had someone living alone who was 65 years of age or older. The average household size was 2.59 and the average family size was 2.98.

The median age in the village was 40.2 years. 24.9% of residents were under the age of 18; 5.6% were between the ages of 18 and 24; 26.8% were from 25 to 44; 29.3% were from 45 to 64; and 13.5% were 65 years of age or older. The gender makeup of the village was 50.6% male and 49.4% female.

=== 2000 census ===
As of the census of 2000, there were 1,239 people, 486 households, and 386 families living in the village. The population density was 596.1 inhabitants per square mile (230.2/km^{2}). There were 641 housing units at an average density of 308.4 per square mile (119.1/km^{2}). The racial makeup of the village was 97.42% White, 1.61% African American, 0.16% Native American, 0.08% Asian, 0.08% Pacific Islander, and 0.65% from two or more races. Hispanic or Latino of any race were 0.32% of the population. 21.2% were of German, 14.0% Irish, 10.7% English, 9.7% American and 9.4% Italian ancestry according to Census 2000.

There were 486 households, out of which 32.1% had children under the age of 18 living with them, 70.4% were married couples living together, 5.8% had a female householder with no husband present, and 20.4% were non-families. 16.7% of all households were made up of individuals, and 6.2% had someone living alone who was 65 years of age or older. The average household size was 2.55 and the average family size was 2.85.

In the village, the population was spread out, with 23.2% under the age of 18, 5.2% from 18 to 24, 31.4% from 25 to 44, 28.7% from 45 to 64, and 11.5% who were 65 years of age or older. The median age was 39 years. For every 100 females there were 109.6 males. For every 100 females age 18 and over, there were 112.5 males.

The median income for a household in the village was $57,431, and the median income for a family was $64,750. Males had a median income of $46,000 versus $29,583 for females. The per capita income for the village was $26,470. About 1.5% of families and 1.0% of the population were below the poverty line, including 1.7% of those under age 18 and none of those age 65 or over.
