= Jefferson Township, Ashtabula County, Ohio =

Township in Ohio, US

- Township
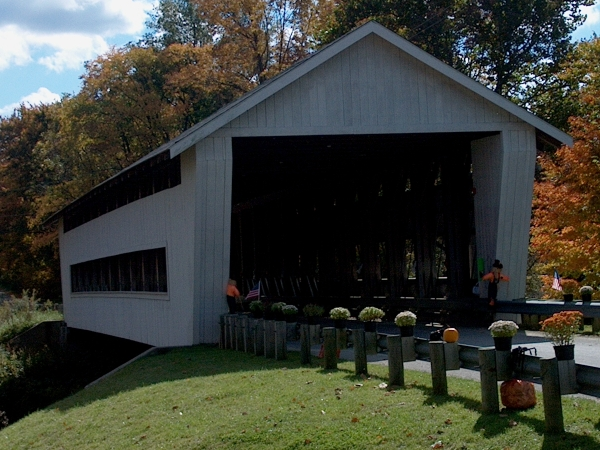
- Giddings Road Covered Bridge

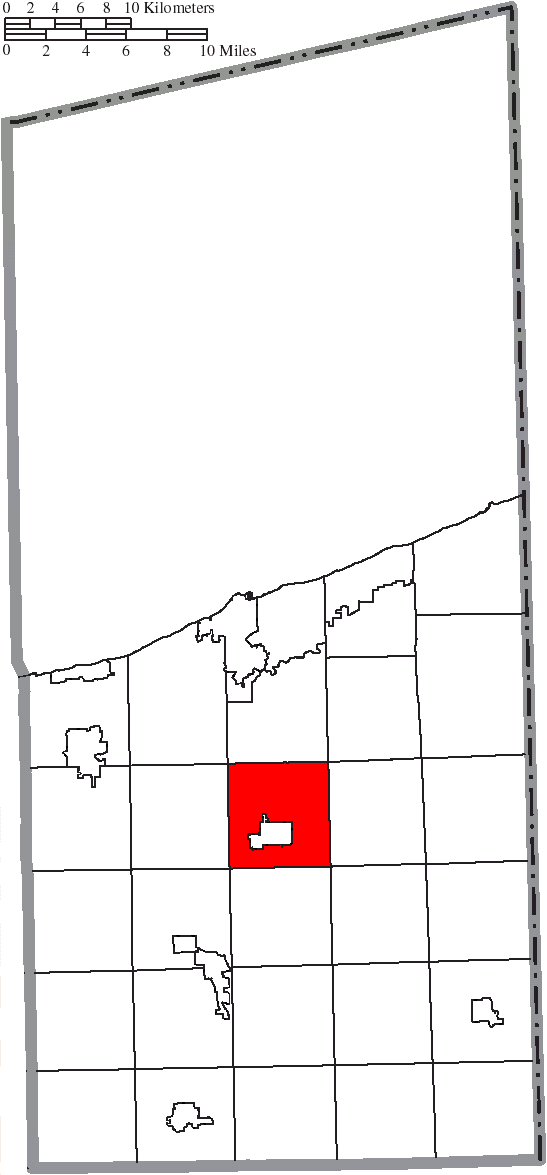
- Location of Jefferson Township in Ashtabula County
- Coordinates: 41°44′41″N 80°45′46″W
- Country: United States
- State: Ohio
- County: Ashtabula

Area
  - Total: 25.9 sq mi (67.0 km^{2})
  - Land: 25.8 sq mi (66.7 km^{2})
  - Water: 0.12 sq mi (0.3 km^{2})
- Elevation: 906 ft (276 m)

Population (2020)
  - Total: 5,317
  - Density: 204/sq mi (78.8/km^{2})
- Time zone: UTC-5 (Eastern (EST))
  - Summer (DST): UTC-4 (EDT)
- ZIP code: 44047
- Area code: 440
- FIPS code: 39-38514
- GNIS feature ID: 1085729
- Website: jeffohtwp.org

Jefferson Township is one of the twenty-seven townships of Ashtabula County, Ohio, United States. The population was 5,317 at the 2020 census.

== Geography ==
Located in the central part of the county, it borders the following townships:

- Plymouth Township - north
- Sheffield Township - northeast corner
- Denmark Township - east
- Dorset Township - southeast corner
- Lenox Township - south
- Morgan Township - southwest corner
- Austinburg Township - west
- Saybrook Township - northwest corner

The village of Jefferson, the county seat of Ashtabula County, is located in central Jefferson Township.

== Name and history ==
It is one of twenty-four Jefferson Townships statewide.

The township was first settled in 1805 by former Connecticut resident Michael Webster.

== Government ==
The township is governed by a three-member board of trustees, who are elected in November of odd-numbered years to a four-year term beginning on the following January 1. Two are elected in the year after the presidential election and one is elected in the year before it. There is also an elected township fiscal officer, who serves a four-year term beginning on April 1 of the year after the election, which is held in November of the year before the presidential election. Vacancies in the fiscal officership or on the board of trustees are filled by the remaining trustees. Currently, the board is composed of chairwoman Charlene Kusar and members Martha Demshar and John Wayman.
