= Unionville, Ashtabula County, Ohio =

Unionville, Ohio
- Unincorporated community
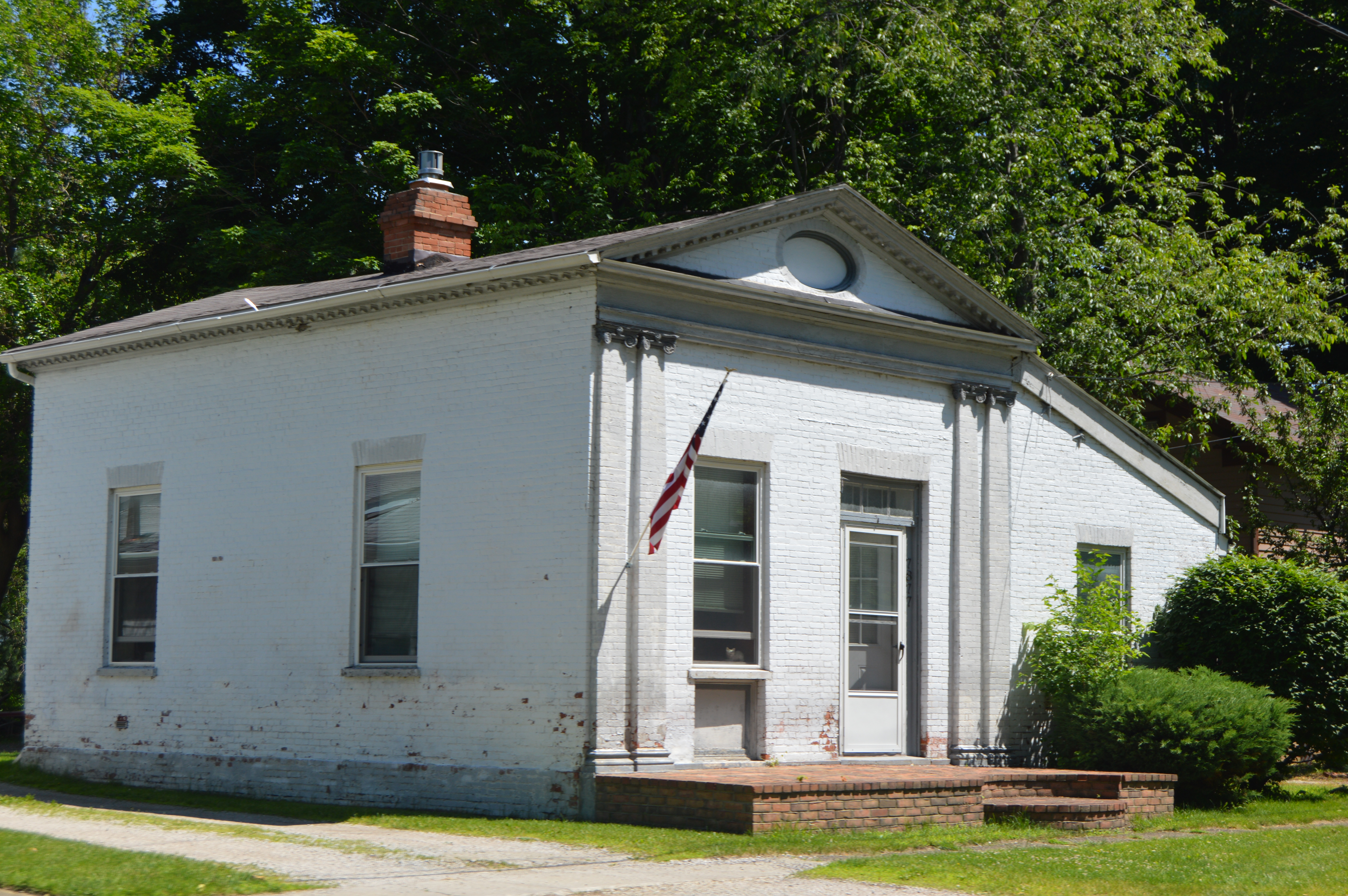
- Connecticut Land Company Office

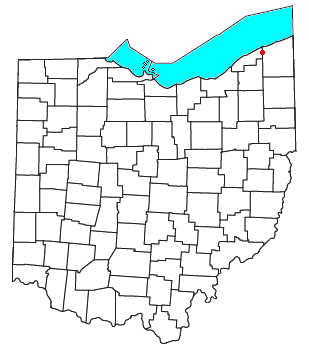
- Location of Unionville, Ohio
- Coordinates: 41°46′49″N 81°00′10″W
- Country: United States
- State: Ohio
- Counties: Ashtabula, Lake
- Elevation: 742 ft (226 m)
- Time zone: UTC-5 (Eastern (EST))
  - Summer (DST): UTC-4 (EDT)
- ZIP code: 44088
- Area code: 440
- GNIS feature ID: 1065411

Unionville is an unincorporated community on the line between northwestern Harpersfield Township in Ashtabula County and eastern Madison Township in Lake County, in the U.S. state of Ohio. It has a post office with the ZIP code 44088. It lies along State Route 84.

The community's location where two counties meet caused the name "Union" to be selected. Unionville is the site of the land office of the Connecticut Western Reserve; it is listed on the National Register of Historic Places.

== Notable person ==
- Edwin Wheeler, Wisconsin jurist and legislator
