= Harpersfield Township, Ashtabula County, Ohio =

Township in Ohio, US

- Township
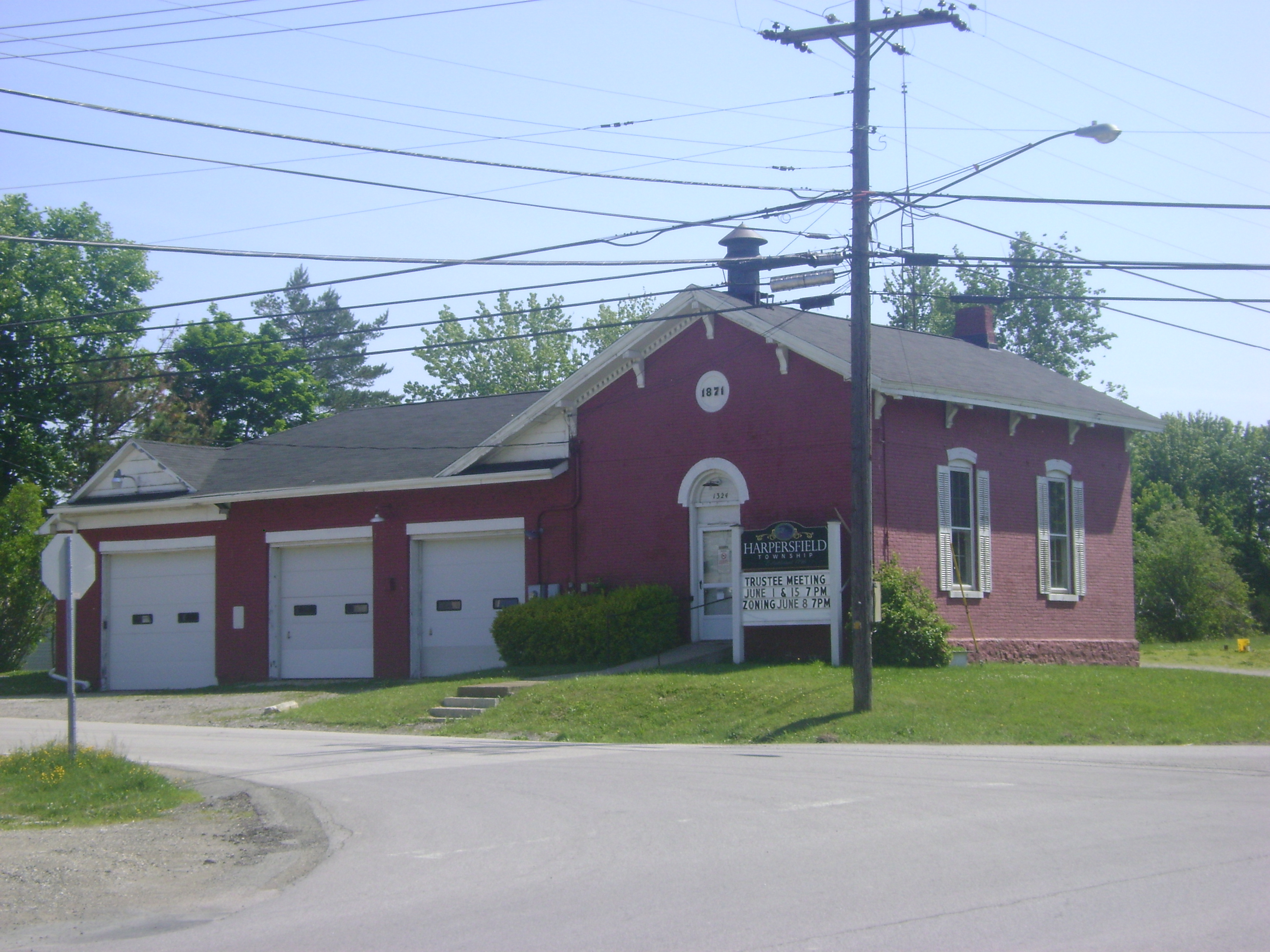
- Harpersfield Township's former government building

- Flag Seal

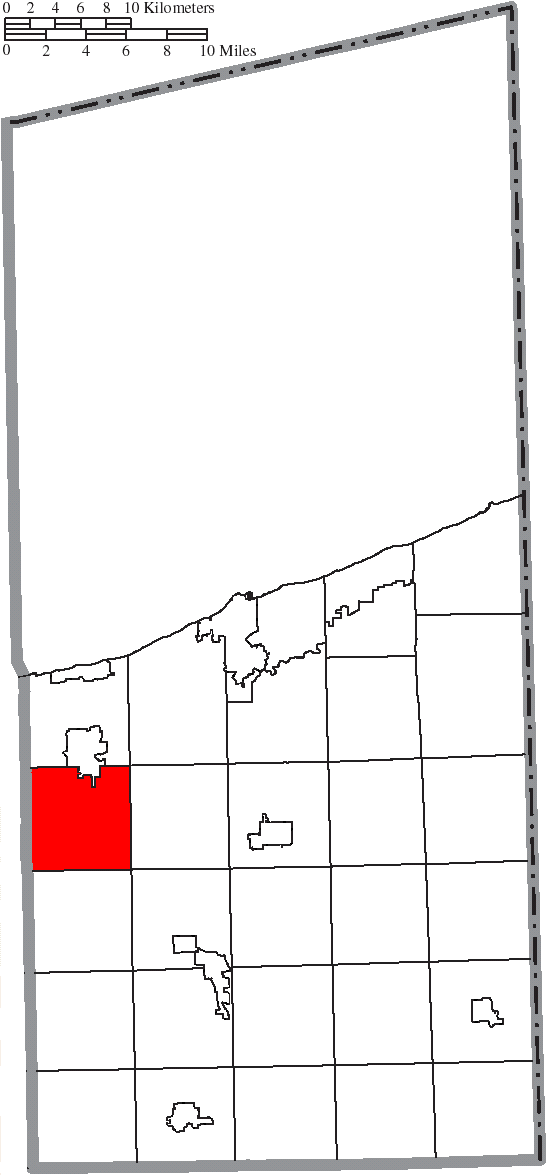
- Location of Harpersfield Township in Ashtabula County
- Coordinates: 41°44′49″N 80°57′35″W
- Country: United States
- State: Ohio
- County: Ashtabula

Area
  - Total: 25.9 sq mi (67.2 km^{2})
  - Land: 25.9 sq mi (67.0 km^{2})
  - Water: 0.077 sq mi (0.2 km^{2})
- Elevation: 890 ft (270 m)

Population (2020)
  - Total: 2,591
  - Density: 104/sq mi (40.2/km^{2})
- Time zone: UTC-5 (Eastern (EST))
  - Summer (DST): UTC-4 (EDT)
- FIPS code: 39-33642
- GNIS feature ID: 1085727
- Website: www.harpersfield.us

Harpersfield Township is one of the twenty-seven townships of Ashtabula County, Ohio, United States. The 2020 census found 2,591 people in the township.

== Geography ==
Located on the northwestern edge of the county, it borders the following townships:

- Geneva Township - North
- Saybrook Township - Northeast corner
- Austinburg Township - East
- Morgan Township - Southeast corner
- Trumbull Township - South
- Thompson Township, Geauga County - Southwest corner
- Madison Township, Lake County - West

Part of the city of Geneva is located in northern Harpersfield Township, and the unincorporated community of Unionville lies in the township's northwest.

== Name and history ==
It is the only Harpersfield Township statewide.

The township was first settled by Revolutionary War Colonel Alexander Harper and his family, who moved from Harpersfield, New York on June 28, 1798. Colonel Harper died there in September of that year.

It is said that soon after landing, Colonel Harper placed his staff in the ground and dedicated a portion of land as a cemetery, and he himself was the first to be buried there; he being the first white person buried in the Western Reserve, whose grave can be identified. An appropriate monument bearing an inscription with the name and date of birth and death, and recounting the virtues of the pioneer and patriot still marks the spot. This cemetery is on the county line at Unionville village.

Harpersfield Township was described in 1833 as having one store, two flouring mills, two saw mills, one fulling mill, and two forges.

== Government ==
The township is governed by a three-member board of trustees, who are elected in November of odd-numbered years to a four-year term beginning on the following January 1. Two are elected in the year after the presidential election and one is elected in the year before it. There is also an elected township fiscal officer, who serves a four-year term beginning on April 1 of the year after the election, which is held in November of the year before the presidential election. Vacancies in the fiscal officership or on the board of trustees are filled by the remaining trustees.

Currently, the board is composed of James Pristov and Ed Spoor and Micki Mihalic, and the fiscal officer is Sharon Rohrbaugh.

== Notable people ==
- Orrin Hickok (1838–1903) - American harness racer
