= Geneva Township, Ashtabula County, Ohio =

Township in Ohio, US

- Township
- Logo

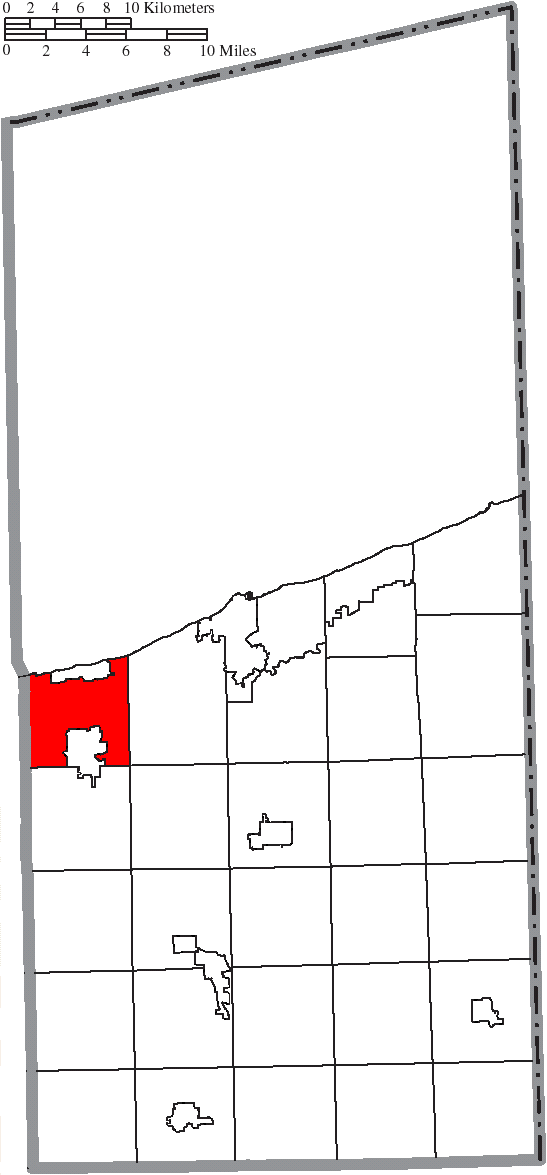
- Location of Geneva Township in Ashtabula County
- Coordinates: 41°49′12″N 80°56′30″W
- Country: United States
- State: Ohio
- County: Ashtabula
- Organized: 1816

Area
  - Total: 25.93 sq mi (67.15 km^{2})
  - Land: 25.90 sq mi (67.08 km^{2})
  - Water: 0.023 sq mi (0.06 km^{2})
- Elevation: 643 ft (196 m)

Population (2020)
  - Total: 10,080
  - Density: 428/sq mi (165.4/km^{2})
- Time zone: UTC-5 (Eastern (EST))
  - Summer (DST): UTC-4 (EDT)
- ZIP code: 44041
- Area code: 440
- FIPS code: 39-29624
- GNIS feature ID: 1085726
- Website: genevatownshipohio.gov

Geneva Township is one of the twenty-seven townships of Ashtabula County, Ohio. The 2020 census found 10,080 people in the township.

== Geography ==
Located in the northwestern corner of the county along Lake Erie, it borders the following townships:

- Saybrook Township (east)
- Austinburg Township (southeast corner)
- Harpersfield Township (south)
- Madison Township, Lake County (west)

The Canadian province of Ontario lies across Lake Erie to the north.

Two municipalities are located in Geneva Township: most of the city of Geneva in the south, and the village of Geneva-on-the-Lake in the north, on the shoreline of Lake Erie.

=== Major highways ===
- US 20
- SR 84
- SR 531
- SR 534

== Name and history ==
Named for the city of Geneva, New York, it is the only Geneva Township statewide.

Geneva Township was organized in 1816.

Geneva Township was described in 1833 as having one store, one gristmill, and three saw mills.

== Government ==
The township is governed by a three-member board of trustees, who are elected in November of odd-numbered years to a four-year term beginning on the following January 1. Two are elected in the year after the presidential election and one is elected in the year before it. There is also an elected township fiscal officer, who serves a four-year term beginning on April 1 of the year after the election, which is held in November of the year before the presidential election. Vacancies in the fiscal officership or on the board of trustees are filled by the remaining trustees. Currently, the board is composed of chairman Tim Mills and members Dennis Brown and Bob Russell.
