= Saybrook Township, Ashtabula County, Ohio =

Township in Ohio, US

- Township
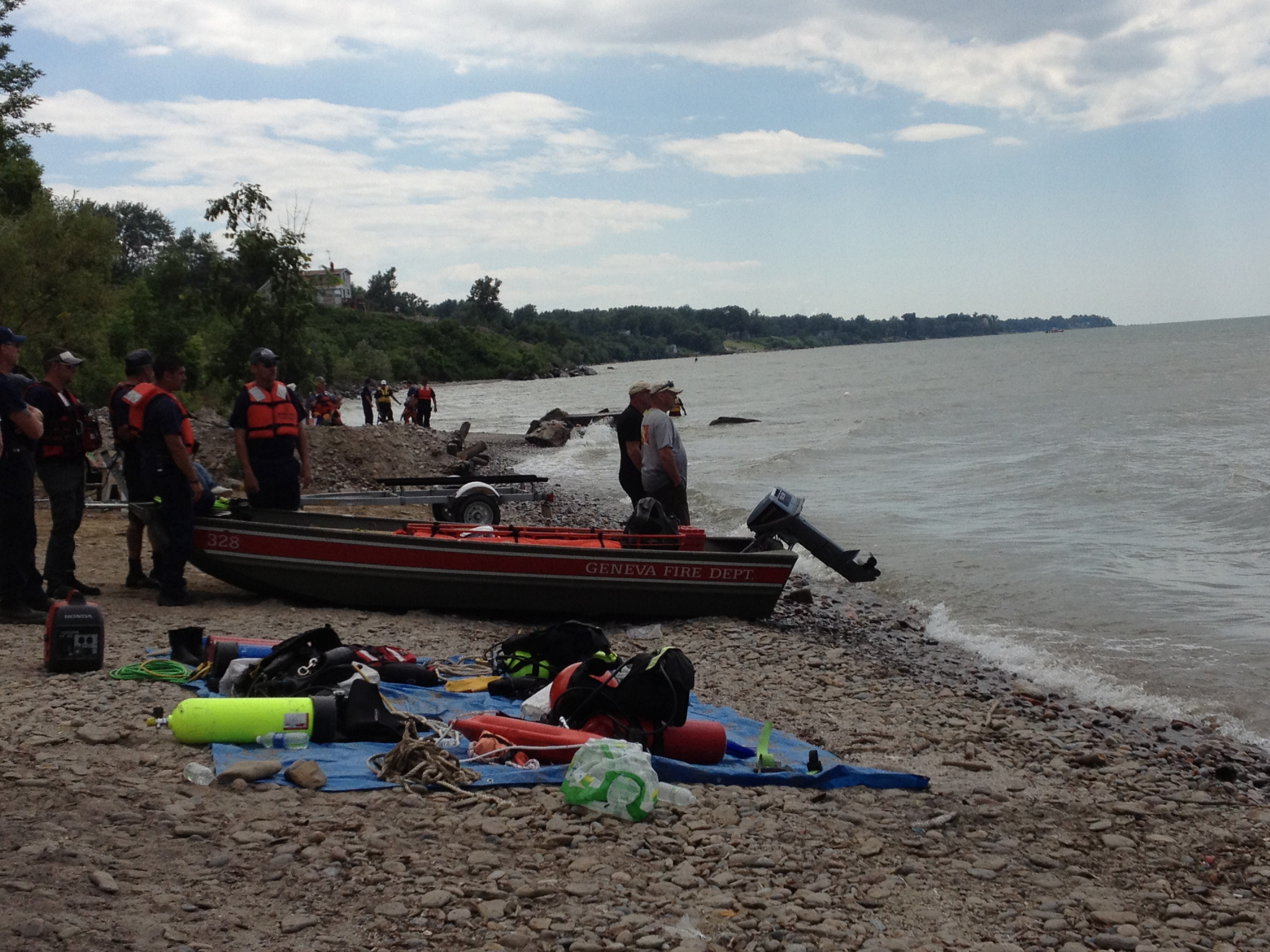
- Lake Erie shoreline with Coast Guard personnel

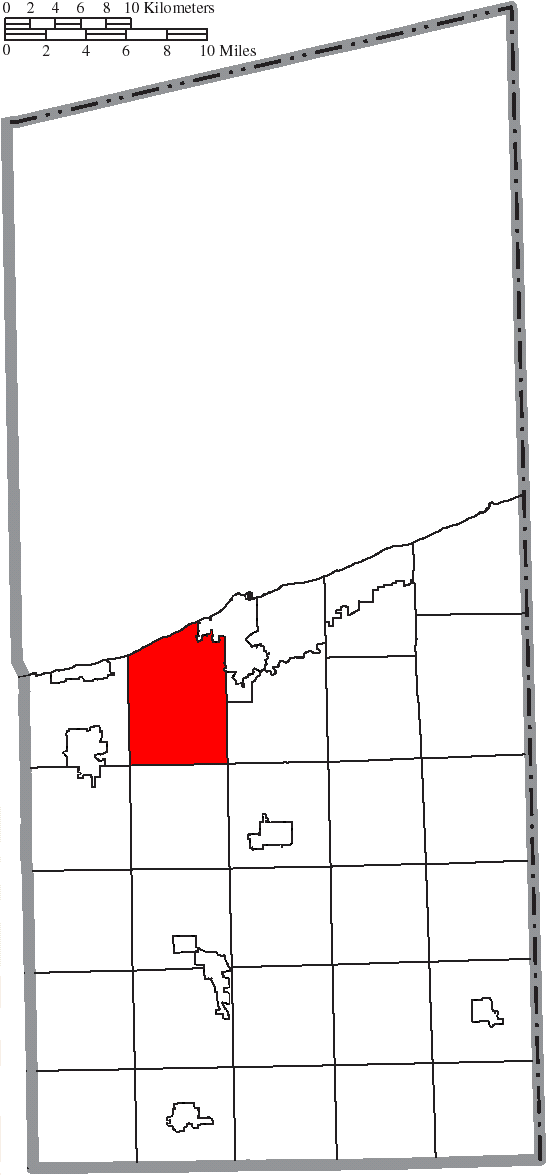
- Location of Saybrook Township in Ashtabula County
- Coordinates: 41°51′58″N 80°50′56″W
- Country: United States
- State: Ohio
- County: Ashtabula

Area
  - Total: 31.9 sq mi (82.5 km^{2})
  - Land: 31.8 sq mi (82.4 km^{2})
  - Water: 0.039 sq mi (0.1 km^{2})
- Elevation: 630 ft (192 m)

Population (2020)
  - Total: 9,711
  - Density: 305/sq mi (118/km^{2})
- Time zone: UTC-5 (Eastern (EST))
  - Summer (DST): UTC-4 (EDT)
- FIPS code: 39-70646
- GNIS feature ID: 1085742
- Website: www.saybrooktownship.org

Saybrook Township is one of the twenty-seven townships of Ashtabula County, Ohio, United States. The 2020 census found 9,711 people in the township.

== Geography ==
Located on the northeastern edge of the county along Lake Erie, it borders the following townships:

- Ashtabula Township - northeast
- Plymouth Township - east
- Jefferson Township - southeast corner
- Austinburg Township - south
- Harpersfield Township - southwest corner
- Geneva Township - west

The Canadian province of Ontario lies across Lake Erie to the north.

Part of the city of Ashtabula is located in northeastern Saybrook Township, along the shoreline of Lake Erie. The census-designated place of Saybrook-on-the-Lake is in the northwest part of the township.

== Name and history ==
Named for the Connecticut Saybrook Colony, it is the only Saybrook Township statewide.

Saybrook Township was originally part of Austinburg Township and contained a settlement called Wrightsburg. It was not until 1816 that modern Saybrook Township became a separate township of its own. The township and community continued to be called Wrightsburg until 1827 when the name was changed to Saybrook, its new name coming from Saybrook, Connecticut. The early settlers are listed in the 1820 census for Ashtabula County with the township recorded as Wrightsburg.

The Saybrook Township lands were originally owned by Connecticut Land Company investor William Hart. Hart then sold the entire township, with the exception of one lot, to Josiah Wright and his son Samuel Wright of Pownal, Vermont, in 1811. The deed for this sale is recorded in the Ashtabula County Courthouse in Jefferson, Ohio.

Even though the Wrights were early owners of Saybrook Township, they were not the first settlers. The first settler in Saybrook Township was George Webster, a New Yorker who came in 1810.

In 1833, Saybrook Township contained one store, three taverns, a saw mill, and a carding machine.

== Government ==
The township is governed by a three-member board of trustees, who are elected in November of odd-numbered years to a four-year term beginning on the following January 1. Two are elected in the year after the presidential election and one is elected in the year before it. There is also an elected township fiscal officer, who serves a four-year term beginning on April 1 of the year after the election, which is held in November of the year before the presidential election. Vacancies in the fiscal officership or on the board of trustees are filled by the remaining trustees. Currently, the board is composed of chairman Robert Brobst, Trustee Tom Pope and Trustee Dan Claypool.
