= Trumbull Township, Ashtabula County, Ohio =

Township in Ohio, US

- Township
- Logo
- Motto: "Where Liberty Lives"
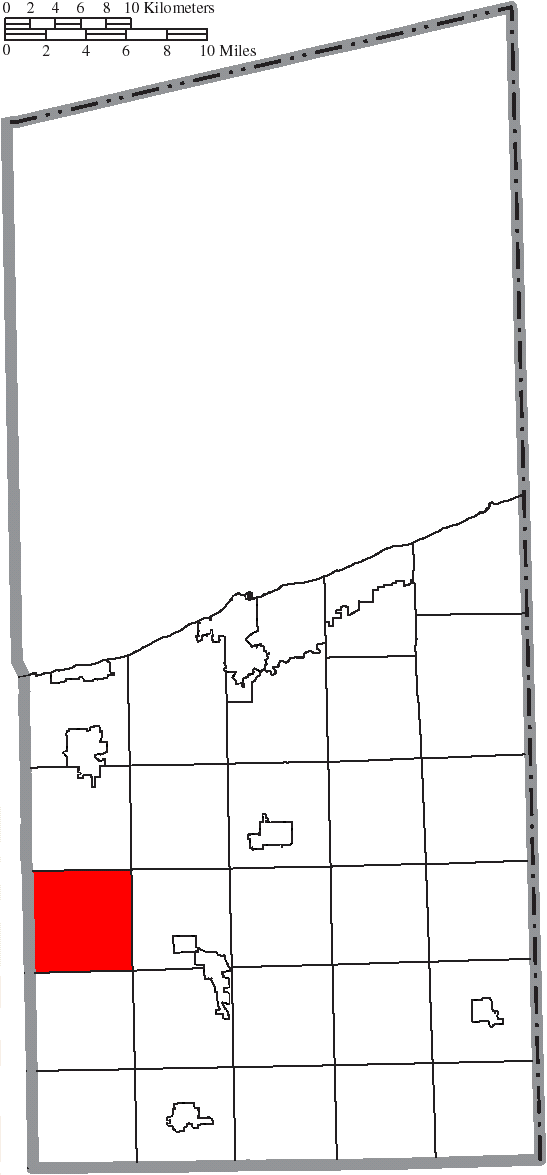
- Location of Trumbull Township in Ashtabula County
- Coordinates: 41°40′7″N 80°57′19″W
- Country: United States
- State: Ohio
- County: Ashtabula
- Organized: 1825

Area
  - Total: 25.7 sq mi (66.5 km^{2})
  - Land: 25.7 sq mi (66.5 km^{2})
  - Water: 0 sq mi (0.0 km^{2})
- Elevation: 1,004 ft (306 m)

Population (2020)
  - Total: 1,376
  - Density: 53.6/sq mi (20.7/km^{2})
- Time zone: UTC-5 (Eastern (EST))
  - Summer (DST): UTC-4 (EDT)
- FIPS code: 39-77686
- GNIS feature ID: 1085744
- Website: trumbulltownship.org

Trumbull Township is one of the twenty-seven townships of Ashtabula County, Ohio, United States. The 2020 census found 1,376 people in the township.

== Geography ==
Located on the western edge of the county, it borders the following townships:

- Harpersfield Township - north
- Austinburg Township - northeast corner
- Morgan Township - east
- Rome Township - southeast corner
- Hartsgrove Township - south
- Montville Township, Geauga County - southwest corner
- Thompson Township, Geauga County - west
- Madison Township, Lake County - northwest corner

No municipalities are located in Trumbull Township, although the unincorporated community of Footville lies in the township's southwest. Two other old unincorporated communities lie farther east: Center Trumbull and East Trumbull.

== Name and history ==
It is the only Trumbull Township statewide.

The first Euro-American settlers in what is now Trumbull Township were Holly and Hannah Tanner, who came from the town of Scipio, New York. Because they soon left, the first permanent resident was Daniel Woodruff, who came from New York in 1818.

Trumbull Township was organized in 1825.

== Government ==
The township is governed by a three-member board of trustees, who are elected in November of odd-numbered years to a four-year term beginning on the following January 1. Two are elected in the year after the presidential election and one is elected in the year before it. There is also an elected township fiscal officer, who serves a four-year term beginning on April 1 of the year after the election, which is held in November of the year before the presidential election. Vacancies in the fiscal officership or on the board of trustees are filled by the remaining trustees. Currently, the board is composed of chairman Mark Reed ll and members Lawrence Morse and Adam Niewiadomski.
