= Austinburg Township, Ohio =

Township in Ohio, US

Austinburg Township, Ashtabula County, Ohio
- Township
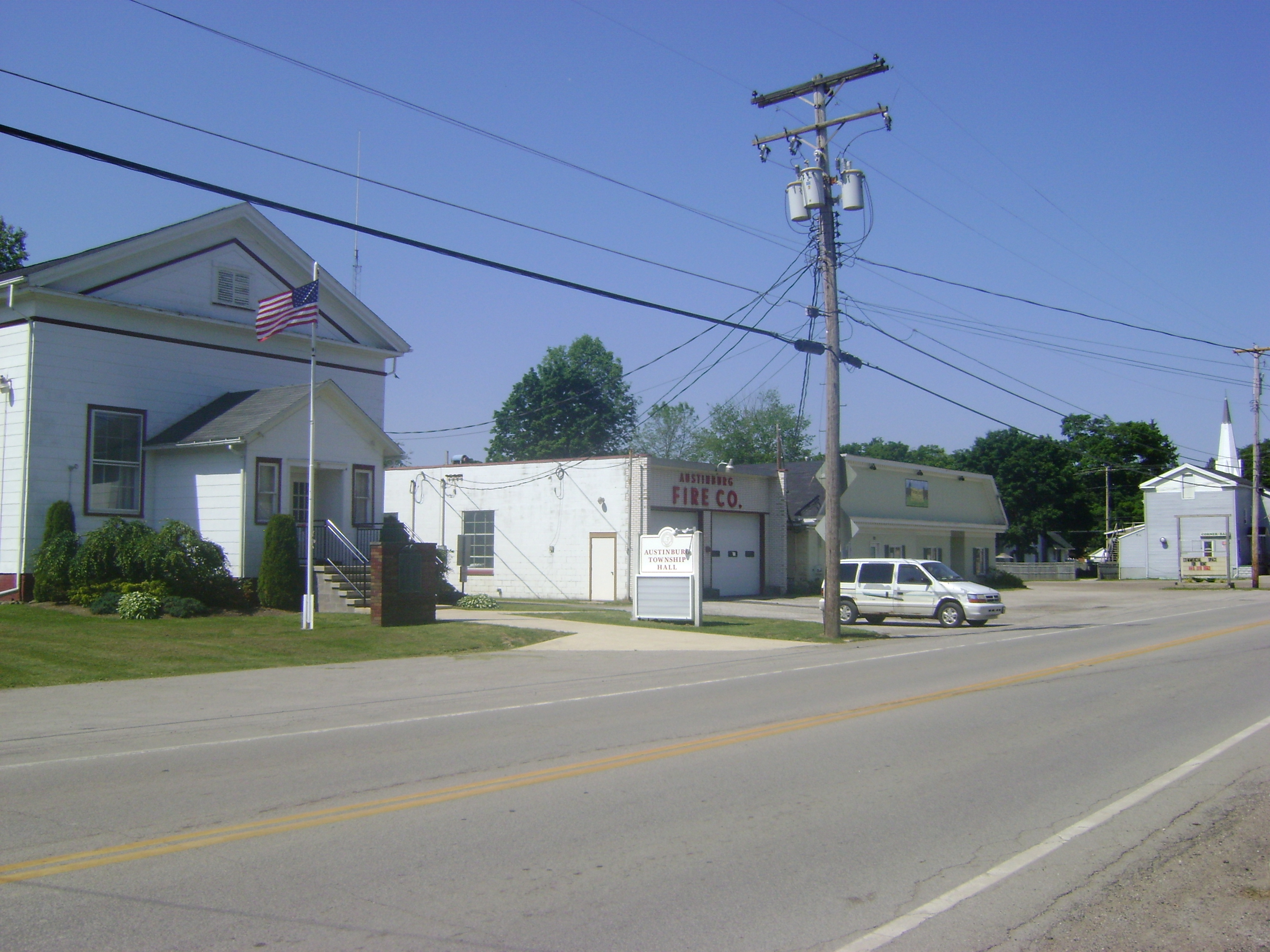
- Township building with fire department and church in the background

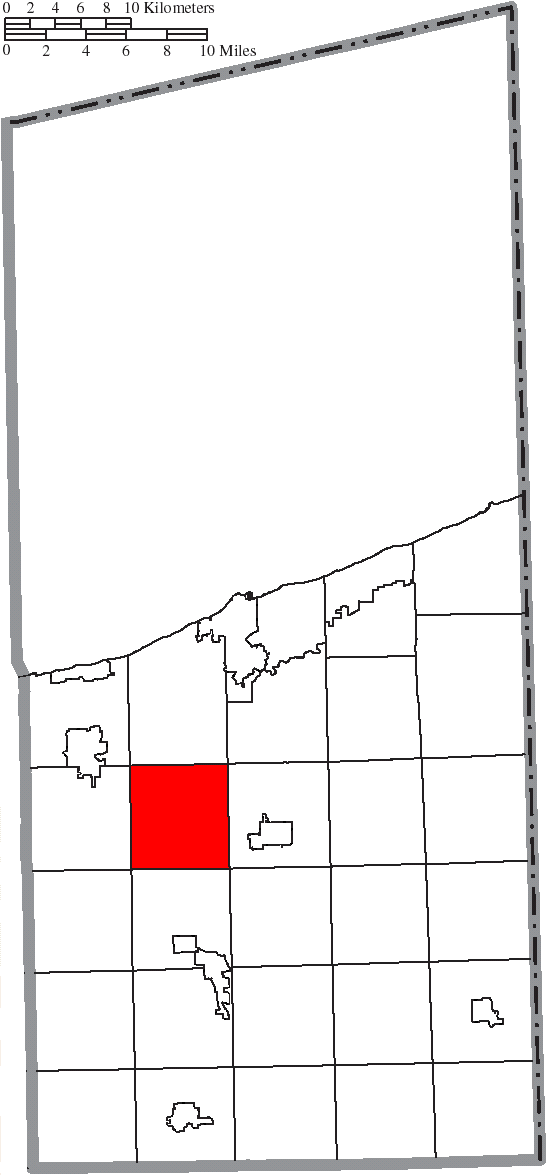
- Location of Austinburg Township in Ashtabula County
- Coordinates: 41°45′2″N 80°51′30″W
- Country: United States
- State: Ohio
- County: Ashtabula

Area
  - Total: 25.0 sq mi (64.7 km^{2})
  - Land: 24.8 sq mi (64.2 km^{2})
  - Water: 0.19 sq mi (0.5 km^{2})
- Elevation: 807 ft (246 m)

Population (2020)
  - Total: 2,240
  - Density: 89/sq mi (34.2/km^{2})
- Time zone: UTC-5 (Eastern (EST))
  - Summer (DST): UTC-4 (EDT)
- ZIP code: 44010
- Area code: 440
- FIPS code: 39-03156
- GNIS feature ID: 1085720
- Website: austinburg.org

Austinburg Township is one of the twenty-seven townships of Ashtabula County, Ohio, United States. The 2020 census found 2,240 people in the township. It is home to the Grand River Academy.

== Geography ==
Located in the northwestern part of the county, it borders the following townships:

- Saybrook Township - north
- Plymouth Township - northeast corner
- Jefferson Township - east
- Lenox Township - southeast corner
- Morgan Township - south
- Trumbull Township - southwest corner
- Harpersfield Township - west
- Geneva Township - northwest corner

No municipalities are located in Austinburg Township, although the unincorporated community of Austinburg lies in the township's north.

=== Major highways ===
- I-90
- SR 45
- SR 307

== Name and history ==
It is the only Austinburg Township statewide.

The township was first settled by several people from Connecticut, who arrived in 1799. During the Civil War, the township was a location on the Underground Railroad.

== Government ==
The township is governed by a three-member board of trustees, who are elected in November of odd-numbered years to a four-year term beginning on the following January 1. Two are elected in the year after the presidential election and one is elected in the year before it. There is also an elected township fiscal officer, who serves a four-year term beginning on April 1 of the year after the election, which is held in November of the year before the presidential election. Vacancies in the fiscal officership or on the board of trustees are filled by the remaining trustees.

== Notable people ==
- John Philo Hoyt - 4th Governor of Arizona Territory and speaker of Michigan House of Representatives
