= Austinburg, Ohio =

- Census-designated place
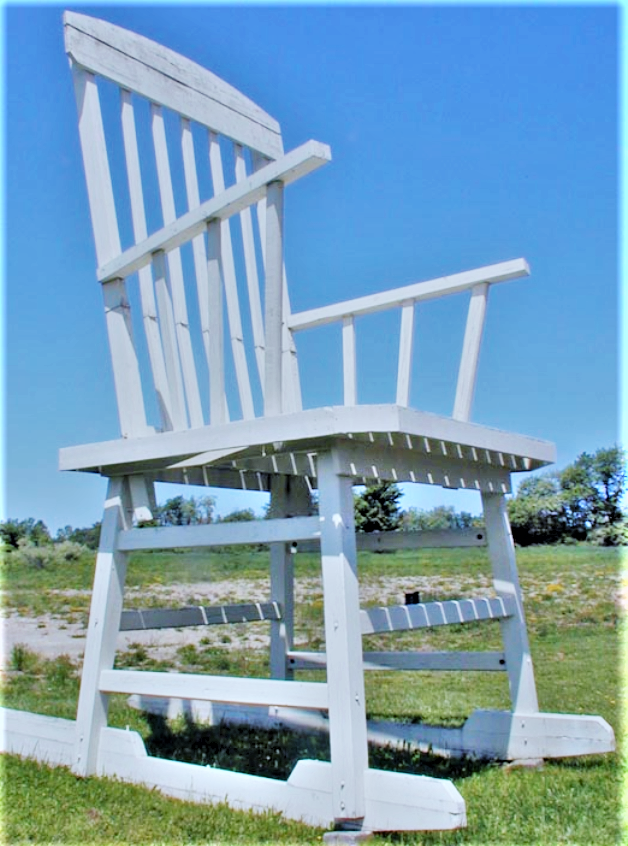
- A large wooden rocking chair painted white against a blue sky and grass

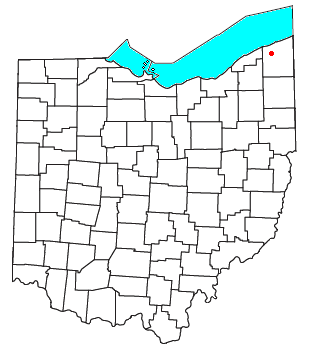
- Location of Austinburg, Ohio
- Coordinates: 41°45′50″N 80°51′56″W
- Country: United States
- State: Ohio
- County: Ashtabula
- Township: Austinburg
- Elevation: 794 ft (242 m)

Population (2020)
  - Total: 505
- Time zone: UTC-5 (Eastern (EST))
  - Summer (DST): UTC-4 (EDT)
- ZIP code: 44010
- Area code: 440
- GNIS feature ID: 2628860

Austinburg is a census-designated place in northern Austinburg Township, Ashtabula County, Ohio, United States. It lies at the intersection of State Routes 45 and 307. As of the 2020 census it had a population of 505, out of a total population of 2,197 in Austinburg Township. Austinburg was laid out ca. 1800 by Judge Eliphalet Austin, and named for him.

Austinburg is home to a large white wooden rocking chair, measuring approximately 25 feet tall.
