= Ashtabula County, Ohio =

County in Ohio, United States

- County
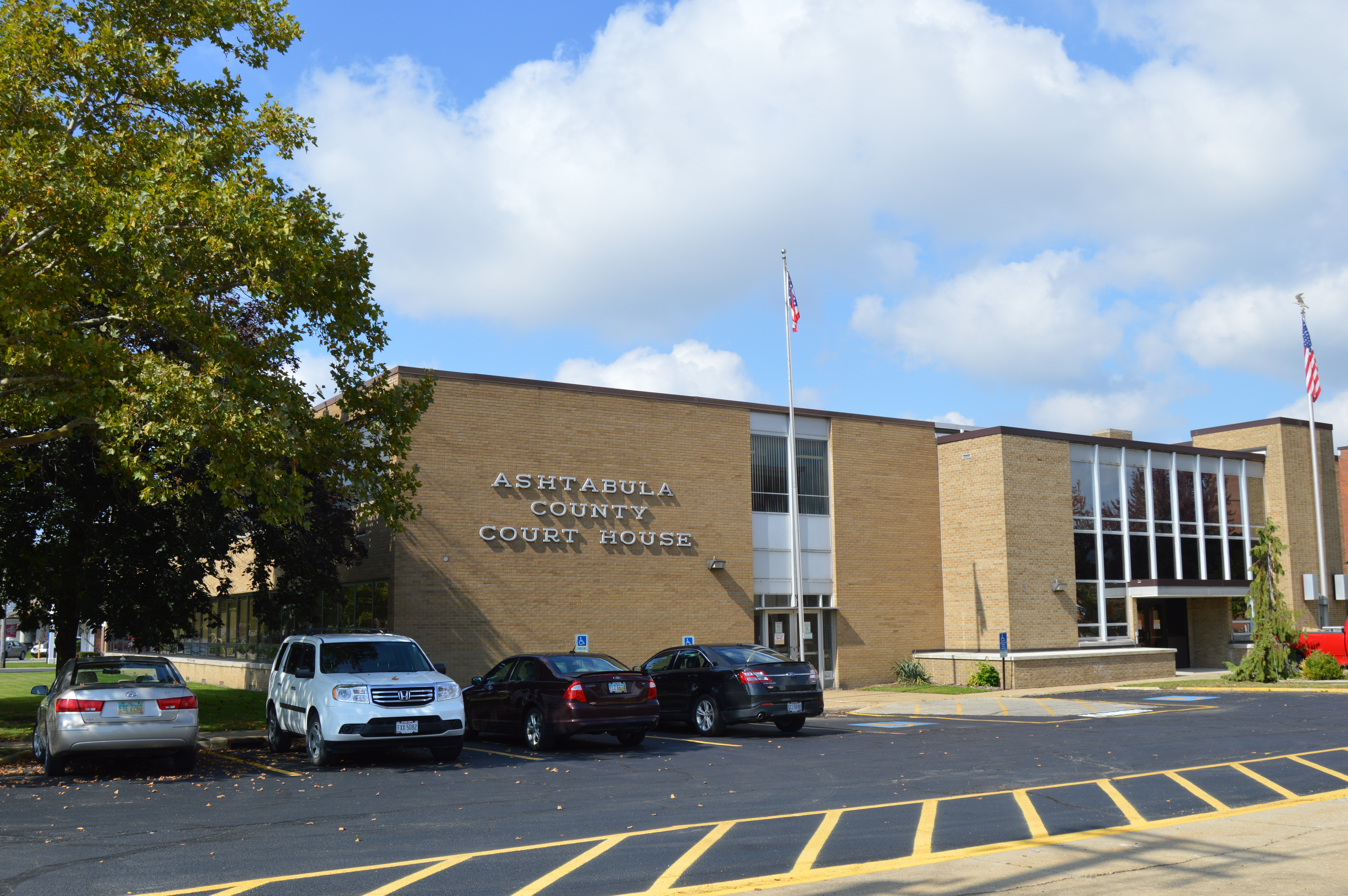
- Ashtabula County Courthouse

- Flag Seal Logo

- Location within the U.S. state of Ohio
- Coordinates: 41°53′N 80°46′W
- Country: United States
- State: Ohio
- Founded: May 1, 1811
- Named for: Lenape ashtepihële 'always enough fish to go around'
- Seat: Jefferson
- Largest city: Ashtabula

Area
  - Total: 1,368 sq mi (3,540 km^{2})
  - Land: 702 sq mi (1,820 km^{2})
  - Water: 666 sq mi (1,720 km^{2}) 49%

Population (2020)
  - Total: 97,574
  - Estimate (2025): 96,713 ▼
  - Density: 145.2/sq mi (56.1/km^{2})
- Time zone: UTC−5 (Eastern)
  - Summer (DST): UTC−4 (EDT)
- Congressional district: 14th
- Website: www.ashtabulacounty.us

Ashtabula County (/ˌæʃtəˈbjuːlə/ ASH-tə-BYU-lə) is the northeasternmost county in the U.S. state of Ohio. As of the 2020 census, the population was 97,574. The county seat is Jefferson, while its largest city is Ashtabula. The county was created in 1808 and later organized in 1811. The name Ashtabula derives from the Lenape language phrase ashte-pihële, which translates to 'always enough (fish) to go around, to be given away' and is a contraction of apchi ('always') + tepi ('enough') + hële (verb of motion). Ashtabula County is part of the Cleveland, OH Metropolitan Statistical Area.

The county is best known for having nineteen covered bridges within the county limits, including both the longest and the shortest covered bridges in the United States. Grapes are a popular crop and there are several award-winning wineries in the region due to the favorable microclimate from the nearby lake. During the winter, Ashtabula County (along with neighboring Geauga and Lake counties, as well as Crawford and Erie counties in neighboring Pennsylvania) receives frequent lake-effect snow and is part of the Southeastern Lake Erie Snowbelt.

== History ==
At the time of contact, Ashtabula County appears to have been divided between the Erie people in the east and the Whittlesey culture in the west. The Erie were an Iroquoian people, who were organized like the Iroquois, believed in a similar religion and lived in longhouses in palisaded villages and may have had a burial ground at what is now Erie, PA, whereas the uncontacted Whittlesey are mostly believed to have been Algonquians, who also lived in longhouses at the time of contact (after having gone through prior periods of living in wigwams and Fort Ancient style houses) in villages surrounded by earthen berm walls and had smaller, local burial grounds near each settlement. The French were the first to explore the Great Lakes by ship and, having never met the inhabitants, saw the continuation of longhouses and mistakenly assumed the entire region had belonged to the Erie. Both tribes were likely eradicated by the Iroquois Confederacy during the Beaver Wars (approx. 1630–1701), which later bled into the first of the myriad conflicts collectively called the French-Indian Wars, probably specifically some time during the 1650s. The Jesuit Relations claim rumors of infighting between the Erie and an unknown nation to the west of them who were similar to other Algonquian peoples the French had already encountered in the years prior to both tribes' eradication. Three known village sites have been documented by archaeologists from this period in Windsor (located inside what is now a private children's Summer Camp) and two at Conneaut. Following the Beaver Wars, and the first conflict of the French-Indian Wars coming to an end in 1701, an official border between England and France was established at what is now the Ohio-PA border, leading to English forts being erected all along the Pennsylvania side that became crucial in the later conflicts of the French-Indian Wars over the next 50 years.

After Europeans arrived in the Americas, the land that became Ashtabula County was originally part of the French colony of Illinois Country, which was ceded in 1764 to Great Britain, along with the rest of Canada (New France) and incorporated into the Province of Quebec, though generally came to be referred to as Ohio Country. The Iroquois placed a vassal tribe of mostly captured Hurons in the region, who later broke free of their control when the French pushed Iroquois and English influence from the area in the 1690s. This group, known as the Wyandot, later ceded settlement of most of the territory roughly between what is now Cleveland, Akron, the Mahoning River and the Ohio-PA border to be a common hunting ground, shared by themselves, the Seneca, Shawnee, Lenape and even the Ottawa, or Mississauga, who lived at the western end of Lake Erie, at the time. The Ottawa were the only residents, who maintained two known hunting camps in Ashtabula County- one at Conneaut, and the other at Andover. The Lenape maintained a handful of villages in western Pennsylvania and one at Youngstown, in Mahoning County. After the end of the Northwest Indian War, (a conflict which erupted shortly after the American Revolution between the fledgling United States and all the remaining tribes of the Great Lakes region in territory the US claimed) in the 1790s, the Natives were made to turn over ownership of the area to the US via the Treaty of Greenville, and the remaining Ottawa residents were evicted. That being said, early settlers recalled that some of the Ottawa remained in the region for an additional thirty years, having been sighted all over Trumbull, Geauga and Portage Counties until sometime around the War of 1812, along with Senecas who lived around Streetsboro. Those in Trumbull County usually had three men who normally spoke interchangeably for them as chief- Kiogg, Paqua and Cadashaway, whereas the Seneca were under a man named Bigson, and later a relative of his named Nickashaw. The area was traversed several times during the period of the French-Indian Wars by the English, including the group led by Major Robert Rodgers, who ultimately convinced Chief Pontiac to switch sides from the French to the English.

In the late 18th century, the land became part of the Connecticut Western Reserve in the Northwest Territory, then was purchased by the Connecticut Land Company in 1795, culminating in the settlement of the first American residents in the region. It was created from Geauga County and a small portion of northern Trumbull County.

During the pre-Civil War period, the entire Western Reserve area of Ohio was anti-slavery, but Ashtabula County was at the center of the resistance. John Brown's eldest son, John Jr., lived in the county for years, and his brother Owen took refuge with him when Virginia was seeking to extradite him for his role in the raid on Harpers Ferry. An armed group of 200 made them safer than anywhere in the U.S., they said, or even Canada. Dangerfield Newby met John Brown in Ashtabula County.

== Geography ==
Seal of the Ashtabula County Auditor

According to the U.S. Census Bureau, the county has a total area of 1,368 square miles (3,540 km^{2}), of which 702 square miles (1,820 km^{2}) is land and 666 square miles (1,720 km^{2}) (49%) is water. It is the largest county in Ohio by area.

=== Adjacent counties ===
Across Lake Erie lie Elgin and Norfolk Counties, Ontario, Canada (north).

- Erie County, Pennsylvania (northeast)
- Crawford County, Pennsylvania (east)
- Trumbull County (south)
- Geauga County (southwest)
- Lake County (west)

=== Major highways ===
- I-90
- US 6
- US 20
- US 322
- SR 7
- SR 11
- SR 45
- SR 46
- SR 84
- SR 85
- SR 86
- SR 167
- SR 193
- SR 307
- SR 531
- SR 534

== Demographics ==
Historical population
Census	Pop.	Note	%±
1820	7,382		—
1830	14,584		97.6%
1840	23,724		62.7%
1850	28,767		21.3%
1860	31,814		10.6%
1870	32,517		2.2%
1880	37,139		14.2%
1890	43,655		17.5%
1900	51,448		17.9%
1910	59,547		15.7%
1920	65,545		10.1%
1930	68,631		4.7%
1940	68,674		0.1%
1950	78,695		14.6%
1960	93,067		18.3%
1970	98,237		5.6%
1980	104,215		6.1%
1990	99,821		−4.2%
2000	102,728		2.9%
2010	101,497		−1.2%
2020	97,574		−3.9%
2025 (est.)	96,713	▼	−0.9%
U.S. Decennial Census; 1790–1960 1900–90; 1990–2000 2020 2025

=== 2020 census ===
As of the 2020 census, the county had a population of 97,574 and a median age of 43.6 years.

21.7% of residents were under the age of 18 and 20.5% were 65 years of age or older, while for every 100 females there were 101.6 males and for every 100 females age 18 and over there were 100.8 males.

The racial makeup of the county was 87.6% White, 3.7% Black or African American, 0.2% American Indian and Alaska Native, 0.4% Asian, <0.1% Native Hawaiian and Pacific Islander, 1.7% from some other race, and 6.4% from two or more races. Hispanic or Latino residents of any race comprised 4.6% of the population.

48.0% of residents lived in urban areas, while 52.0% lived in rural areas.

There were 39,329 households in the county, of which 26.7% had children under the age of 18 living in them. Of all households, 44.4% were married-couple households, 20.1% were households with a male householder and no spouse or partner present, and 26.7% were households with a female householder and no spouse or partner present. About 30.4% of all households were made up of individuals and 14.2% had someone living alone who was 65 years of age or older.

There were 46,237 housing units, of which 14.9% were vacant. Among occupied housing units, 71.0% were owner-occupied and 29.0% were renter-occupied. The homeowner vacancy rate was 1.7% and the rental vacancy rate was 7.9%.

=== Racial and ethnic composition ===
Ashtabula County, Ohio – Racial and ethnic composition Note: the US Census treats Hispanic/Latino as an ethnic category. This table excludes Latinos from the racial categories and assigns them to a separate category. Hispanics/Latinos may be of any race.
Race / ethnicity (NH = Non-Hispanic)	Pop 1980	Pop 1990	Pop 2000	Pop 2010	Pop 2020	% 1980	% 1990	% 2000	% 2010	% 2020
White alone (NH)	99,438	94,579	95,484	92,126	84,064	95.42%	94.75%	92.95%	90.77%	86.15%
Black or African American alone (NH)	3,015	3,099	3,165	3,467	3,492	2.89%	3.10%	3.08%	3.42%	3.58%
Native American or Alaska Native alone (NH)	160	184	177	208	154	0.15%	0.18%	0.17%	0.20%	0.16%
Asian alone (NH)	317	338	332	372	338	0.30%	0.34%	0.32%	0.37%	0.35%
Native Hawaiian or Pacific Islander alone (NH)	x	x	23	17	12	x	x	0.02%	0.02%	0.01%
Other race alone (NH)	166	83	59	36	260	0.16%	0.08%	0.06%	0.04%	0.27%
Mixed race or Multiracial (NH)	x	x	1,196	1,830	4,765	x	x	1.16%	1.80%	4.88%
Hispanic or Latino (any race)	1,119	1,538	2,292	3,441	4,489	1.07%	1.54%	2.23%	3.39%	4.60%
Total	104,215	99,821	102,728	101,497	97,574	100.00%	100.00%	100.00%	100.00%	100.00%

=== 2010 census ===
As of the 2010 United States census, there were 101,497 people, 39,363 households, and 26,495 families residing in the county. The population density was 144.6 inhabitants per square mile (55.8/km^{2}). There were 46,099 housing units at an average density of 65.7 units per square mile (25.4 units/km^{2}). The racial makeup of the county was 92.7% white, 3.5% black or African American, 0.4% Asian, 0.2% American Indian, 1.1% from other races, and 2.1% from two or more races. Those of Hispanic or Latino origin made up 3.4% of the population. In terms of ancestry, 24.9% were German, 15.8% were Irish, 12.6% were English, 11.1% were Italian, 10.0% were American, and 5.8% were Polish.

Of the 39,363 households, 31.3% had children under the age of 18 living with them, 49.2% were married couples living together, 12.4% had a female householder with no husband present, 32.7% were non-families, and 26.9% of all households were made up of individuals. The average household size was 2.50 and the average family size was 3.01. The median age was 41.0 years.

The median income for a household in the county was $42,139 and the median income for a family was $50,227. Males had a median income of $40,879 versus $30,156 for females. The per capita income for the county was $19,898. About 11.8% of families and 15.7% of the population were below the poverty line, including 21.7% of those under age 18 and 9.2% of those age 65 or over.

=== 2000 census ===
As of the census of 2000, there were 102,728 people, 39,397 households, and 27,774 families residing in the county. The population density was 146 inhabitants per square mile (56/km^{2}). There were 43,792 housing units at an average density of 62 units per square mile (24/km^{2}). The racial makeup of the county was 94.07% White, 3.16% Black or African American, 0.19% Native American, 0.34% Asian, 0.02% Pacific Islander, 0.85% from other races, and 1.36% from two or more races. 2.23% of the population were Hispanic or Latino of any race. 19.3% were of German, 11.6% Italian, 10.6% English, 10.5% Irish, and 10.3% American ancestry according to Census 2000. 95.2% spoke English, 2.4% Spanish, and 0.8% German as their first language.

There were 39,397 households, out of which 32.40% had children under the age of 18 living with them, 54.80% were married couples living together, 11.40% had a female householder with no husband present, and 29.50% were non-families. 24.80% of all households were made up of individuals, and 10.70% had someone living alone who was 65 years of age or older. The average household size was 2.56 and the average family size was 3.05.

In the county, the population was spread out, with 26.20% under the age of 18, 7.60% from 18 to 24, 28.00% from 25 to 44, 23.60% from 45 to 64, and 14.70% who were 65 years of age or older. The median age was 38 years. For every 100 females there were 95.10 males. For every 100 females age 18 and over, there were 92.10 males.

The median income for a household in the county was $35,607, and the median income for a family was $42,449. Males had a median income of $33,105 versus $22,624 for females. The per capita income for the county was $16,814. About 9.20% of families and 12.10% of the population were below the poverty line, including 17.10% of those under age 18 and 8.60% of those age 65 or over.

== Politics ==
Ashtabula County voted for the Democratic candidate for president in every election between 1988 and 2012. Prior to that, however, no fewer than 19 Republican candidates won the county with greater than 61% of the vote.

In 2016, Republican Donald Trump carried the county with 56.6%. The county swung 32 percentage points from 2012 to 2016.

In 2020, Trump increased this to 60.8%. In 2024, Trump won 63.5% of the vote, the highest for a Republican since 1956.

United States presidential election results for Ashtabula County, Ohio
Year	Republican		Democratic		Third party(ies)	
Year	No.	%	No.	%	No.	%
1856	5,108	80.63%	975	15.39%	252	3.98%
1860	5,566	81.15%	860	12.54%	433	6.31%
1864	6,045	85.30%	1,042	14.70%	0	0.00%
1868	6,108	81.35%	1,400	18.65%	0	0.00%
1872	5,764	76.96%	1,678	22.40%	48	0.64%
1876	6,771	74.31%	2,294	25.18%	47	0.52%
1880	6,926	72.88%	2,286	24.06%	291	3.06%
1884	7,269	69.41%	2,643	25.24%	560	5.35%
1888	7,164	67.39%	2,675	25.16%	792	7.45%
1892	6,419	63.57%	2,769	27.42%	910	9.01%
1896	8,557	67.70%	3,840	30.38%	242	1.91%
1900	9,272	70.70%	3,438	26.21%	405	3.09%
1904	8,906	75.89%	1,647	14.03%	1,182	10.07%
1908	8,213	63.32%	3,572	27.54%	1,185	9.14%
1912	2,214	17.99%	3,181	25.84%	6,913	56.17%
1916	6,608	52.34%	5,306	42.02%	712	5.64%
1920	14,099	69.70%	5,413	26.76%	717	3.54%
1924	14,767	69.21%	2,135	10.01%	4,435	20.79%
1928	18,870	75.13%	5,951	23.69%	297	1.18%
1932	15,644	55.31%	11,386	40.26%	1,252	4.43%
1936	14,025	46.73%	14,468	48.21%	1,517	5.05%
1940	18,491	56.13%	14,454	43.87%	0	0.00%
1944	17,181	56.33%	13,319	43.67%	0	0.00%
1948	15,389	54.33%	12,560	44.34%	377	1.33%
1952	23,185	61.24%	14,676	38.76%	0	0.00%
1956	24,165	64.68%	13,195	35.32%	0	0.00%
1960	22,406	53.91%	19,155	46.09%	0	0.00%
1964	13,183	35.36%	24,104	64.64%	0	0.00%
1968	17,058	46.66%	16,738	45.79%	2,759	7.55%
1972	22,762	58.96%	15,052	38.99%	794	2.06%
1976	16,885	43.72%	20,883	54.07%	857	2.22%
1980	19,847	49.04%	17,363	42.91%	3,257	8.05%
1984	21,669	52.34%	19,344	46.73%	384	0.93%
1988	17,654	45.79%	20,536	53.26%	366	0.95%
1992	13,254	30.80%	18,843	43.79%	10,931	25.40%
1996	13,287	34.31%	19,341	49.95%	6,094	15.74%
2000	17,940	45.45%	19,831	50.24%	1,701	4.31%
2004	21,038	46.33%	24,060	52.99%	309	0.68%
2008	18,949	42.04%	25,027	55.52%	1,100	2.44%
2012	18,298	42.36%	23,803	55.10%	1,099	2.54%
2016	23,318	56.62%	15,577	37.83%	2,285	5.55%
2020	26,890	60.79%	16,497	37.29%	850	1.92%
2024	27,656	63.47%	15,345	35.22%	574	1.32%

United States Senate election results for Ashtabula County, Ohio1
Year	Republican		Democratic		Third party(ies)	
Year	No.	%	No.	%	No.	%
2024	24,117	56.50%	16,785	39.33%	1,780	4.17%

== Culture ==
Ashtabula County (along with neighboring Lake County) fostered a very large Finnish American community around the turn of the twentieth century, and as a result, the area is home to many Finnish Americans.

Ashtabula County has eighteen extant covered bridges. Of these, nine were constructed prior to 1900. See List of Ashtabula County covered bridges.

== Communities ==
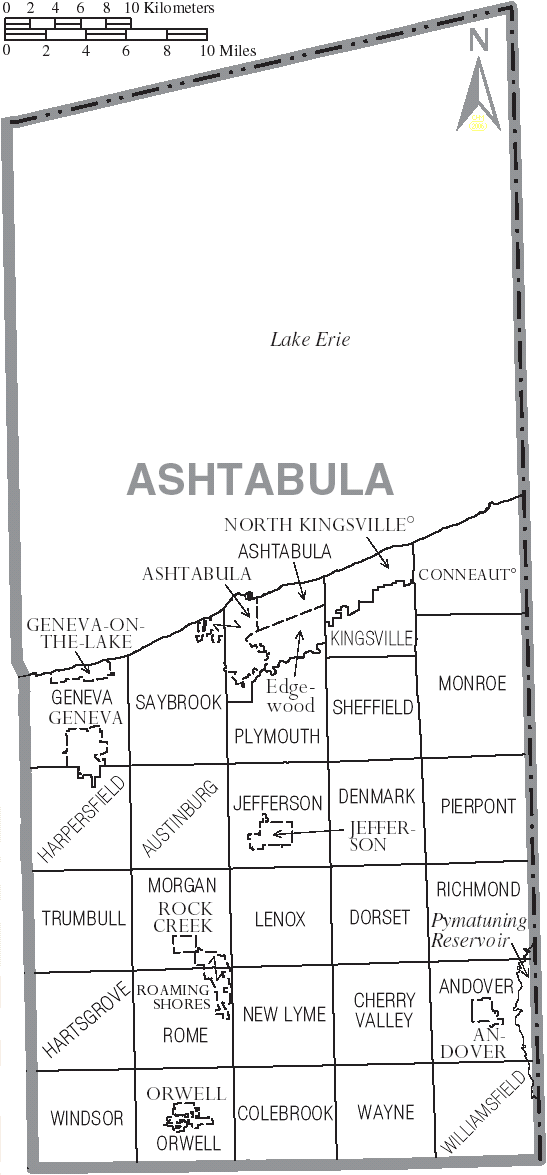
Map of Ashtabula County, Ohio with Municipal and Township Labels

=== Cities ===
- Ashtabula
- Conneaut
- Geneva

=== Villages ===
- Andover
- Geneva-on-the-Lake
- Jefferson (county seat)
- North Kingsville
- Orwell
- Roaming Shores
- Rock Creek

=== Townships ===
- Andover
- Ashtabula
- Austinburg
- Cherry Valley
- Colebrook
- Conneaut
- Denmark
- Dorset
- Geneva
- Harpersfield
- Hartsgrove
- Jefferson
- Kingsville
- Lenox
- Monroe
- Morgan
- New Lyme
- Orwell
- Pierpont
- Plymouth
- Richmond
- Rome
- Saybrook
- Sheffield
- Trumbull
- Wayne
- Williamsfield
- Windsor

=== Census-designated places ===
- Austinburg
- Edgewood
- Kingsville
- Saybrook-on-the-Lake

=== Unincorporated communities ===
- Cherry Valley
- Dorset
- Eagleville
- Footville
- Kelloggsville
- Pierpont
- Unionville
- West Andover
- Williamsfield
- Windsor

== Notable people ==
- Chester H. Aldrich (1862–1924), governor of Nebraska 1911-1913
- Brian Anderson, Cleveland Indians pitcher, originally from Geneva
- John Brown Junior (1821–1895), son of the abolitionist John Brown, lived in Ashtabula County during the Civil War period, and his brother Owen (1824–1889) took refuge with him..
- Charles Case (1817–1883), born in Austinburg, United States congressman from Indiana
- Tammy Cochran, country music singer from Austinburg; biggest hit was "Angels in Waiting"
- Edwin Cowles (1825–1890), born in Austinburg, publisher of The Cleveland Leader, vice-president of the 1884 Republican National Convention
- Charles DeBarber, a cyber intelligence analyst on CBS's Hunted (2017 TV series)
- Joshua Reed Giddings (1795–1864), member of the U.S. House of Representatives and prominent opponent of slavery
- Rosetta Luce Gilchrist (1850-1921), physician, writer, president of the Ashtabula Equal Rights Club
- Francis Joseph Hall, was an American Protestant Episcopal theologian and author.
- Ken Meyer, head coach of the National Football League's San Francisco 49ers in 1977
- Urban Meyer, head football coach at the University of Florida (2005-2010), head football coach at The Ohio State University (2012-2018), head coach of the National Football League's Jacksonville Jaguars (2021–2021)
- James Montgomery, (1814–1871), born in Ashtabula County, colonel in the American Civil War, raided several towns in Missouri and the American South
- Dangerfield Newby (c. 1820–1859), a freed slave who was killed during John Brown's raid on Harpers Ferry.
- Danielle Nicolet, television, film, and voice actress born in Ashtabula
- Larry Obhof, attorney and former President of the Ohio Senate
- Ransom Eli Olds, pioneer of the American automobile industry, for whom both the Oldsmobile and Reo brands were named
- Glenn W. Salisbury, agricultural scientist
- Louis C. Shepard, American Civil War Medal of Honor recipient from Ashtabula County, buried in Lakeview Cemetery, Port Clinton, Ottawa County, Ohio
- Decius Wade, attorney, judge, writer, and politician who has been called the "Father of Montana Jurisprudence" for his role in establishing the common law and statutory law of the U.S. state of Montana
- Clarence Darrow, American lawyer who became famous in the early 20th century for his involvement in the Leopold and Loeb murder trial and the Scopes "Monkey" Trial.
- Connie Schultz, an American writer and journalist and wife of United States Senator Sherrod Brown.
- Doug Tompkins, co-founder of The North Face and Esprit

== See also ==
- National Register of Historic Places listings in Ashtabula County, Ohio
