= Sheffield Township, Ohio =

Sheffield Township, Ohio may refer to:

- Sheffield Township, Ashtabula County, Ohio
- Sheffield Township, Lorain County, Ohio
