= Richmond Township, Ohio =

Richmond Township, Ohio may refer to:

- Richmond Township, Ashtabula County, Ohio
- Richmond Township, Huron County, Ohio
