= Clearview Local School District =

School district in Ohio

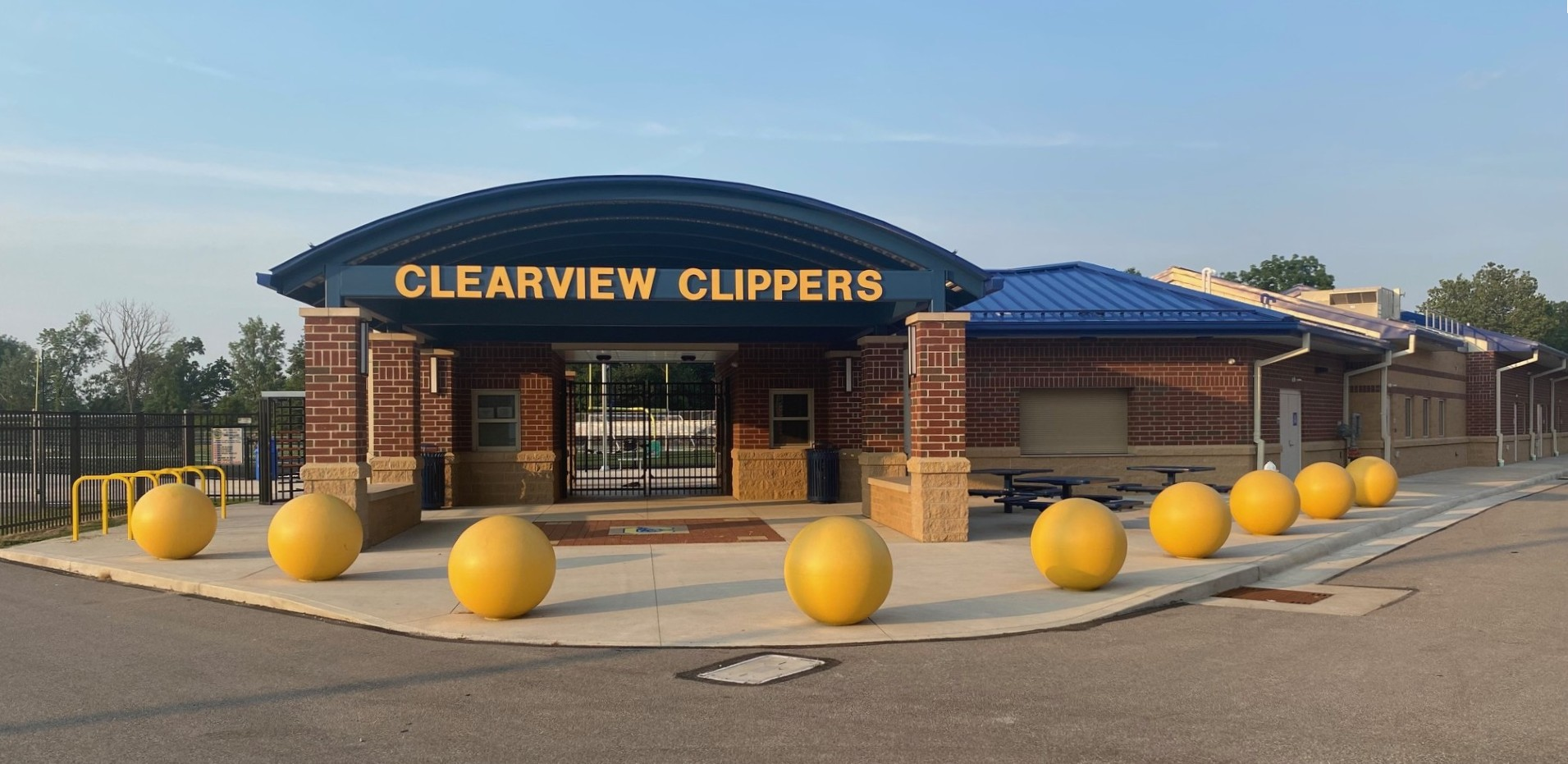

Address
- 4700 Broadway Avenue Lorain, Ohio, 44052; United States
- Coordinates: 41°25′31″N 82°09′51″W

District information
- Grades: K–12
- Established: April 9, 1928; 97 years ago
- Superintendent: Jerome Davis
- NCES District ID: 3904813

Students and staff
- Enrollment: 1,498 (2020-2021)
- Staff: 91.00 (on an FTE basis)
- Student–teacher ratio: 16.46
- District mascot: Clippers
- Colors: Blue & Gold

Other information
- Website: www.clearview.k12.oh.us

Clearview Local School District was formed on and serves students from Sheffield Township, Ohio and part of Lorain, Ohio. Clearview has three school buildings. Vincent Elementary houses K-4 and was built in the 1912, Durling Middle School houses 5-8 and was built in 1952 and Clearview High School houses 9-12 and was built in 1923. In 2004 all three buildings were greatly renovated and expanded, thanks to the Ohio School Facilities Commission 23 million dollars. At Vincent and Clearview all the older sections were demolished and made way for new classrooms.
