= Dorset, Ohio =

Unincorporated community in Ohio, U.S.

Coordinates: 41°40′49″N 80°40′02″W

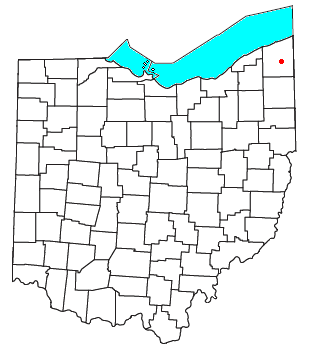
Location of Dorset, Ohio

Dorset is an unincorporated community in central Dorset Township, Ashtabula County, Ohio, United States. It has a post office with the ZIP code 44032. It lies along State Route 193.

Dorset was originally named Millsford, and under the latter name was founded in 1828. The present name is after Dorset, Vermont, the native home of an early settler.

John Brown Junior, son of John Brown the abolitionist, lived in Dorset from approximately 1855 to 1885.

== Historical photos ==
Click to view the historical photos.

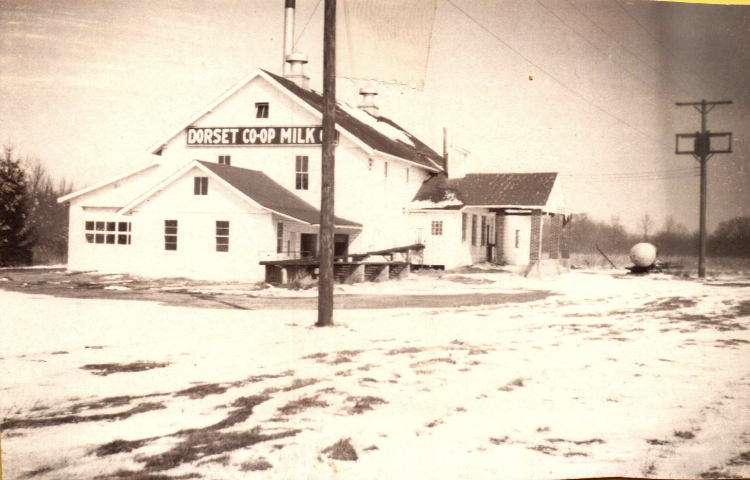
Milk factory in Dorset, located at the intersection of Footville Richmond Road and State Route 307, on the east side of Mill Creek.

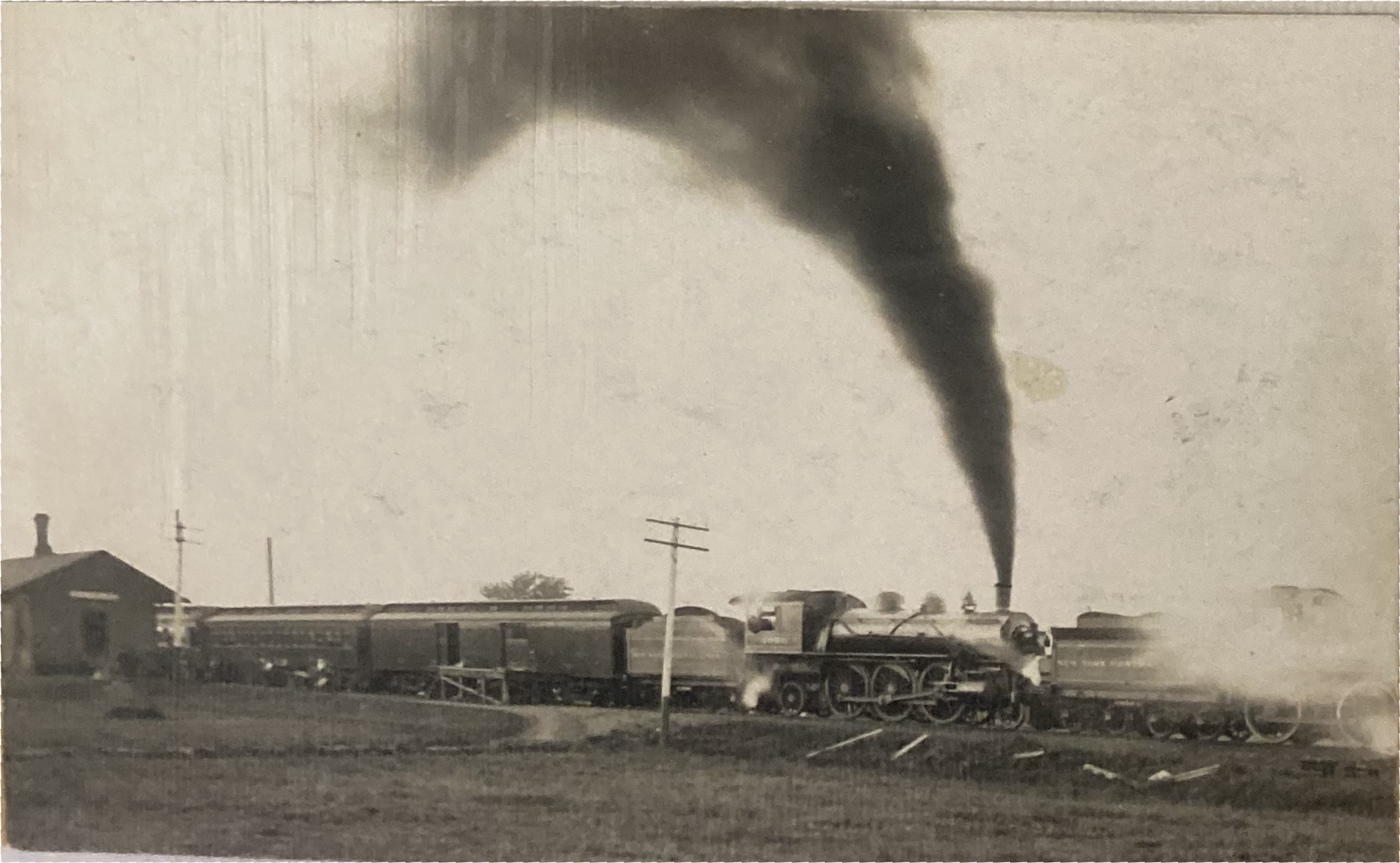
Train at Dorset Station in Dorset

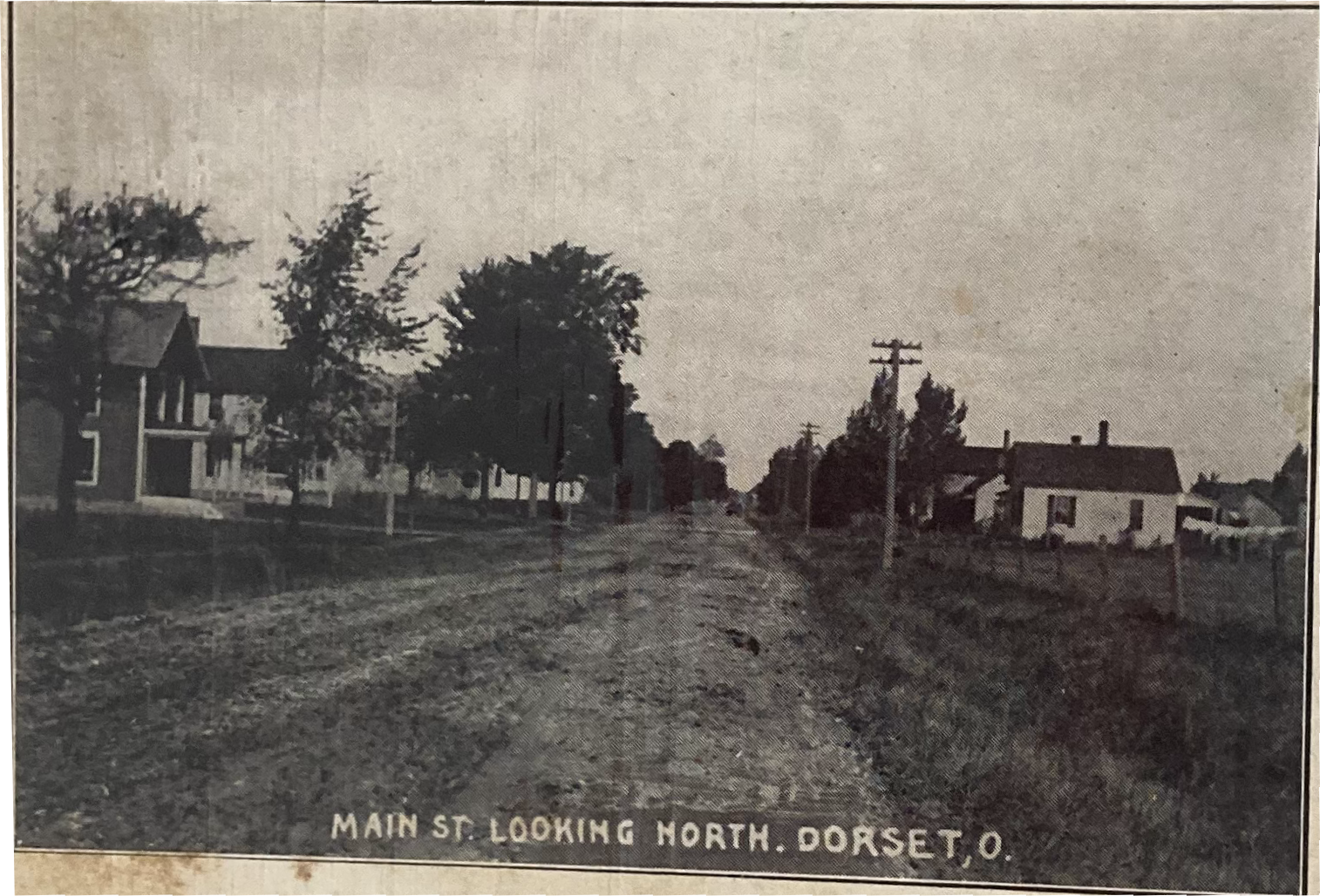
North on 193 in Dorset

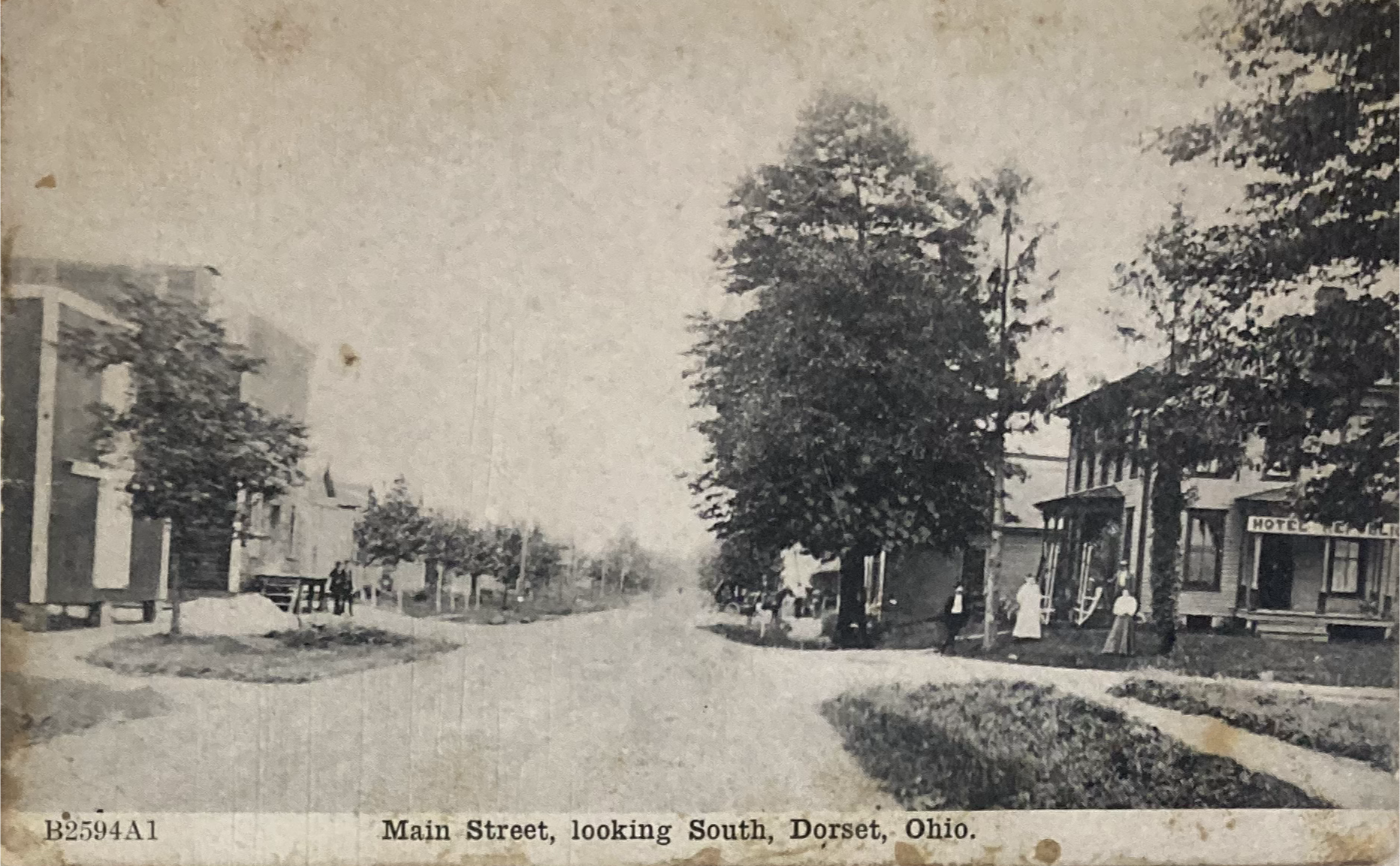
Mill and Hotel in Dorset

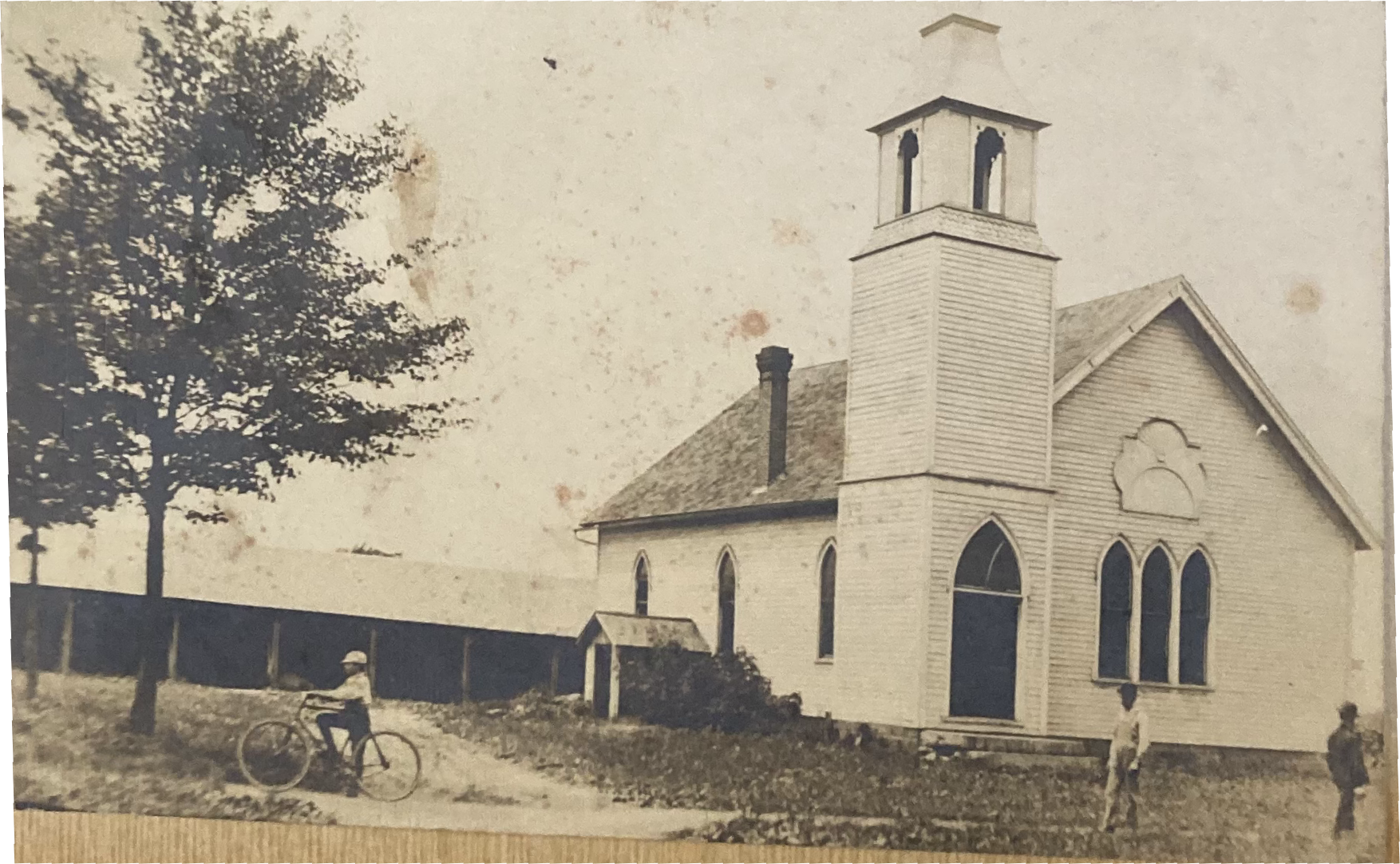
Dorset Baptist Church

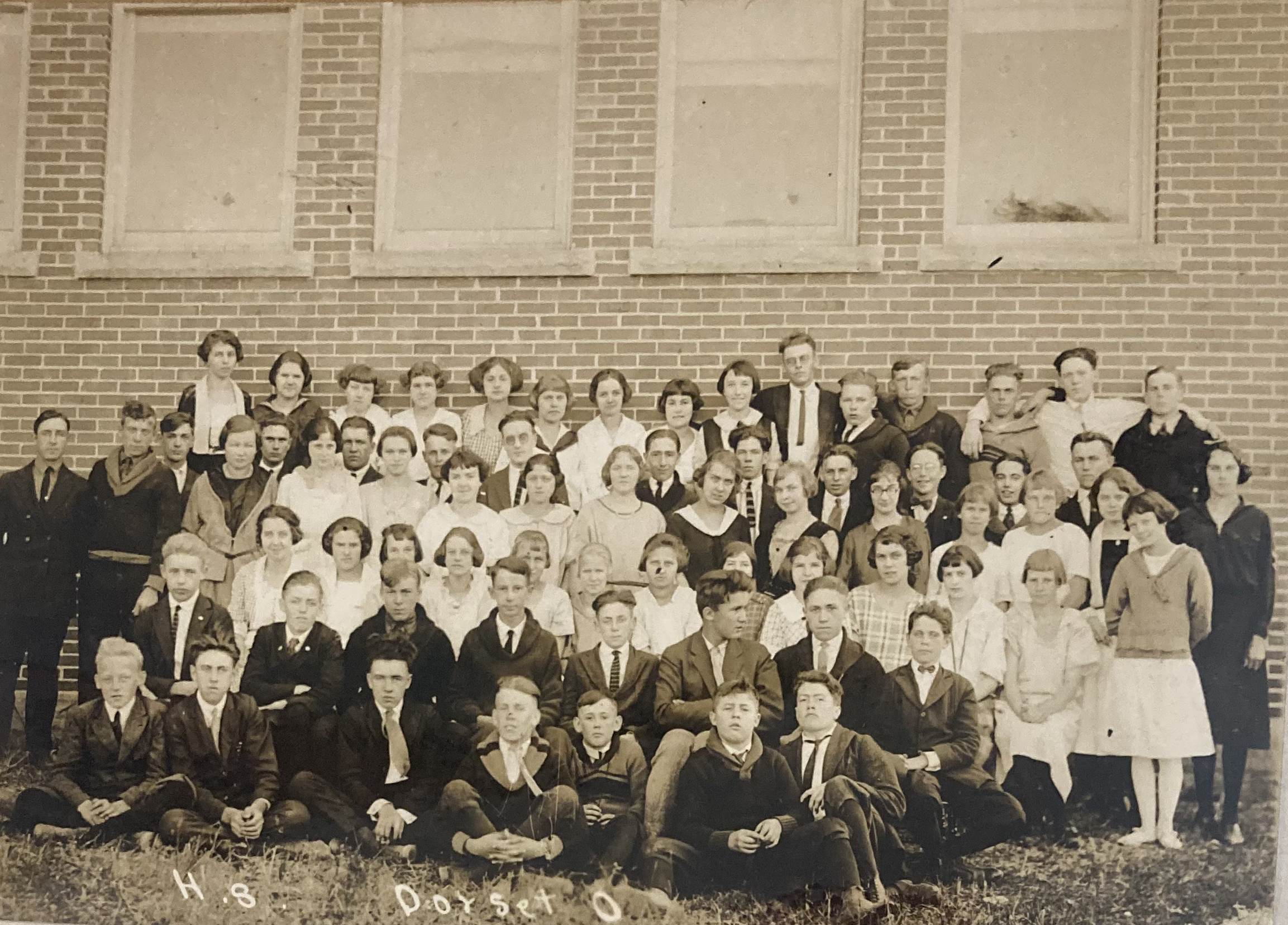
Class photo in front of the school in Dorset.

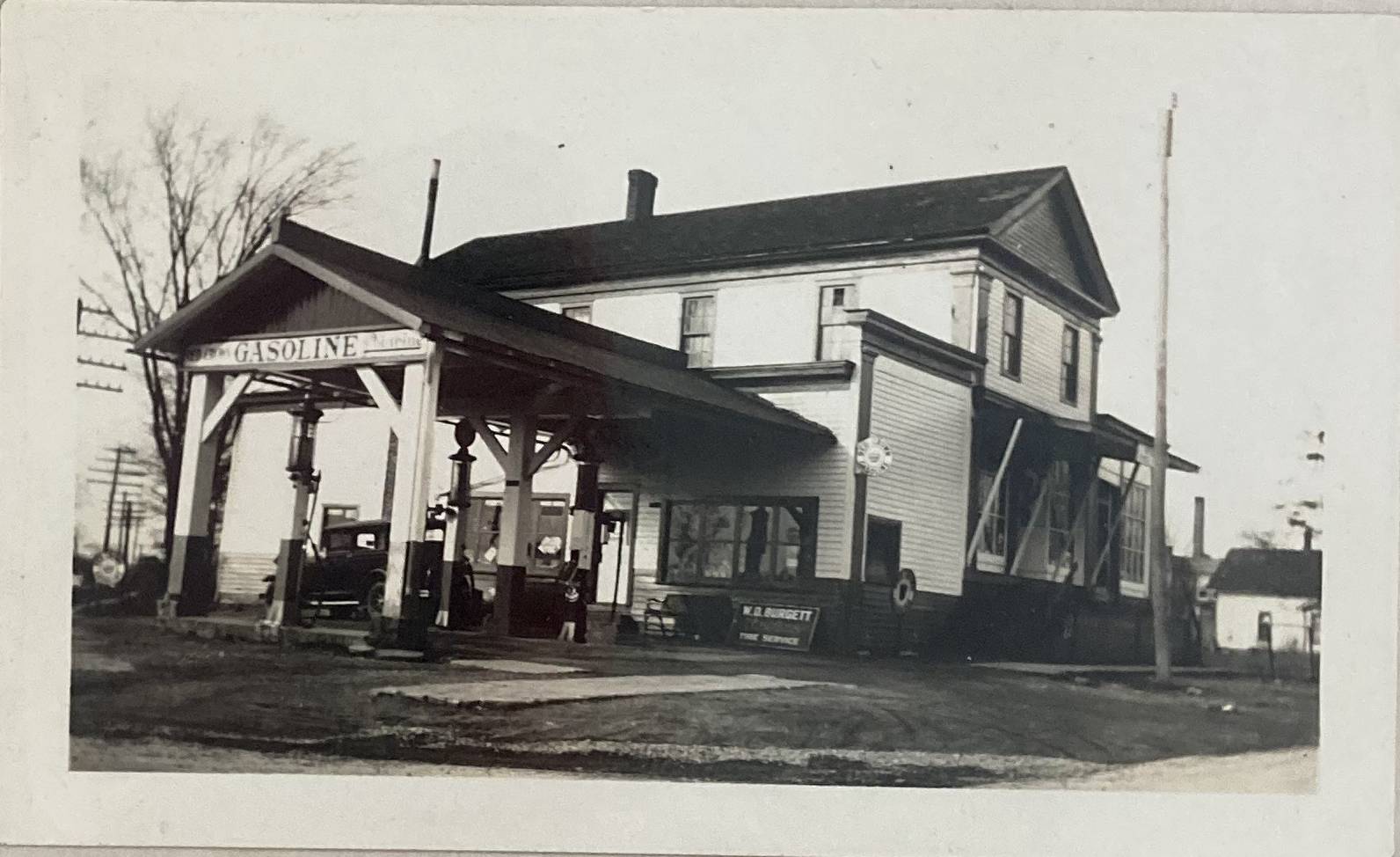
This store appears to be the same as another photo, the only difference being the addition of a gas station.

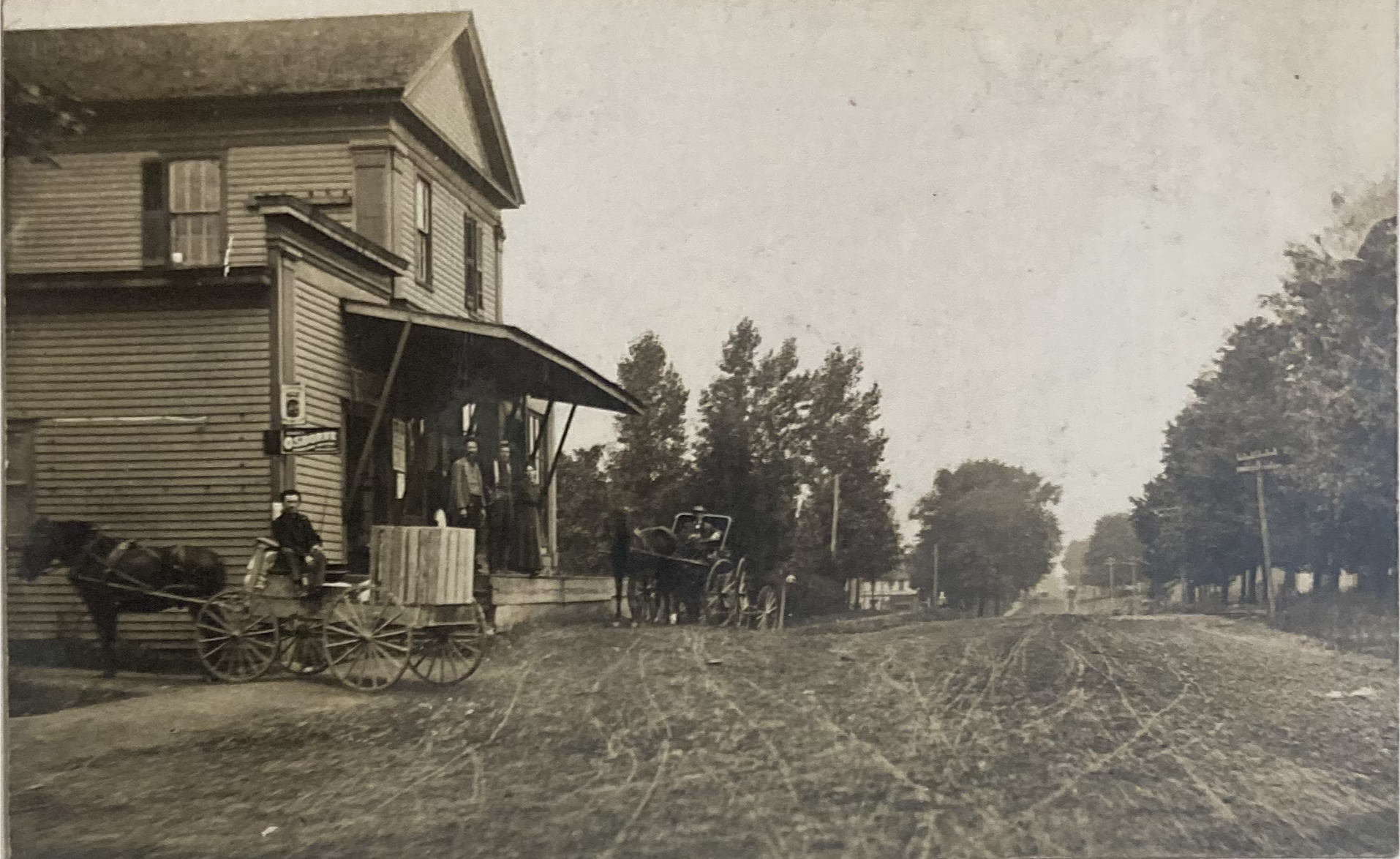
This appears to have been one of the many stores in Dorset; the exact location is unknown.

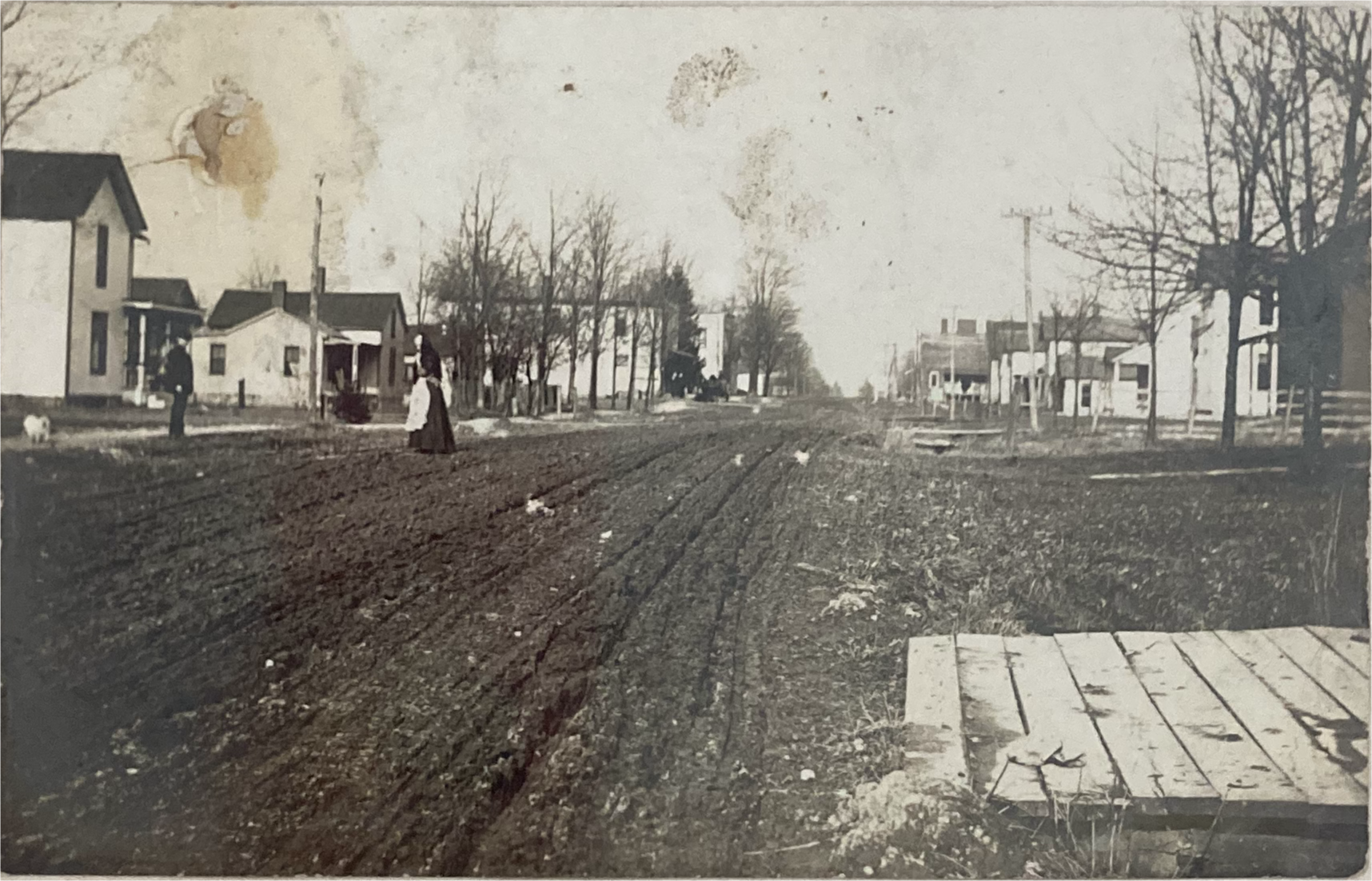
Looking north on State Route 193; the second house on the left appears to be roughly where the Township garage is now located.

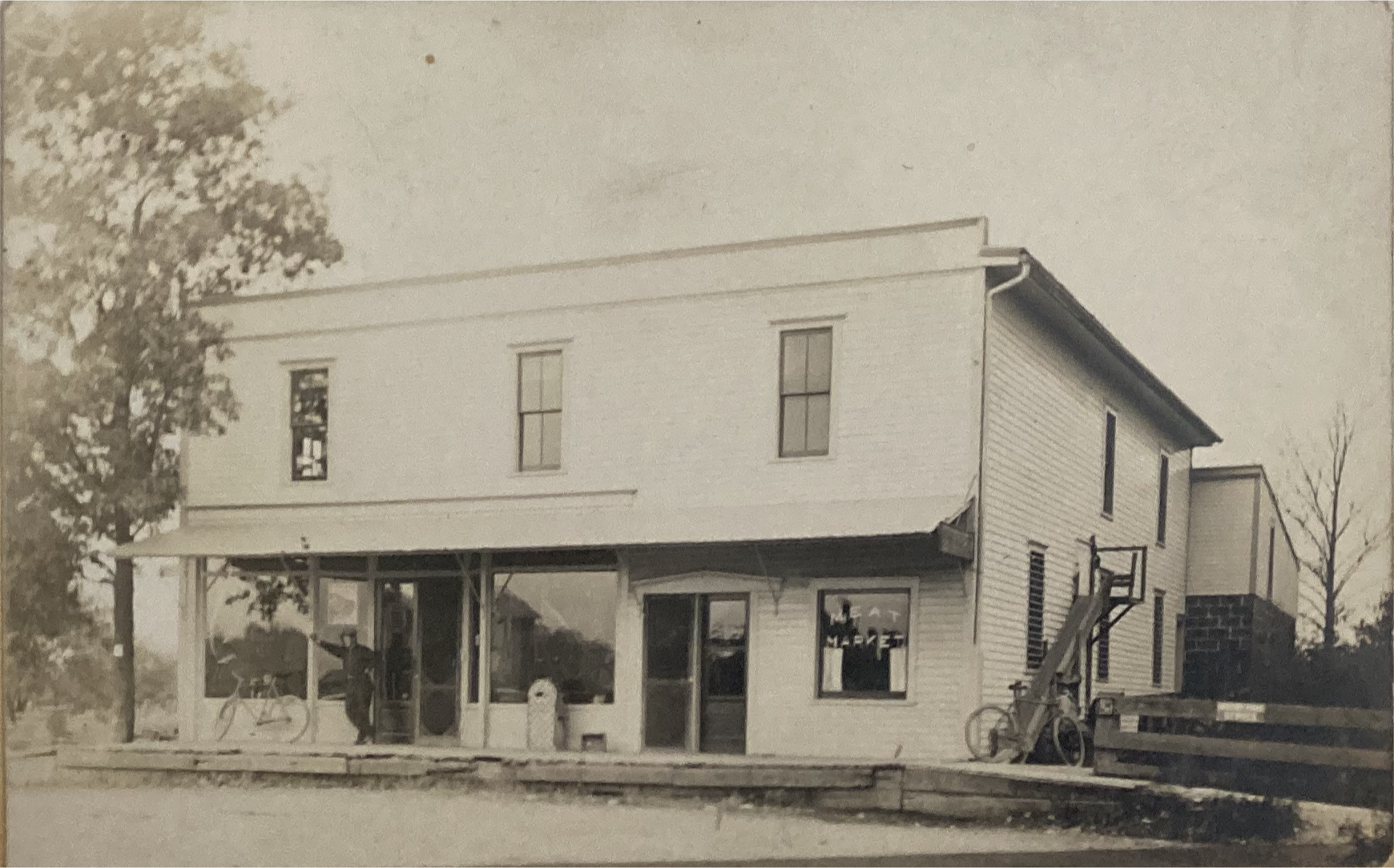
Storefronts in Dorset

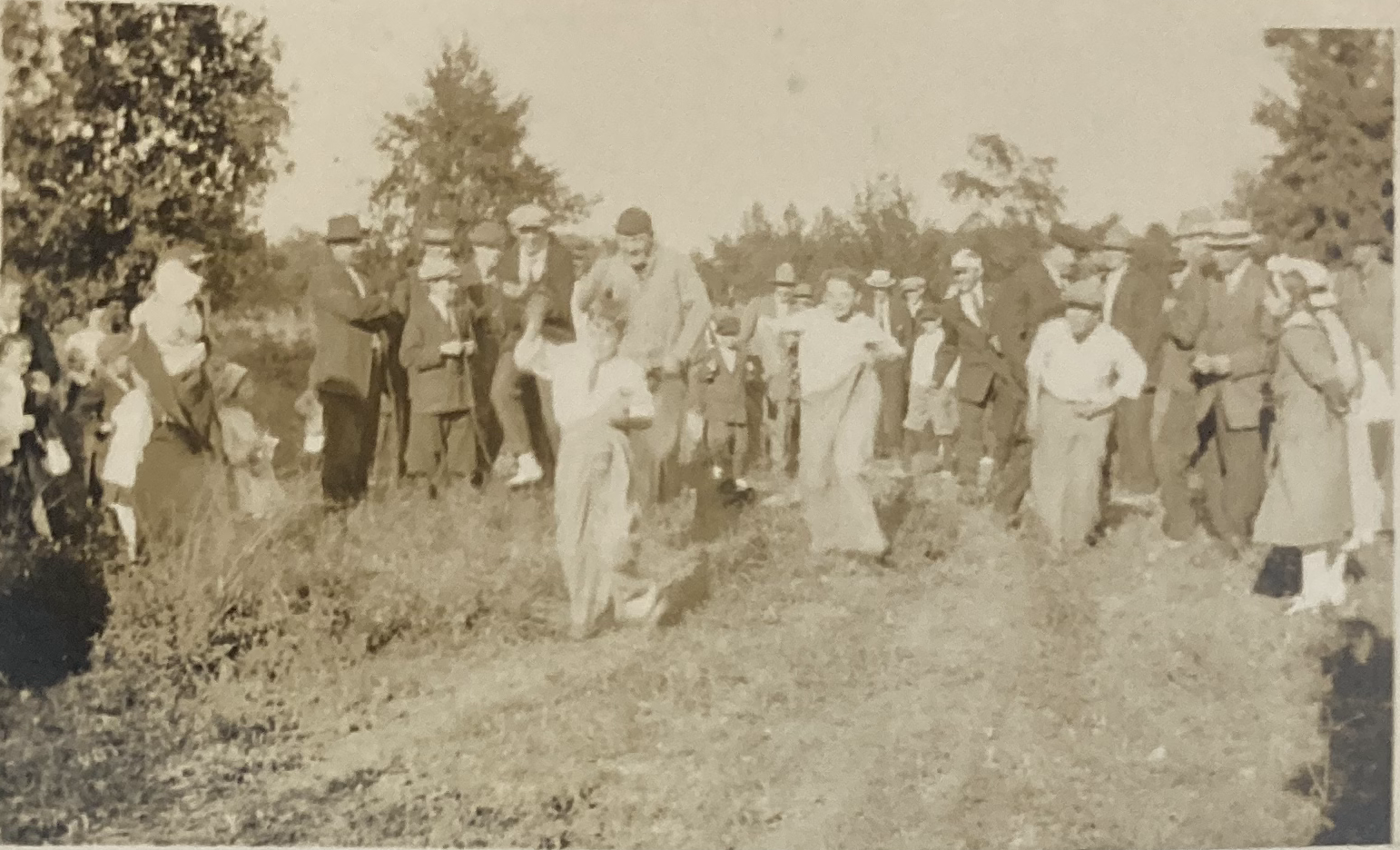
Some sort of unidentified community event in Dorset

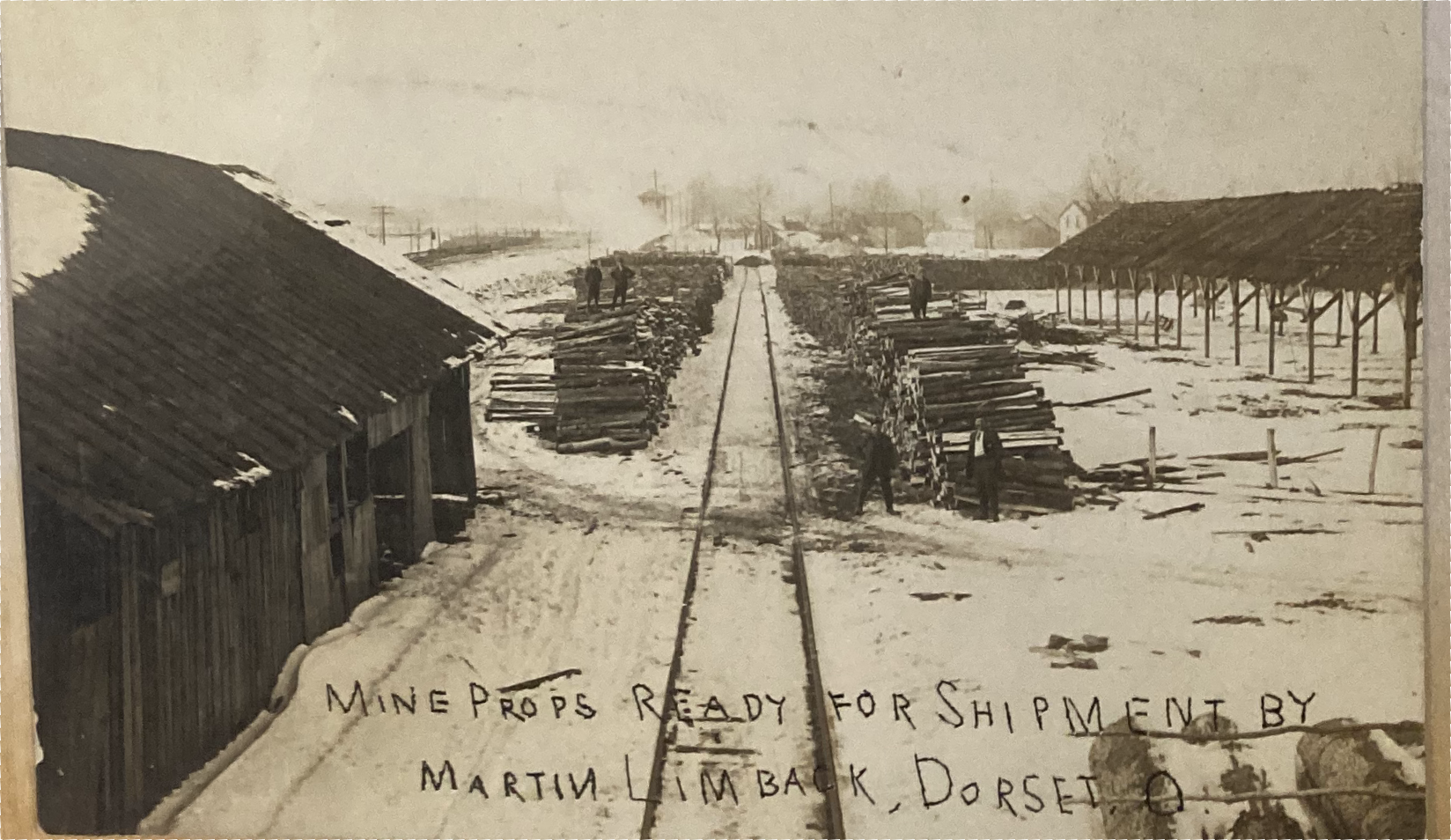
Mine prop shipment Dorset

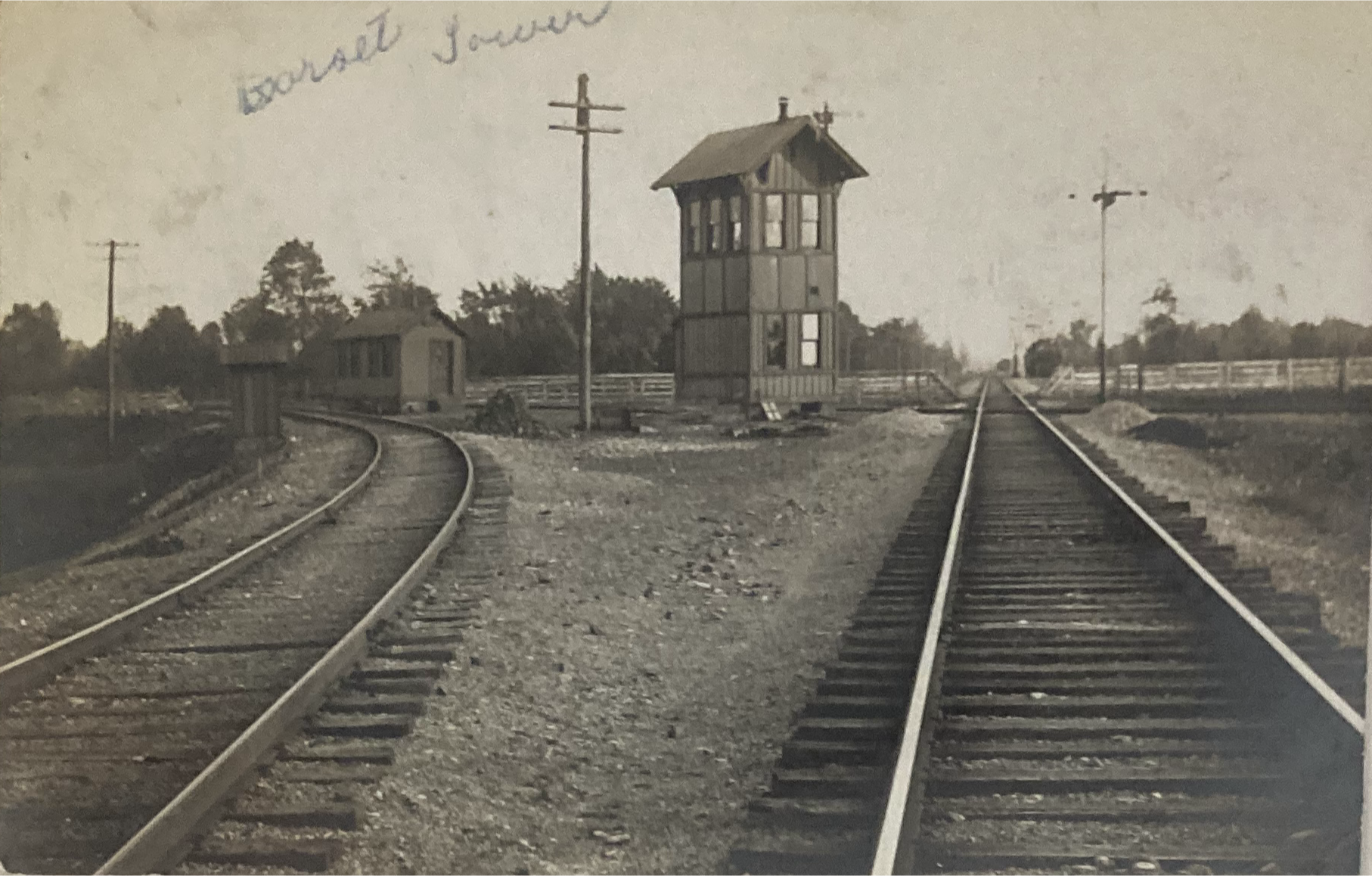
Railroad Tower, possibly located on the west side of Tower Road in Dorset

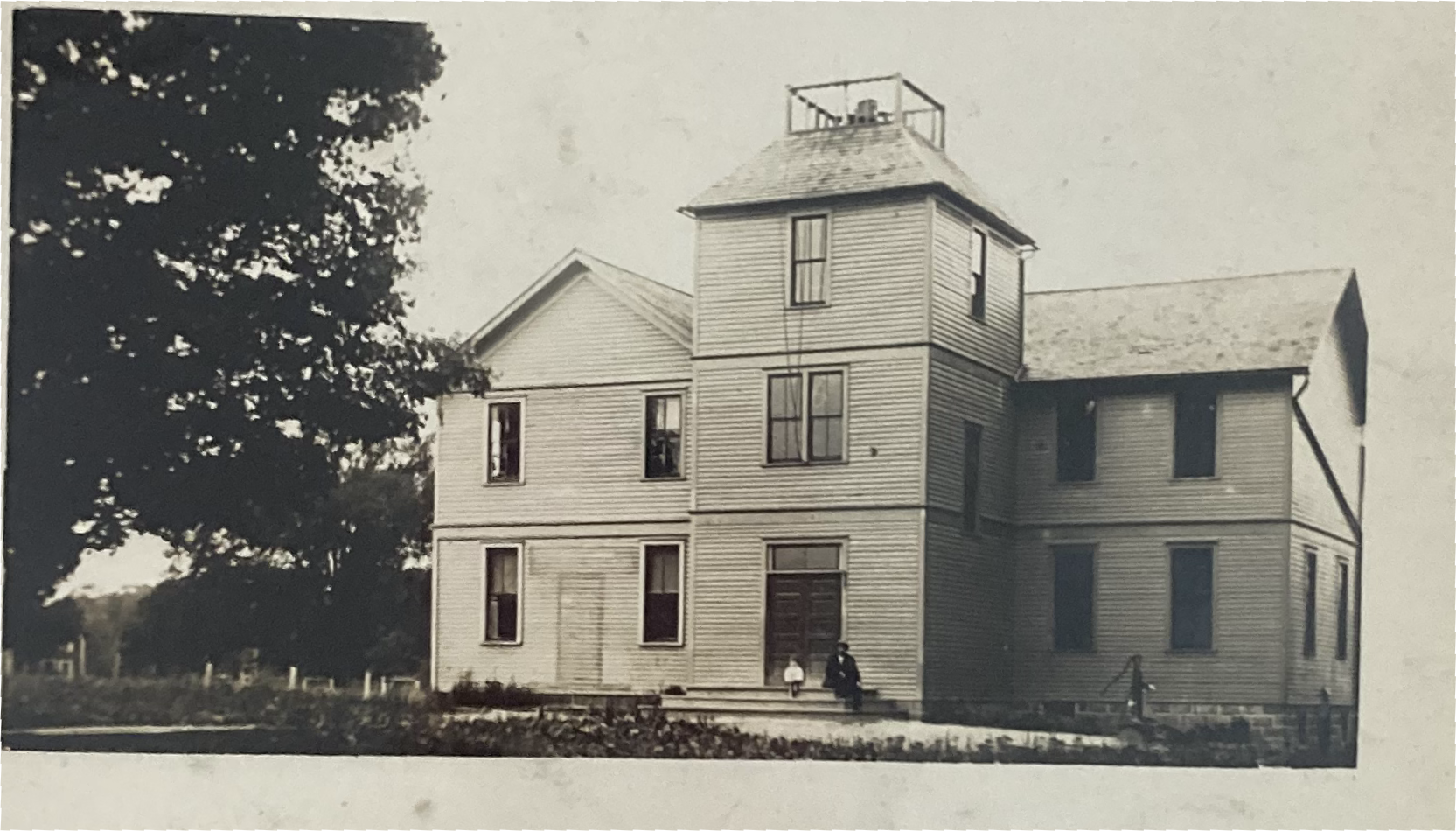
One of the first schools located in Dorset

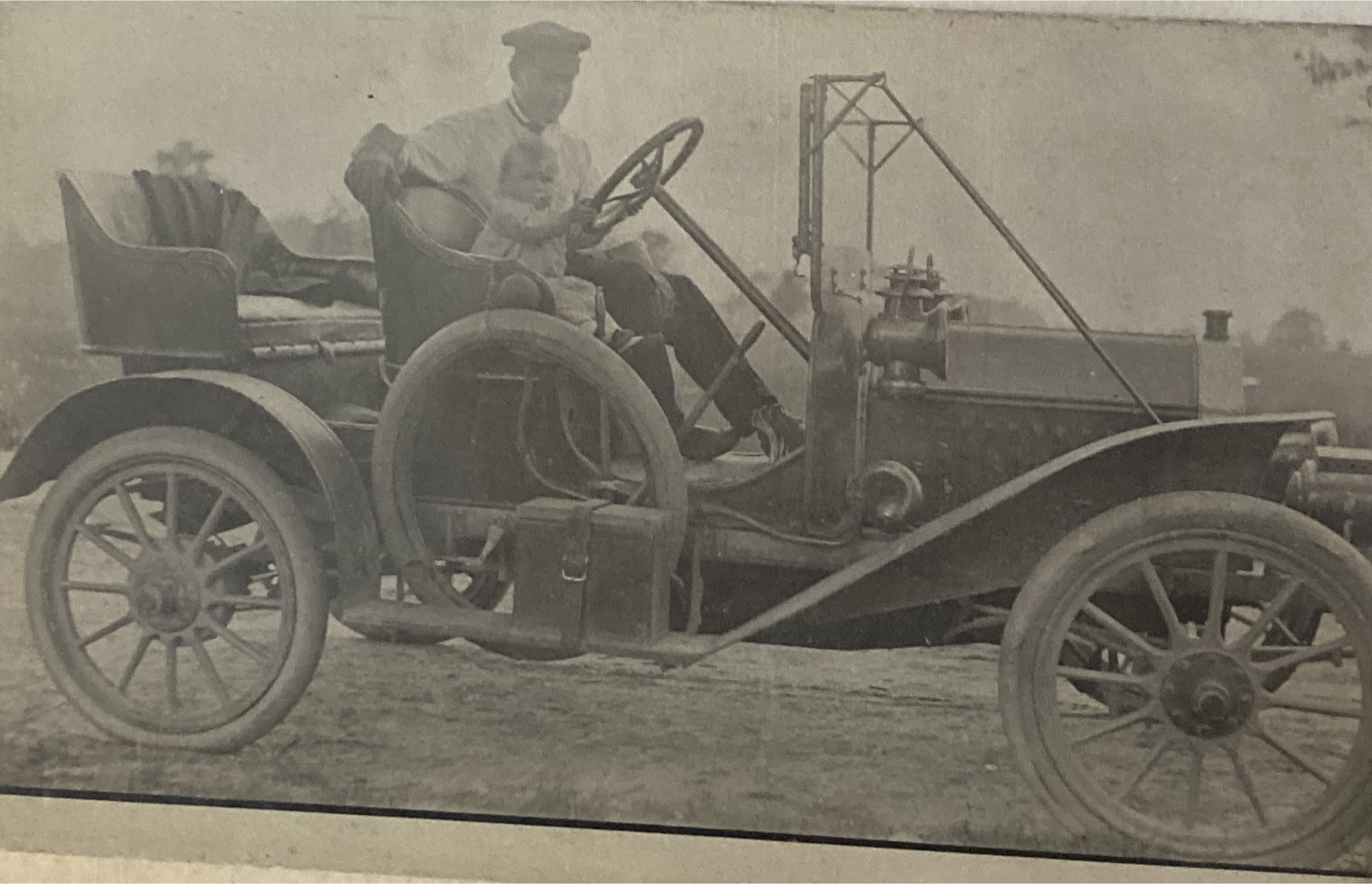
Early car, photo taken in Dorset

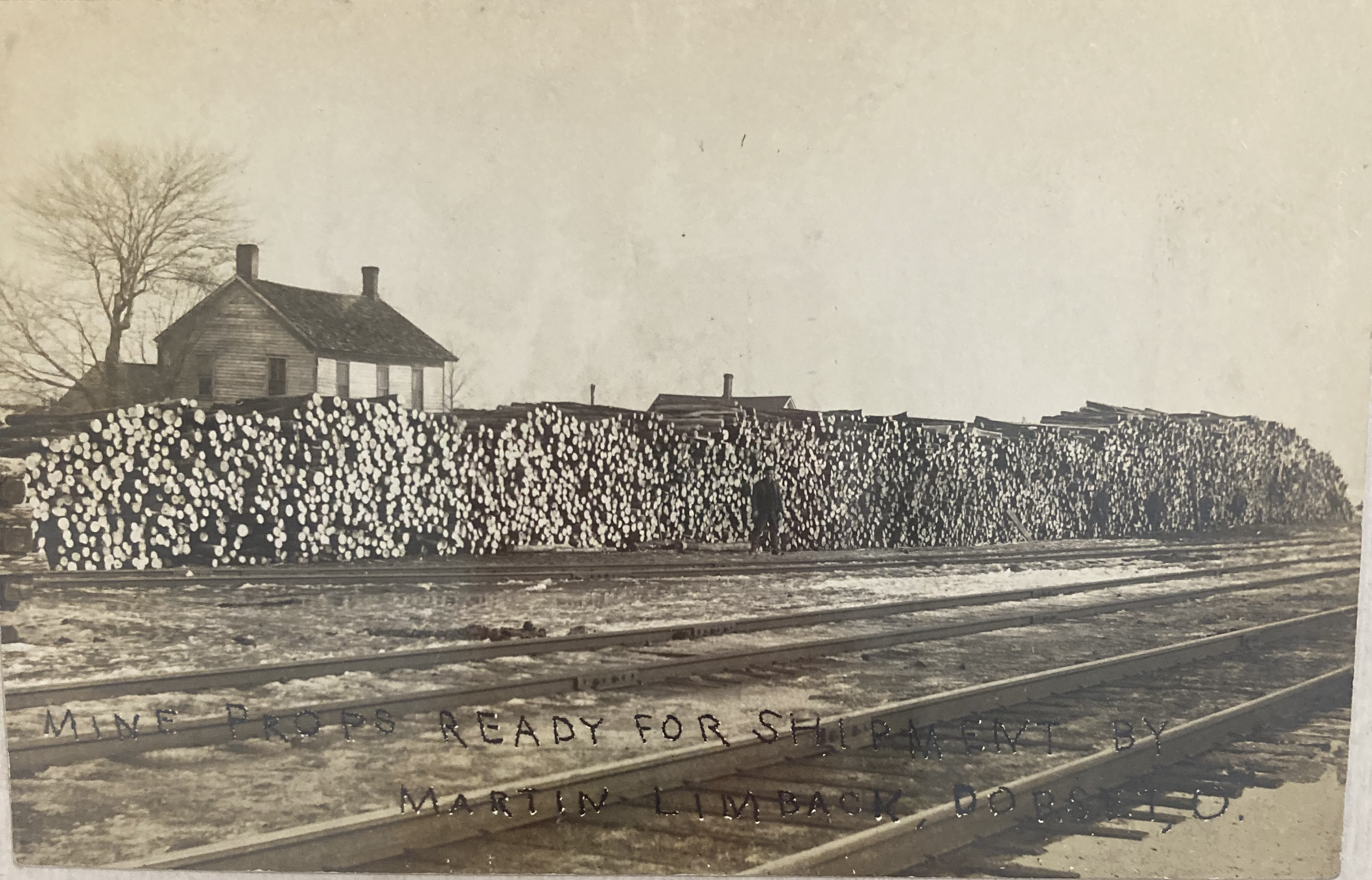
Log shipment in Dorset

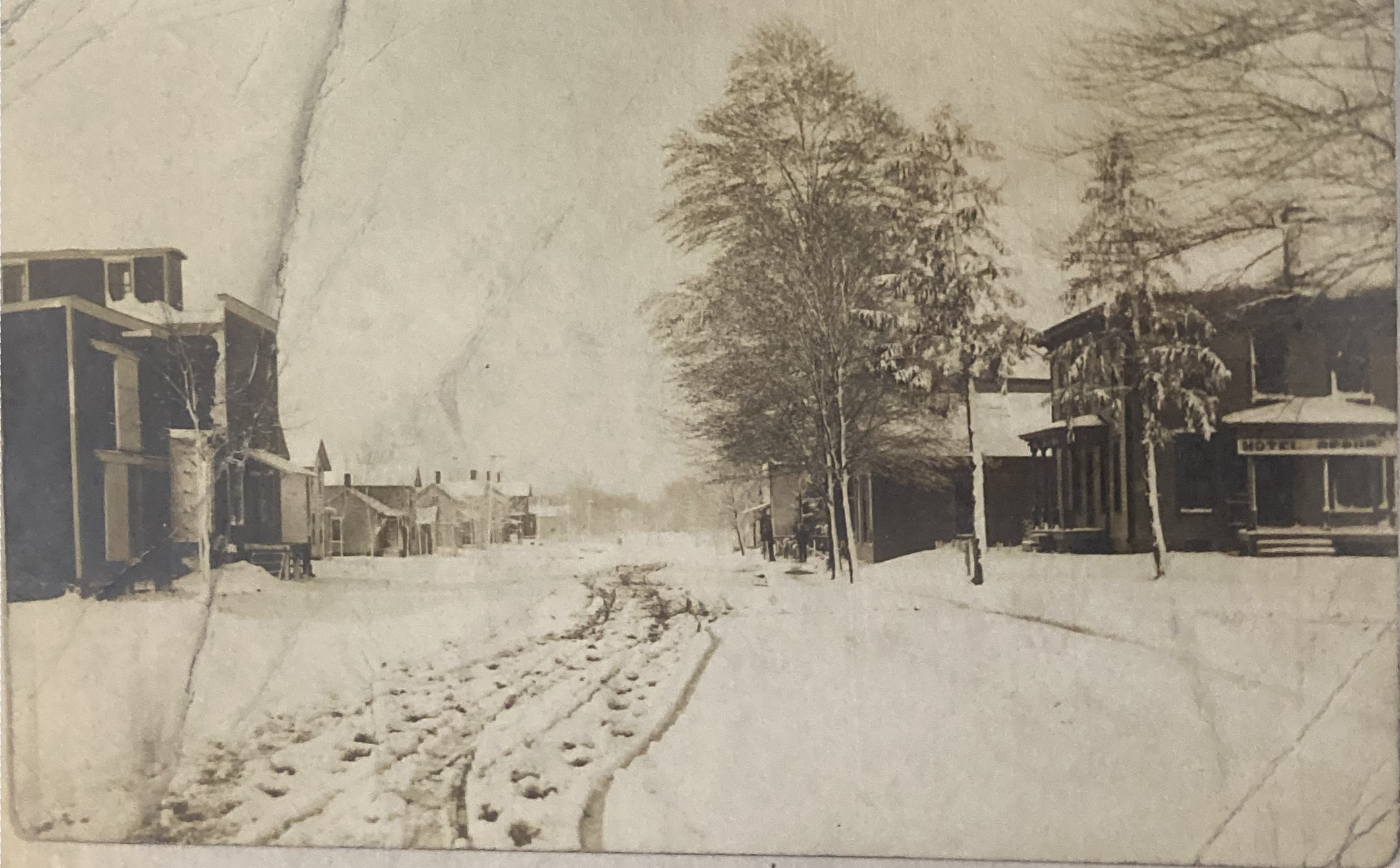
Hotel and Mill located in Dorset

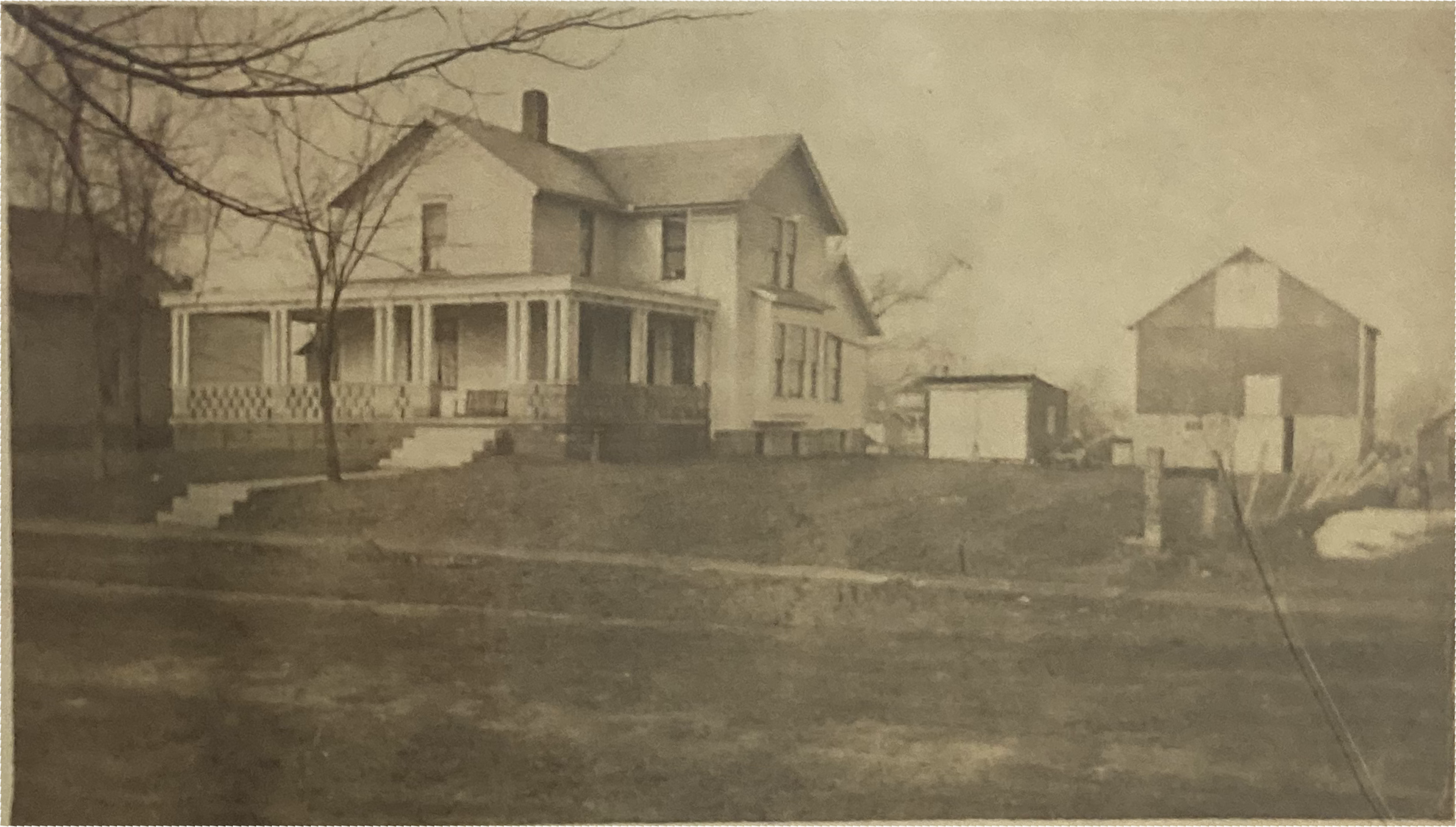
Home and barn in photo located to the left of the Dorset School

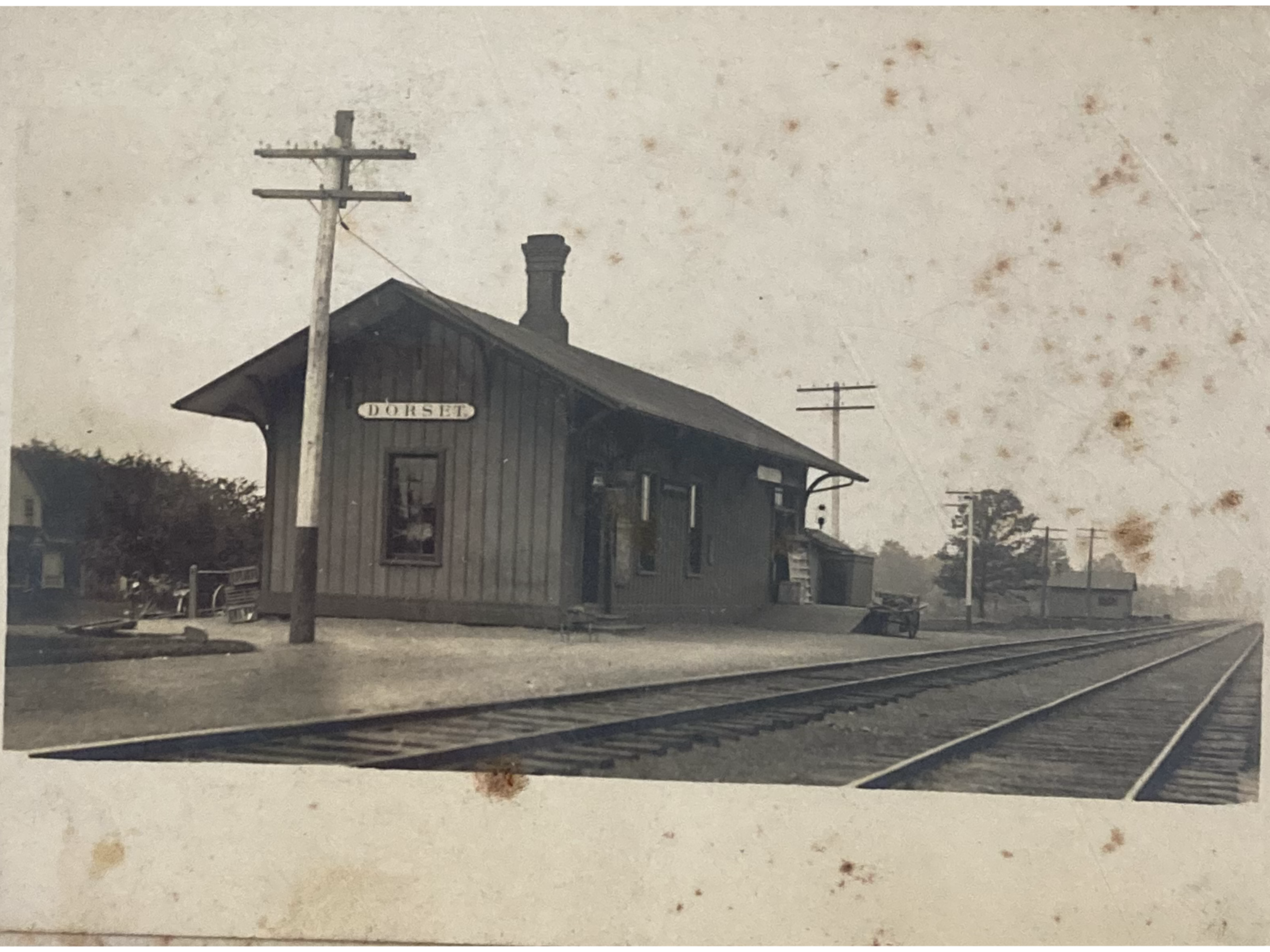
Train station in Dorset

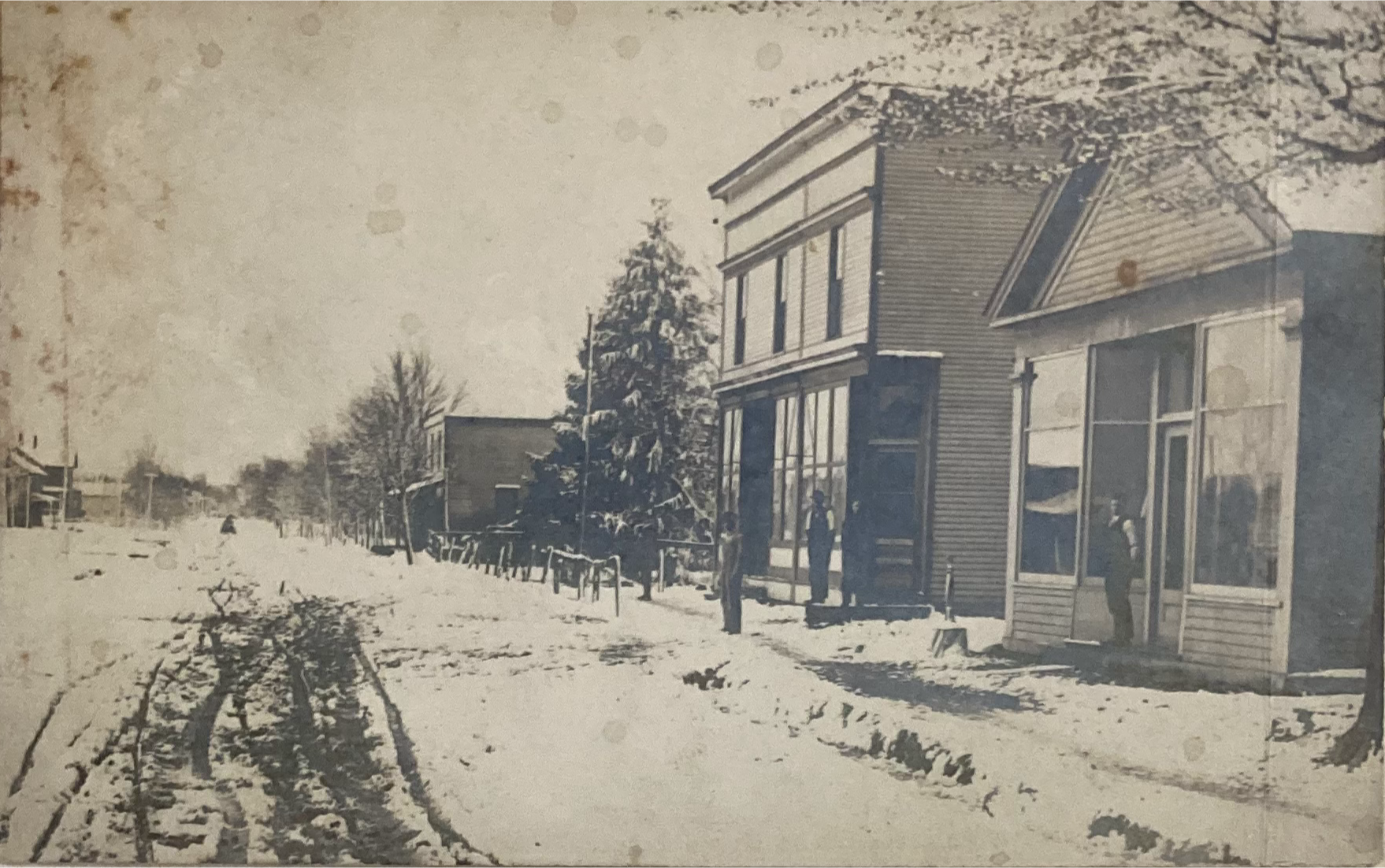
Storefronts located in Dorset

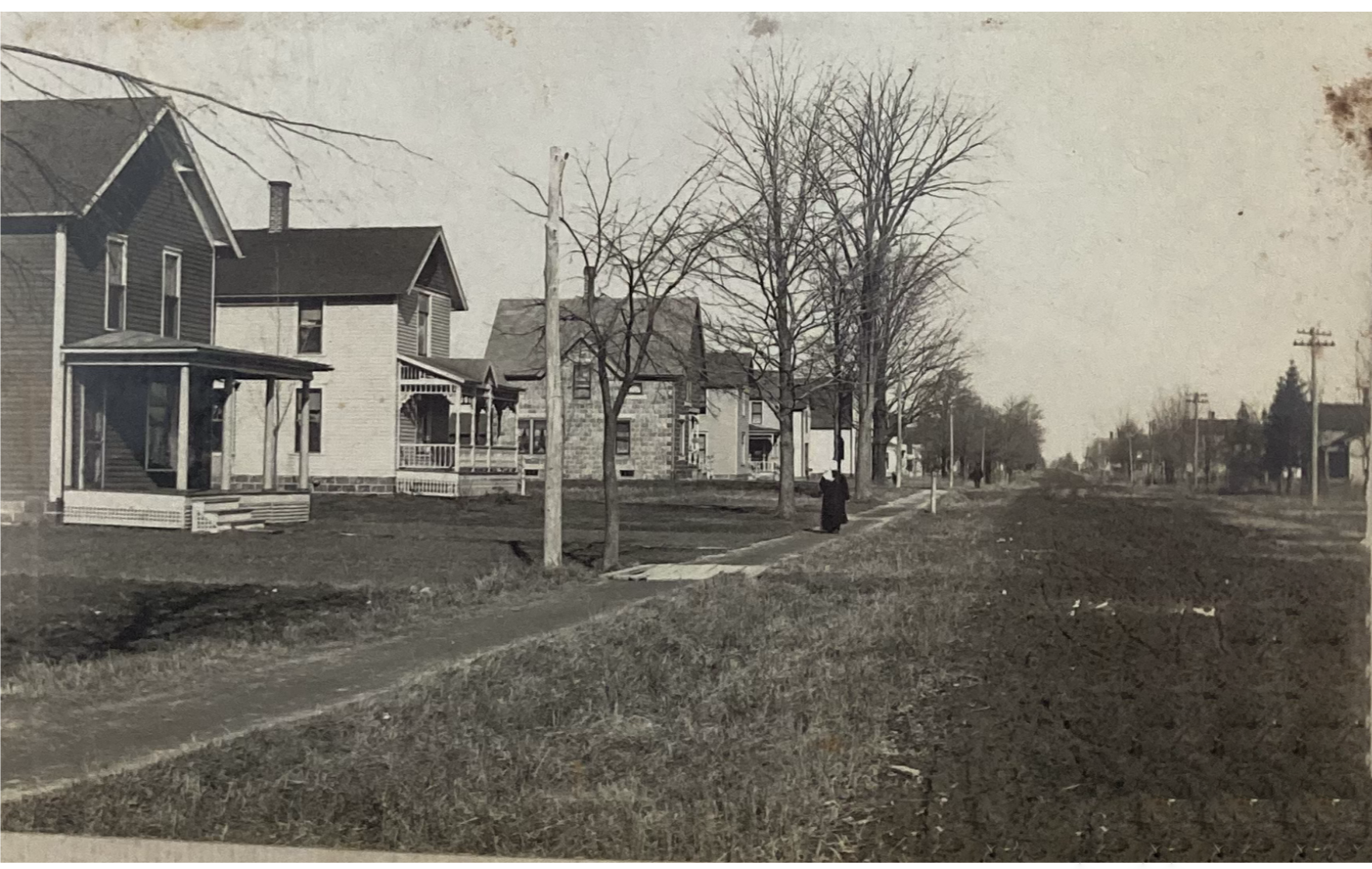
State Route 193 looking North in Dorset, with block home on the left side of the photo that would later become the bakery and game room after.

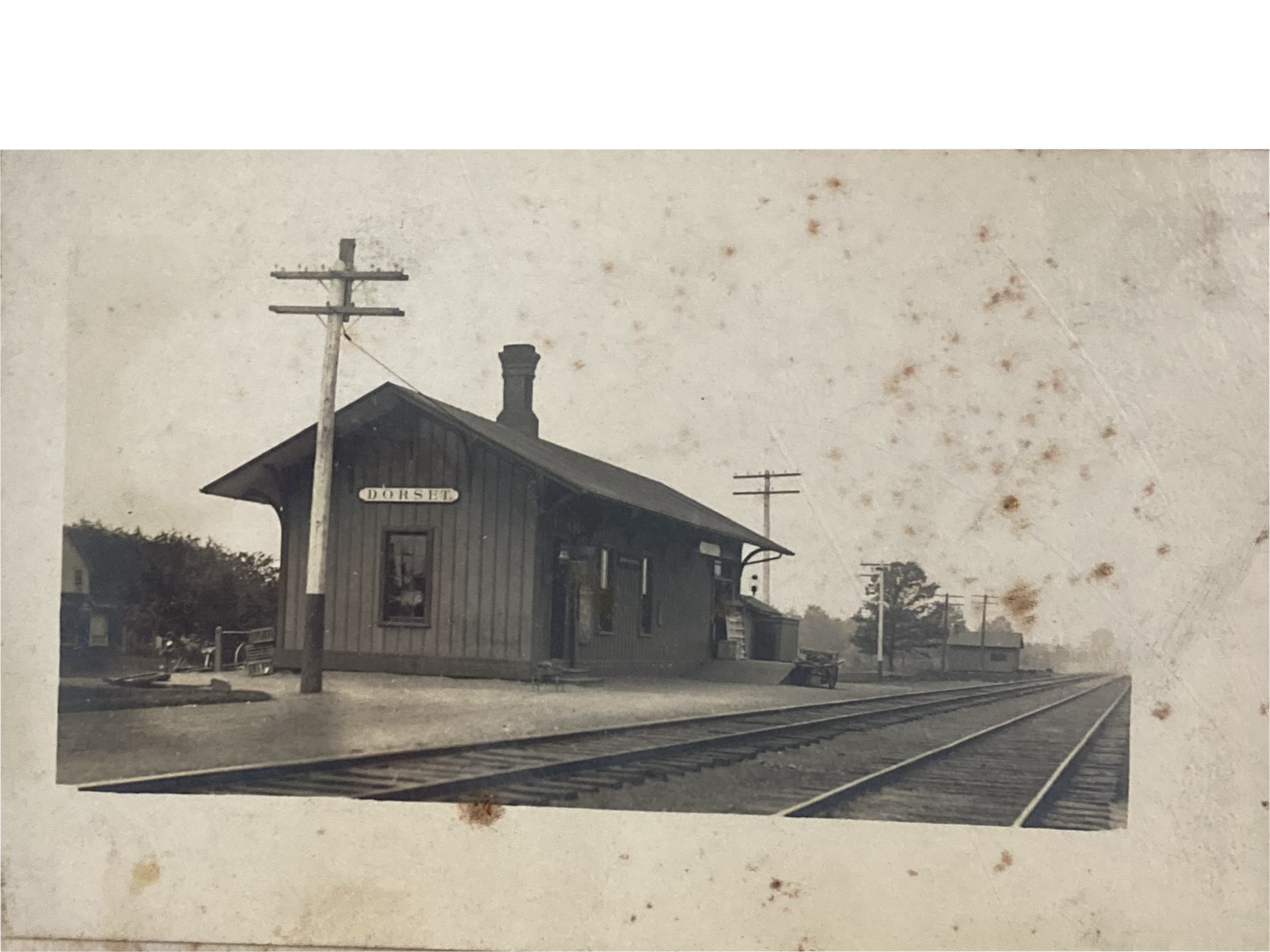
Train Station in Dorset

</details>
