= Kingsville Township, Ashtabula County, Ohio =

Township in Ohio, US

- Township
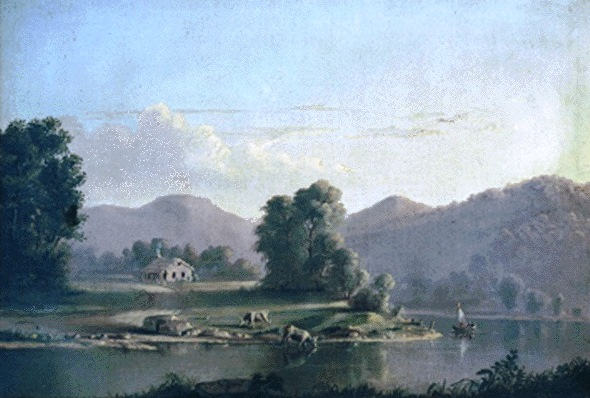
- 1850s painting of Conneaut Creek in the township

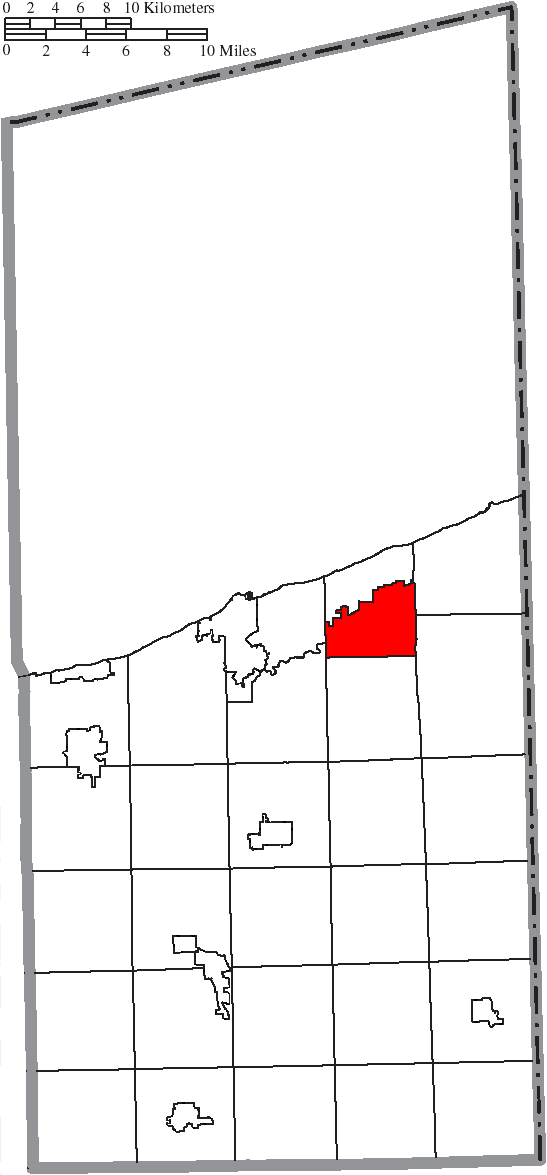
- Location of Kingsville Township in Ashtabula County
- Coordinates: 41°53′24″N 80°40′32″W
- Country: United States
- State: Ohio
- County: Ashtabula

Area
  - Total: 12.9 sq mi (33.4 km^{2})
  - Land: 12.8 sq mi (33.2 km^{2})
  - Water: 0.077 sq mi (0.2 km^{2})
- Elevation: 758 ft (231 m)

Population (2020)
  - Total: 1,649
  - Density: 138/sq mi (53.2/km^{2})
- Time zone: UTC-5 (Eastern (EST))
  - Summer (DST): UTC-4 (EDT)
- ZIP codes: 44048, 44068
- Area code: 440
- FIPS code: 39-40404
- GNIS feature ID: 1085730
- Website: www.kingsvilletwp.org

Kingsville Township is one of the twenty-seven townships of Ashtabula County, Ohio, United States. The 2020 census found 1,649 people in the township.

== Geography ==
Located on the northeastern edge of the county along Lake Erie, it borders the following townships and city:

- Conneaut - northeast
- Monroe Township - southeast
- Sheffield Township - south
- Plymouth Township - southwest
- Ashtabula Township - west

The Canadian province of Ontario lies across Lake Erie to the north.

The northern part of Kingsville Township is occupied by the village of North Kingsville, and the unincorporated community of Kingsville lies in the center of the township.

=== Major highways ===
- I-90
- SR 84
- SR 193

== Name and history ==
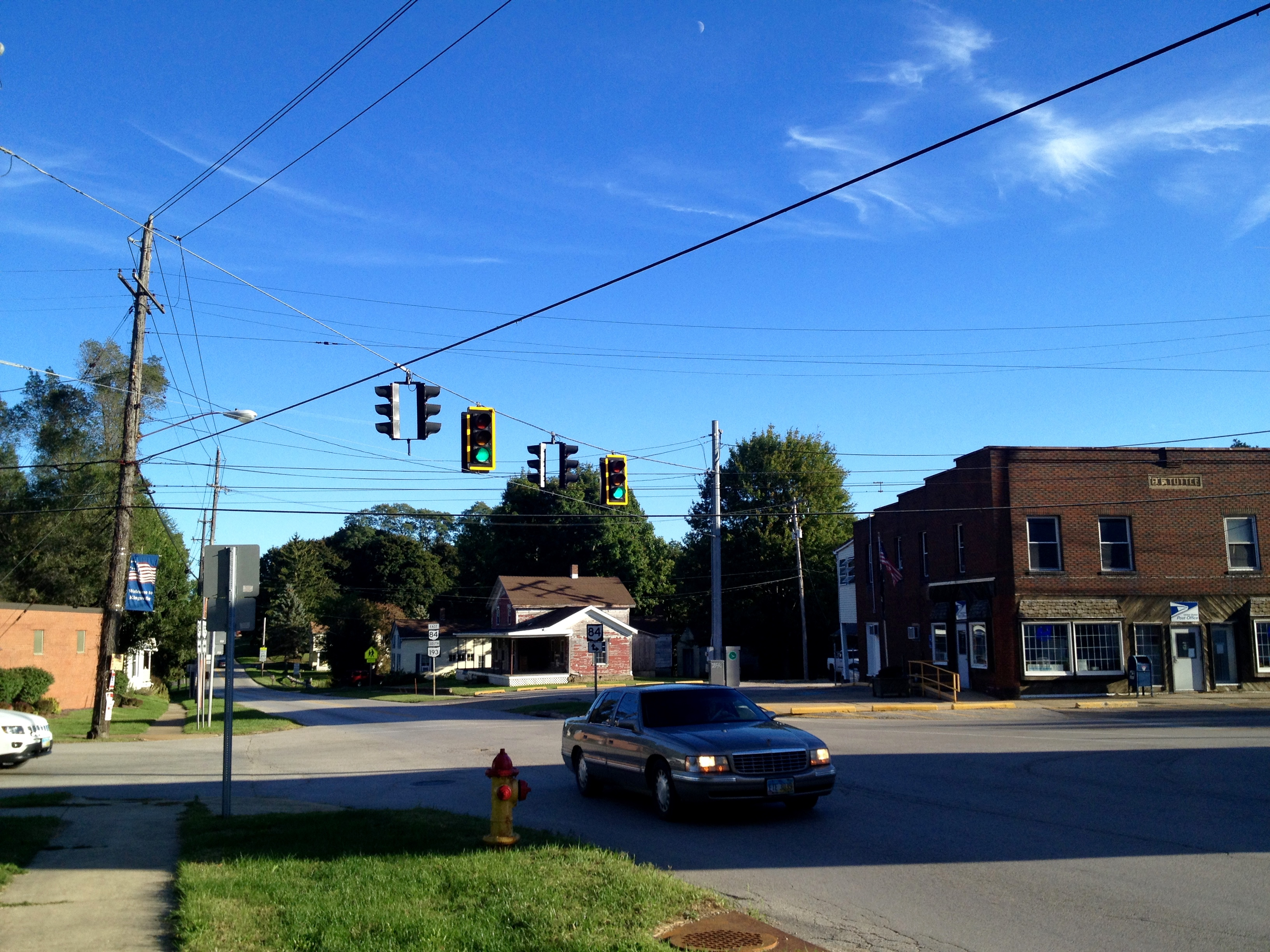
A view Kingsville Ohio in September 2015.

It is the only Kingsville Township statewide. The township was named for a resident of Conneaut named King, who paid early settlers four gallons of whiskey to name the township for him.

The first settler in Kingsville Township was Eldad Harrington, a hunter who arrived in 1803. Two years later, he was followed by former Massachusetts resident Walter Fobes.

In 1833, Kingsville Township contained one store, one gristmill, two saw mills, two fulling mills, two carding machines, and a trip hammer.

== Government ==
The township is governed by a three-member board of trustees, who are elected in November of odd-numbered years to a four-year term beginning on the following January 1. Two are elected in the year after the presidential election and one is elected in the year before it. There is also an elected township clerk, who serves a four-year term beginning on April 1 of the year after the election, which is held in November of the year before the presidential election. Vacancies in the clerkship or on the board of trustees are filled by the remaining trustees. Currently, the board is composed of chairman Doug Reed and members Dennis Huey and Darrell Ensman.
