= Dorset Township, Ohio =

Township in Ohio, US

Dorset Township, Ashtabula County, Ohio
- Township
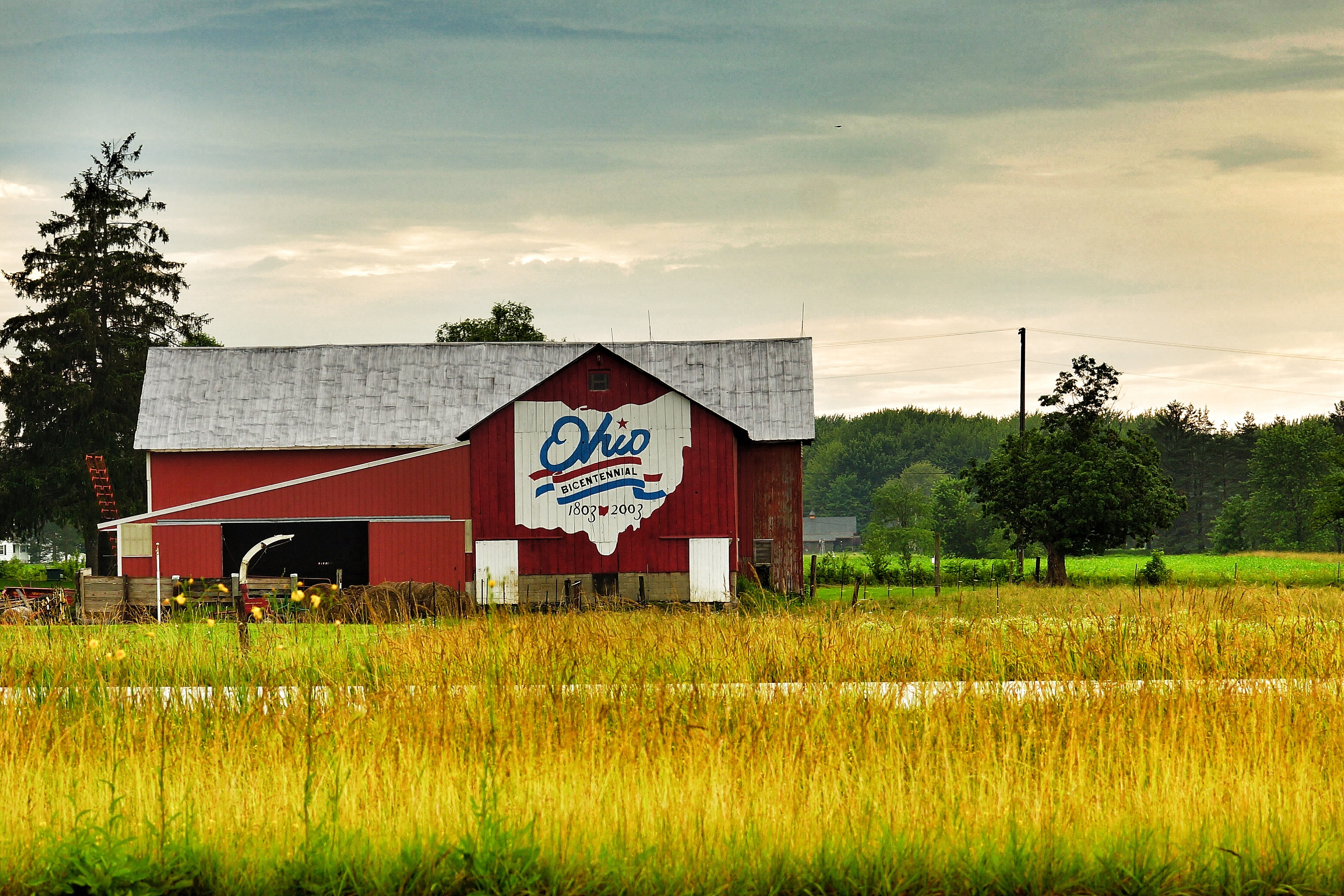
- Ohio Bicentennial Barn

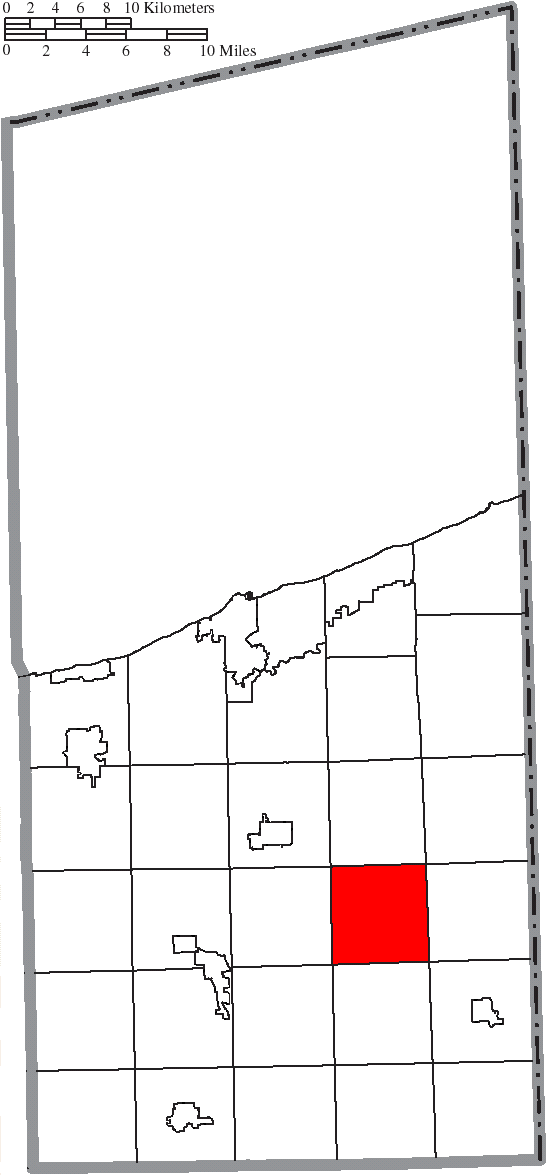
- Location of Dorset Township in Ashtabula County
- Coordinates: 41°40′35″N 80°40′7″W
- Country: United States
- State: Ohio
- County: Ashtabula

Area
  - Total: 23.1 sq mi (59.8 km^{2})
  - Land: 23.1 sq mi (59.7 km^{2})
  - Water: 0.039 sq mi (0.1 km^{2})
- Elevation: 978 ft (298 m)

Population (2020)
  - Total: 807
  - Density: 37/sq mi (14.2/km^{2})
- Time zone: UTC-5 (Eastern (EST))
  - Summer (DST): UTC-4 (EDT)
- ZIP code: 44032
- Area code: 440
- FIPS code: 39-22344
- GNIS feature ID: 1085725

Dorset Township is one of the twenty-seven townships of Ashtabula County, Ohio, United States. The 2020 census found 807 people in the township.

== Geography ==
Located in the eastern part of the county, it borders the following townships:

- Denmark Township - north
- Pierpont Township - northeast corner
- Richmond Township - east
- Andover Township - southeast corner
- Cherry Valley Township - south
- New Lyme Township - southwest corner
- Lenox Township - west
- Jefferson Township - northwest corner

No municipalities are located in Dorset Township, although the unincorporated community of Dorset lies in the center of the township.

=== Climate ===
Climate data for Dorset, Ohio, 1991–2020 normals, extremes 1956–2018
Month	Jan	Feb	Mar	Apr	May	Jun	Jul	Aug	Sep	Oct	Nov	Dec	Year
Record high °F (°C)	68 (20)	74 (23)	83 (28)	88 (31)	90 (32)	99 (37)	100 (38)	98 (37)	95 (35)	86 (30)	83 (28)	74 (23)	100 (38)
Mean maximum °F (°C)	54.9 (12.7)	57.3 (14.1)	71.5 (21.9)	80.3 (26.8)	83.7 (28.7)	89.4 (31.9)	91.2 (32.9)	89.6 (32.0)	86.3 (30.2)	78.4 (25.8)	69.5 (20.8)	57.3 (14.1)	92.1 (33.4)
Mean daily maximum °F (°C)	32.2 (0.1)	34.8 (1.6)	43.8 (6.6)	57.2 (14.0)	68.4 (20.2)	76.6 (24.8)	80.6 (27.0)	79.2 (26.2)	73.1 (22.8)	61.2 (16.2)	48.3 (9.1)	37.4 (3.0)	57.7 (14.3)
Daily mean °F (°C)	24.4 (−4.2)	25.7 (−3.5)	34.3 (1.3)	46.2 (7.9)	57.1 (13.9)	65.6 (18.7)	69.6 (20.9)	68.1 (20.1)	61.8 (16.6)	50.7 (10.4)	40.1 (4.5)	30.5 (−0.8)	47.8 (8.8)
Mean daily minimum °F (°C)	16.5 (−8.6)	16.7 (−8.5)	24.8 (−4.0)	35.2 (1.8)	45.7 (7.6)	54.7 (12.6)	58.6 (14.8)	57.0 (13.9)	50.4 (10.2)	40.3 (4.6)	31.9 (−0.1)	23.7 (−4.6)	38.0 (3.3)
Mean minimum °F (°C)	−8.9 (−22.7)	−6.6 (−21.4)	1.4 (−17.0)	19.7 (−6.8)	28.6 (−1.9)	37.3 (2.9)	44.3 (6.8)	42.7 (5.9)	35.2 (1.8)	26.4 (−3.1)	16.7 (−8.5)	1.2 (−17.1)	−13.7 (−25.4)
Record low °F (°C)	−28 (−33)	−33 (−36)	−20 (−29)	4 (−16)	21 (−6)	30 (−1)	37 (3)	30 (−1)	26 (−3)	15 (−9)	2 (−17)	−22 (−30)	−33 (−36)
Average precipitation inches (mm)	3.32 (84)	2.55 (65)	3.02 (77)	3.88 (99)	4.00 (102)	4.98 (126)	4.94 (125)	4.19 (106)	4.52 (115)	4.35 (110)	3.51 (89)	3.67 (93)	46.93 (1,191)
Average snowfall inches (cm)	29.6 (75)	15.8 (40)	12.5 (32)	2.4 (6.1)	0.0 (0.0)	0.0 (0.0)	0.0 (0.0)	0.0 (0.0)	0.0 (0.0)	0.4 (1.0)	8.4 (21)	20.8 (53)	89.9 (228.1)
Average extreme snow depth inches (cm)	11.3 (29)	7.9 (20)	7.2 (18)	2.6 (6.6)	0.0 (0.0)	0.0 (0.0)	0.0 (0.0)	0.0 (0.0)	0.0 (0.0)	0.3 (0.76)	4.5 (11)	9.1 (23)	14.6 (37)
Average precipitation days (≥ 0.01 in)	14.1	10.2	11.2	12.4	11.1	11.2	10.6	9.3	9.6	12.8	12.4	13.1	138.0
Average snowy days (≥ 0.1 in)	10.7	7.4	4.9	1.0	0.0	0.0	0.0	0.0	0.0	0.2	2.7	7.7	34.6
Source 1: NOAA
Source 2: XMACIS2 (mean maxima/minima, snow depth 1981–2010)

== Name and history ==
It is the only Dorset Township statewide.

== Government ==
The township is governed by a three-member board of trustees, who are elected in November of odd-numbered years to a four-year term beginning on the following January 1. Two are elected in the year after the presidential election and one is elected in the year before it. There is also an elected township fiscal officer, who serves a four-year term beginning on April 1 of the year after the election, which is held in November of the year before the presidential election. Vacancies in the fiscal officership or on the board of trustees are filled by the remaining trustees. Currently, the board is composed of chairman Herbert Dean and members James Bailey and Jeffrey Hinkle.
