= Denmark Township, Ohio =

Township in Ohio, US

- Township
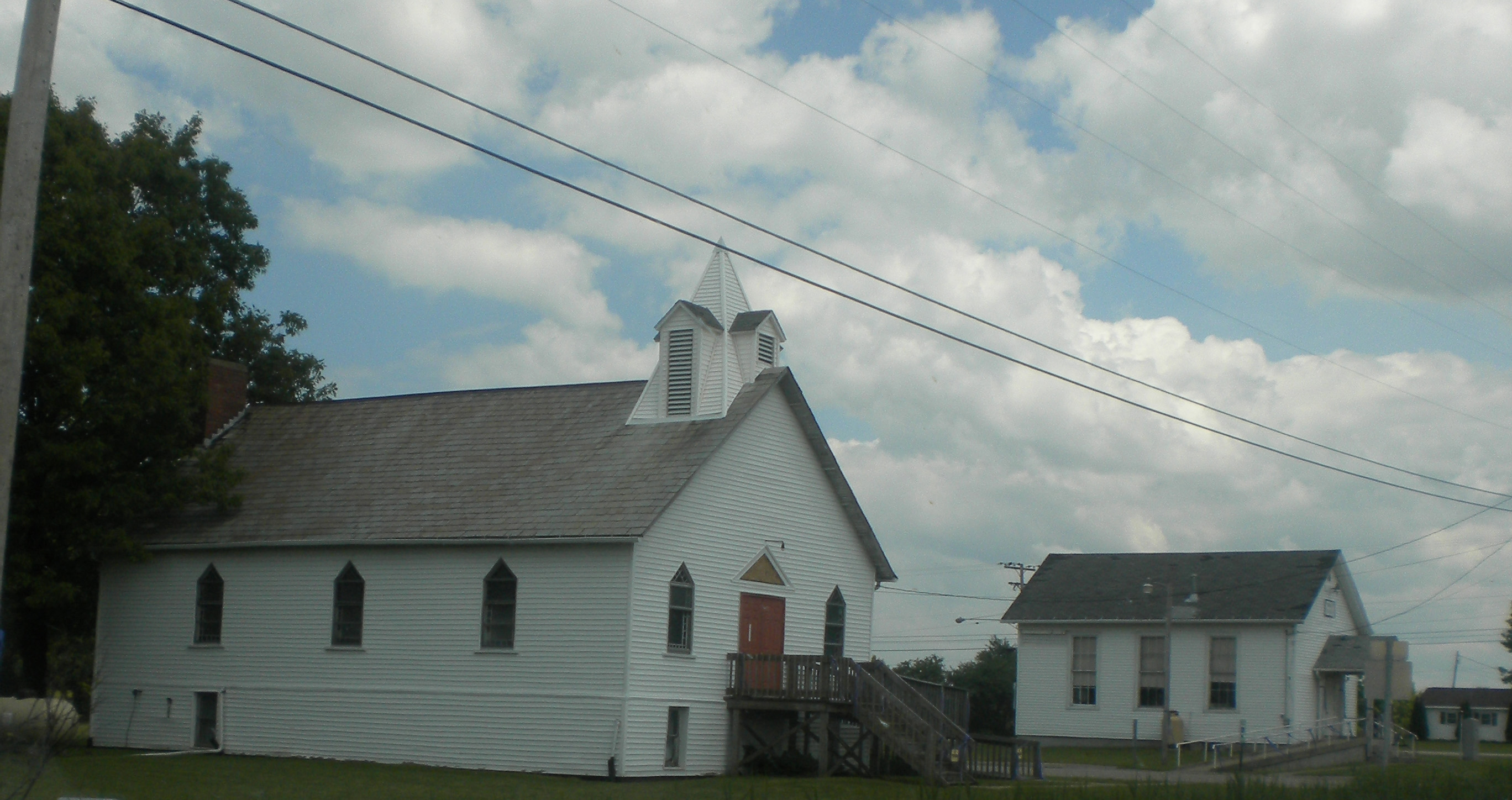
- Church and town hall at Denmark Center
- Interactive map of Denmark Township, Ohio
- Location within Ohio Location within the United States
- Coordinates: 41°44′38″N 80°40′34″W
- Country: United States
- State: Ohio
- County: Ashtabula

Area
  - Total: 24.4 sq mi (63.1 km^{2})
  - Land: 24.4 sq mi (63.1 km^{2})
  - Water: 0 sq mi (0.0 km^{2})
- Elevation: 955 ft (291 m)

Population (2020)
  - Total: 847
  - Density: 39/sq mi (15/km^{2})
- Time zone: UTC-5 (Eastern (EST))
  - Summer (DST): UTC-4 (EDT)
- FIPS code: 39-21672
- GNIS feature ID: 1085724

Denmark Township is one of the twenty-seven townships of Ashtabula County, Ohio, United States. The 2020 census found 847 people in the township.

== Geography ==
Located in the eastern part of the county, it borders the following townships:

- Sheffield Township - north
- Monroe Township - northeast corner
- Pierpont Township - east
- Richmond Township - southeast corner
- Dorset Township - south
- Lenox Township - southwest corner
- Jefferson Township - west
- Plymouth Township - northwest corner

No municipalities are located in Denmark Township.

== Name and history ==
It is the only Denmark Township statewide.

The area now composing Denmark Township was long inhabited by the Seneca Indian tribe. Peter Knapp, a New Yorker who arrived in 1809, was the first Euro-American settler in the area.

Denmark Township was described in 1833 as having one gristmill and two saw mills.

== Government ==
The township is governed by a three-member board of trustees, who are elected in November of odd-numbered years to a four-year term beginning on the following January 1. Two are elected in the year after the presidential election and one is elected in the year before it. There is also an elected township fiscal officer, who serves a four-year term beginning on April 1 of the year after the election, which is held in November of the year before the presidential election. Vacancies in the fiscal officership or on the board of trustees are filled by the remaining trustees. Currently, the board is composed of chairman Charles Frye and members Chad Corron and Fred Williams.
