= Monroe Township, Ashtabula County, Ohio =

Township in Ohio, US

- Township
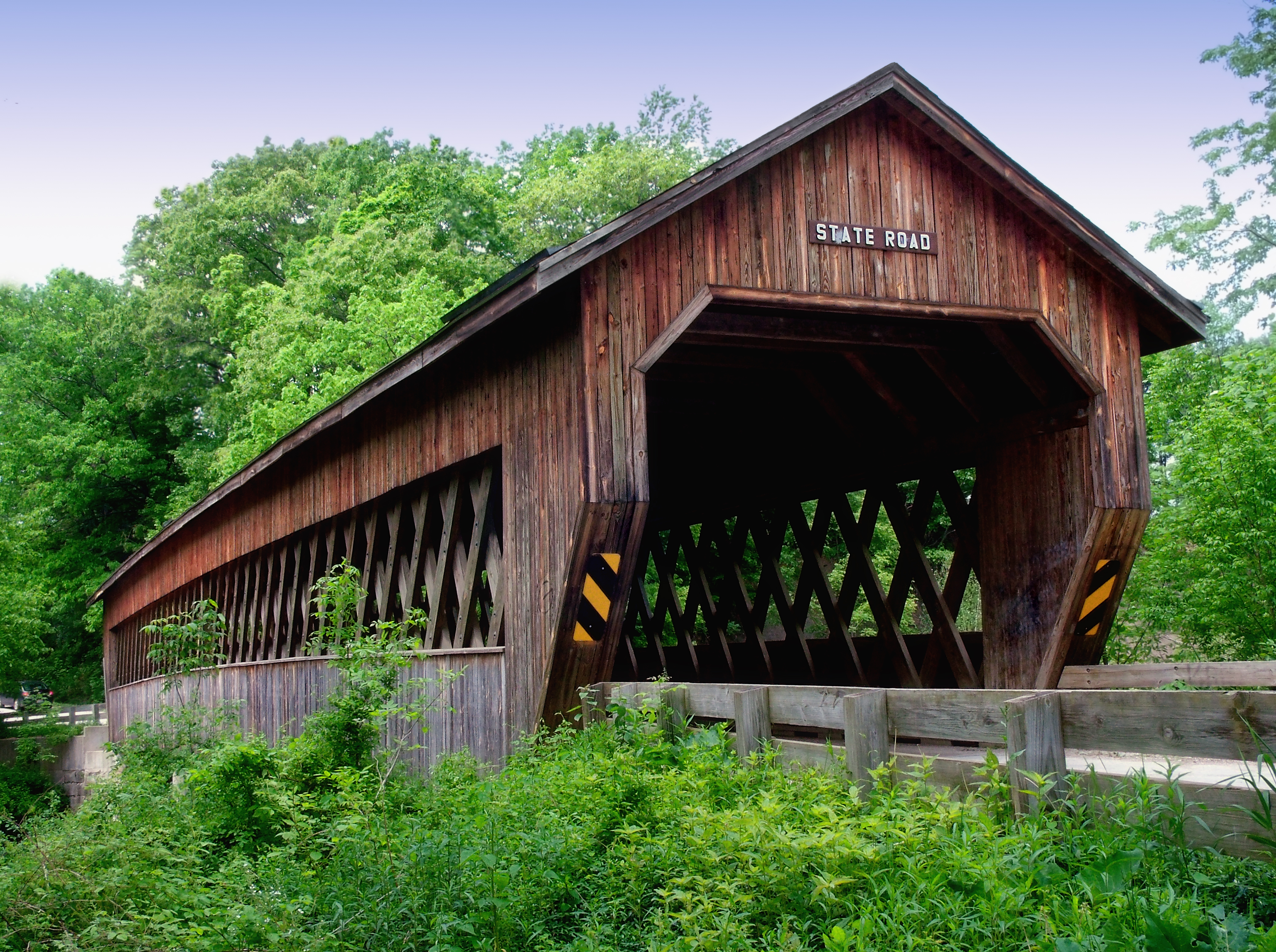
- State Road Covered Bridge

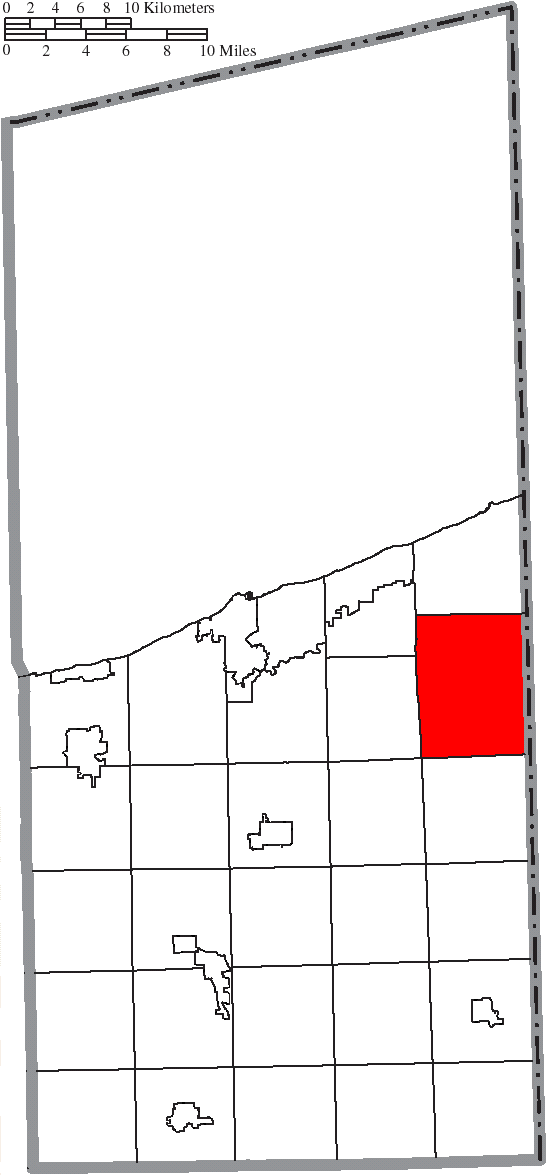
- Location of Monroe Township in Ashtabula County
- Coordinates: 41°51′5″N 80°34′53″W
- Country: United States
- State: Ohio
- County: Ashtabula

Area
  - Total: 38.5 sq mi (99.7 km^{2})
  - Land: 38.5 sq mi (99.6 km^{2})
  - Water: 0.039 sq mi (0.1 km^{2})
- Elevation: 920 ft (280 m)

Population (2020)
  - Total: 2,138
  - Density: 62/sq mi (23.9/km^{2})
- Time zone: UTC-5 (Eastern (EST))
  - Summer (DST): UTC-4 (EDT)
- FIPS code: 39-51296
- GNIS feature ID: 1085732
- Website: monroetwpohio.tripod.com

Monroe Township is one of the twenty-seven townships of Ashtabula County, Ohio, United States. The 2020 census found 2,138 people in the township.

== Geography ==
Located on the northeastern edge of the county, it borders the following townships and city:

- Conneaut - north
- Conneaut Township, Erie County, Pennsylvania - northeast
- Beaver Township, Crawford County, Pennsylvania - southeast
- Pierpont Township - south
- Denmark Township - southwest corner
- Sheffield Township - west
- Kingsville Township - northwest

No municipalities are located in Monroe Township.

== Name and history ==
It is one of twenty-two Monroe Townships statewide.

The first settler in Monroe Township was Stephen Moulton, who arrived from New York in 1799.

== Government ==
The township is governed by a three-member board of trustees, who are elected in November of odd-numbered years to a four-year term beginning on the following January 1. Two are elected in the year after the presidential election and one is elected in the year before it. There is also an elected township fiscal officer, who serves a four-year term beginning on April 1 of the year after the election, which is held in November of the year before the presidential election. Vacancies in the fiscal officership or on the board of trustees are filled by the remaining trustees. Currently, the members of the board are John Griggs, Roger Sherman, Jr, and Robert Pixley.
