= Pierpont Township, Ashtabula County, Ohio =

Township in Ohio, US

- Township
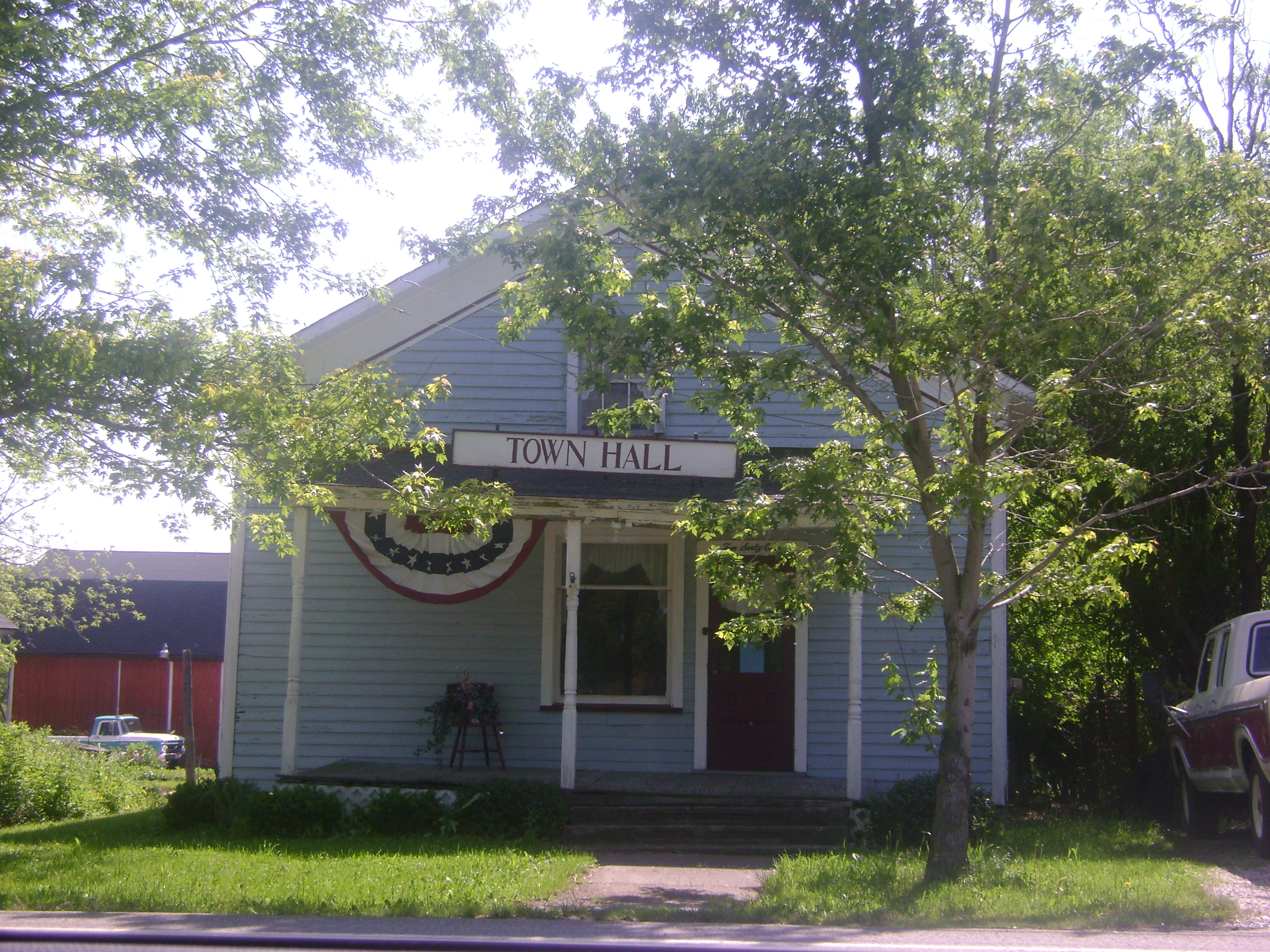
- Pierpont Township government building

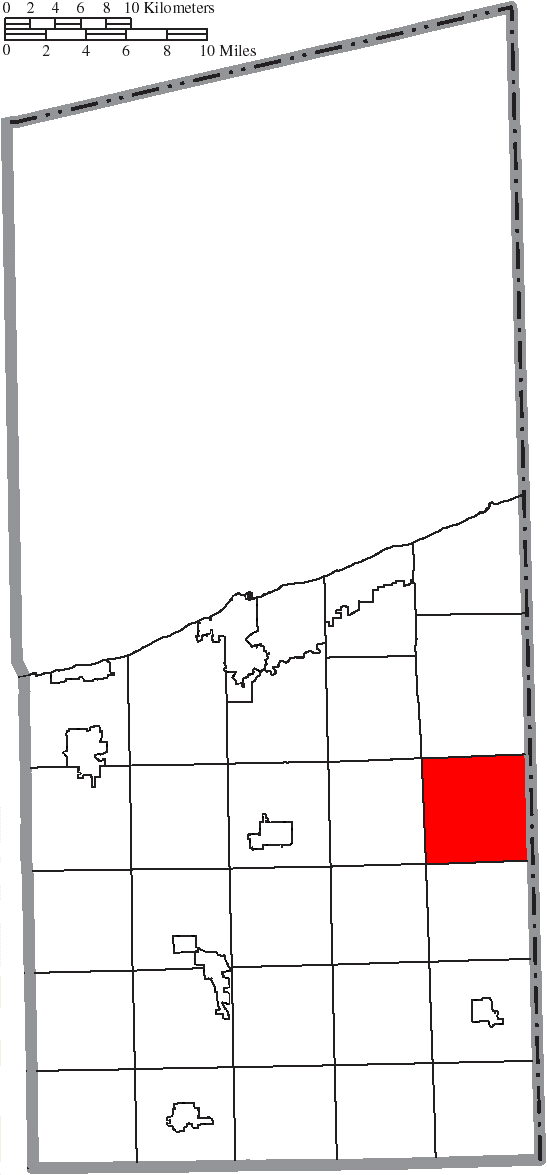
- Location of Pierpont Township in Ashtabula County
- Coordinates: 41°45′29″N 80°34′46″W
- Country: United States
- State: Ohio
- County: Ashtabula

Area
  - Total: 28.1 sq mi (72.7 km^{2})
  - Land: 28.1 sq mi (72.7 km^{2})
  - Water: 0 sq mi (0.0 km^{2})
- Elevation: 991 ft (302 m)

Population (2020)
  - Total: 1,158
  - Density: 46/sq mi (17.7/km^{2})
- Time zone: UTC-5 (Eastern (EST))
  - Summer (DST): UTC-4 (EDT)
- ZIP code: 44082
- Area code: 440
- FIPS code: 39-62568
- GNIS feature ID: 1085737
- Website: pierponttownship.com

Pierpont Township is one of the twenty-seven townships of Ashtabula County, Ohio, United States. The 2020 census found 1,158 people in the township.

== Geography ==
Located on the eastern edge of the county, it borders the following townships:

- Monroe Township - north
- Beaver Township, Crawford County, Pennsylvania - northeast corner
- Conneaut Township, Crawford County, Pennsylvania - southeast corner
- Richmond Township - south
- Dorset Township - southwest corner
- Denmark Township - west
- Sheffield Township - northwest corner

No municipalities are located in Pierpont Township, although the unincorporated community of Pierpont lies in the center of the township.

== Government ==
The township is governed by a three-member board of trustees, who are elected in November of odd-numbered years to a four-year term beginning on the following January 1. Two are elected in the year after the presidential election and one is elected in the year before it. There is also an elected township fiscal officer, who serves a four-year term beginning on April 1 of the year after the election, which is held in November of the year before the presidential election. Vacancies in the fiscal officership or on the board of trustees are filled by the remaining trustees. Currently, the board is composed of Brian Brent (chair), Pamela Hudson, and Mike Teter.

== History ==
Named for Pierpont Edwards, it is the only Pierpont Township statewide.

In 1790, at Buffalo, New York, the Seneca nation, represented by Joseph Brant, ceded their rights east of the Cuyahoga River to the Connecticut Land Company. The community was named after Pierpont Edwards, delegate to the Continental Congress and part owner of the Connecticut Land Company, who bought the land from Connecticut in 1795.

In 1798, Vermonter Edward Spear began settlement on lot 18 (on what was afterwards known as the "Beaver Meadows"), about two miles from the head of the east branch of the Ashtabula River. Spear erected the first log house in Pierpont Township (this building was burned by the Indians subsequent to his removal), and the next year (1799) raised the first crop of corn grown in the township. This was on the "Beaver Dam" and the surrounding meadows. Spear lived in this cabin until around 1801, when he took his departure. He was, however, during the early part of his sojourn in Pierpont, married, and fathered a child. This was the first white birth in the township. The date, sex, or subsequent history of this young pioneer is not known. In 1808, the first permanent settlers arrived in the township. They were Wareham Grant, Martin Vosburg, Harry Rockwell, and Ewins Wright. Grant and Vosburg erected their cabins about one mile north of the center. Rockwell built his cabin on lot 21, cleared a small piece of ground, sowed it to wheat, and in 1809, returned to Connecticut for his family.

The cabin of Wright was erected near the center of lot 17. In November 1811, Benjamin Matthews arrived from Washington, Massachusetts, and located temporarily near the cabin of Vosburg; he remained until the December following, when he moved into a cabin which he had in the meantime constructed.

In the summer of 1811, Amos Huntley arrived, selected his land, and made a beginning on lot 42. In the fall he returned to Massachusetts for his family, with whom he arrived the next season. The next settlers were Asa Benjamin, Joseph Dewey, and Samuel Brown. During the summer of 1811, a number of gentlemen came on from Massachusetts, selected their land, and the following year (1812), with their families, occupied these lands, and began business in earnest. Among these settlers were Aaron H. Holmes, Asa Leonard, Shiron Turner, Jepthat Turner, Amos Remington, Abijah Whitton, Archibald Gould, Ezra Cole, Ezekiel Brayman, William Read, Eli Prince, Edson Beals, Ashel Cleveland, Reuben Benjamin, and Zebina Rawson.

Pierpont Township was organized in 1818.

During the American Civil War, Captain Henry Hathaway raised a company of volunteers for the army and marched it to Browers Corners where he resigned the command to Captain Wilber Stevens, who marched it to Jefferson, its place of rendezvous. Soon after, he marched it into the Army, commanding Company B in the 29th Ohio Volunteer Infantry.

== Notable residents ==
- Chester Hardy Aldrich, 16th governor of Nebraska
