= Richmond Township, Ashtabula County, Ohio =

Township in Ohio, US

- Township
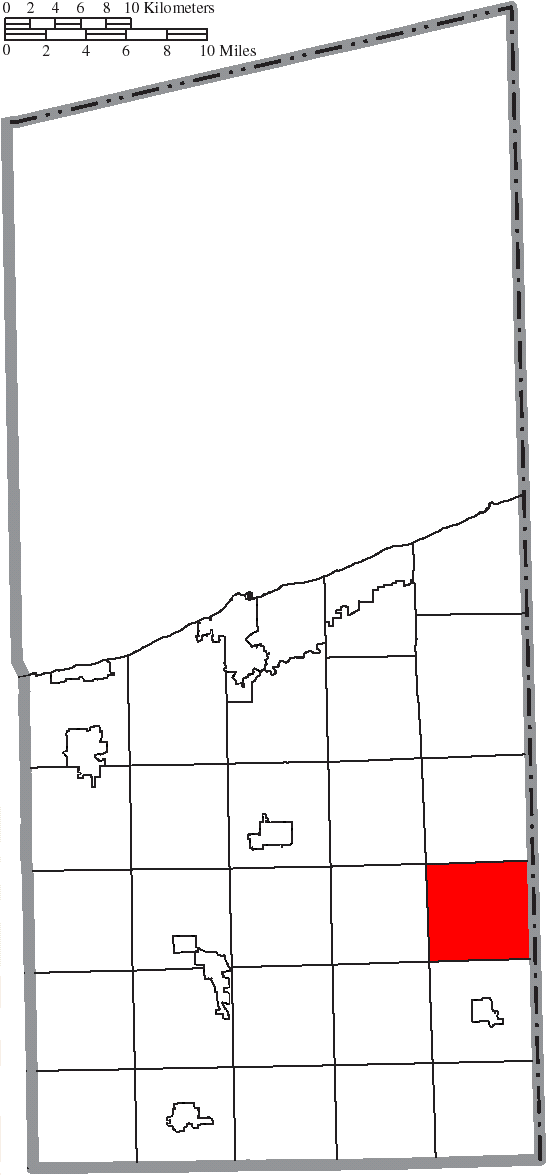
- Location of Richmond Township in Ashtabula County
- Coordinates: 41°40′27″N 80°33′43″W
- Country: United States
- State: Ohio
- County: Ashtabula

Area
  - Total: 25.6 sq mi (66.3 km^{2})
  - Land: 25.3 sq mi (65.5 km^{2})
  - Water: 0.31 sq mi (0.8 km^{2})
- Elevation: 1,020 ft (311 m)

Population (2020)
  - Total: 1,000
  - Density: 40/sq mi (15/km^{2})
- Time zone: UTC-5 (Eastern (EST))
  - Summer (DST): UTC-4 (EDT)
- FIPS code: 39-66796
- GNIS feature ID: 1085739

Historical population
| Census | Pop. | Note | %± |
|---|---|---|---|
| 1990 | 850 | | — |
| 2000 | 937 | | 10.2% |
| 2010 | 938 | | 0.1% |
| 2020 | 1,000 | | 6.6% |
U.S. Census:

Richmond Township is one of the twenty-seven townships of Ashtabula County, Ohio, United States. The 2020 census found 1,000 people in the township.

== Geography ==
Located on the eastern edge of the county, it borders the following townships:

- Pierpont Township - north
- Conneaut Township, Crawford County, Pennsylvania - east
- North Shenango Township, Pennsylvania - southeast
- Andover Township - south
- Cherry Valley Township - southwest corner
- Dorset Township - west
- Denmark Township - northwest corner

No municipalities are located in Richmond Township.

== Name and history ==
Statewide, the only other Richmond Township is located in Huron County.

The township was first settled in 1806. Richmond Township was organized in 1828. In later years, it became a center for the Underground Railroad.

== Government ==
The township is governed by a three-member board of trustees, who are elected in November of odd-numbered years to a four-year term beginning on the following January 1. Two are elected in the year after the presidential election and one is elected in the year before it. There is also an elected township fiscal officer, who serves a four-year term beginning on April 1 of the year after the election, which is held in November of the year before the presidential election. Vacancies in the fiscal officership or on the board of trustees are filled by the remaining trustees. Currently, the board is composed of chairman Thomas Hitchcock and members David Ballentine and Allen Slater.
