= Sheffield Township, Ashtabula County, Ohio =

Township in Ohio, US

- Township
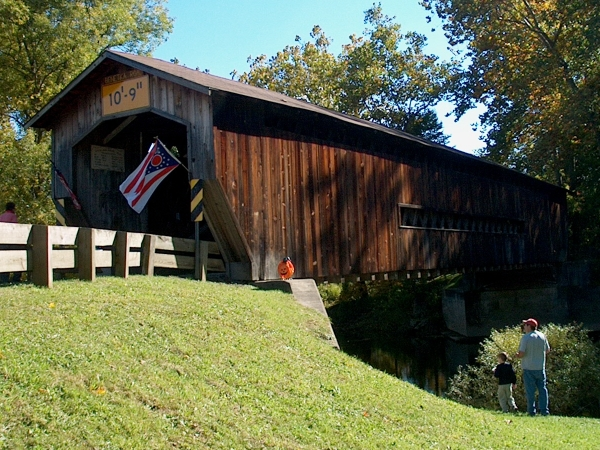
- Benetka Road Covered Bridge

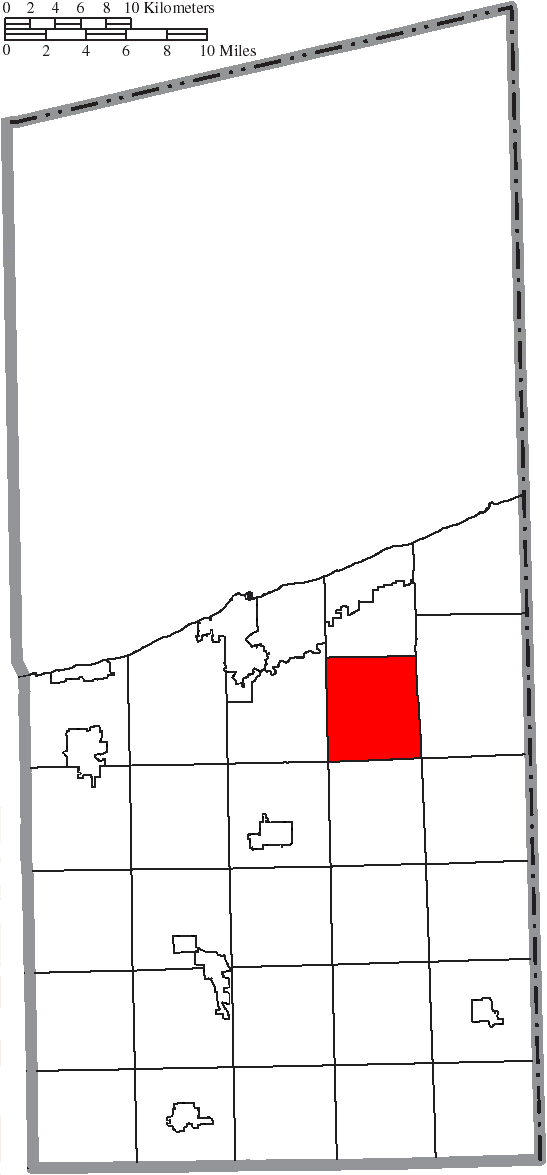
- Location of Sheffield Township in Ashtabula County
- Coordinates: 41°49′12″N 80°40′23″W
- Country: United States
- State: Ohio
- County: Ashtabula

Area
  - Total: 23.2 sq mi (60.2 km^{2})
  - Land: 23.2 sq mi (60.1 km^{2})
  - Water: 0.039 sq mi (0.1 km^{2})
- Elevation: 856 ft (261 m)

Population (2020)
  - Total: 1,499
  - Density: 64.6/sq mi (24.9/km^{2})
- Time zone: UTC-5 (Eastern (EST))
  - Summer (DST): UTC-4 (EDT)
- FIPS code: 39-72053
- GNIS feature ID: 1085743
- Website: www.sheffieldtwpash.com

Sheffield Township is one of the twenty-seven townships of Ashtabula County, Ohio, United States. The 2020 census found 1,499 people in the township.

== Geography ==
Located in the northeastern part of the county, it borders the following townships:

- Kingsville Township - north
- Monroe Township - east
- Pierpont Township - southeast corner
- Denmark Township - south
- Jefferson Township - southwest corner
- Plymouth Township - west

No municipalities are located in Sheffield Township.

== Name and history ==
Statewide, the only other Sheffield Township is located in Lorain County.

The first settlers in Sheffield Township were John Shaw, a former British soldier, and his wife, who came in 1812. When the township was organized in 1817 – 1820, John Griggs, first Justice of the Peace, changed the name to Sheffield, meaning "sheaf of fields", when it was disconnected from Kingsville Township in 1820. Prior to that time that portion of Kingsville Township had been called East Matherstown, to distinguish it from Matherstown, a name by which Saybrook Township was at one time known.

== Government ==
The township is governed by a three-member board of trustees, who are elected in November of odd-numbered years to a four-year term beginning on the following January 1. Two are elected in the year after the presidential election and one is elected in the year before it. There is also an elected township fiscal officer, who serves a four-year term beginning on April 1 of the year after the election, which is held in November of the year before the presidential election. Vacancies in the fiscal officer position or on the board of trustees are filled by the remaining trustees. The current members of the board are Alan Kohta, Troy Vanek, and Kirk White.
