= Sheffield Township, Lorain County, Ohio =

Township in Ohio, US

- Township
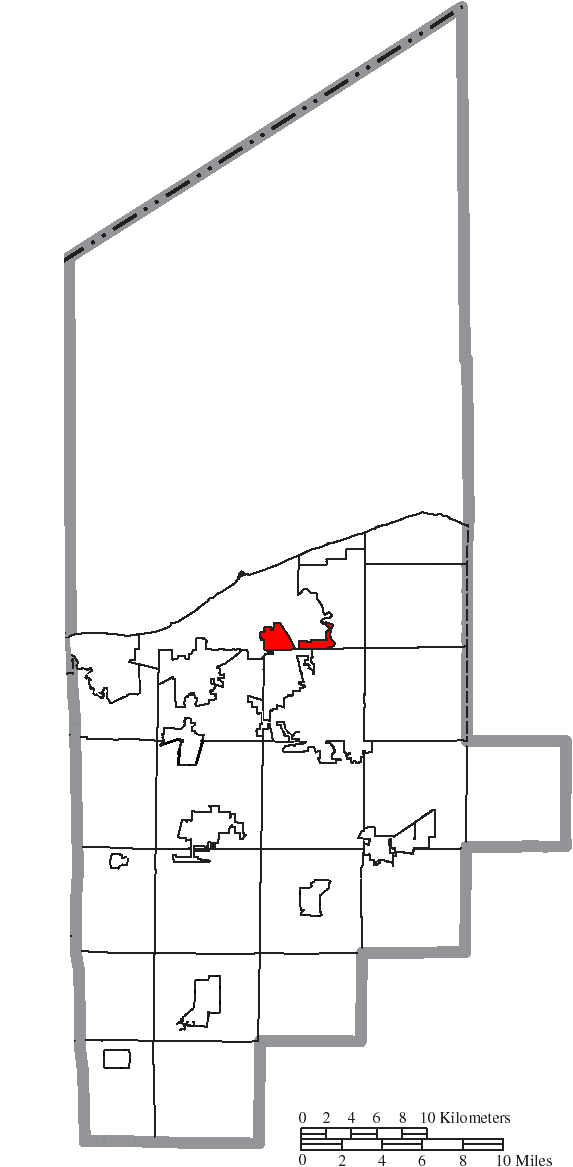
- Location of Sheffield Township in Lorain County
- Coordinates: 41°25′16″N 82°7′42″W
- Country: United States
- State: Ohio
- County: Lorain

Area
  - Total: 2.42 sq mi (6.26 km^{2})
  - Land: 2.39 sq mi (6.20 km^{2})
  - Water: 0.023 sq mi (0.06 km^{2})
- Elevation: 676 ft (206 m)

Population (2020)
  - Total: 3,963
  - Density: 1,660/sq mi (639/km^{2})
- Time zone: UTC-5 (Eastern (EST))
  - Summer (DST): UTC-4 (EDT)
- ZIP code: 44055
- Area code: 440
- FIPS code: 39-72067
- GNIS feature ID: 1086520
- Website: https://sites.google.com/view/sheffieldtownship/

Sheffield Township is one of the eighteen townships of Lorain County, Ohio, United States. As of the 2020 census the population was 3,963.

== Geography ==
Located in northern Lorain County, it borders the following townships and municipalities:

- Lorain - north and west
- Sheffield - east
- Elyria - southeast
- Elyria Township - south

No municipalities are located in Sheffield Township, other than the cities of Lorain and Sheffield Lake and village of Sheffield that have incorporated most of the original extent of the township.

== Name and history ==
Statewide, the only other Sheffield Township is located in Ashtabula County.

The first inhabitants of Sheffield Township began settling the area circa 1815.

== Government ==
The township is governed by a three-member board of trustees, who are elected in November of odd-numbered years to a four-year term beginning on the following January 1. Two are elected in the year after the presidential election and one is elected in the year before it. There is also an elected township fiscal officer, who serves a four-year term beginning on April 1 of the year after the election, which is held in November of the year before the presidential election. Vacancies in the fiscal officership or on the board of trustees are filled by the remaining trustees.

== Education ==
The school district in Sheffield Township is Clearview Local School District.
