= Ohio State Route 534 =

State highway in northeastern Ohio, US

State Route 534

Route information
- Maintained by ODOT
- Length: 69.41 mi (111.70 km)
- Existed: 1937–present

Major junctions
- South end: US 62 / SR 173 near Salem
- US 224 near Canfield; I-76 near Craig Beach; US 422 near Warren; US 322 near Orwell; US 6 near Roaming Shores; I-90 in Harpersfield; US 20 in Geneva
- North end: SR 531 in Geneva-on-the-Lake

Location
- Country: United States
- State: Ohio
- Counties: Mahoning, Trumbull, Ashtabula

Highway system
- Ohio State Highway System; Interstate; US; State; Scenic
← SR 533	→ SR 535

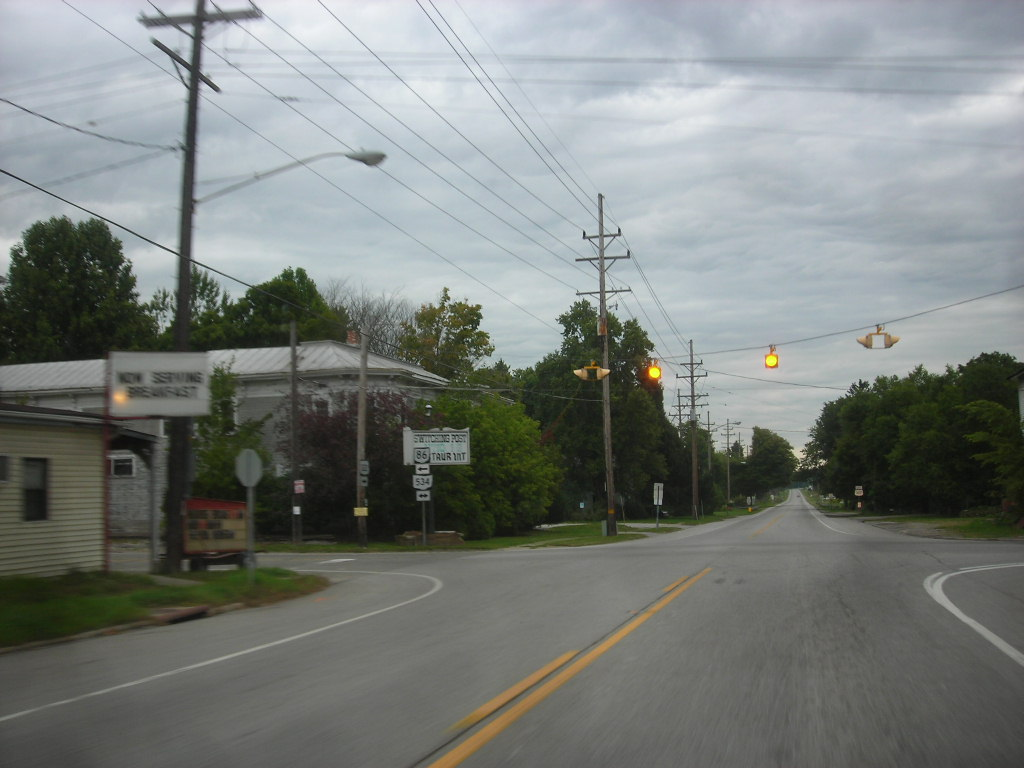
Ohio State Route 534's intersection in Windsor.

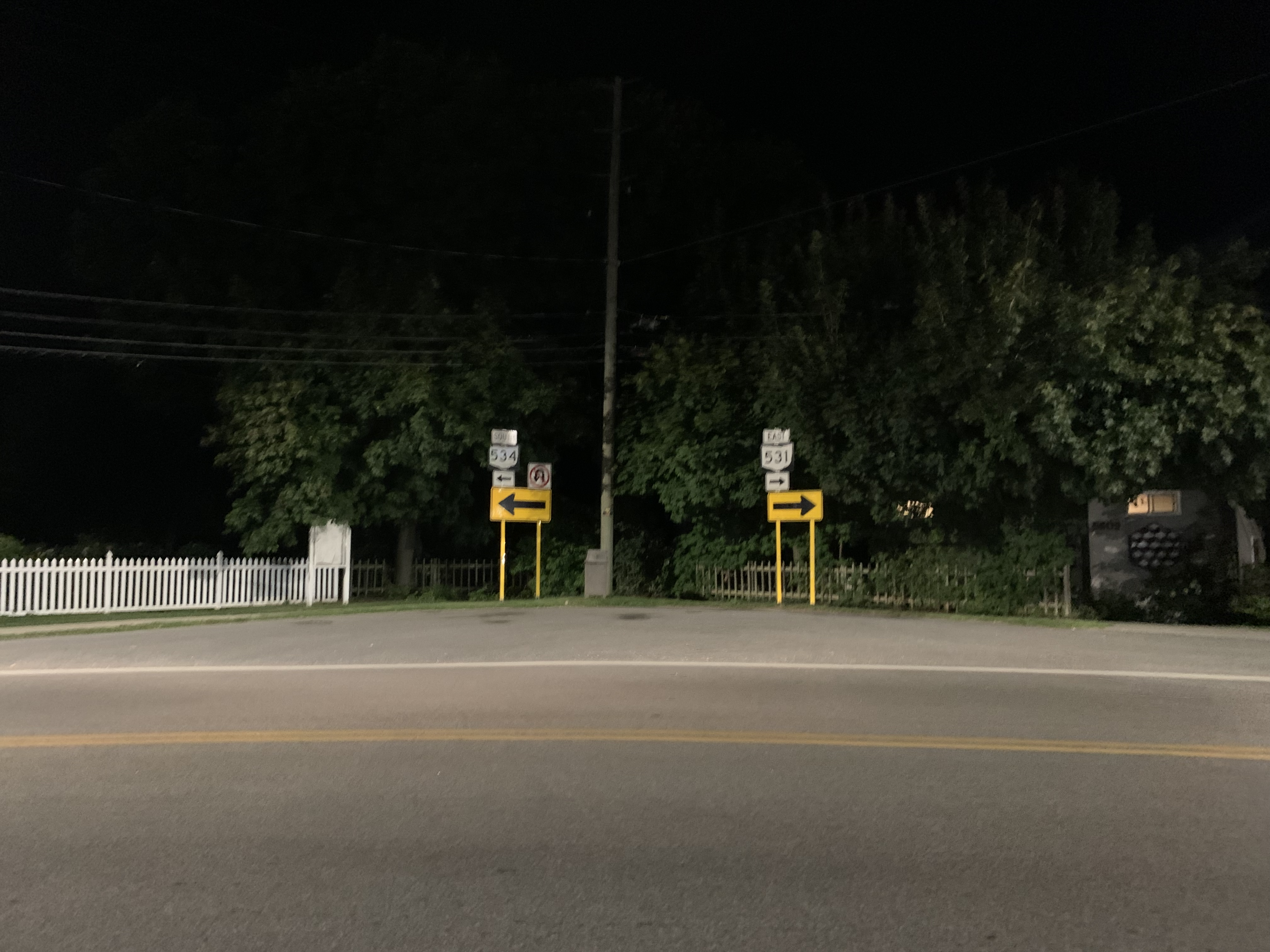
Ohio State Route 531 and Ohio State Route 534 in Geneva-on-the-Lake

State Route 534 (SR 534) is a north–south state highway in the northeastern portion of the U.S. state of Ohio. The southern terminus of SR 534 is at its junction with the duplex of U.S. Route 62 (US 62) and SR 173 nearly 4.50 miles (7.24 km) west of Salem. Its northern terminus is a curve in Geneva-on-the-Lake where the highway directly transitions into SR 531 at that route's western terminus.

== Route description ==
SR 534's path takes it through the western portions of Mahoning, Trumbull and Ashtabula Counties. The route starts at an intersection with US 62 / SR 173 in Damascus. The route continues north going through Berlin Center where it passes US 224 and further I-76 east of Lake Milton. Around 2 miles north the route enters Trumbull County where it continues north going through Newton Falls. The route goes past US 422 just south of the unincorporated community of Southington. Around 43.2 miles from the start the route enters Ashtabula County north and passes US 322 in Windsor. Further it passes US 6 at a Traffic circle in Hartsgrove. After crossing the Grand River, the route passes over I-90 and continues into Geneva where it passes US 20 / LECT. The route continues ends at a curve in Geneva-on-the-Lake, that turns into SR 531.

There are no segments of this highway that are included within the National Highway System (NHS). The NHS is a network of highways deemed most important for the nation's economy, mobility and defense.

== History ==
SR 534 debuted in 1937. It was originally routed along the majority of its current alignment, excepting a short stretch in northwestern Ashtabula County. Before its inception, SR 534 consisted of previously un-numbered roads south of Windsor, and SR 45 from Windsor north to Geneva-on-the-Lake.

Before 1962, SR 534 utilized the Harpersfield Covered Bridge to cross the Grand River near Harpersfield, in the vicinity of its junction with SR 307. In that year, a new alignment of the state highway was constructed, bypassing the covered bridge to the east. As a result, the former alignment that utilized the covered bridge to pass over the Grand River was turned over to Ashtabula County, and renamed as County Road 154 (CR 154).

== Major intersections ==
County	Location	mi	km	Destinations	Notes
Mahoning	Goshen Township	0.00	0.00	US 62; SR 173	Southern terminus on Columbiana–Mahoning County Line
Mahoning	Goshen Township	3.02	4.86	SR 165	Four-way stop intersection
Mahoning	Goshen Township	3.41	5.49	SR 14	
Mahoning	Berlin Township	8.60	13.84	US 224	
Mahoning	Milton Township	14.10	22.69	I-76	Exit 54 off of I-76, a diamond interchange
Trumbull	Braceville Township	21.98	35.37	SR 5	Signalized intersection
Trumbull	Braceville Township	24.26	39.04	SR 82	Four-way stop intersection with flashing beacon
Trumbull	Southington Township	28.81	46.37	US 422	Signalized intersection
Trumbull	Southington Township	29.57	47.59	SR 305	Five-way stop intersection
Trumbull	Farmington Township	35.46	57.07	SR 88	
Trumbull	Mesopotamia Township	40.15	64.62	SR 87	
Ashtabula	Windsor Township	45.63	73.43	US 322	
Ashtabula	Windsor Township	46.59	74.98	SR 86 north	T-intersection marking northwestern split of SR 86/SR 534 duplex; SR 86 departs to the northwest; Southern Terminus of SR 86
Ashtabula	Hartsgrove Township	50.94	81.98	US 6	Traffic circle
Ashtabula	Trumbull Township	54.83	88.24	SR 166 west	Eastern terminus of SR 166
Ashtabula	Harpersfield Township	61.83	99.51	SR 307	
Ashtabula	Harpersfield Township	62.55	100.66	I-90	Exit 218 off of I-90, a diamond interchange
Ashtabula	Geneva	63.95	102.92	SR 84	Signalized intersection
Ashtabula	Geneva	65.08	104.74	US 20 / LECT	Signalized intersection
Ashtabula	Geneva-on-the-Lake	69.41	111.70	SR 531 / LECT east	Northern terminus at curve that doubles as western terminus of SR 531
1.000 mi = 1.609 km; 1.000 km = 0.621 mi: Concurrency terminus
