= Ohio State Route 80 =

In Ohio, State Route 80 may refer to:

- Interstate 80, the only Ohio highway numbered 80 since 1962
- Ohio State Route 183, known as SR 80 from 1923 to 1962
- Ohio State Route 700, part of SR 80 from 1923 to 1942
