= Geneva-on-the-Lake, Ohio =

- Village
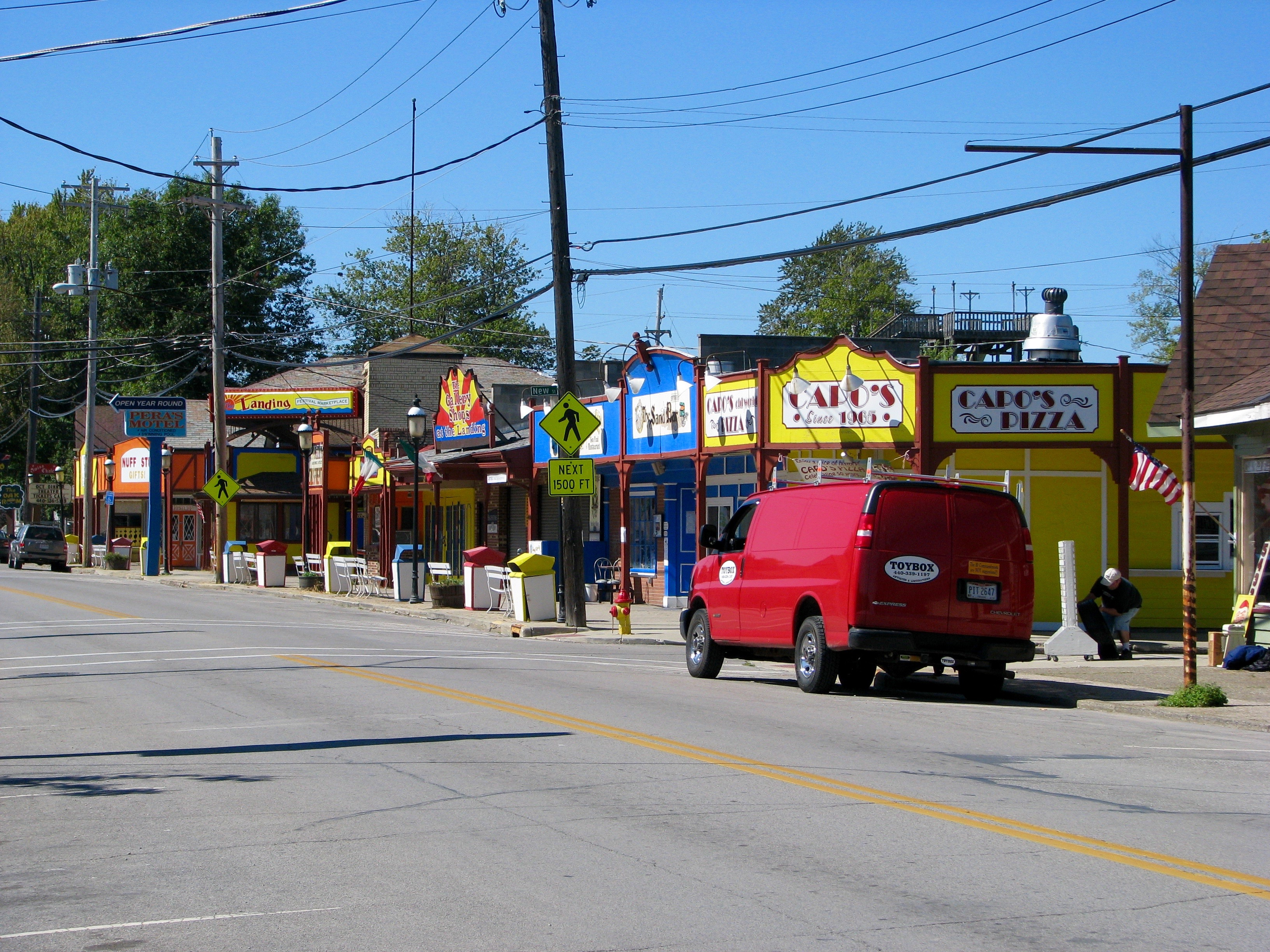
- State Route 531

- Logo
- Motto: "Ohio's First Summer Resort"
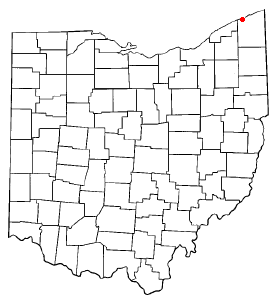
- Location of Geneva-on-the-Lake, Ohio

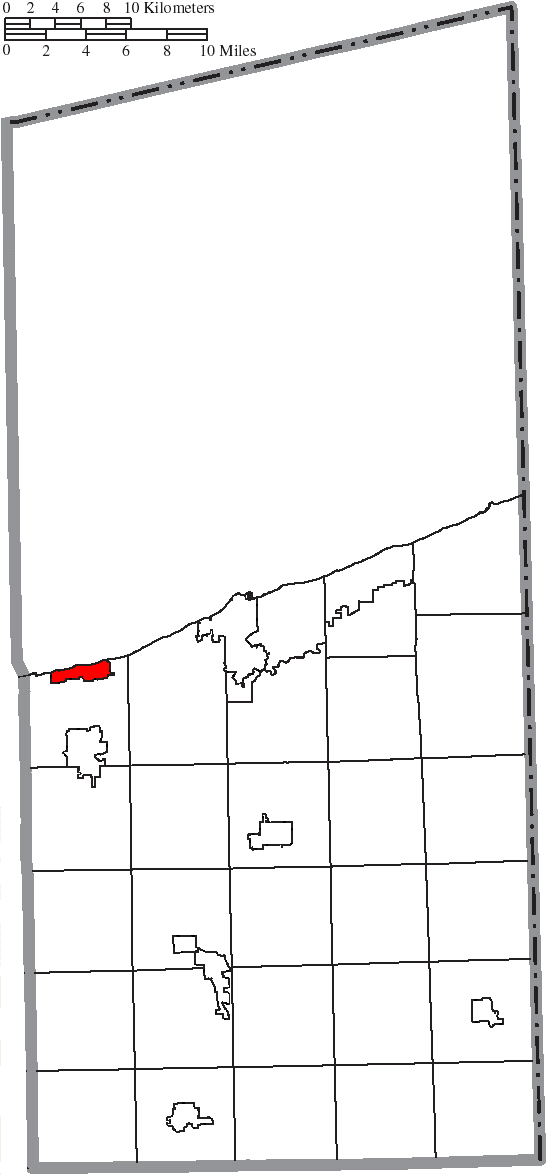
- Location of Geneva-on-the-Lake in Ashtabula County
- Coordinates: 41°51′34″N 80°57′14″W
- Country: United States
- State: Ohio
- County: Ashtabula
- Township: Geneva

Area
  - Total: 2.21 sq mi (5.73 km^{2})
  - Land: 2.20 sq mi (5.69 km^{2})
  - Water: 0.015 sq mi (0.04 km^{2})
- Elevation: 604 ft (184 m)

Population (2020)
  - Total: 916
  - Estimate (2023): 933
  - Density: 417.1/sq mi (161.04/km^{2})
- Time zone: UTC-5 (Eastern (EST))
  - Summer (DST): UTC-4 (EDT)
- ZIP code: 44041
- Area code: 440
- FIPS code: 39-29652
- GNIS feature ID: 1064710
- Website: genevaonthelake.org

Geneva-on-the-Lake is a village in Geneva Township, Ashtabula County, Ohio, United States, along the southern shore of Lake Erie. A small resort town, the population was 916 at the 2020 census. It is part of the Ashtabula micropolitan area, 46 miles (74 km) northeast of Cleveland.

== History ==
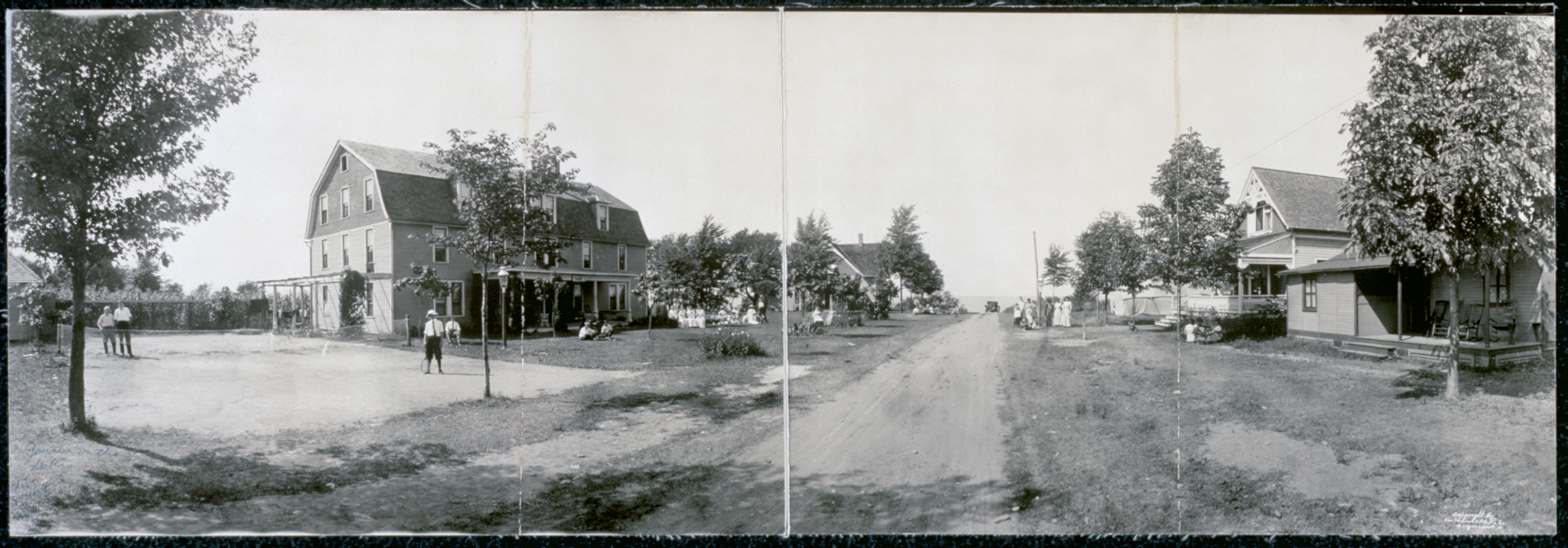
Four Gable Place (1913)

Settlement of the original area known as the Connecticut Western Reserve started in the early 1800s, as investors, farmers, and frontiersmen from New England and the Mid-Atlantic began to farm in the area and capitalize on the natural resources of Lake Erie and its shoreline. Industry along the lake shore continued to develop, including a lime burning business along Cowles Creek on the west, along with small-scale lumber processing and ship building at Indian Creek on the east. In 1869, Cullen Spencer and Edward Pratt purchased property known as Sturgeon Point (now Mapleton Beach) and opened it as a public picnic grounds with beach access. Later, a pony-powered carousel of sorts would be added which later help establish the town as Ohio's first summer resort.

In order to accommodate more visitors, residents built and established boarding houses and inns; the first being what is now the Jennie Munger Gregory Museum. Vacation residences continued to grow and expand through the early 1900s to include places such as the Idle-A-While and Shady Beach Inn. Erieview Park was started in 1945 by E.M. "Pop" Pera, and it grew to include nine adult and nine children's amusement park rides including The Fright Zone, one of three scary dark rides created by the Allen Herschel Co. In 1961, the park installed the Brat, a B. A. Schiff & Associates steel roller coaster supposedly named for a rowdy group of YMCA kids. The park closed in 2006, but the carousel is still in operation and the Ferris wheel was moved nearby.

Starting in 1964 with the purchase of Chestnut Grove, portions of land which were to become the Geneva-on-the-Lake State Park continued to grow through 1974 to include cabins, campgrounds, and a swimming beach.

On June 14, 2026, harsh weather conditions hit Northeast Ohio, causing the historic Ferris wheel to topple over. The wheel, known as #5 Big Eli, was owned by the Old Firehouse Winery. It is unknown whether the Ferris wheel can be replaced or repaired as of June 15, 2026.

== Geography ==
According to the United States Census Bureau, the village has a total area of 2.28 square miles (5.91 km^{2}), of which 2.26 square miles (5.85 km^{2}) is land and 0.02 square miles (0.05 km^{2}) is water.

== Demographics ==
Historical population
Census	Pop.	Note	%±
1930	102		—
1940	172		68.6%
1950	388		125.6%
1960	631		62.6%
1970	877		39.0%
1980	1,634		86.3%
1990	1,626		−0.5%
2000	1,545		−5.0%
2010	1,288		−16.6%
2020	916		−28.9%
2023 (est.)	933	▲	1.9%
U.S. Decennial Census

=== 2010 census ===
As of the census of 2010, there were 1,288 people, 589 households, and 326 families residing in the village. The population density was 569.9 inhabitants per square mile (220.0/km^{2}). There were 1,136 housing units at an average density of 502.7 per square mile (194.1/km^{2}). The racial makeup of the village was 95.9% White, 0.2% African American, 0.2% Native American, 0.2% Asian, 0.2% Pacific Islander, 0.8% from other races, and 2.4% from two or more races. Hispanic or Latino of any race were 3.2% of the population.

There were 589 households, of which 24.8% had children under the age of 18 living with them, 33.8% were married couples living together, 15.1% had a female householder with no husband present, 6.5% had a male householder with no wife present, and 44.7% were non-families. 34.5% of all households were made up of individuals, and 11.6% had someone living alone who was 65 years of age or older. The average household size was 2.19 and the average family size was 2.80.

The median age in the village was 42.7 years. 19.3% of residents were under the age of 18; 7.7% were between the ages of 18 and 24; 26.4% were from 25 to 44; 32.7% were from 45 to 64; and 13.8% were 65 years of age or older. The gender makeup of the village was 50.7% male and 49.3% female.

=== 2000 census ===
As of the census of 2000, there were 1,545 people, 665 households, and 395 families residing in the village. The population density was 760.9 inhabitants per square mile (293.8/km^{2}). There were 1,167 housing units at an average density of 574.7 per square mile (221.9/km^{2}). The racial makeup of the village was 96.18% White, 0.58% African American, 0.32% Native American, 0.32% Asian, 1.04% from other races, and 1.55% from two or more races. Hispanic or Latino of any race were 2.20% of the population.

There were 665 households, out of which 30.2% had children under the age of 18 living with them, 38.5% were married couples living together, 15.8% had a female householder with no husband present, and 40.5% were non-families. 31.9% of all households were made up of individuals, and 9.0% had someone living alone who was 65 years of age or older. The average household size was 2.32 and the average family size was 2.90.

In the village, the population was spread out, with 26.6% under the age of 18, 8.9% from 18 to 24, 31.0% from 25 to 44, 20.7% from 45 to 64, and 12.8% who were 65 years of age or older. The median age was 36 years. For every 100 females there were 99.6 males. For every 100 females age 18 and over, there were 96.9 males.

The median income for a household in the village was $29,583, and the median income for a family was $31,786. Males had a median income of $28,375 versus $20,655 for females. The per capita income for the village was $15,860. About 15.0% of families and 19.1% of the population were below the poverty line, including 28.8% of those under age 18 and 6.3% of those age 65 or over.

== Culture ==
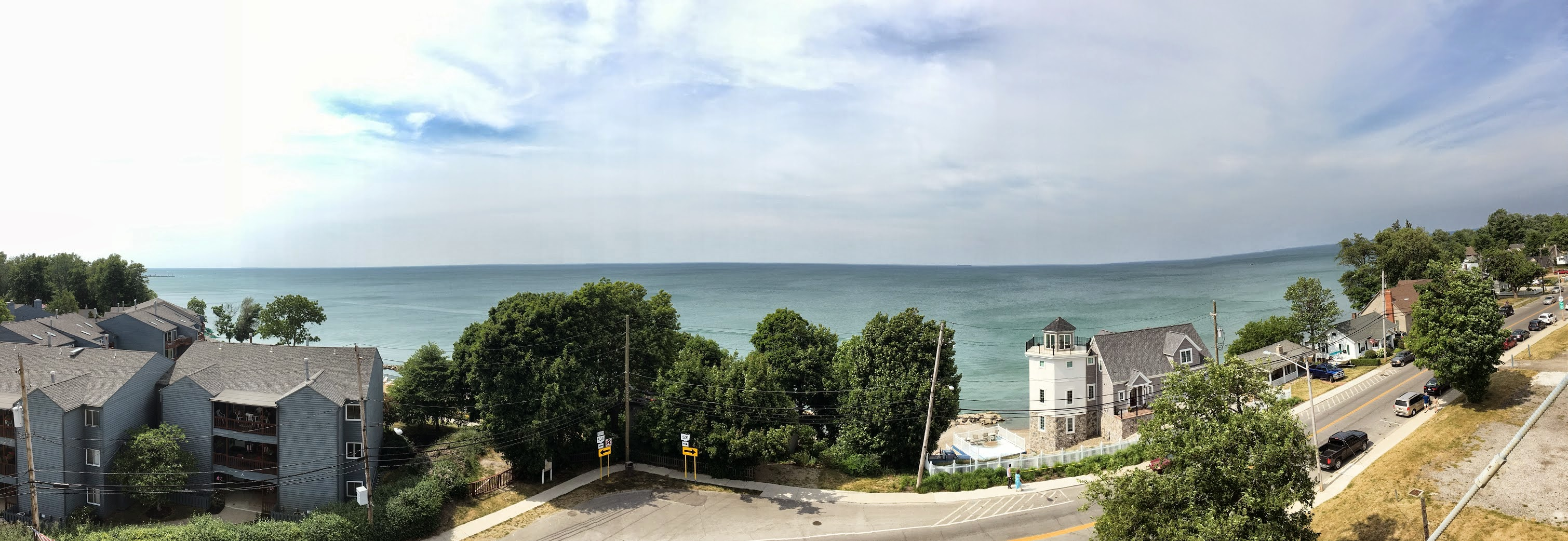
Lake Erie shoreline

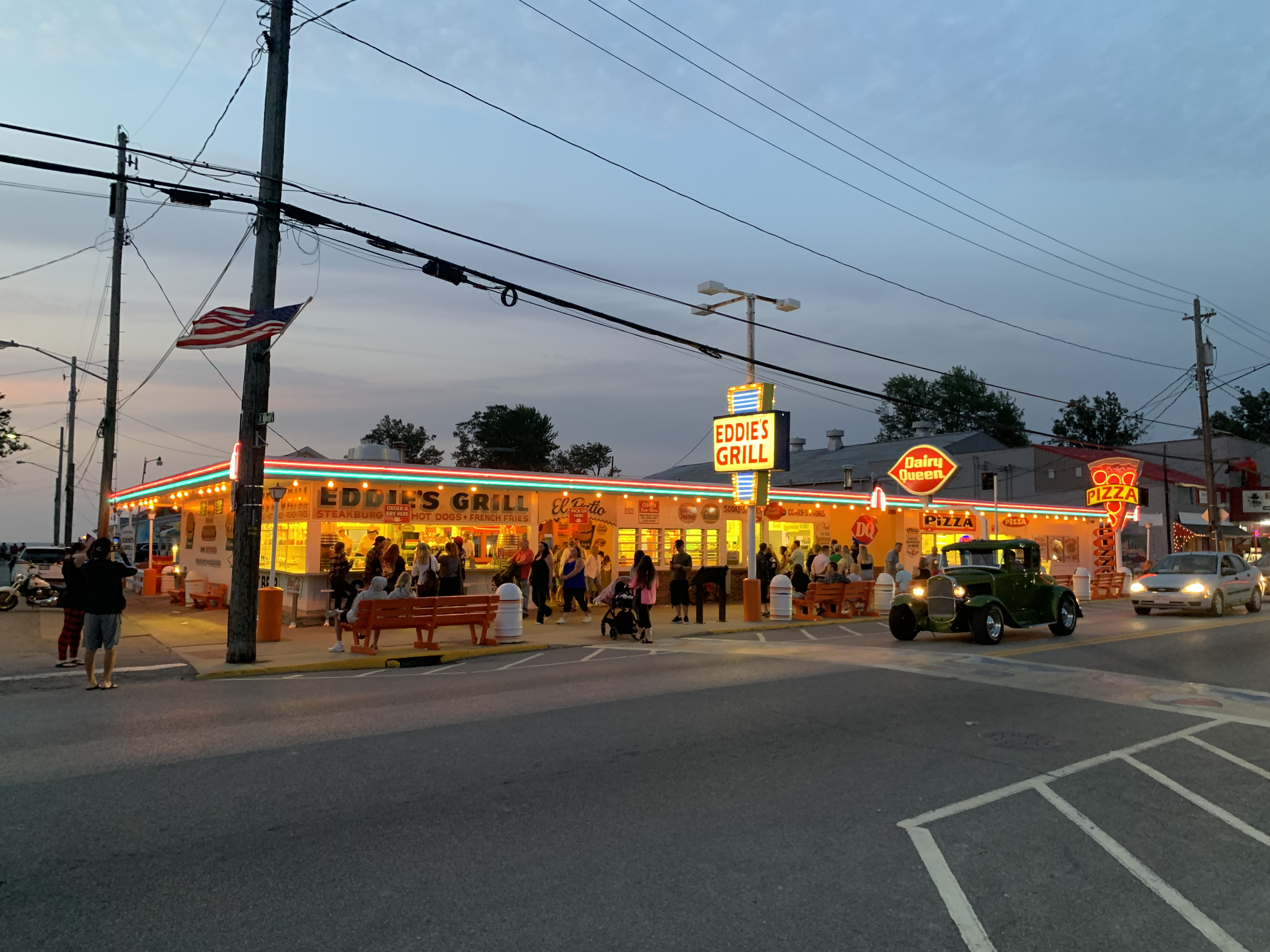
Eddie's Grill

Geneva-on-the-Lake's central attraction is "the Strip", a section of State Route 531 which is lined with parks, restaurants, and arcades, and has been a tourist attraction for decades. In 2004, the Lodge and Conference Center at Geneva State Park opened on the lakefront.

One of a number of seasonal events is the "Thunder on The Strip," an annual Biker Rally held the weekend after Labor Day. Started in 2007, "Thunder on The Strip" attracts thousands of motorcyclists from around the country and brings a boost to local business.

== Education ==
The Geneva Area City School District provides K–12 education to students in Geneva-on-the-Lake. The district has three elementary schools (Geneva Platt R. Spencer Elementary, Cork Elementary and Austinburg Elementary), one middle school (Geneva Middle School) and one high school (Geneva High School). The elementary schools serve students in grades K–5, while the middle school and high schools serve students in grades 6–8 and 9–12 respectively. The district has an open enrollment policy, allowing students from the entire county, as well as Lake and Geauga Counties to enroll.

== Notable people ==
- Isaac Arthur, science communication, YouTuber and futurist
- Sarah Fowler Arthur, member of the Ohio House of Representatives from the 99th district
- Ransom E. Olds, founder of the Oldsmobile car company
