= Ashtabula Harbour Commercial District =

Historic district in Ohio, United States

- Ashtabula Harbor Commercial District
- U.S. National Register of Historic Places
- U.S. Historic district
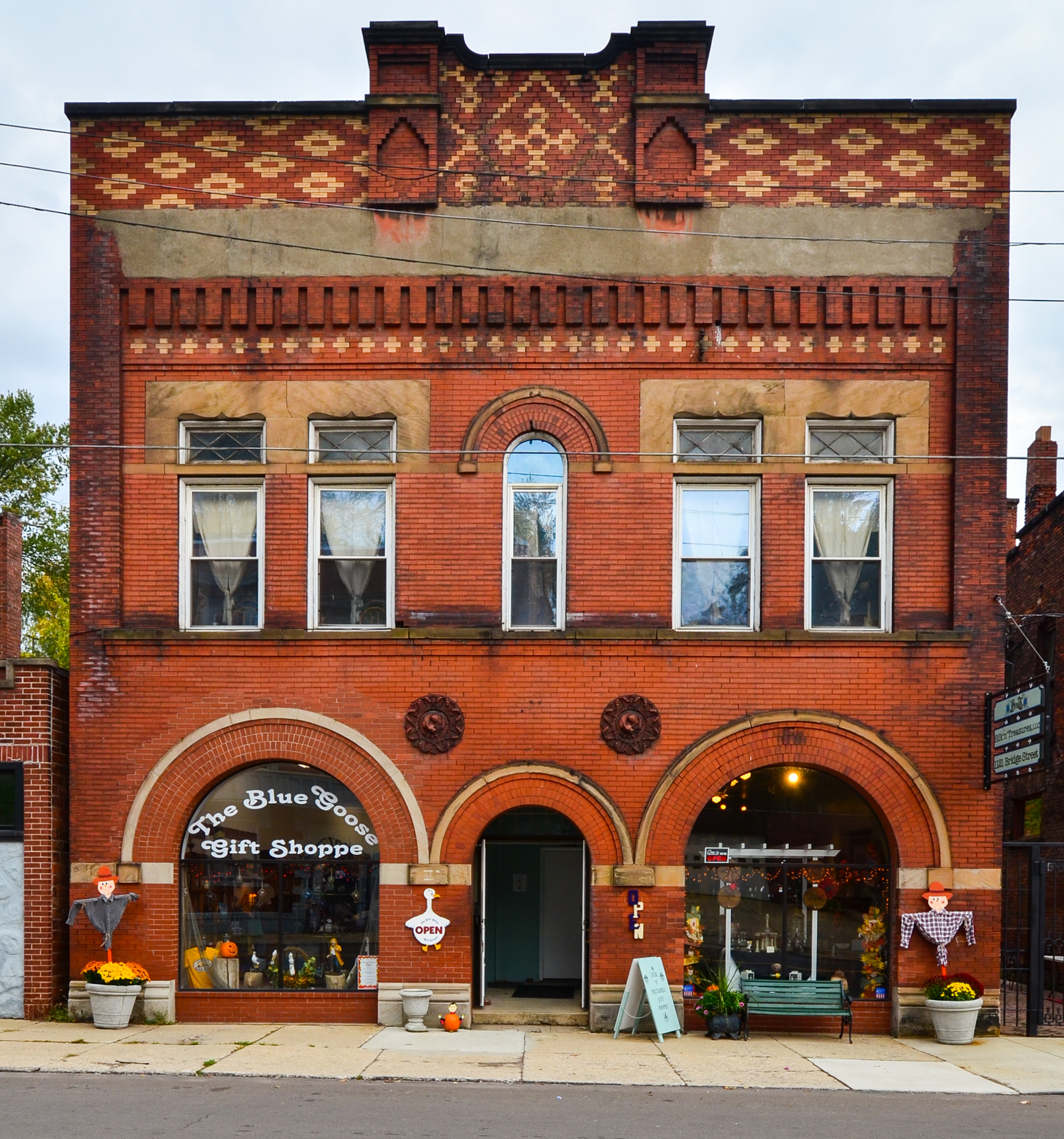
- Building west of Hulbert Avenue

- Location within Ohio Location within the United States
- Location: Both sides of W. 5th St. from the 1200 block to the Ashtabula River in Ashtabula, Ohio
- Coordinates: 41°53′58″N 80°47′59″W
- Area: 4.5 acres (1.8 ha)
- Built: 1870
- Architectural style: Neoclassical, Late Victorian, Italianate
- Website: historicashtabulaharbor.org
- NRHP reference No.: 75001311
- Added to NRHP: September 5, 1975

The Ashtabula Harbor Commercial District is a historic district in the northern section of the city of Ashtabula, Ohio, United States. Comprising a commercial section near the city's Lake Erie waterfront, the district includes buildings constructed largely in the late nineteenth century, at which time Ashtabula was a flourishing port city.

Most of the buildings in the district were constructed between 1865 and 1878, although occasional buildings were erected in the early 1900s. The district's area has long been commercial; from its earliest years, the street running through the district was known as Bridge Street, because it terminates at a bridge spanning the Ashtabula River. Until it became part of the city of Ashtabula in the 1870s, Ashtabula Harbor was a separate municipality (it lies two miles north of the city's downtown), and Bridge Street its commercial sector. The area's buildings vary greatly in appearance, with some surpassing others by several feet. Designs include examples of the Italianate, Queen Anne, and Neoclassical styles, while the construction materials are primarily brick with occasional frame structures.

The Ashtabula Harbor Commercial District was designated in 1975 and listed on the National Register of Historic Places at the same time, qualifying both because of its historically significant architecture and because of its place in area history; it gained this designation largely because it retains its late nineteenth-century appearance as a flourishing harbor's business district. Seventy-five contributing properties are located within the district's boundaries. In 1978, the city government created the Ashtabula Harbor Historical District, a substantially larger area including numerous residential streets as well as the federally designated commercial street. Since 2010, the city district's boundaries have extended from the river bridge to Lake Avenue and from Morton Drive along the river to the Walnut Beach Park on the lake. City ordinance forbids exterior alterations to buildings in the federally designated district unless the owner has first completed a process of gaining approval from the city's historic preservation review board.
