= Ohio State Route 84 =

State highway in northeastern Ohio, US

State Route 84

Route information
- Maintained by ODOT
- Length: 63.34 mi (101.94 km)
- Existed: 1924–present

Major junctions
- West end: US 6 / US 20 in Euclid
- I-90 in Wickliffe; I-90 / SR 193 near North Kingsville; SR 7 near Kelloggsville
- East end: PA 226 near Conneaut

Location
- Country: United States
- State: Ohio
- Counties: Cuyahoga, Lake, Ashtabula

Highway system
- Ohio State Highway System; Interstate; US; State; Scenic
← SR 83	→ SR 85

State Route 84 (SR 84) is an east–west state highway in the northeastern portion of the U.S. state of Ohio. Its western terminus is along US 6 at US 20 in Euclid, and its eastern terminus is at the Pennsylvania state line about 10 miles (16 km) south-southeast of Conneaut; Pennsylvania Route 226 continues eastward.

A portion of SR 84 runs along the historic Johnnycake Ridge Road. SR 84 is not signed along the US 6 concurrency.

== History ==
Route 84 was established in 1923 and originally ran from 1-mile (1.6 km) south of Madison to 2 miles (3.2 km) west of Andover along the current alignment of State Route 307; from 1-mile (1.6 km) south of Madison to Dorset; and from Dorset to West Andover. It was expanded in 1926 to Willoughby Hills along a previously unnumbered road. In 1931, the route was truncated at Dorset and Dorset to West Andover was decertified. In 1935, Route 84 was rerouted from Madison to Ashtabula along the previous State Route 307 alignment, which was unnumbered before 1933. The former alignment from south of Madison to Dorset was certified as State Route 307. In 1938, it was extended to the Pennsylvania state line along the former alignment of State Route 83 from Ashtabula to Kelloggsville, which was unnumbered before 1926, and along a previously unnumbered road from Kelloggsville to the state line.

== Major junctions ==
County	Location	mi	km	Destinations	Notes
Cuyahoga	Euclid	0.00	0.00	US 6 west / US 20 (Euclid Avenue)	Western end of US 6 concurrency
Cuyahoga	Richmond Heights	2.20	3.54	SR 175 (Richmond Road)	
Lake	Willoughby Hills	3.28	5.28	US 6 east (Chardon Road) / Bishop Road	Eastern end of US 6 concurrency
Lake	Wickliffe	3.67	5.91	I-90 to I-271 south / SR 2 – Erie, PA, Columbus, Cleveland, Painesville	Exit 187 (I-90)
Lake	Willoughby	6.46	10.40	SR 91 (S.O.M. Center Road)	
Lake	Willoughby	8.35	13.44	SR 174 south (River Road) / Willoughcroft Road	Western end of SR 174 concurrency
Lake	Willoughby	8.69	13.99	SR 174 north (Ridge Road) / Oakdale Avenue	Eastern end of SR 174 concurrency
Lake	Mentor	10.99	17.69	SR 306 (Broadmoor Road) to I-90	
Lake	Mentor	13.19	21.23	SR 615 (Center Street) to I-90	
Lake	Concord Township	18.98	30.55	SR 44 to I-90 / SR 2 – Chardon, Painesville	Interchange
Lake	Painesville	20.53	33.04	SR 86 east (Painesville Warren Road)	Western end of SR 86 concurrency
Lake	Painesville	21.33	34.33	SR 86 west (South State Street) / East Walnut Avenue	Eastern end of SR 86 concurrency
Lake	Madison	32.31	52.00	SR 528 south (River Street) to I-90	Western end of SR 528 concurrency
Lake	Madison	32.26	51.92	SR 528 north (Lake Street)	Eastern end of SR 528 concurrency
Ashtabula	Geneva	37.79	60.82	SR 534	
Ashtabula	Saybrook Township	43.44	69.91	SR 45 – Rock Creek	
Ashtabula	Ashtabula Township	49.53	79.71	SR 11 to I-90 – Youngstown	Interchange
Ashtabula	Kingsville Township	54.53	87.76	SR 193 north / East Main Street – North Kingsville	Western end of SR 193 concurrency
Ashtabula	Kingsville Township	55.17– 55.45	88.79– 89.24	I-90 – Cleveland, Erie, PA	Exit 235 (I-90)
Ashtabula	Kingsville Township	55.38	89.13	SR 193 south	Eastern end of SR 193 concurrency
Ashtabula	Monroe Township	60.60	97.53	SR 7 – Andover, Conneaut	
Ashtabula	Monroe Township	63.34	101.94	PA 226 east – Albion	Pennsylvania state line
1.000 mi = 1.609 km; 1.000 km = 0.621 mi: Concurrency terminus
