= Ohio State Route 528 =

State highway in northeastern Ohio, US

State Route 528

Route information
- Maintained by ODOT
- Length: 30.37 mi (48.88 km)
- Existed: 1937–present

Major junctions
- South end: US 422 / SR 88 / SR 168 in Parkman
- US 322 in Huntsburg; US 6 in Montville; I-90 in Madison
- North end: US 20 near Madison

Location
- Country: United States
- State: Ohio
- Counties: Geauga, Lake

Highway system
- Ohio State Highway System; Interstate; US; State; Scenic
← SR 527	→ SR 529

State Route 528 (SR 528) is north–south state highway in the northeastern portion of the U.S. state of Ohio. The southern terminus is at an intersection with U.S. Route 422 (US 422) and SR 88 in the village of Parkman, about 6½ miles south of Middlefield, and its northern terminus is at U.S. Route 20 about 2 miles (3.2 km) north of Madison. The entire highway is a two-lane highway, that passes through woodland and farmland. SR 528 was commissioned in the mid-1930s on the same route. The highway was extended in 1940, to US 20, replacing another state route. In the mid-1960s the route was extended south to US 422.

== Route description ==
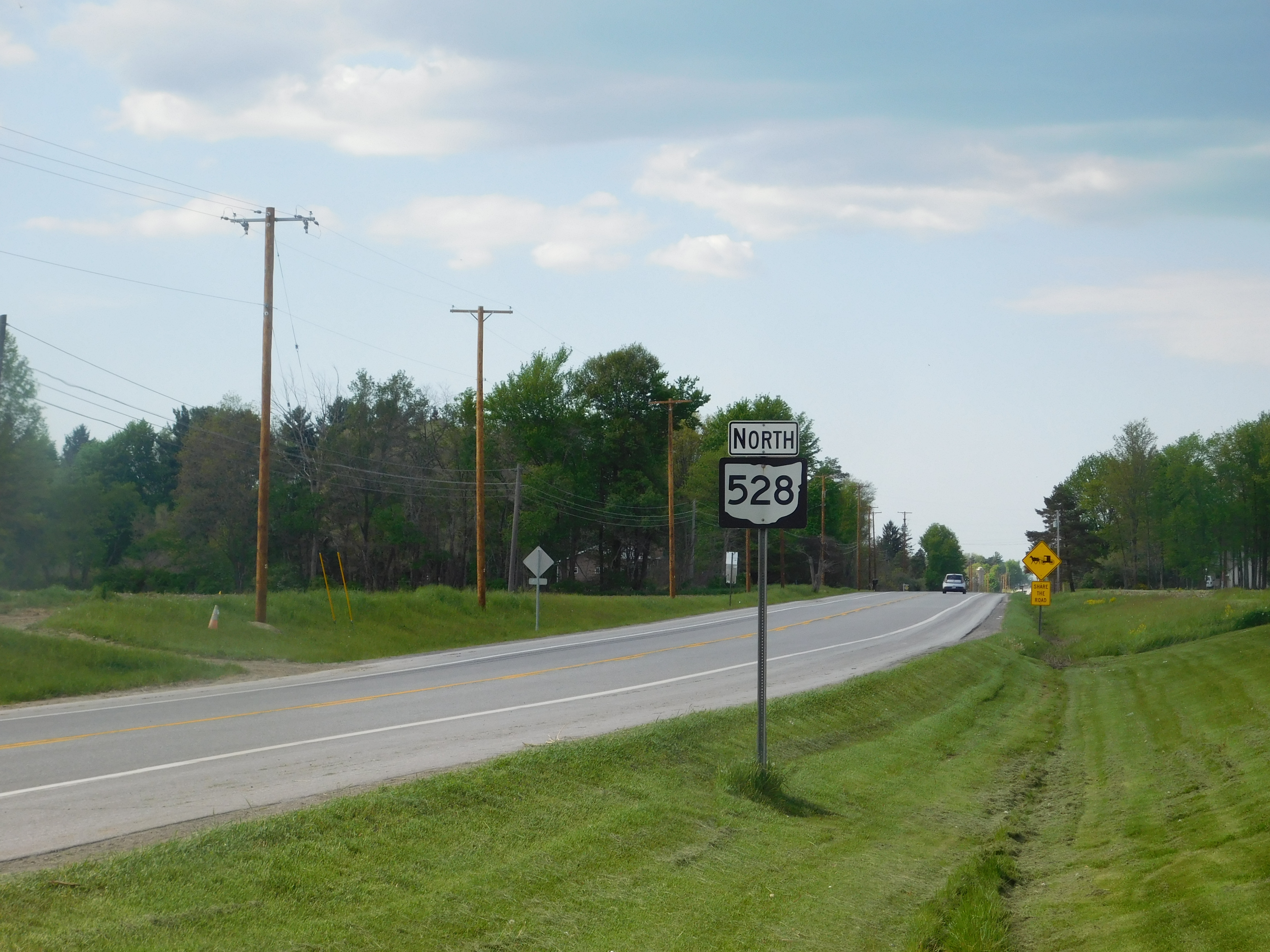
SR 528 northbound in Parkman Township

SR 528 begins at a traffic signal with US 422 and SR 88, in Parkman. The southern terminus of SR 528 is also the southern terminus of SR 168. The route heads north concurrent with SR 88 and SR 168. The route passes through residential properties, before SR 168 turns due west leaving the concurrency. North of SR 168, the highway passes through woodland, with some houses, before SR 88 turns due east. SR 528 continues north passing through farmland and woodland, as a two-lane highway. The route has as an intersection with SR 608, south of Middlefield. The highway passes east of Middlefield having an intersection with SR 87. SR 528 continues north having an intersection with US 322 in Huntsburg Township. The road has an intersection with SR 86, followed by an intersection with US 6. North of US 6, SR 528 has an intersection with SR 166, before crossing into Lake County. After crossing into Lake County, the route crosses the Grand River and has a T-intersection with SR 307. The highway has an interchange with Interstate 90 (I–90). After I–90, SR 528 enters Madison, passing through residential properties. The road turns east concurrent with SR 84. SR 528 leaves SR 84 and heads north passes through commercial properties. The road crosses a CSX railroad track and a Norfolk Southern railroad tracks, before passing through residential properties. The road leaves Madison and passes through farmland. SR 528 has its northern terminus at a traffic signal with US 20. Continuing north after SR 528 ends is Lake County Road 7. No section of SR 528 is incorporated within the National Highway System (NHS).

== History ==
SR 528 was commissioned in 1937, originally routed from SR 87 to 4 miles (6.4 km) north of Montville. In 1940 the route was extended north to U.S. Route 20, north of Madison, replacing the north–south section of SR 166. The route was extended to its current southern terminus in 1965.

== Major intersections ==
County	Location	mi	km	Destinations	Notes
Geauga	Parkman Township	0.00	0.00	US 422 / SR 88 west / SR 168 begins	Southern terminus of SR 528 and SR 168; southern end of SR 88 and SR 168 concurrency
Geauga	Parkman Township	0.21	0.34	SR 168 north	Northern terminus of SR 168 concurrency
Geauga	Parkman Township	1.29	2.08	SR 88 east	Northern end of SR 88 concurrency
Geauga	Middlefield Township	4.59	7.39	SR 608 north (Old State Road)	Southern terminus of SR 608
Geauga	Middlefield	6.35	10.22	SR 87	
Geauga	Huntsburg Township	11.48	18.48	US 322	
Geauga	Montville Township	15.53	24.99	SR 86 (Plank Road)	
Geauga	Montville Township	16.48	26.52	US 6	
Geauga	Thompson Township	20.51	33.01	SR 166 (Rock Creek Road)	
Lake	Madison Township	26.44– 26.97	42.55– 43.40	SR 307 east	Western terminus of SR 307
Lake	Madison	27.24	43.84	I-90	Exit 212 (I-90)
Lake	Madison	28.12	45.25	SR 84 west	Western end of SR 84 concurrency
Lake	Madison	28.26	45.48	SR 84 east	Eastern end of SR 84 concurrency
Lake	North Madison	30.37	48.88	US 20 / LECT	
1.000 mi = 1.609 km; 1.000 km = 0.621 mi: Concurrency terminus
