= Ohio State Route 166 =

State highway in northeastern Ohio, US

State Route 166

Route information
- Maintained by ODOT
- Length: 11.40 mi (18.35 km)
- Existed: 1923–present

Major junctions
- West end: US 6 near Chardon
- East end: SR 534 / CR 12 near Rock Creek

Location
- Country: United States
- State: Ohio
- Counties: Geauga, Ashtabula

Highway system
- Ohio State Highway System; Interstate; US; State; Scenic
← SR 165	→ SR 167

State Route 166 (SR 166) is an east–west state highway in the northeastern portion of the U.S. state of Ohio. The western terminus of State Route 166 is at a T-intersection with U.S. Route 6 just over 3 miles (4.8 km) northeast of Chardon. Its eastern terminus is at State Route 534 about 5 miles (8.0 km) west of Rock Creek.

== Route description ==
State Route 166 starts in Hambden, traveling northeast through the northwest corner of Montville Township, passing by Curtis Airport. After it crosses into Thompson Township, it curves to face the east. It then crosses the county line into Ashtabula County, ending at SR 534, near Rock Creek. No segment of this highway is a part of the National Highway System, a system of highways identified as most important for the economy, mobility and defense of the nation.

== History ==
The debut of State Route 166 took place in 1923. The original routing of State Route 166 consisted of the existing route of State Route 166 from its current western terminus northeast of Chardon to its junction with State Route 528, and State Route 528 from that intersection north to that highway's current northern terminus north of Madison. In 1939, State Route 166 was re-routed. From the current junction of State Route 166 and State Route 528, State Route 166 was routed east, replacing what was formerly designated as State Route 522, to the intersection that marks State Route 166's current eastern terminus at State Route 534 west of Rock Creek. In turn, State Route 528 was extended northward, replacing what was the north-south leg of State Route 166.

== Major intersections ==
County	Location	mi	km	Destinations	Notes
Geauga	Hambden Township	0.00	0.00	US 6	
Geauga	Thompson Township	4.09	6.58	SR 86 (Plank Road)	
Geauga	Thompson Township	6.59	10.61	SR 528 (Madison Road) – Thompson Township, Geauga County, Middlefield	
Ashtabula	Trumbull Township	11.40	18.35	SR 534 / CR 12 (Footville-Richmond Road) – Geneva, Windsor	
1.000 mi = 1.609 km; 1.000 km = 0.621 mi
