= Ashtabula lift bridge =

- West Fifth Street Bridge
- U.S. National Register of Historic Places
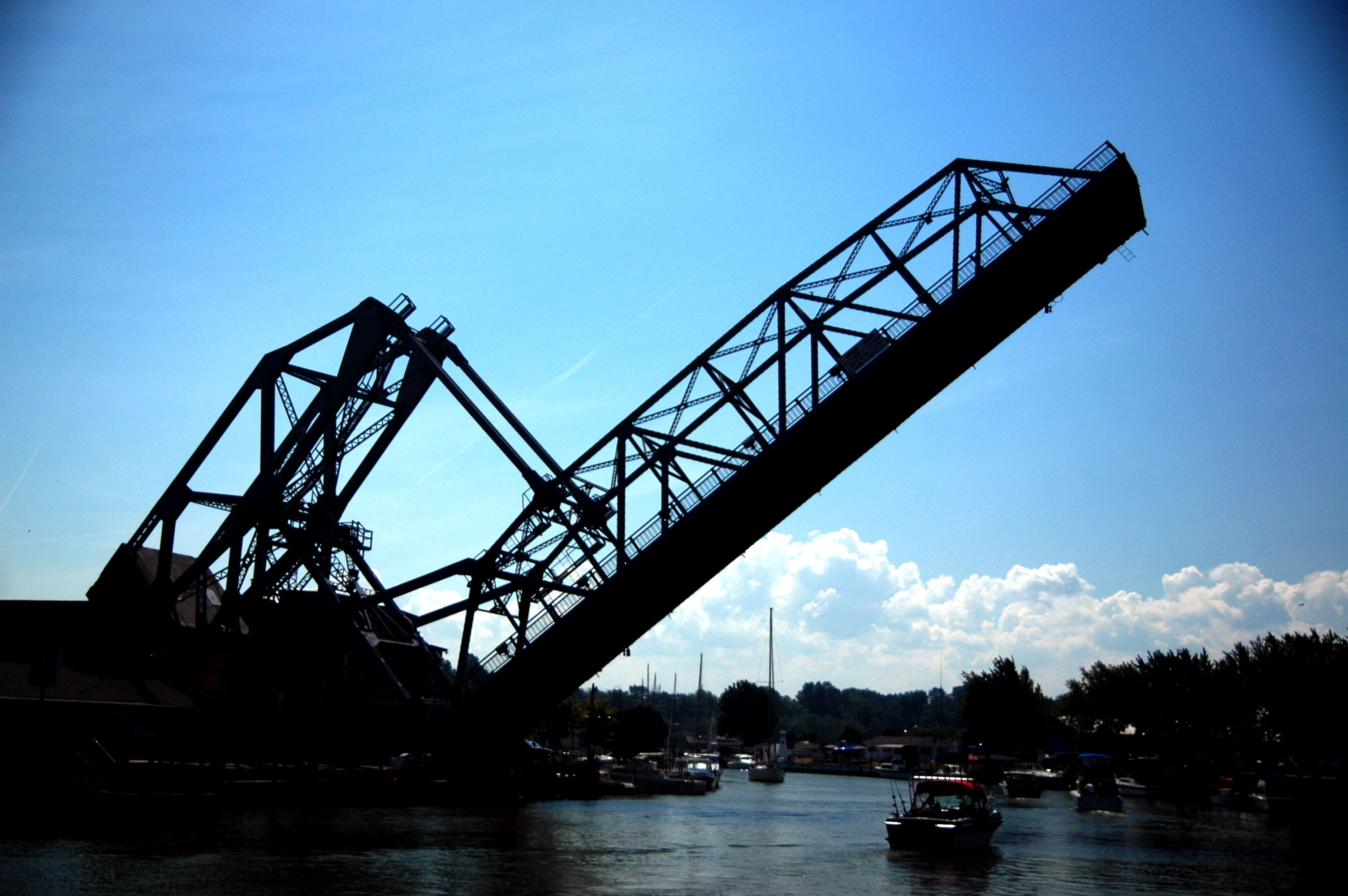
- The Ashtabula lift bridge in raised position

- Location within Ohio Location within the United States
- Location: SR 531 over Ashtabula River, Ashtabula, Ohio
- Coordinates: 41°54′1″N 80°47′53″W
- Area: less than 1 acre (0.40 ha; 4,000 m^{2})
- Built: 1925
- Architect: Kell-Atkinson Const.
- Architectural style: Single leaf bascule
- NRHP reference No.: 85001801
- Added to NRHP: August 23, 1985

The Ashtabula lift bridge (also known as the West Fifth Street bridge) is a Strauss bascule bridge that carries Ohio State Route 531 over the Ashtabula River in the harbor of Ashtabula, Ohio.

Besides its importance as a major transportation route in Ashtabula, the bridge occupies a crucial location in the city's built environment; the Ashtabula Harbour Commercial District terminates at the bridge's western end.

== History ==
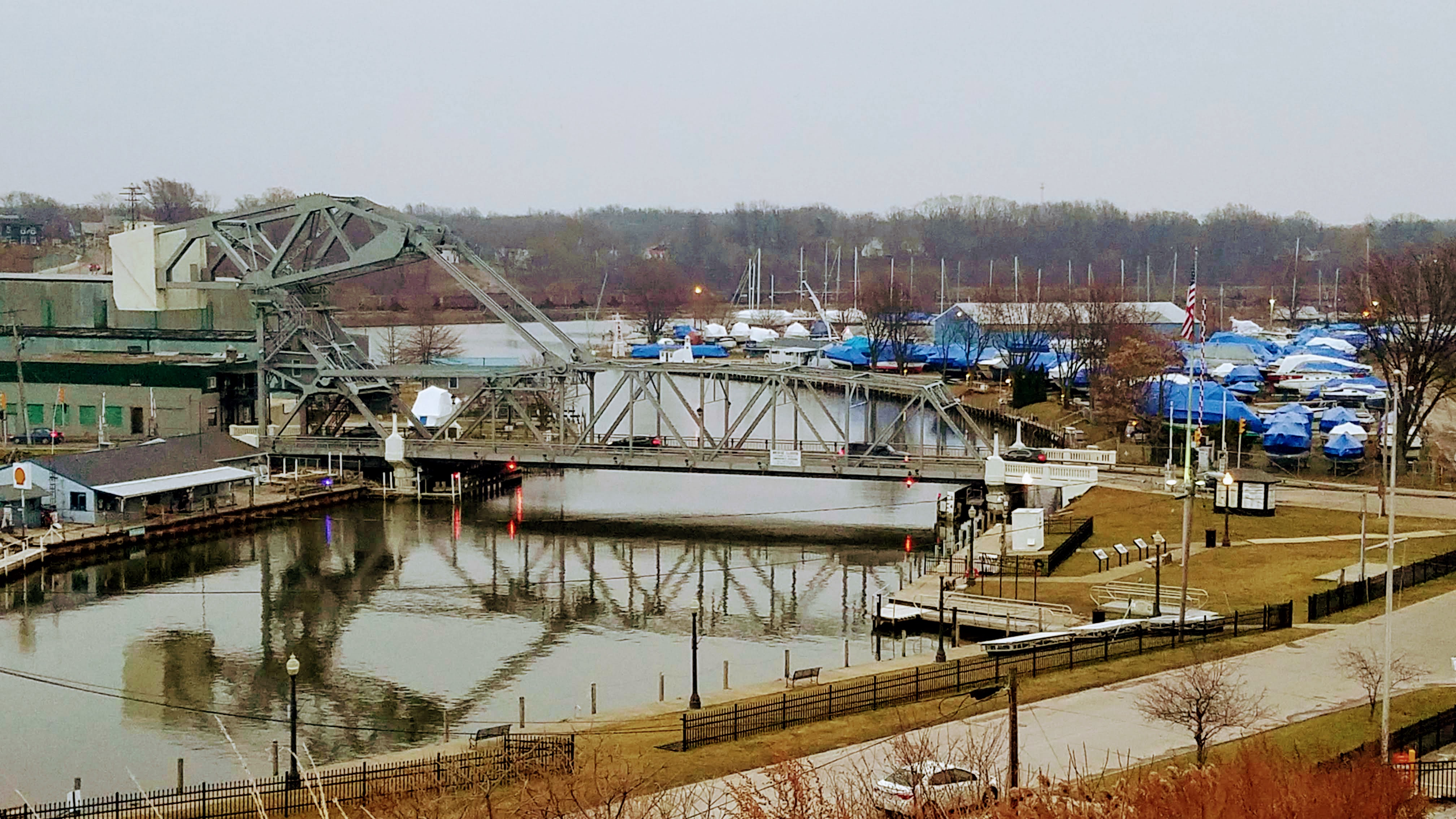
West Fifth Street Bridge as viewed from Point Park, 2019

A river crossing had been at the bridge's site long before it was constructed.

In 1889, a 19th-century pontoon bridge on the site was replaced by a through truss bridge, which permitted river access because it was a swing bridge.

In 1925, the bridge was constructed by a Cleveland firm, Wendell P. Brown, for $179,000. The lifting action depends on electric motors and a massive concrete counterweight. It is one of only two of its type that remain in service in the state of Ohio, and the only one extant in the state highway system.

In 1985, the bridge was listed on the National Register of Historic Places.

In 1986, the bridge was restored.

From March 2008 through May 2009, the bridge was closed for repairs and repainting.

== See also ==
- The Charles Berry Bridge, another bascule bridge in Ohio
