= Ohio State Route 88 =

State highway in northeastern Ohio, US

State Route 88

Route information
- Maintained by ODOT
- Length: 48.24 mi (77.63 km)
- Existed: 1923–present

Major junctions
- South end: SR 59 in Ravenna
- US 422 in Parkman; SR 7 in Vernon Township
- East end: PA 358 in Vernon Township

Location
- Country: United States
- State: Ohio
- Counties: Portage, Geauga, Trumbull

Highway system
- Ohio State Highway System; Interstate; US; State; Scenic
← SR 87	→ SR 89

State Route 88 (SR 88) is a highway generally running in an east–west direction in the northeastern portion of the U.S. state of Ohio. Its southern terminus is in Portage County at SR 59 at the intersection of Freedom Street with Main Street in Ravenna. SR 88 is labeled north-south southwest of U.S. Route 422 (US 422) and SR 168/SR 528, and labeled east-west east of there. SR follows a northerly direction for a little more than one mile (1.6 km) along Freedom Street, to the SR 14 and SR 44 concurrency bypass. From here, the route heads in a northeasterly direction. Its next intersection is with SR 700, at the southern terminus of the latter route. One-quarter mile (0.40 km) further to the northeast, SR 88 joins SR 303 for about one-half mile (0.80 km). SR 88 then continues northeast, crossing over Interstate 80 and the Ohio Turnpike, before turning due north as it enters Garrettsville. Here, as South Street, the route intersects SR 82 (State Street and Main Street), then becomes North Street before exiting the corporation limits.

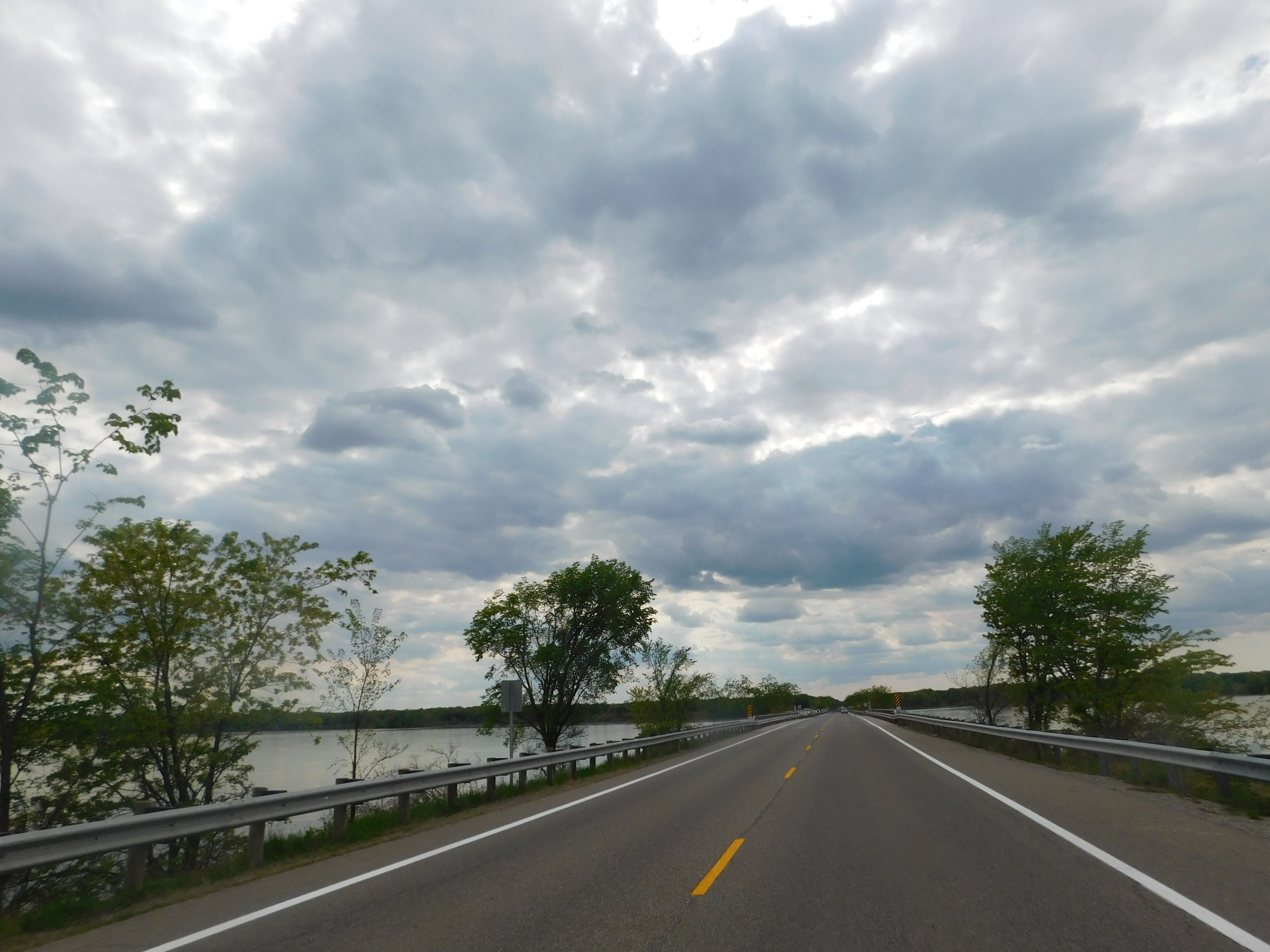
SR 88 crossing Mosquito Creek Lake

The route continues northward, entering Geauga County, becoming McCall Road here, and intersects US 422 in Parkman; this is also the southern termini of State Routes 168 and 528, which overlap SR 88 (first as Main Street, and then Madison Road). About 1 mile (1.6 km) north of Parkman, SR 88 leaves the concurrency and continues due east as Nash Road, and then becomes Greenville Road in Trumbull County.

The route passes through West Farmington as Main Street, then continues as Greenville Road, intersecting SR 534, SR 45 at Bristolville, and SR 46. SR 88 crosses over SR 11 before joining with SR 5 (Warren-Meadville Road), which enters from the southwest about 1/2 mile (0.80 km) before they intersect SR 193 (Youngstown-Kingsville Road). About 1 1/2 miles (2.4 km) later, SR 88 leaves the concurrency and continues east as Greenville Road to its last intersection at SR 7 in Vernon before its eastern terminus at the Pennsylvania state line, where Pennsylvania Route 358 (Vernon Road) continues east.

== History ==
SR 88 was commissioned in 1923, on its current alignment between Garrettsville and Parkman. In 1927 the route was extended east to the Pennsylvania state line. The highway between Ravenna and SR 7 was paved in 1928. The section of road between SR 7 and the Pennsylvania state line was paved in 1933.

== Major intersections ==
County	Location	mi	km	Destinations	Notes
Portage	Ravenna	0.00	0.00	SR 59 (East Main Street) / South Freedom Street – Kent, Warren	Southern terminus of SR 88
Portage	Ravenna	1.26	2.03	SR 14 / SR 44 – Salem, Streetsboro	
Portage	Freedom Township	7.18	11.56	SR 700 north / Freedom Road – Hiram College	Southern terminus of SR 700
Portage	Freedom Township	7.42	11.94	SR 303 west – Streetsboro	South end of SR 303 concurrency
Portage	Freedom Township	7.95	12.79	SR 303 east – Windham	North end of SR 303 concurrency
Portage	Garrettsville	12.00	19.31	SR 82 (Main Street / State Street)	
Portage	Nelson Township	13.70	22.05	SR 305 – Hiram	
Geauga	Parkman	18.50	29.77	US 422 (Main Market Road) / SR 168 begins / SR 528 begins	Southern terminus of SR 168 and SR 528; transition of SR 88 from north to east and from west to south
Geauga	Parkman Township	18.71	30.11	SR 168 north	Northern end of SR 168 concurrency
Geauga	Parkman Township	19.79	31.85	SR 528 north (Madison Road) – Middlefield	Northern end of SR 528 concurrency
Trumbull	Farmington Township	25.31	40.73	SR 534 (Phelps Creek Road) – Geneva	
Trumbull	Bristol Township	29.79	47.94	SR 45 – Orwell, Warren	
Trumbull	Mecca Township	36.71– 36.77	59.08– 59.18	SR 46 – Cortland, Jefferson	Traffic circle
Trumbull	Johnston Township	40.21	64.71	SR 5 west (Warren Road) – Cortland, Warren	West end of SR 5 concurrency
Trumbull	Johnston Township	40.46	65.11	SR 193	
Trumbull	Johnston Township	41.87	67.38	SR 5 east – Kinsman	East end of SR 5 concurrency
Trumbull	Vernon Township	45.52	73.26	SR 7 – Youngstown, Kinsman	
Trumbull	Vernon Township	48.24	77.63	PA 358 east – Greenville	Eastern terminus of SR 88 at Pennsylvania state line
1.000 mi = 1.609 km; 1.000 km = 0.621 mi: Concurrency terminus
