= Ohio State Route 168 =

State highway in Geauga County, Ohio, US

State Route 168

Route information
- Maintained by ODOT
- Length: 8.45 mi (13.60 km)
- Existed: 1924–present

Major junctions
- South end: US 422 / SR 88 / SR 528 near Middlefield
- North end: SR 87 / SR 700 in Burton

Location
- Country: United States
- State: Ohio
- Counties: Geauga

Highway system
- Ohio State Highway System; Interstate; US; State; Scenic
← SR 167	→ SR 169

State Route 168 (SR 168) is north–south state highway in the northeastern portion of the U.S. state of Ohio. The southern terminus of State Route 168, which doubles as the southern endpoint of State Route 528, is along State Route 88 at a signalized intersection with U.S. Route 422 in the hamlet of Parkman. State Route 168's northern terminus, which is concurrently the northern endpoint of State Route 700, is at the junction with State Route 87 at a traffic circle in Burton.

== Route description ==
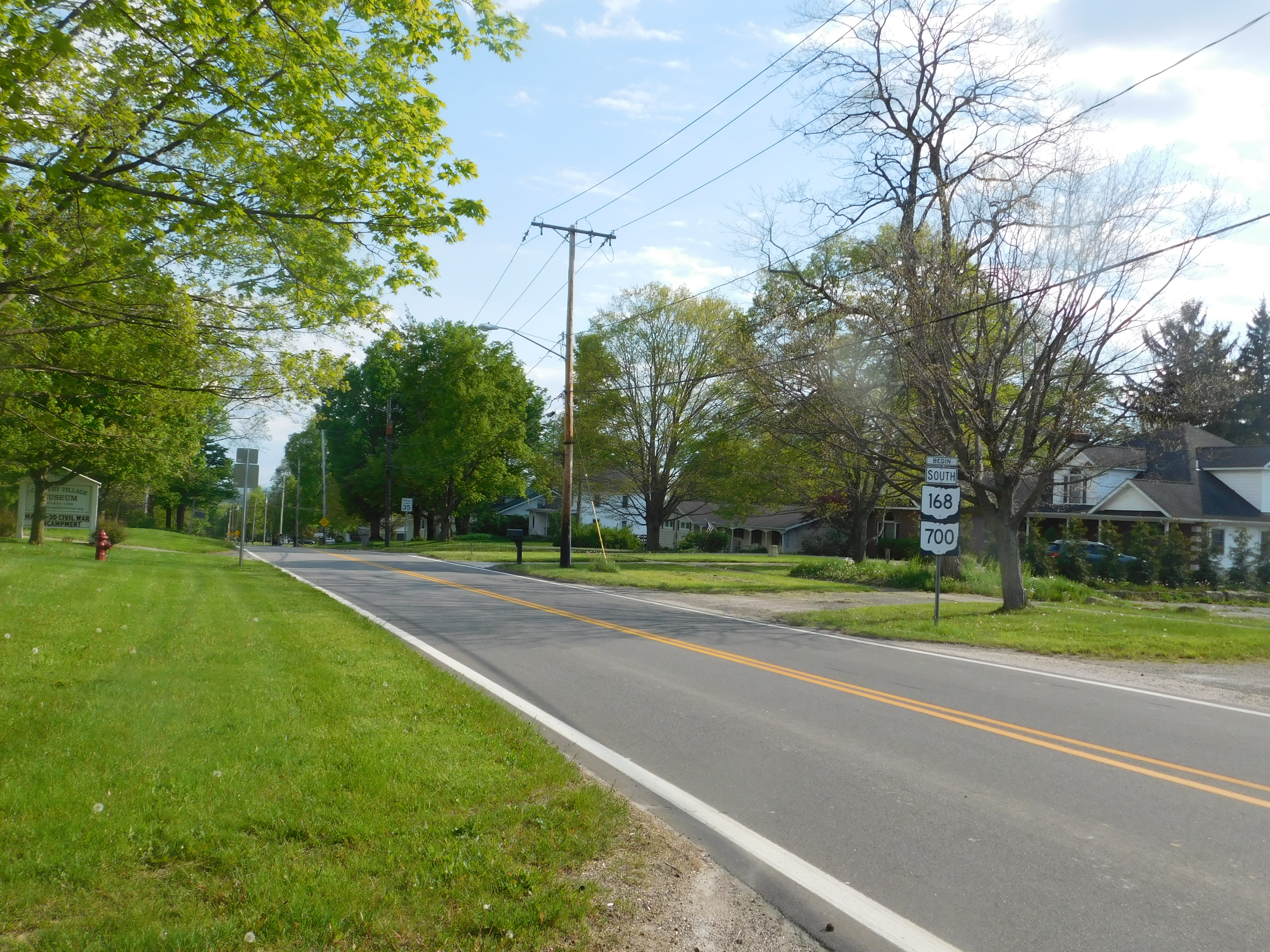
SR 168 and SR 700 in Burton, south from SR 87

The route spans approximately 8.45 miles (13.60 km) and is entirely situated within Geauga County.

The southern terminus of SR 168 is at a signalized intersection with U.S. Route 422, State Route 88, and State Route 528 in the hamlet of Parkman. The northern terminus is at a traffic circle with State Route 87 and State Route 700 in the village of Burton.

SR 168 is not part of the National Highway System, which means it is not considered critical to the nation's economy, mobility, or defense. The route primarily serves local traffic within Geauga County.

== History ==
As it appeared when it was first designated in 1924, State Route 168 followed what is currently the portion of State Route 87 between State Route 168's current northern terminus in Burton and the State Route 45 in the unincorporated community of North Bloomfield, while State Route 87 was routed along the entirety of the current State Route 168 from Burton to Parkman. Three years later, State Route 87 and State Route 168 swapped alignments, with State Route 87 being re-routed onto its current alignment east of Burton, and the State Route 168 designation being applied to its current routing.

== Major intersections ==
The entire route is in Geauga County.

Location	mi	km	Destinations	Notes
Parkman Township	0.00	0.00	US 422 (Main Market Road) / SR 88 west (Nelson Road) / SR 528	Southern end of SR 88/SR 528 concurrency; southern terminus of SR 528
Parkman Township	0.21	0.34	SR 88 east / SR 528 north (Main Street)	Northern end of SR 88/SR 528 concurrency
Burton Township	7.39	11.89	SR 700 south (Claridon-Troy Road)	Southern end of SR 700 concurrency
Burton	8.45	13.60	SR 87 (Park Avenue) / SR 700	Northern end of SR 700 concurrency and northern terminus
1.000 mi = 1.609 km; 1.000 km = 0.621 mi: Concurrency terminus
