= Ohio State Route 174 =

State highway in northeastern Ohio, US

State Route 174

Route information
- Maintained by ODOT
- Length: 9.56 mi (15.39 km)
- Existed: 1923–present

Major junctions
- South end: Old Mill Rd in Gates Mills
- US 322 in Gates Mills; US 6 in Willoughby Hills
- North end: US 20 / SR 640 in Willoughby

Location
- Country: United States
- State: Ohio
- Counties: Cuyahoga, Lake

Highway system
- Ohio State Highway System; Interstate; US; State; Scenic
← SR 173	→ SR 175

State Route 174 (SR 174) is a 9.56-mile (15.39 km) long north–south state highway in the northeastern quadrant of the U.S. state of Ohio. The highway runs from its southern terminus at a T-intersection with Old Mill Road in a quiet residential neighborhood in the eastern Cleveland suburb of Gates Mills to its northern terminus at a signalized intersection with U.S. Route 20 (US 20) in Willoughby that doubles as the eastern terminus of SR 640.

== Route description ==
The routing of SR 174 takes it through eastern Cuyahoga County and western Lake County. No portion of SR 174 is included within the National Highway System (NHS). The NHS is a network of routes determined to be most important for the economy, mobility, and defense of the country. SR 174 northern terminus and concurrency with US 20 has been unsigned since the early 1960s.

== History ==
When SR 174 was established in 1923, it consisted of the following routing: Starting from its southern terminus at SR 91 in Solon, it followed what is now Solon Road northeasterly into Chagrin Falls. It then ran northwest along what is now Chagrin Boulevard, formerly designated as US 422 and, before that, SR 16, to Chagrin River Road. From there, SR 174 utilized Chagrin River Road heading north into Gates Mills, where it tied into its present-day southern terminus, and then followed the entirety of its current routing to its northern terminus in downtown Willoughby.

In 1929, SR 174 took on its present shape when all of the highway south of Gates Mills was removed from the state highway system. Its new (and present) southern terminus was at US 322, which followed Old Mill Road at the time. Even though US 322 was re-routed to the north within Gates Mills in 1940, SR 174 continues to end at Old Mill Road to this day.

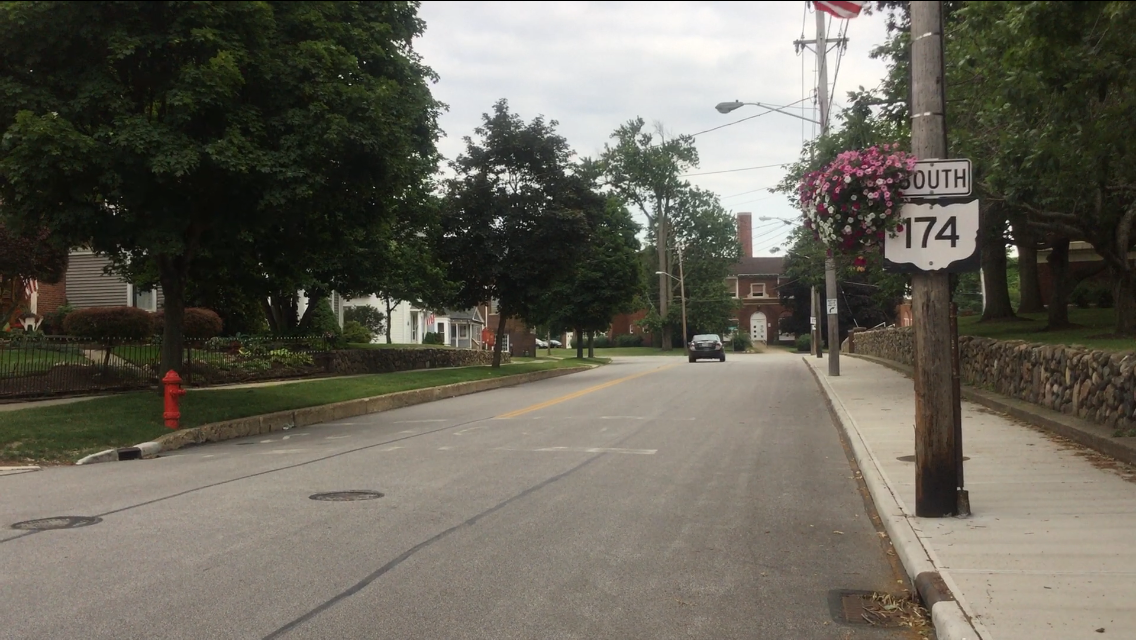
OH 174's "northern terminus" in Willoughby.

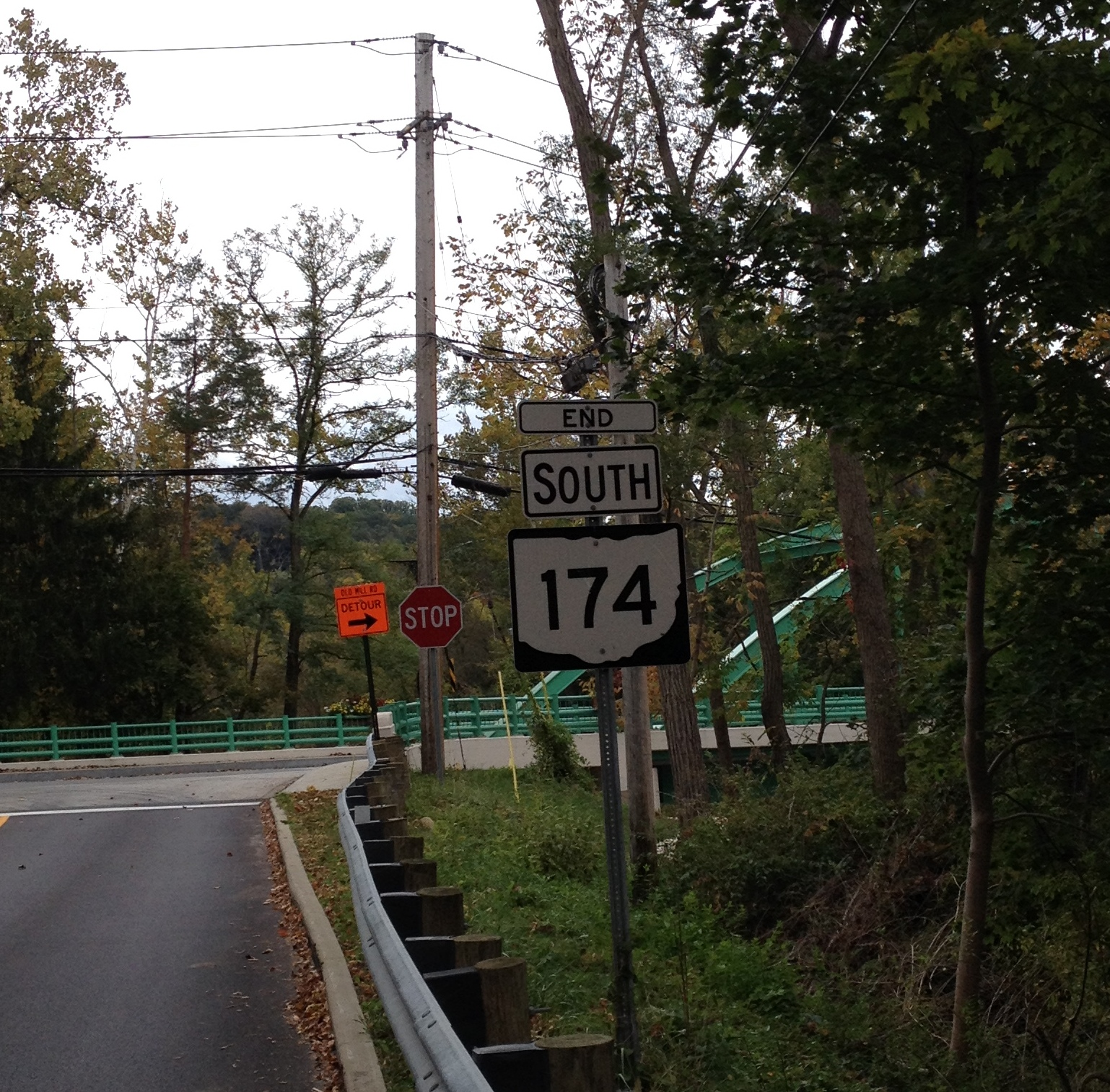
OH 174's southern terminus in Gates Mills.

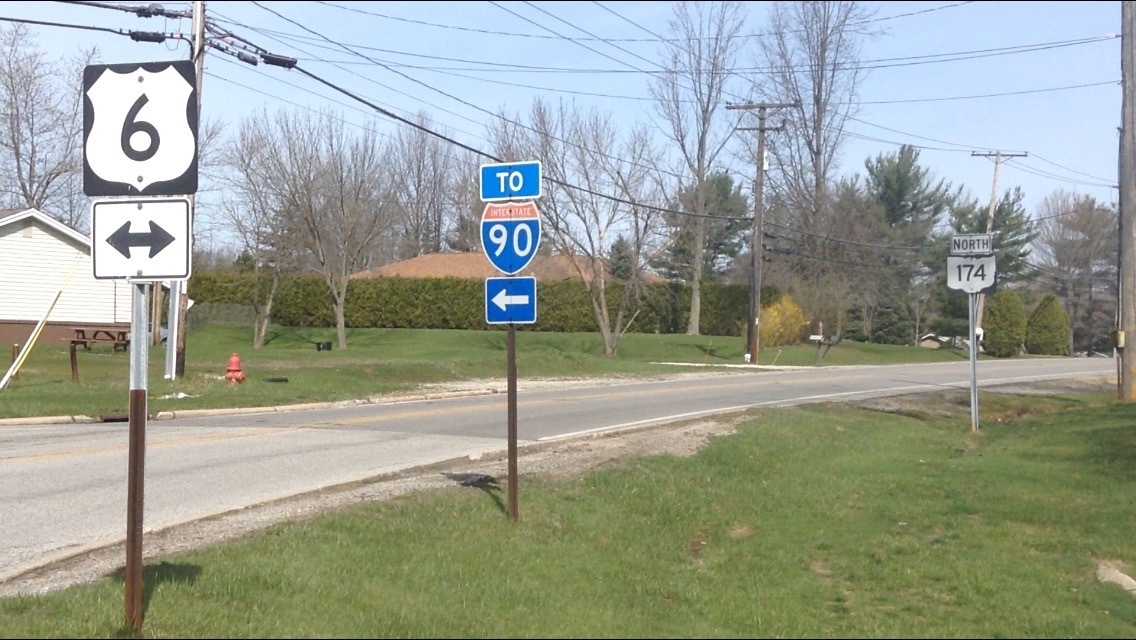
State Route 174 at US 6 in Willoughby Hills, Lake County

== Major intersections ==
County	Location	mi	km	Destinations	Notes
Cuyahoga	Gates Mills	0.00	0.00	Old Mill Road	-
Cuyahoga	Gates Mills	0.91	1.46	US 322 (Mayfield Road)	
Lake	Willoughby Hills	5.37	8.64	US 6 (Chardon Road) to I-90	
Lake	Willoughby	7.87	12.67	SR 84 west (Ridge Road) / Willoughcroft Road	Southern end of SR 84 concurrency
Lake	Willoughby	8.21	13.21	SR 84 east (Johnnycake Ridge Road) / Oakdale Road	Northern end of SR 84 concurrency
Lake	Willoughby	9.36	15.06	US 20 west (Euclid Avenue) / Spaulding Avenue	Southern end of US 20 concurrency
Lake	Willoughby	9.56	15.39	US 20 east (Mentor Avenue) / SR 640 west (Vine Street) / Erie Street	Northern end of US 20 concurrency; eastern terminus of SR 640
1.000 mi = 1.609 km; 1.000 km = 0.621 mi: Concurrency terminus
