= Pennsylvania Route 226 =

State highway in Pennsylvania, United States

Pennsylvania Route 226

Route information
- Maintained by PennDOT
- Length: 4.868 mi (7.834 km)
- Existed: 1961–present

Major junctions
- West end: SR 84 at the Ohio state line near Conneaut, OH
- East end: US 6N in Conneaut Township

Location
- Country: United States
- State: Pennsylvania
- Counties: Erie

Highway system
- Pennsylvania State Route System; Interstate; US; State; Scenic; Legislative
← PA 225	→ PA 227

Pennsylvania Route 226 (PA 226) is a 4.868-mile-long (7.834 km) state highway located in Conneaut Township, Erie County, Pennsylvania. The western terminus is at the Ohio state line, where the road continues into that state as State Route 84 (SR 84). The eastern terminus is at U.S. Route 6N (US 6N) west of Albion.

== Route description ==
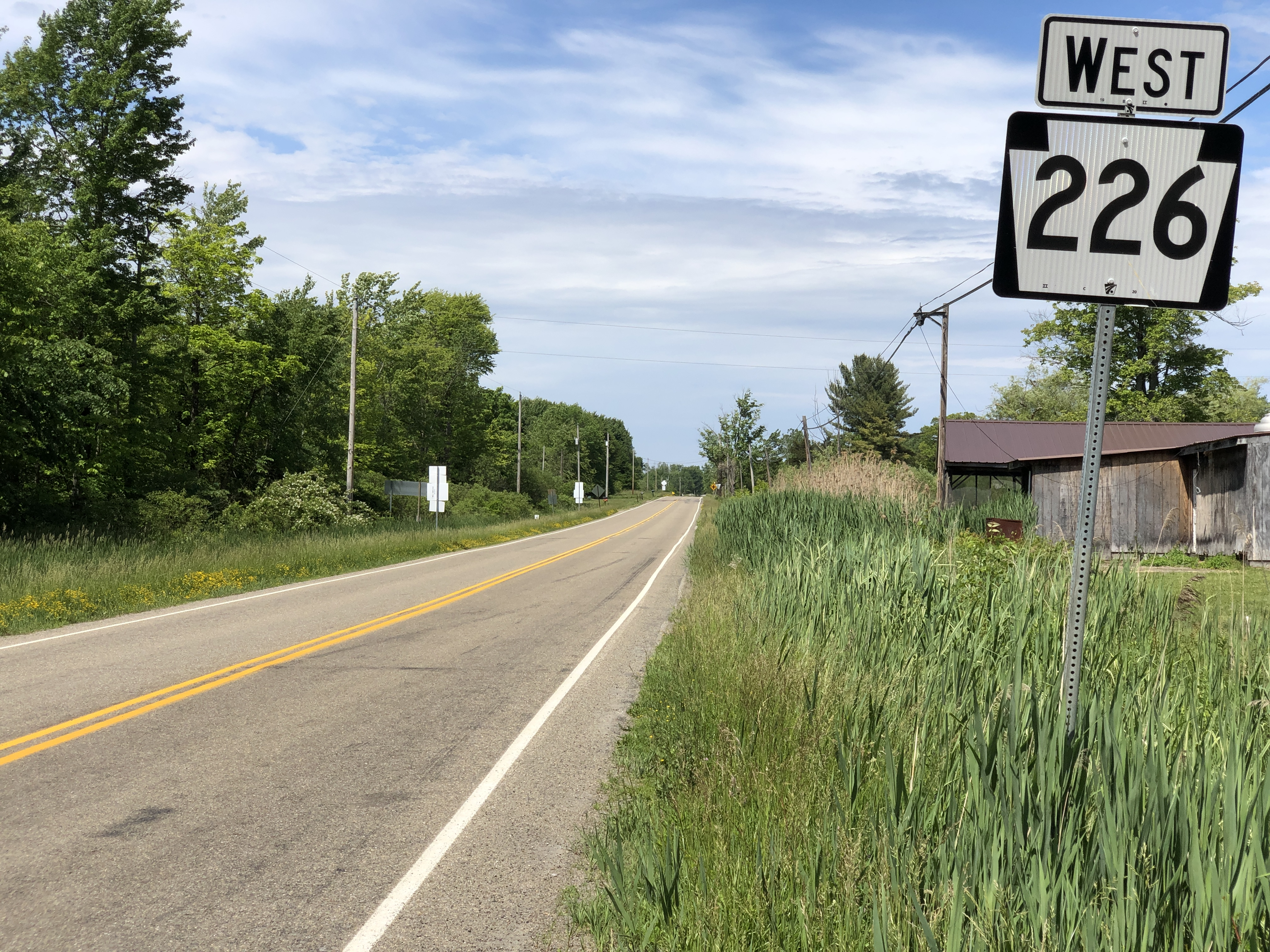
PA 226 westbound past US 6N in Conneaut Township

PA 226 begins at the Ohio border in Conneaut Township in Erie County, where the road continues west into that state as SR 84. From the state line, the route heads northeast on an unnamed two-lane undivided road through forested areas with some farms and homes. The road runs through more rural areas as it passes through Tracy. PA 226 makes a curve to the east as it comes to its eastern terminus at US 6N.

== Major intersections ==
The entire route is in Conneaut Township, Erie County.

mi	km	Destinations	Notes
0.000	0.000	SR 84 west (Bushnell Road)	Western terminus
4.868	7.834	US 6N – Albion, West Springfield	Eastern terminus; village of Tracy
1.000 mi = 1.609 km; 1.000 km = 0.621 mi
