= Parkman, Ohio =

- Census-designated place
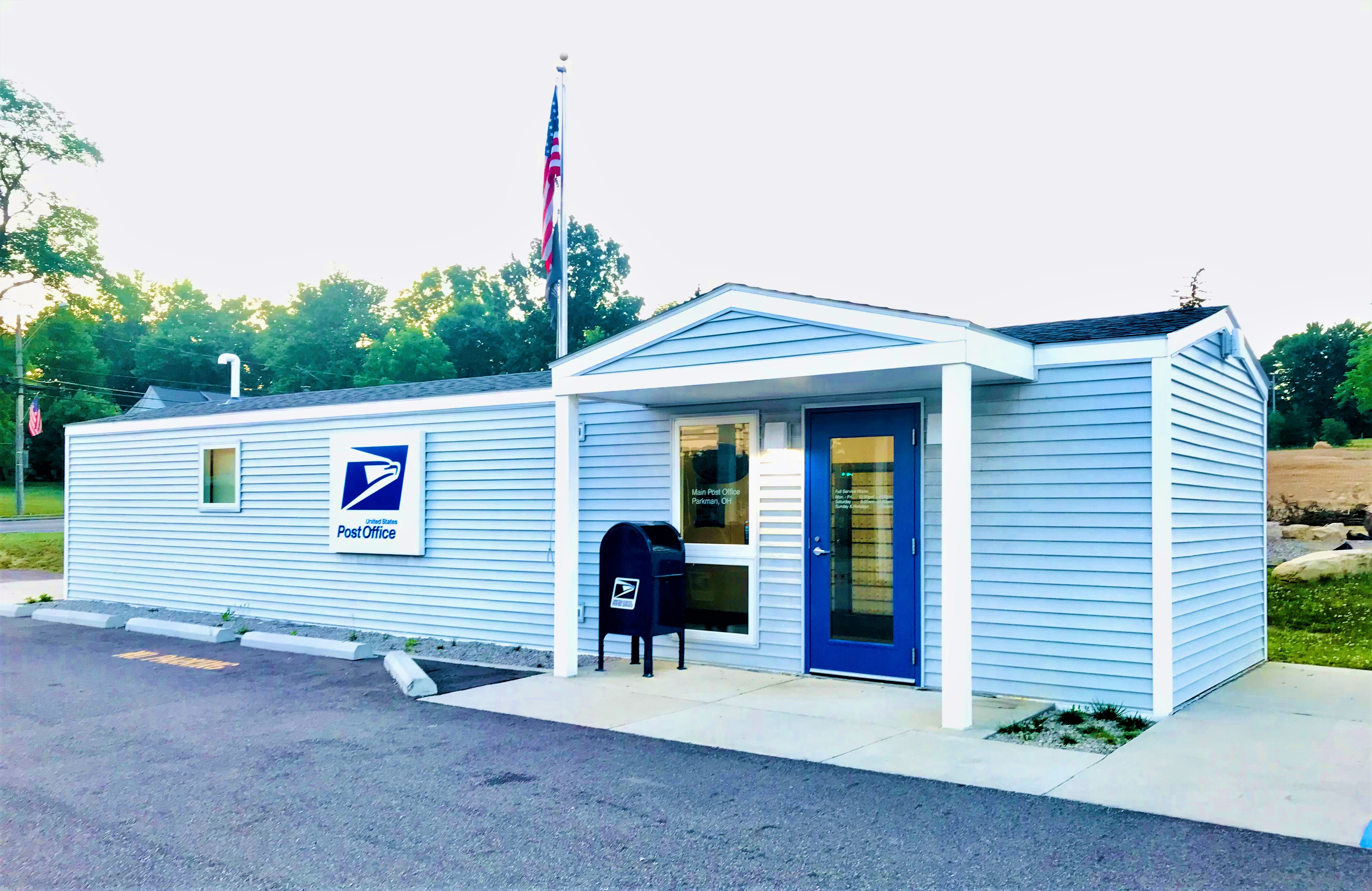
- Parkman Post Office.

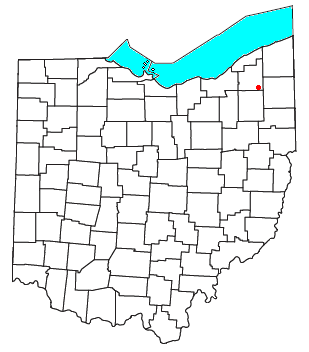
- Location of Parkman, Ohio
- Coordinates: 41°22′25″N 81°03′34″W
- Country: United States
- State: Ohio
- County: Geauga
- Township: Parkman

Area
  - Total: 0.72 sq mi (1.86 km^{2})
  - Land: 0.71 sq mi (1.85 km^{2})
  - Water: 0.0039 sq mi (0.01 km^{2})
- Elevation: 1,112 ft (339 m)

Population (2020)
  - Total: 282
  - Density: 395.1/sq mi (152.55/km^{2})
- Time zone: UTC-5 (Eastern (EST))
  - Summer (DST): UTC-4 (EDT)
- ZIP code: 44080
- FIPS code: 39-59934
- GNIS feature ID: 2628951
- Website: Community website

Parkman is a census-designated place in southern Parkman Township, Geauga County, Ohio, United States. As of the 2020 census, Parkman had a population of 282. It lies along U.S. Route 422 at its intersection with State Routes 88, 168, and 528.

== History ==
Parkman was laid out in 1804. The community has the name of Samuel Parkman, an official with the Connecticut Land Company. A post office called Parkman has been in operation since 1806.

== Demographics ==
Historical population
Census	Pop.	Note	%±
2020	282		—
U.S. Decennial Census

== Notable person ==
- Seth Ledyard Phelps, United States Navy officer, politician, and diplomat
