= Ohio State Route 307 =

State highway in northeastern Ohio, US

State Route 307

Route information
- Maintained by ODOT
- Length: 22.99 mi (37.00 km)
- Existed: 1933–present

Major junctions
- West end: SR 528 on the Madison/Madison Township line
- East end: SR 193 near Jefferson

Location
- Country: United States
- State: Ohio
- Counties: Lake, Ashtabula

Highway system
- Ohio State Highway System; Interstate; US; State; Scenic
← SR 306	→ SR 308

State Route 307 (SR 307) is an east–west state highway in the northeastern portion of the U.S. state of Ohio. Its western terminus is at State Route 528 on the southern boundary of Madison, and its eastern terminus is at State Route 193 nearly 7 miles (11 km) southeast of Jefferson.

SR 307 was commissioned in the mid-1930s and the route was swapped with another state route one year later. The route was extended in the later 1930s, to an intersection with SR 84. That section of road was decommission in the early 1960s.

== Route description ==
SR 307 begins at a T-intersection with SR 528. The route heads east as a two-lane highway passing through farmland and woodland, with some houses. The highway has an intersection with SR 534. The road has an intersection with SR 45, in Austinburg. After Austinburg, SR 307 turns towards the southeast, still passing through farmland and woodland. The route enters Jefferson, passing through residential properties, before an intersection with SR 46. SR 46 and SR 307 head due south concurrent, into downtown Jefferson, passing through commercial and residential properties. After downtown Jefferson SR 307 leaves SR 46. SR 307 heads southeast leaving Jefferson, passing through woodland and farmland. The highway has an interchange with SR 11. SR 307 ends at a T-intersection in rural Ashtabula County. No segment of this highway is a part of the National Highway System.

== History ==
SR 307 was original certified in 1933, it was routed between Madison and SR 45 along current State Route 84. In 1934 SR 307 swapped alignments with SR 84. The route was extended west to SR 84, 4 miles (6.4 km) east of Painesville, in 1937. Between 1962 and 1964, SR 307 between SR 84 and SR 528 was decommissioned.

== Major intersections ==
County	Location	mi	km	Destinations	Notes
Lake	Madison Township	0.00	0.00	SR 528 (South Madison Road)	
Ashtabula	Harpersfield Township	5.54	8.92	SR 534	
Ashtabula	Austinburg Township	10.14	16.32	SR 45 (Center Road)	
Ashtabula	Jefferson	15.10	24.30	SR 46 north / SR 167 east (East Beech Street)	Western end of SR 46 concurrency; western terminus of SR 167
Ashtabula	Jefferson	16.21	26.09	SR 46 south / West Mulberry Street	Eastern end of SR 46 concurrency
Ashtabula	Dorset Township	19.85	31.95	SR 11 – Youngstown, Ashtabula	Interchange
Ashtabula	Dorset Township	22.99	37.00	SR 193 – Dorset, North Kingsville	
1.000 mi = 1.609 km; 1.000 km = 0.621 mi: Concurrency terminus
