= Ohio State Route 86 =

State highway in northeastern Ohio, US

State Route 86

Route information
- Maintained by ODOT
- Length: 21.98 mi (35.37 km)
- Existed: 1923–present

Major junctions
- West end: US 20 in Painesville
- US 6 in Montville
- East end: SR 534 in Windsor

Location
- Country: United States
- State: Ohio
- Counties: Lake, Geauga, Ashtabula

Highway system
- Ohio State Highway System; Interstate; US; State; Scenic
← SR 85	→ SR 87

State Route 86 (SR 86) is an east–west state highway in the northeastern portion of the U.S. state of Ohio. Its western terminus is at US 20 in Painesville, and its southern terminus is at SR 534 near Windsor.

SR 86 does not have an interchange with Interstate 90 but motorists can access I-90's Exit 205 in LeRoy Township via Vrooman Road, a county road.

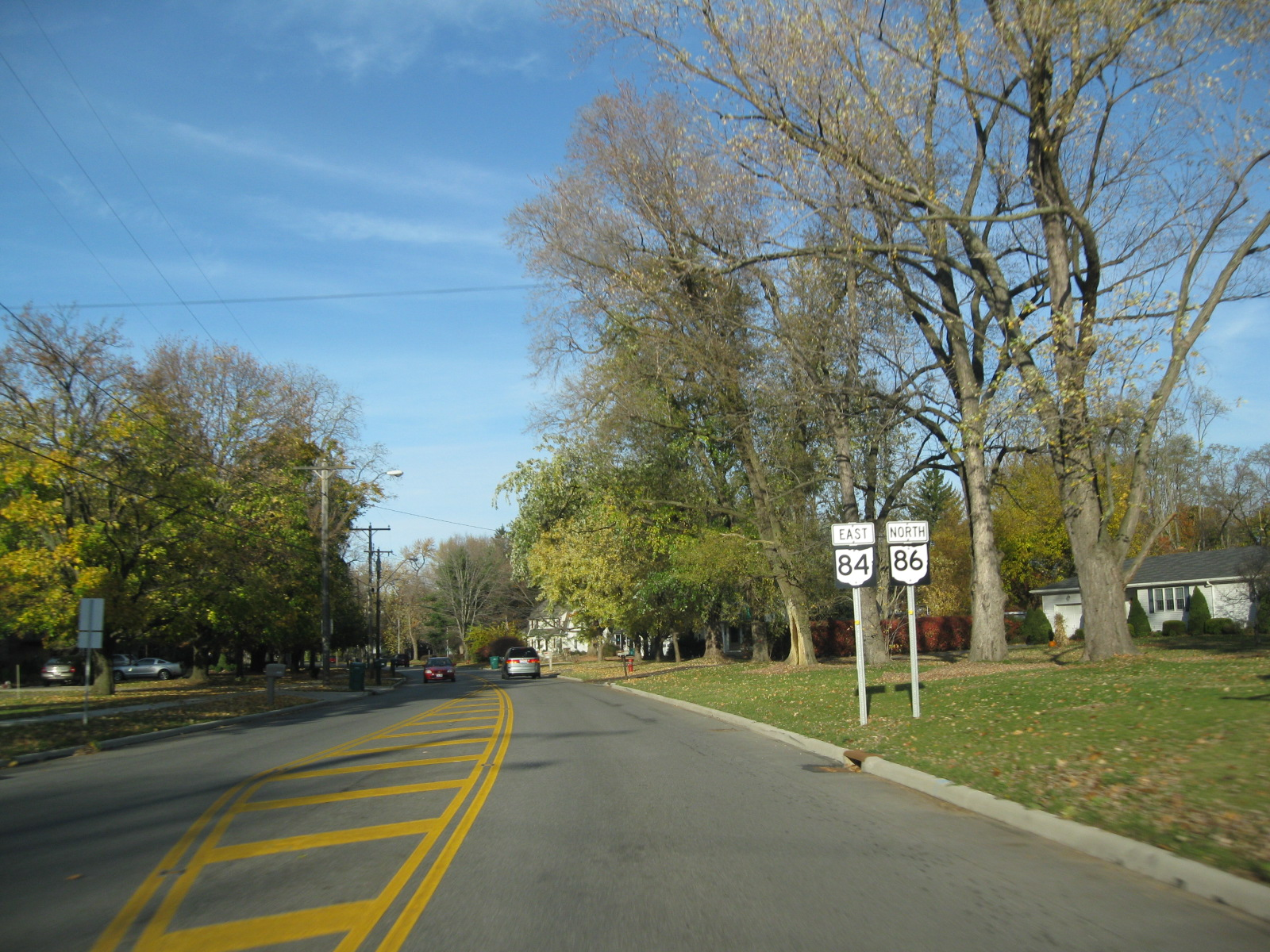
Ohio State Route 86 concurrency with SR 84; The "NORTH" sign has since been replaced with a "WEST" sign

A significant section of SR 86 was rerouted south of Painesville 2007–2008 in a project proposed since the early 1980s. The southern portion of this section, just north of I-90, was rerouted during the 2007 construction season, and the northern, bypassing a section with a history of slope sliding, in 2008, with the road opening in full on October 31. The SR 84/86 overlap was subsequently extended approximately a half-mile.

Prior to August 17, 2007, SR 86 overlapped with SR 534 from their intersection to US 322 in Windsor. That overlap has since been removed, with that stretch of road becoming solely SR 534.

== History ==
Route 86 was established in 1923 and has had no significant changes since its certification. In 2007, the southern end was truncated at SR 534 northwest of Windsor and in 2008, the near north end overlap with SR 84 was lengthened.

== Major intersections ==
County	Location	mi	km	Destinations	Notes
Lake	Painesville	0.00	0.00	US 20 / LECT (East Erie Street) / North State Street	
Lake	Painesville	0.84	1.35	SR 84 east (East Walnut Avenue)	Western end of SR 84 concurrency
Lake	Painesville	1.64	2.64	SR 84 west (Bank Street)	Eastern end of SR 84 concurrency
Geauga	Thompson Township	10.97	17.65	SR 166 (Rock Creek Road)	
Geauga	Montville Township	14.38	23.14	US 6	
Geauga	Montville Township	15.42	24.82	SR 528 (Madison Road)	
Ashtabula	Windsor Township	21.98	35.37	SR 534 (Painesville-Warren Road)	
1.000 mi = 1.609 km; 1.000 km = 0.621 mi: Concurrency terminus
