= Ohio State Route 531 =

State highway in Ashtabula County, Ohio, US

State Route 531
- Lake Road

Route information
- Maintained by ODOT
- Length: 22.72 mi (36.56 km)
- Existed: 1937–present
- Tourist routes: LECT

Major junctions
- West end: SR 534 in Geneva-on-the-Lake
- SR 11 in Ashtabula
- East end: SR 7 in Conneaut

Location
- Country: United States
- State: Ohio
- Counties: Ashtabula

Highway system
- Ohio State Highway System; Interstate; US; State; Scenic
← SR 530	→ SR 532

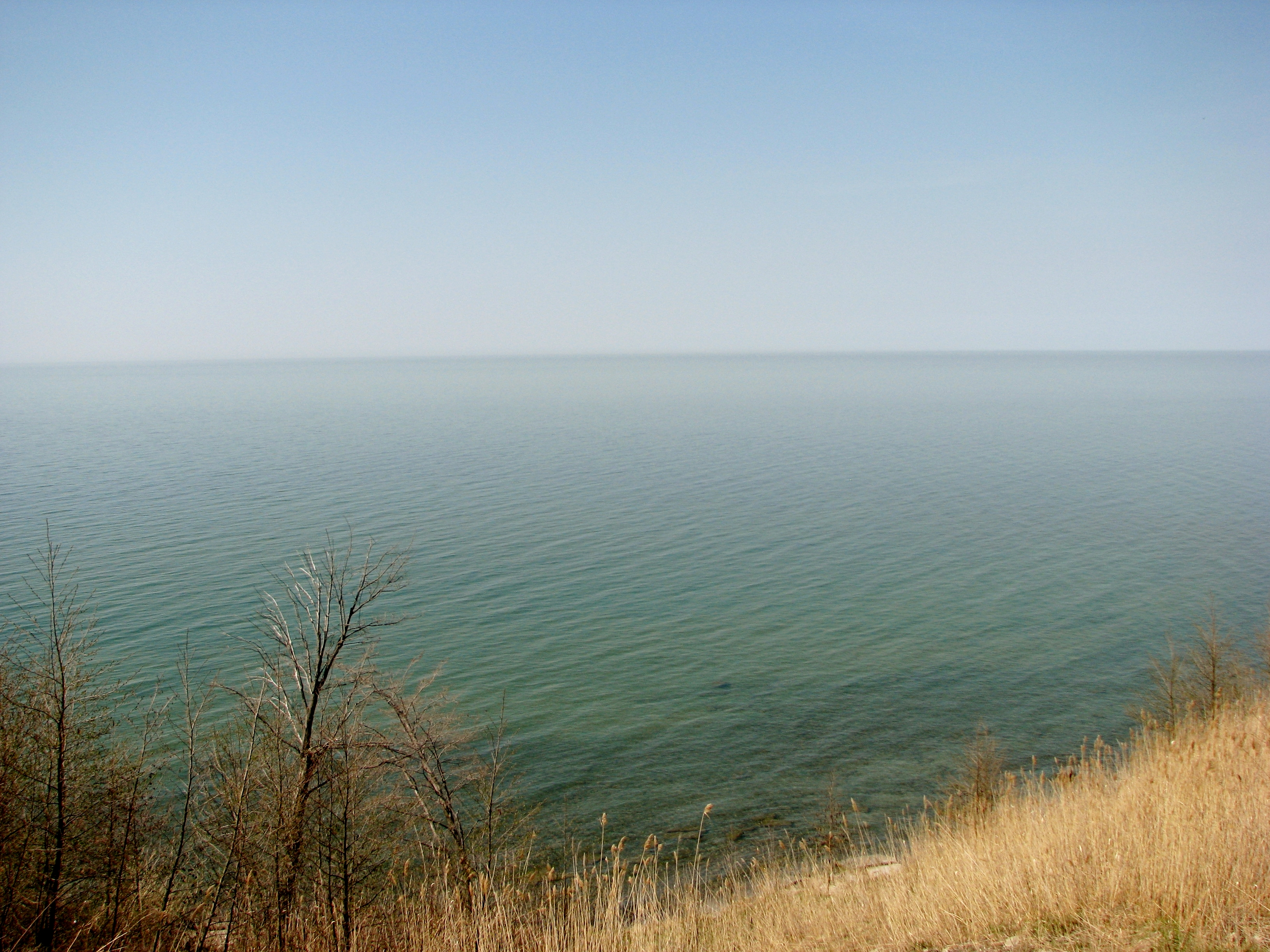
Lake Erie view from Ohio State Route 531.

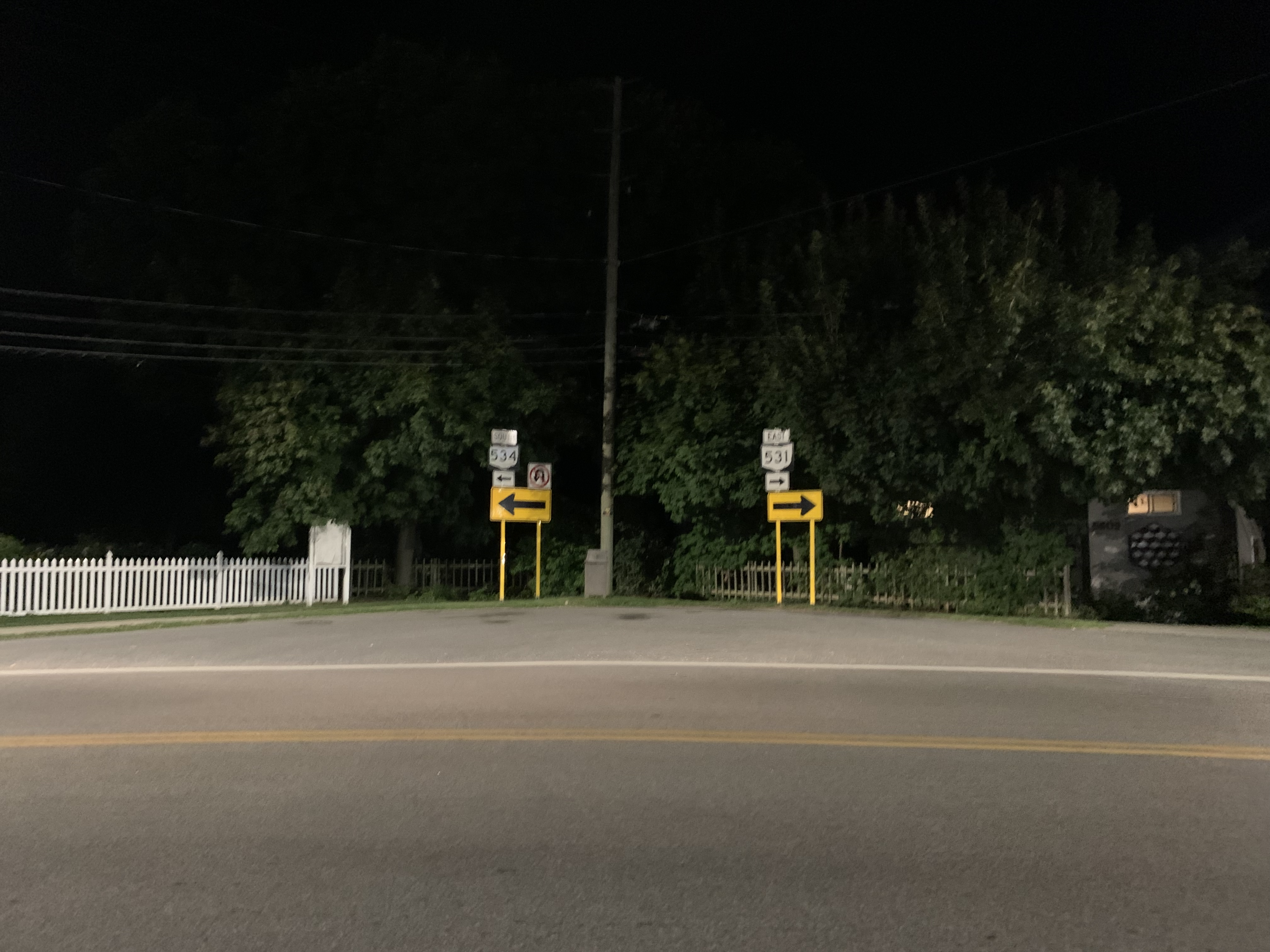
Ohio State Route 531 and Ohio State Route 534 in Geneva-on-the-Lake

State Route 531 (SR 531) is an east–west state highway in the U.S. state of Ohio. The western terminus of State Route 531 is at the northern terminus of State Route 534 in Geneva-on-the-Lake, at a curve along Lake Road. The route's eastern terminus is at the northern terminus of State Route 7, at a signalized intersection in Conneaut.

Following mostly along the Lake Erie shoreline, it is named Lake Road for most of its length. Due to its proximity to the shoreline, sections west of Ashtabula have had to be re-routed as a result of lake erosion. The route crosses the Ashtabula River in Ashtabula via a Strauss bascule bridge, the Ashtabula lift bridge.

== Route description ==
The entirety of State Route 531 is situated in the northern portion of Ashtabula County. No portion of State Route 531 is included within the National Highway System.

== History ==
State Route 531 made its debut in 1937 along the routing that it currently utilizes between State Route 534 and State Route 7. It has not experienced any major changes since it was established. SR 531 is currently receiving slope erosion repairs, starting from Myers Road to Nineveh Road. The project started in May 2013, and is expected to finished in September 2014.

== Major intersections ==
The entire route is in Ashtabula County.

Location	mi	km	Destinations	Notes
Geneva-on-the-Lake	0.00	0.00	SR 534 south (North Broadway) / LECT	Western terminus that doubles as the northern terminus of SR 534
Saybrook Township	5.57	8.96	SR 45 south (Center Road) – Rock Creek	Northern terminus of SR 45
Ashtabula	9.14– 9.20	14.71– 14.81	Ashtabula lift bridge	
Ashtabula	10.02	16.13	SR 11 south to I-90 – Youngstown	Northern terminus of SR 11
North Kingsville	14.75	23.74	SR 193 south (North Main Street) to I-90	Northern terminus of SR 193
Conneaut	22.72	36.56	SR 7 south (Broad Street) / Lake Road / LECT	Eastern terminus that doubles as the northern terminus of SR 7
1.000 mi = 1.609 km; 1.000 km = 0.621 mi
