= Geneva High School (Ohio) =

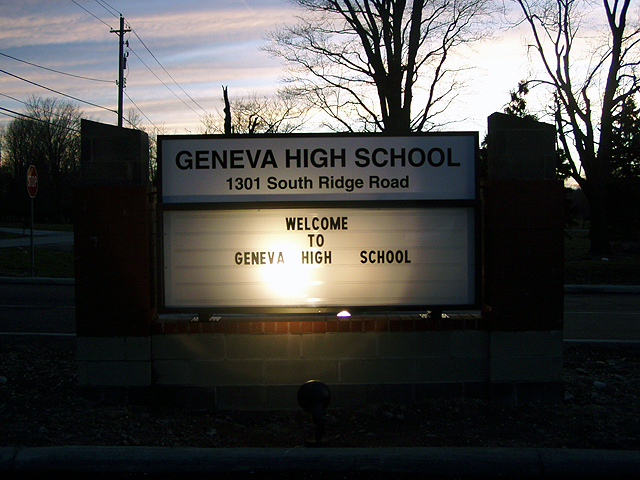
- Sign located in front of the high school

Location
- 1301 South Ridge Road East; Geneva, (Ashtabula County), Ohio 44041; United States
- Coordinates: 41°48′1″N 80°55′41″W

Information
- Type: Public, Coeducation
- Established: 1959
- School district: Geneva Area City School District
- Superintendent: Paul Lombardo
- Principal: Michael King
- Teaching staff: 33.12 (FTE)
- Grades: 9-12
- Enrollment: 649 (2023–2024)
- Student to teacher ratio: 19.60
- Colors: Scarlet and Gray
- Athletics conference: Chagrin Valley Conference
- Team name: Eagles
- Accreditation: North Central Association of Colleges and Schools
- Yearbook: Aquila
- Website: School HomePage

Geneva High School is a public high school located in Geneva, Ohio. It is the only high school in the Geneva Area School District. Athletic Team are known as the Eagles and they compete as a member of the Ohio High School Athletic Association in the Chagrin Valley Conference.

== History ==
Opened in 1960, Geneva High School serves students grades 9-12.

Geneva High School was formed, following the consolidation of The East Geneva School District consolidated with the Geneva Area School District in 1959.

In 1957, a brand-new high school was opened, and the original Geneva High School became Geneva Junior High School. The new school was named Geneva High School.

In 1970, an addition was made onto the new high school, allowing the building to serve students in grades 7-12. Geneva Junior High School was renamed Geneva Elementary School to serve students in grades K-6 and Spencer School became an elementary school, also to serve students in grades K-6. The high school was renamed to Geneva Junior High School and began serving students in grades seven and eight.

In 2002 a levy was passed to build a new high school to house the 9-12 students, Geneva High School current campus was completed and opened in 2006.

== Athletics ==
Geneva High School currently offers:

- Baseball
- Basketball
- Cheerleading
- Cross Country
- Golf
- Football
- Soccer
- Softball
- Swimming
- Tennis
- Track and field
- Volleyball
- Wrestling

== Notable alumni ==
- Brian Anderson - former professional baseball player in the Major League Baseball (MLB)
