= Ohio State Route 700 =

State highway in northeastern Ohio, US

State Route 700

Route information
- Maintained by ODOT
- Length: 16.71 mi (26.89 km)
- Existed: 1942–present

Major junctions
- South end: SR 88 in Freedom
- US 422 in Welshfield
- North end: SR 87 / SR 168 in Burton

Location
- Country: United States
- State: Ohio
- Counties: Portage, Geauga

Highway system
- Ohio State Highway System; Interstate; US; State; Scenic
← SR 699	→ SR 701

State Route 700 (SR 700) is a 16.71-mile (26.89 km) long north–south state highway in the northeastern portion of the U.S. state of Ohio. The southern terminus of SR 700 is at SR 88 in Freedom Township, about 5 miles (8.0 km) south of Hiram. Its northern terminus is at a traffic circle where it meets SR 87 in Burton, a point that doubles as the northern terminus of SR 168.

== Route description ==
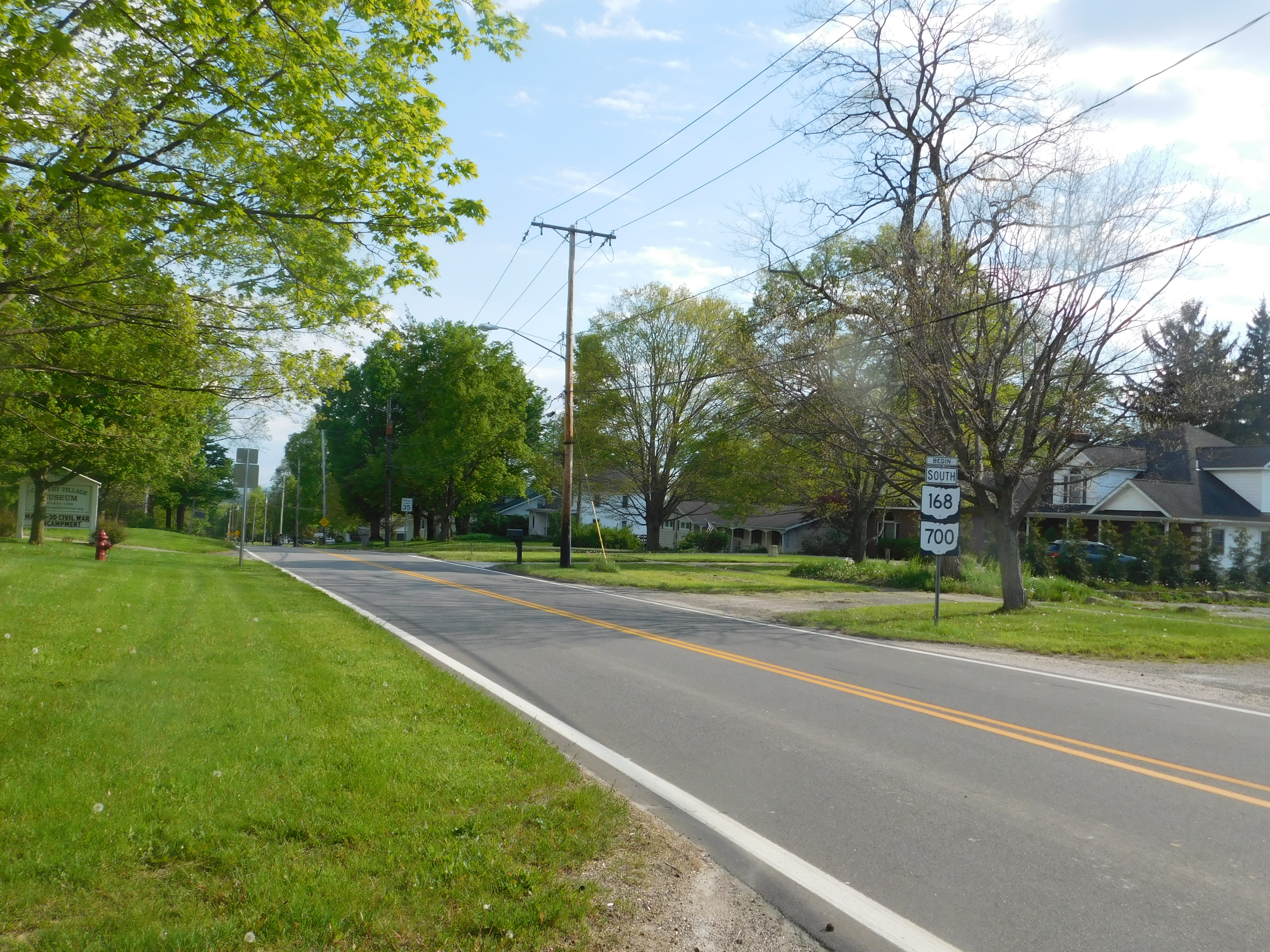
SR 700 and SR 168 in Burton south of SR 87

Along its path, SR 700 passes through northern Portage County and southern Geauga County. No portion of this highway is included within the National Highway System (NHS). The NHS is a network of routes deemed to be most important for the economy, mobility and defense of the nation.

== History ==
The route was originally part of the larger State Route 80, established in 1923. The original northern terminus for SR 80 was at US 422 in Welshfield before being extended north in 1939 to the current northern terminus of SR 700 at State Route 87 in Burton. The SR 700 designation was applied to the current route in 1942 after the section of SR 80 between State Route 88 in Freedom and State Route 14 in Edinburg was decommissioned in 1941 as part of the creation of the Ravenna Army Ammunition Plant. The portion from Edinburg south retained the SR 80 designation until 1962, when it was renumbered as State Route 183. As of 2020, SR 700 follows its original routing through Portage and Geauga Counties and has been paved for its entire lifespan.

== Major intersections ==
County	Location	mi	km	Destinations	Notes
Portage	Freedom Township	0.00	0.00	SR 88 / CR 211 (Freedom Road)	
Portage	Freedom Township	0.19	0.31	SR 303 (Richfield Hudson Road)	
Portage	Hiram Township	4.55	7.32	SR 82 east (Twinsburg Warren Road) – Garrettsville	Southern end of SR 82 concurrency
Portage	Hiram	5.27	8.48	SR 82 west / SR 305 east (Wakefield Road) – Aurora	Northern end of SR 82 concurrency; western terminus of SR 305
Geauga	Troy Township	10.61	17.08	US 422 (Main Market Road)	
Geauga	Burton Township	15.65	25.19	SR 168 south (Tavern Road)	Southern end of SR 168 concurrency
Geauga	Burton	16.71	26.89	SR 87 (Park Avenue) / SR 168 ends	Northern end of SR 168 concurrency; traffic circle
1.000 mi = 1.609 km; 1.000 km = 0.621 mi: Concurrency terminus
