= Geneva Area City School District =

School district in Ohio

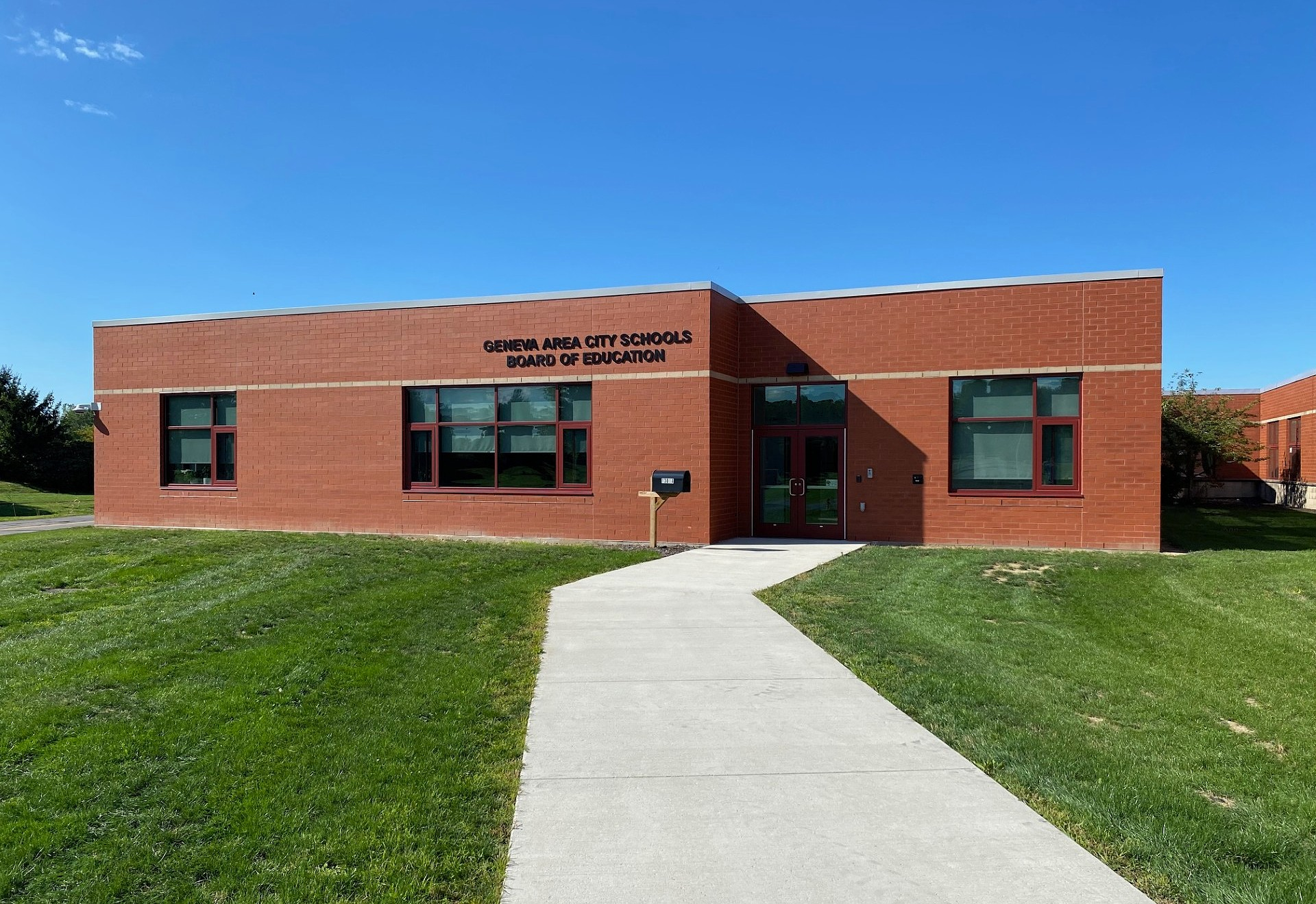

Address
- 1301 S Ridge Rd E Ste A Geneva, Ohio, 44041; United States

District information
- Type: Public
- Grades: PreK–12
- NCES District ID: 3904405

Students and staff
- Students: 1,949 (2024–2025)

Other information
- Website: www.genevaschools.org

Geneva Area City School District is a school district located in Ashtabula County, Ohio. The district serves one high school, one middle school and three elementary schools.

== History ==
The Geneva Area City School District was formed, following the consolidation of The East Geneva School District consolidated with the Geneva Area School District in 1959.

In 1957, a brand-new high school was opened, and the original Geneva High School became Geneva Junior High School. The new school was named Geneva High School.

In 1970, an addition was made onto the new high school, allowing the building to serve students in grades 7-12. Geneva Junior High School was renamed Geneva Elementary School to serve students in grades K-6 and Spencer School became an elementary school, also to serve students in grades K-6. The high school was renamed to Geneva Junior High School and began serving students in grades seven and eight.

In 2002 a levy was passed to build a new high school to house the 9-12 students, Geneva High School current campus was completed and opened in 2006.

== Schools ==
Schools within the district consist of

=== High School ===
- Geneva High School

=== Middle School ===
- Geneva Junior High School

=== Elementary School ===
- Austinburg Elementary School
- Cork Elementary School
- Platt R. Spencer School
