= Peck House =

Peck House may refer to:

in the United States (by state then city)

- Peck House (Empire, Colorado), listed on the National Register of Historic Places (NRHP) in Clear Creek County
- Bill Peck House, Challis, Idaho, listed on the NRHP in Custer County
- D. H. Peck House, Twin Falls, Idaho, listed on the NRHP in Twin Falls County
- Peck House, Geneva, Illinois
- Bradford Peck House, Lewiston, Maine, listed on the NRHP in Androscoggin County
- John M. Peck House, Waltham, Massachusetts, listed on the NRHP in Middlesex County
- Peck-Bowen House, Rehoboth, Massachusetts, listed on the NRHP in Bristol County
- Peck-Porter House, Walpole, New Hampshire, listed on the NRHP in Cheshire County
- Peck House (Chatham, New York), listed on the NRHP in Columbia County
- Henry M. Peck House, Haverstraw, New York, listed on the NRHP in Rockland County
- J. Franklin Peck House, Lima, New York, listed on the NRHP in Livingston County
- Thomas Peck Farmhouse, Lima, New York, listed on the NRHP in Livingston County
- Judge William V. Peck House, Portsmouth, Ohio, listed on the NRHP in Scioto County
- L. W. Peck House, Eagleville, Ohio, listed on the NRHP in Ashtabula County
- Capt. Barton Peck House, Goliad, Texas, listed on the NRHP in Goliad County
- Peck-Crim-Chesser House, Philippi, West Virginia, listed on the NRHP in Barbour County
- Walter L. Peck House, Oconomowoc, Wisconsin, listed on the NRHP in Waukesha County
- Clarence Peck Residence, Oconomowoc, Wisconsin, listed on the NRHP in Waukesha County
