= National Register of Historic Places listings in Ashtabula County, Ohio =

Location of Ashtabula County in Ohio

This is a list of the National Register of Historic Places listings in Ashtabula County, Ohio.

This is intended to be a complete list of the properties and districts on the National Register of Historic Places in Ashtabula County, Ohio, United States. The locations of National Register properties and districts for which the latitude and longitude coordinates are included below, may be seen in an online map.

There are 41 properties and districts listed on the National Register in the county, including 1 National Historic Landmark. Another property was once listed but has been removed.

This National Park Service list is complete through NPS recent listings posted April 10, 2026.

== Current listings ==
	Name on the Register	Image	Date listed	Location	City or town	Description
1	Ashtabula County Courthouse Group	Ashtabula County Courthouse Group	June 30, 1975 (#75001316)	Northwestern corner of Jefferson and Chestnut Sts. 41°44′19″N 80°46′12″W	Jefferson	
2	Ashtabula Harbor Light	Ashtabula Harbor Light	August 4, 1983 (#83001943)	Ashtabula Harbor; 41°55′06″N 80°47′45″W	Ashtabula	
3	Ashtabula Harbour Commercial District	Ashtabula Harbour Commercial District	September 5, 1975 (#75001311)	Both sides of W. 5th St. from its 1200 block to the Ashtabula River; 41°53′58″N 80°47′59″W	Ashtabula	
4	Ashtabula Main Avenue Historic District		August 27, 2020 (#100005467)	Roughly bounded by Park Pl., Collins Blvd., West 48th St., Center St., and Park Ave. 41°51′56″N 80°46′56″W	Ashtabula	
5	Ashtabula Post Office and Federal Building		June 17, 2019 (#100004053)	4400 Main Ave. 41°52′02″N 80°46′53″W	Ashtabula	
6	Eliphalet Austin House	Eliphalet Austin House	February 24, 1975 (#75001313)	1879 State Route 45 in Austinburg; 41°46′31″N 80°51′19″W	Austinburg Township	
7	Blakeslee Log Cabin	Blakeslee Log Cabin	April 1, 1998 (#98000319)	441 Seven Hills Rd., south of Ashtabula; 41°50′41″N 80°46′09″W	Plymouth Township	
8	Boice Fort and Village Site	Boice Fort and Village Site	July 24, 1974 (#74001398)	Western side of Pymatuning Creek, near Wayne; 41°32′25″N 80°38′10″W	Wayne Township	
9	Michael Cahill House	Michael Cahill House	October 5, 1988 (#88001711)	1106 Walnut Boulevard; 41°54′04″N 80°48′01″W	Ashtabula	Bed and breakfast since 1986
10	Castle Block		March 26, 2020 (#100005127)	323-355 Center St. 41°51′54″N 80°47′07″W	Ashtabula	
11	The Cleveland Hotel	The Cleveland Hotel	December 20, 2007 (#07001294)	230-238 State St. 41°56′39″N 80°33′18″W	Conneaut	
12	Congregational Church of Austinburg	Congregational Church of Austinburg	December 22, 1978 (#78002001)	State Route 307 in Austinburg; 41°46′17″N 80°51′22″W	Austinburg Township	
13	Conneaut Harbor West Breakwater Light	Conneaut Harbor West Breakwater Light	April 10, 1992 (#92000243)	Western breakwater pierhead at the harbor entrance 41°58′47″N 80°33′29″W	Conneaut	
14	Conneaut Light Station Keeper's Dwelling	Conneaut Light Station Keeper's Dwelling	August 21, 1992 (#92001078)	1059 Harbor St. 41°58′01″N 80°33′07″W	Conneaut	
15	Conneaut Works	Conneaut Works	July 30, 1974 (#74001393)	Off Mill Rd. 41°56′13″N 80°34′11″W	Conneaut	
16	David Cummins Octagon House	David Cummins Octagon House	September 9, 1974 (#74001394)	301 Liberty St. 41°56′28″N 80°33′26″W	Conneaut	
17	Eagle Cliff Hotel	Eagle Cliff Hotel	October 20, 1995 (#95001197)	5254 Lake Rd., E. 41°51′40″N 80°56′40″W	Geneva-on-the-Lake	
18	Joshua Reed Giddings Law Office	Joshua Reed Giddings Law Office	May 30, 1974 (#74001396)	112 N. Chestnut St. 41°44′26″N 80°46′09″W	Jefferson	
19	Griggs Grange No. 1467	Griggs Grange No. 1467	December 13, 1995 (#95001414)	1467 Brown Rd., north of Jefferson; 41°47′19″N 80°42′47″W	Plymouth Township	
20	Francis E. Harmon House	Francis E. Harmon House	February 24, 1975 (#75001312)	1641 E. Prospect Rd. 41°52′28″N 80°46′32″W	Ashtabula	
21	Harpersfield Covered Bridge	Harpersfield Covered Bridge	November 3, 1975 (#75001315)	County Road 154 over the Grand River; 41°45′22″N 80°56′40″W	Harpersfield Township	
22	Harwood Block	Harwood Block	March 21, 1978 (#78002002)	246, 250, and 256 Main St. 41°56′39″N 80°33′21″W	Conneaut	
23	John Henderson House	John Henderson House	November 7, 1976 (#76001368)	5248 Stanhope-Kelloggsville Rd. in West Andover; 41°36′28″N 80°36′44″W	Andover Township	
24	Hotel Ashtabula	Hotel Ashtabula	June 20, 1985 (#85001342)	4726 Main Ave. 41°51′50″N 80°46′58″W	Ashtabula	
25	Col. Erastus House House	Col. Erastus House House	July 30, 1974 (#74001397)	State Route 46 and Richmond-Footville Rd. at Rays Corner; 41°41′00″N 80°46′51″W	Lenox Township	
26	Col. William Hubbard House	Col. William Hubbard House	March 20, 1973 (#73001385)	Corner of Lake Ave. and Walnut Boulevard; 41°53′59″N 80°48′17″W	Ashtabula	
27	Jefferson Town Hall	Jefferson Town Hall	June 18, 1981 (#81000428)	27 E. Jefferson St. 41°44′19″N 80°46′05″W	Jefferson	
28	Kilpi Hall	Kilpi Hall	December 12, 1976 (#76001365)	1025 Buffalo St. 41°57′55″N 80°33′19″W	Conneaut	
29	Lake Shore & Michigan Southern Railroad Station	Lake Shore & Michigan Southern Railroad Station	October 14, 1982 (#82001357)	147 E. Jefferson St. 41°44′21″N 80°45′43″W	Jefferson	
30	Lake Shore And Michigan Southern Passenger Depot	Lake Shore And Michigan Southern Passenger Depot	March 27, 1975 (#75001314)	342 Depot St. 41°56′59″N 80°33′33″W	Conneaut	
31	Mother of Sorrows Church	Mother of Sorrows Church	March 9, 1995 (#95000170)	1500 W. 6th St. 41°53′45″N 80°48′13″W	Ashtabula	
32	New Lyme Institute	New Lyme Institute	January 1, 1976 (#76001367)	929 Brownville Rd. in South New Lyme; 41°34′57″N 80°47′02″W	New Lyme Township	
33	New Lyme Town Hall	New Lyme Town Hall	August 6, 1975 (#75001317)	North of South New Lyme at 6000 State Route 46; 41°35′09″N 80°46′42″W	New Lyme Township	
34	L. W. Peck House	L. W. Peck House	January 1, 1976 (#76001366)	2646 Eagleville Rd. in Eagleville; 41°42′54″N 80°50′48″W	Austinburg Township	
35	Rock Creek School	Rock Creek School	February 9, 2005 (#05000023)	2987 High St. 41°39′46″N 80°51′28″W	Rock Creek	
36	Shandy Hall	Shandy Hall	June 28, 1974 (#74001395)	6333 S. Ridge Rd., southwest of Geneva; 41°46′55″N 80°58′57″W	Harpersfield Township	
37	West Fifth Street Bridge	West Fifth Street Bridge	August 23, 1985 (#85001801)	State Route 531 over the Ashtabula River; 41°54′01″N 80°47′53″W	Ashtabula	
38	Windsor Corners District	Windsor Corners District	September 5, 1975 (#75001318)	U.S. Route 322 and State Route 534 in Windsor; 41°32′07″N 80°56′04″W	Windsor Township	
39	Windsor Mills Christ Church Episcopal	Windsor Mills Christ Church Episcopal	May 29, 1975 (#75001319)	Wisell Rd. and U.S. Route 322 at Windsor Mills; 41°32′09″N 80°57′43″W	Windsor Township	
40	Windsor Mills Fort and Village Site	Windsor Mills Fort and Village Site	October 21, 1975 (#75001321)	Off U.S. Route 322, southeast of Windsor Mills; 41°31′53″N 80°58′30″W	Windsor Township	
41	Wiswell Road Covered Bridge	Wiswell Road Covered Bridge	April 11, 1973 (#73001386)	Wiswell Rd. over Phelps Creek at Windsor Mills; 41°31′59″N 80°57′50″W	Windsor Township	

== Former listing ==
	Name on the Register	Image	Date listed	Date removed	Location	City or town	Description
1	Park Avenue High School		January 17, 1975 (#75002168)	September 15, 1975	4325 Park Avenue; 41°52′07″N 80°46′59″W	Ashtabula	

== See also ==
- List of National Historic Landmarks in Ohio
- Listings in neighboring counties: Crawford (PA), Erie (PA), Geauga, Lake, Trumbull
- National Register of Historic Places listings in Ohio
