= Rome Township, Ashtabula County, Ohio =

Township in Ohio, US

- Township
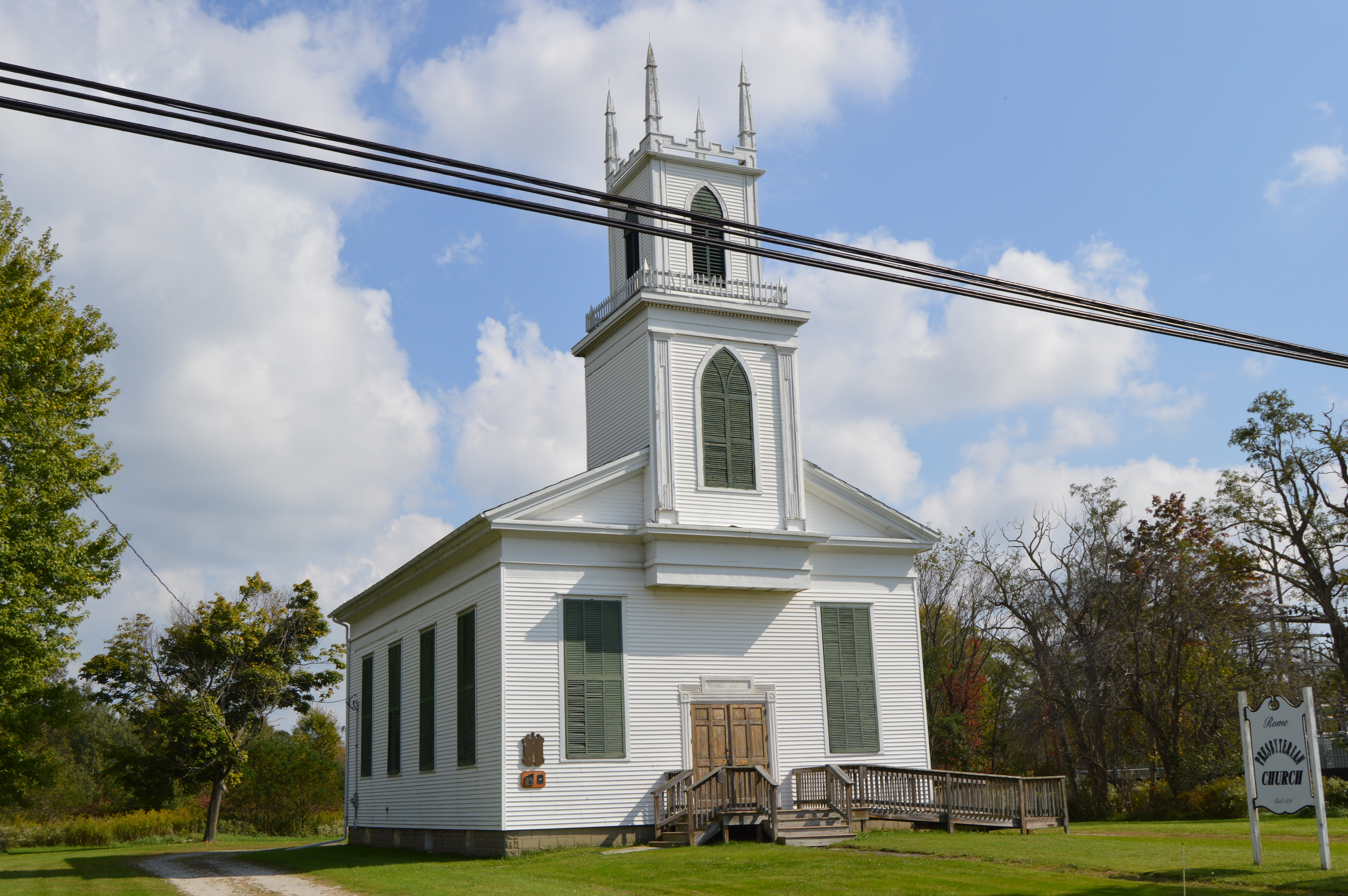
- Rome Presbyterian Church, built 1836

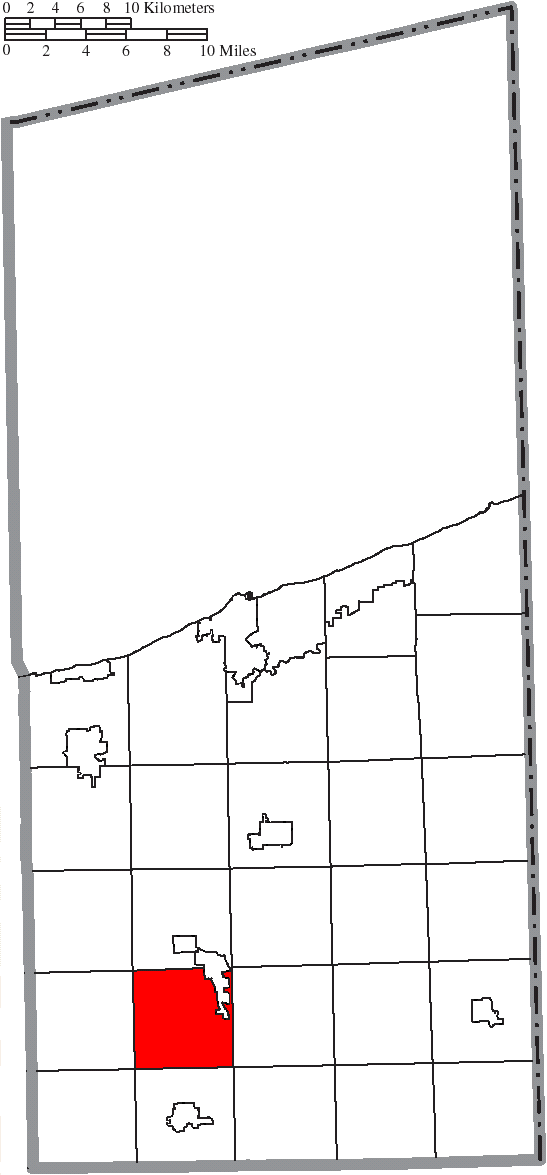
- Location of Rome Township in Ashtabula County
- Coordinates: 41°36′46″N 80°50′9″W
- Country: United States
- State: Ohio
- County: Ashtabula

Area
  - Total: 24.1 sq mi (62.4 km^{2})
  - Land: 23.5 sq mi (60.9 km^{2})
  - Water: 0.54 sq mi (1.4 km^{2})
- Elevation: 860 ft (262 m)

Population (2020)
  - Total: 1,854
  - Density: 78.8/sq mi (30.4/km^{2})
- Time zone: UTC-5 (Eastern (EST))
  - Summer (DST): UTC-4 (EDT)
- ZIP code: 44085
- Area code: 440
- FIPS code: 39-68224
- GNIS feature ID: 1085741

Rome Township is one of the twenty-seven townships of Ashtabula County, Ohio, United States. The 2020 census found 1,854 people in the township.

== Geography ==
Located in the southwestern part of the county, it borders the following townships:

- Morgan Township - north
- Lenox Township - northeast corner
- New Lyme Township - east
- Colebrook Township - southeast corner
- Orwell Township - south
- Windsor Township - southwest corner
- Hartsgrove Township - west
- Trumbull Township - northwest corner

Part of the village of Roaming Shores is located in northeastern Rome Township. The unincorporated community of Rome is located in the center of the township.

== Name and history ==
Some say the township was named after Rome, Italy, while others believe the name is a transfer from Rome, New York. Statewide, other Rome Townships are located in Athens and Lawrence counties.

The first houses in Rome Township were built by settlers Elijah Crosby and Abner Hall in 1805, but the first permanent settler in the township was former Connecticut resident William Crowell, who arrived in the following year.

== Government ==
The township is governed by a three-member board of trustees, who are elected in November of odd-numbered years to a four-year term beginning on the following January 1. Two are elected in the year after the presidential election and one is elected in the year before it. There is also an elected township fiscal officer, who serves a four-year term beginning on April 1 of the year after the election, which is held in November of the year before the presidential election. Vacancies in the fiscal officership or on the board of trustees are filled by the remaining trustees. Currently, the board is composed of chairman Eric Eland, and members Gary Hunter and Tom Gage.
