= David Cummins Octagon House =

Historic house in Ohio, United States

- U.S. National Register of Historic Places
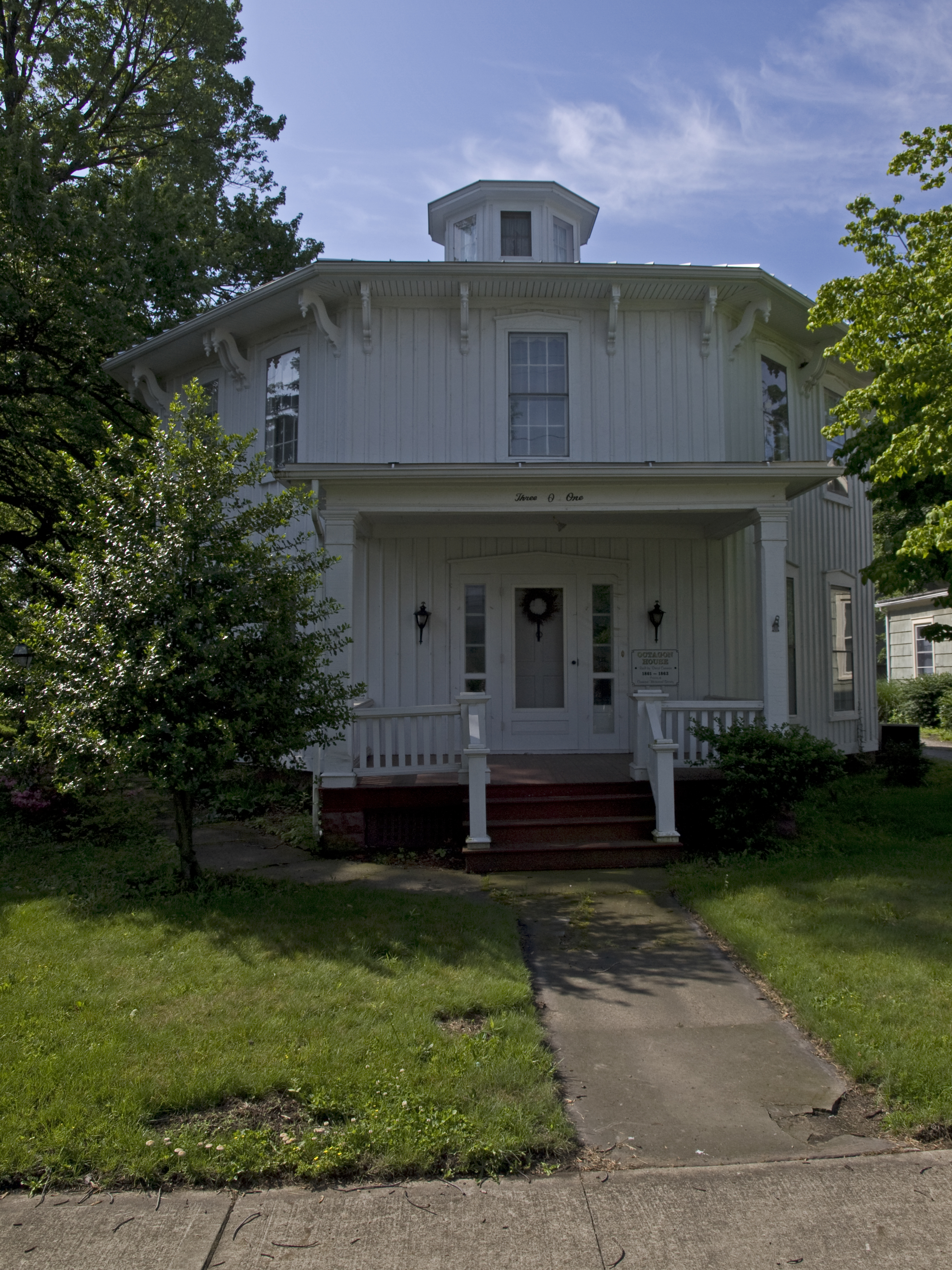
- The front of the house

- Location within Ohio Location within the United States
- Location: 301 Liberty Street, Conneaut, Ohio
- Coordinates: 41°56′28″N 80°33′26″W
- Built: c. 1860
- NRHP reference No.: 74001394
- Added to NRHP: September 9, 1974

The David Cummins Octagon House is a historic octagon-shaped house located at 301 Liberty Street in Conneaut, Ohio. Built during the 1860s, it is named after David Cummins, the founder of the Cummins Canning Company in Conneaut. The house had a tunnel that ran from it to the nearby Conneaut Creek, leading to speculation that it served as a station on the Underground Railroad. However, this claim has been questioned and has been suggested that the tunnel might have belonged to a previous structure on the property.

The house was added to the National Register of Historic Places on September 9, 1974.

== See also ==
- List of Registered Historic Places in Ashtabula County, Ohio
- List of octagon houses
