= Ed Cushman =

American baseball player (1852–1915)

- Pitcher
- Born: March 27, 1852; Eagleville, Ohio, U.S.
- Died: September 26, 1915 (aged 63); Erie, Pennsylvania, U.S.
- Batted: Right Threw: Left

MLB debut
- July 6, 1883, for the Buffalo Bisons

Last MLB appearance
- October 11, 1890, for the Toledo Maumees

MLB statistics
- Win/Loss Record: 62-80
- Earned run average: 3.86
- Strikeouts: 607
- Stats at Baseball Reference

Teams
- Buffalo Bisons (1883); Milwaukee Brewers (UA) (1884); Philadelphia Athletics (1885); New York Metropolitans (1885–1887); Toledo Maumees (1890)

Career highlights and awards
- Pitched a no-hitter on September 28, 1884

Edgar Leander Cushman (March 27, 1852 – September 26, 1915) was an American Major League Baseball pitcher from 1883–1890 for five teams in three different Major leagues spanning his six-year career.

== Career ==
Ed was born in Eagleville, Ohio, and made his first appearance in Majors with the 1883 Buffalo Bisons, but was only able to pitch in seven games, all of which he started, and had a respectable win–loss record of 3–3, as well as a 3.93 ERA.

For the following season, he played for the minor league Milwaukee Brewers, who would later join the newly formed and ill-fated Union Association as a late season replacement. Ed pitched extremely well, in the four games in which he pitched to finish the season, he had a record of 4–0, with a 1.00 ERA, 47 strikeouts in 36 innings pitched. He completed all four starts and pitched two shutouts, one of which was a no-hitter thrown on September 28, 1884, vs. the Washington Nationals, a 5–0 victory. It was the second and last no-hitter thrown in the Union Association, and was the second game the Brewers had played since joining the league as a late season replacement. He followed up his no-hitter with eight more hitless innings on October 4, against the Boston Reds, when he finally surrendered a hit, a ninth inning bloop single, but holds on for the 2–0 shutout victory.

His remarkable season with the Brewers earned him a shot with the Philadelphia Athletics of the American Association for the 1885 season. After 10 starts, he then moved to and finished the season with the New York Metropolitans, also of the Association. Late in the season, on September 16, in a game against the Pittsburgh Alleganys, he struck out eight batters in a row. He pitched for them during both the 1886 and 1887 seasons, earning the team award of Pitcher of the Year for the 1885 and 1886 seasons.

For the 1888 season he returned to the minors, this time in the Western Association and played for Charlie Morton's Des Moines team. When Morton took over the minor league Toledo Maumee team, he moved several of his Des Moines players with him, including Cushman, who would play for that team through the 1889 season, and in 1890 season when the team earned Major League status by joining the American Association. This was the only season the Maumees played in the Majors.

== Post-career ==
After his playing days, he worked as a conductor on the New York Central Railroad, and was also a restaurant owner at one time. Ed died in Erie, Pennsylvania at the age of 63, and was buried in Erie Cemetery.

== See also ==
- List of Major League Baseball no-hitters

Achievements
Preceded by Dick Burns	No-hitter pitcher September 28, 1884	Succeeded by Sam Kimber
