= L. W. Peck House =

Residence in Eagleville, Ashtabula County, Ohio

- U.S. National Register of Historic Places
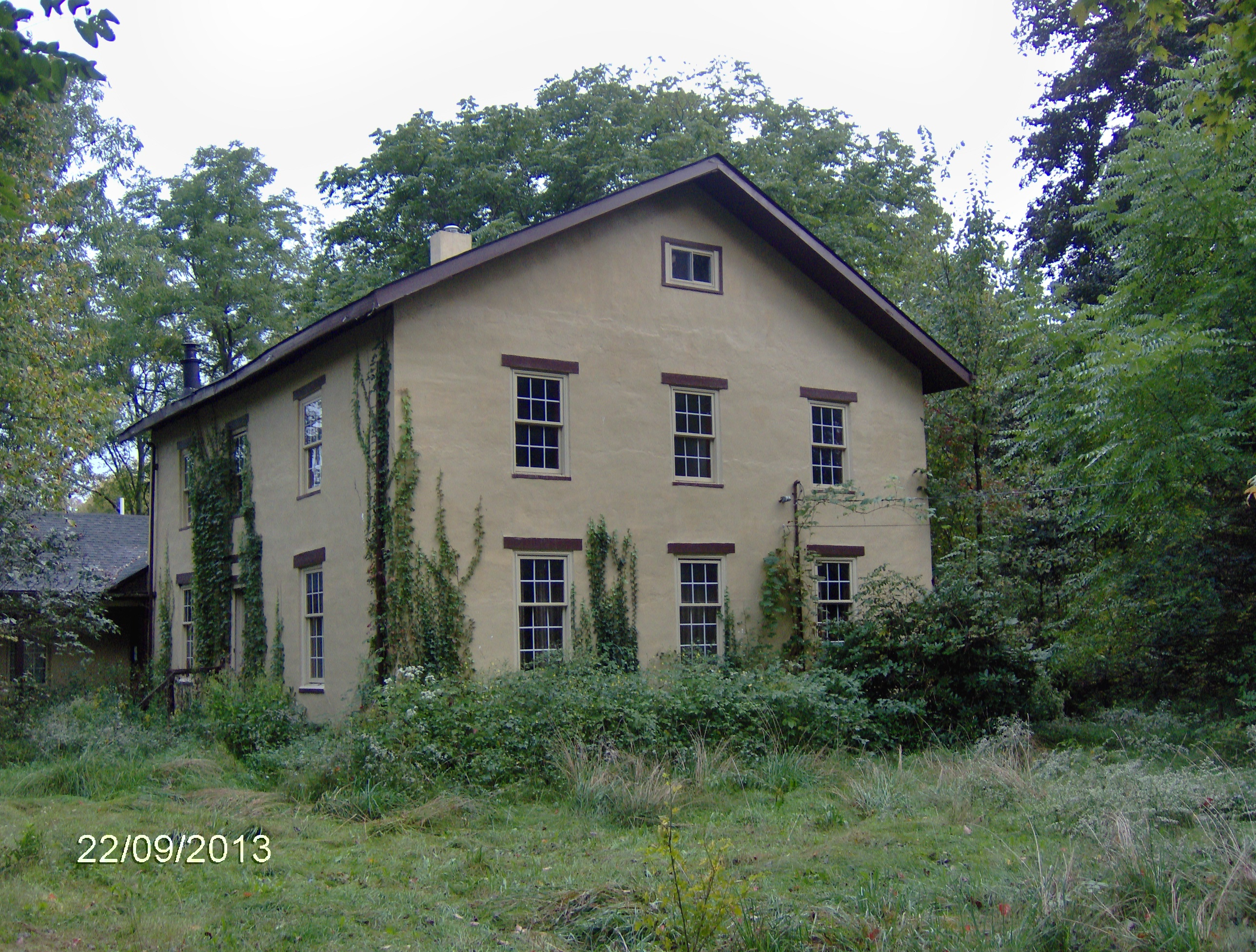

- Location within Ohio
- Location: 2646 Eagleville Rd., Eagleville, Ohio
- Coordinates: 41°42′54″N 80°50′47″W
- Area: 1 acre (0.40 ha)
- Built: c. 1848
- NRHP reference No.: 76001366
- Added to NRHP: January 1, 1976

L. W. Peck House is a residence in Eagleville, Ashtabula County, Ohio. It is listed on the National Register of Historic Places. It has an adobe brick wall construction untypical of the area. Peck served as a county coroner. He married Charlotte Irene Tuttle whose family is credited with building the home ca. 1848.

The house is at 2646 Eagleville Road. It was listed on the National Register in 1976.

== See also ==
- National Register of Historic Places listings in Ashtabula County, Ohio
