= Orwell Township, Ashtabula County, Ohio =

Township in Ohio, US

- Township
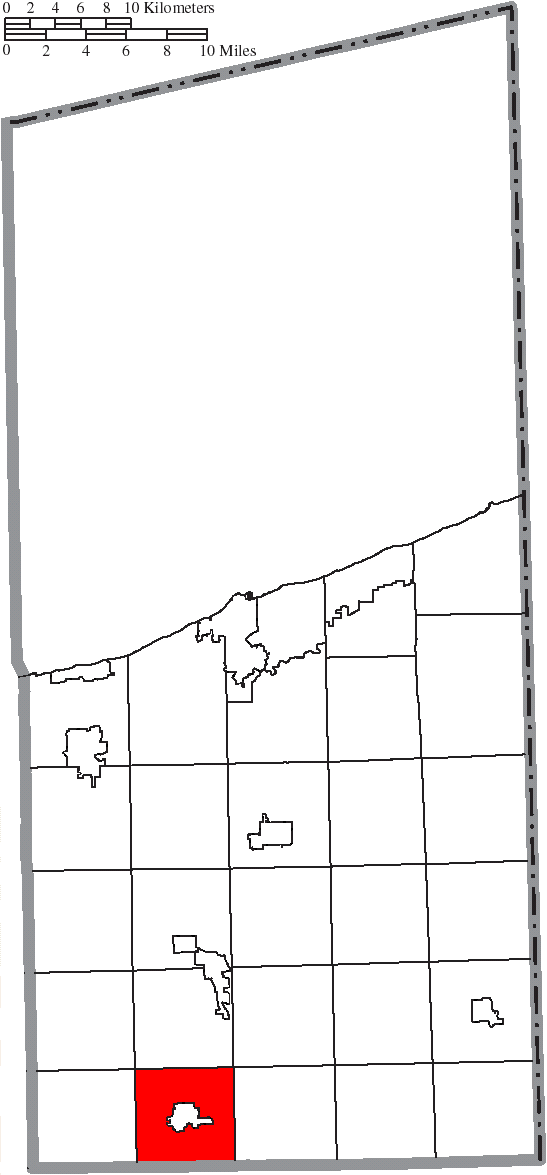
- Location of Orwell Township in Ashtabula County
- Coordinates: 41°32′14″N 80°51′20″W
- Country: United States
- State: Ohio
- County: Ashtabula

Area
  - Total: 23.7 sq mi (61.5 km^{2})
  - Land: 23.7 sq mi (61.5 km^{2})
  - Water: 0 sq mi (0.0 km^{2})
- Elevation: 932 ft (284 m)

Population (2020)
  - Total: 3,077
  - Density: 131/sq mi (50.5/km^{2})
- Time zone: UTC-5 (Eastern (EST))
  - Summer (DST): UTC-4 (EDT)
- ZIP code: 44076
- Area code: 440
- FIPS code: 39-58870
- GNIS feature ID: 1085736

Orwell Township is one of the twenty-seven townships of Ashtabula County, Ohio, United States. The 2020 census found 3,077 people in the township.

== Geography ==
Located on the southwestern edge of the county, it borders the following townships:

- Rome Township - north
- New Lyme Township - northeast corner
- Colebrook Township - east
- Greene Township, Trumbull County - southeast corner
- Bloomfield Township, Trumbull County - south
- Mesopotamia Township, Trumbull County - southwest corner
- Windsor Township - west
- Hartsgrove Township - northwest corner

The village of Orwell is located in central Orwell Township.

== Name and history ==
It is the only Orwell Township statewide.

The first settler in Orwell Township was former New York resident A.H. Paine, who arrived in 1815. The township was named Leffingwell Township until 1826.

== Government ==
The township is governed by a three-member board of trustees, who are elected in November of odd-numbered years to a four-year term beginning on the following January 1. Two are elected in the year after the presidential election and one is elected in the year before it. There is also an elected township fiscal officer, who serves a four-year term beginning on April 1 of the year after the election, which is held in November of the year before the presidential election. Vacancies in the fiscal officership or on the board of trustees are filled by the remaining trustees.
