= Hartsgrove Township, Ashtabula County, Ohio =

Township in Ohio, US

- Township
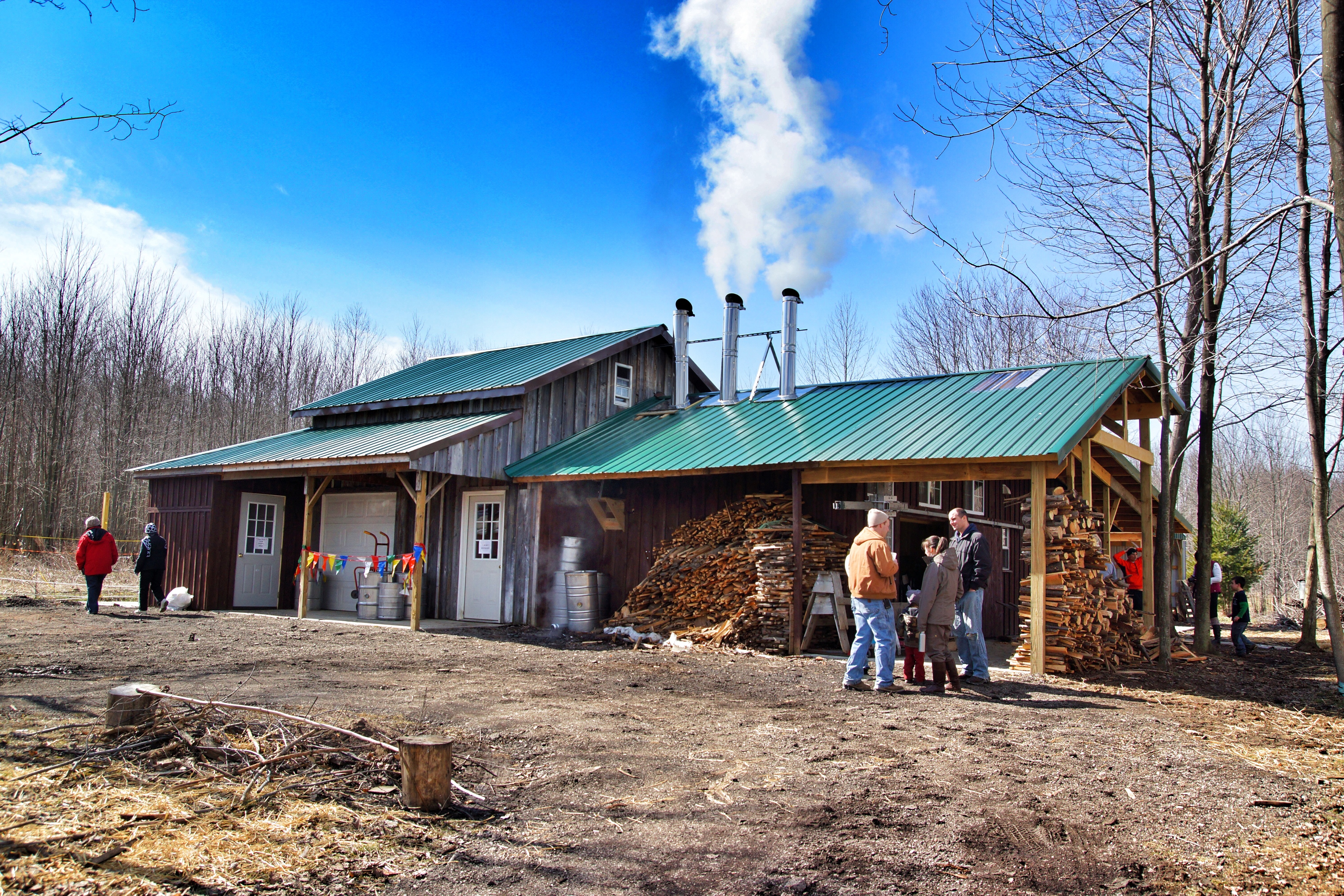
- People stand around a shed at a Higley Road farm

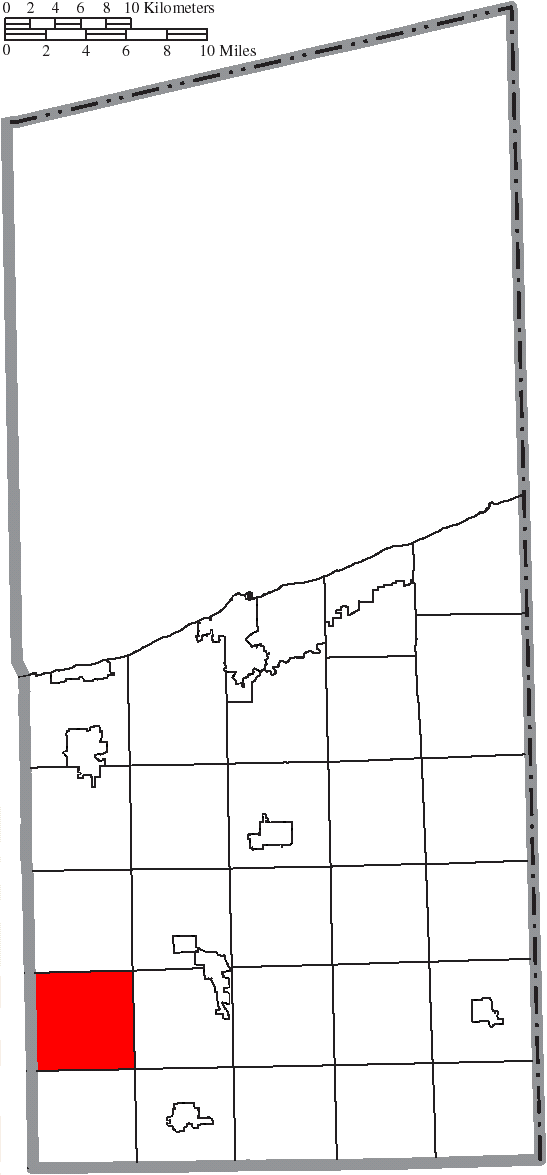
- Location of Hartsgrove Township in Ashtabula County
- Coordinates: 41°36′21″N 80°57′12″W
- Country: United States
- State: Ohio
- County: Ashtabula

Area
  - Total: 24.9 sq mi (64.5 km^{2})
  - Land: 24.9 sq mi (64.5 km^{2})
  - Water: 0 sq mi (0.0 km^{2})
- Elevation: 1,027 ft (313 m)

Population (2020)
  - Total: 1,624
  - Density: 64/sq mi (24.8/km^{2})
- Time zone: UTC-5 (Eastern (EST))
  - Summer (DST): UTC-4 (EDT)
- ZIP code: 44085
- Area code: 440
- FIPS code: 39-34300
- GNIS feature ID: 1085728
- Website: hartsgrove.org

Historical population
Census	Pop.	Note	%±
1990	1,157		—
2000	1,395		20.6%
2010	1,597		14.5%
2020	1,624		1.7%
U.S. Census:

Hartsgrove Township is one of the twenty-seven townships of Ashtabula County, Ohio, United States. The 2020 census found 1,624 people in the township.

== Geography ==
Located on the southwestern edge of the county, it borders the following townships:

- Trumbull Township - north
- Morgan Township - northeast corner
- Rome Township - east
- Orwell Township - southeast corner
- Windsor Township - south
- Huntsburg Township, Geauga County - southwest corner
- Montville Township, Geauga County - west
- Thompson Township, Geauga County - northwest corner

No municipalities are located in Hartsgrove Township.

== Name and history ==
Hartsgrove Township was organized in 1830. It was named for Richard W. Hart, an early settler in the area and native of Connecticut.

== Government ==
The township is governed by a three-member board of trustees, who are elected in November of odd-numbered years to a four-year term beginning on the following January 1. Two are elected in the year after the presidential election and one is elected in the year before it. There is also an elected township fiscal officer, who serves a four-year term beginning on April 1 of the year after the election, which is held in November of the year before the presidential election. Vacancies in the fiscal officership or on the board of trustees are filled by the remaining trustees. Currently, the members of the board are Bruce Gottron, Paul Hall, and Robert Williams.
