= New Lyme Institute =

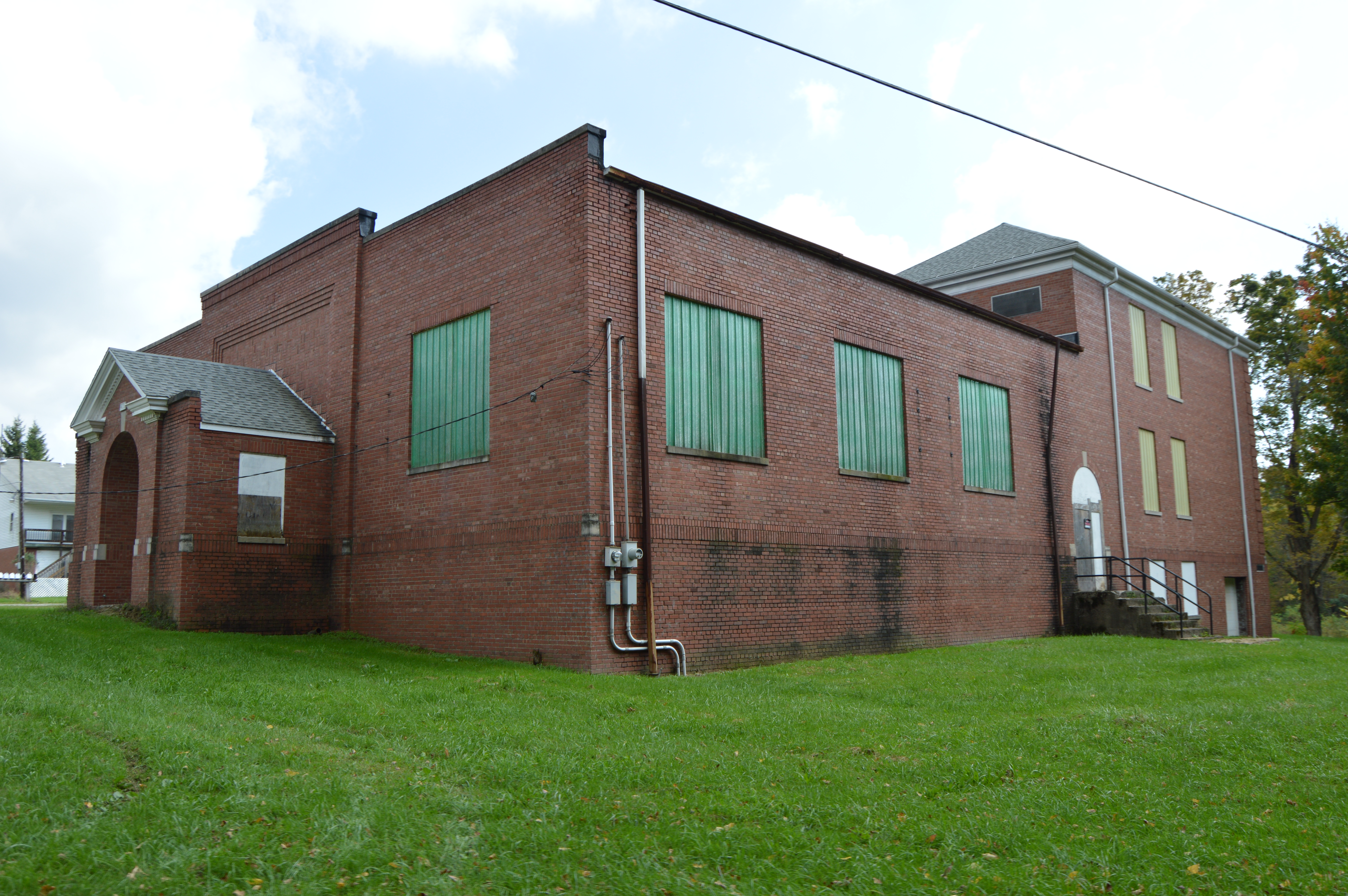
- (2014)
- New Lyme Township, Ashtabula County, Ohio, U.S.

Information
- Other name: NLI
- Former name: Northern Collegiate Business Institute
- Motto: To secure the HIghest possible mental, moral and social improvement
- Established: 1879
- Closed: 1923
- Grades: 1-11
- Gender: Co-ed
- National Register of Historic Places listings in Ashtabula County, Ohio (1976)

New Lyme Institute (acronym, NLI; originally, Northern Collegiate Business Institute; later, Deming School; 1879–1923) is a defunct American secondary school for grades one through 11, in Ashtabula County, Ohio. Also known as New Lyme Seminary and Northern Ohio Collegiate and Business Institute, it was located at 929 Brownville Rd. in South New Lyme. The Christy Summer School of Pedagogy was an added institute some years later. After disestablishment in 1923, it became the Deming School. In 1976, NLI was added to the National Register of Historic Places listings in Ashtabula County, Ohio.

== Establishment ==
In the year 1876, the pioneer residents of New Lyme, Ohio were aroused with a keen desire for. an institution of learning, for the benefit of their young people and those of future generations. The following year, the agitation began to take hold, and when the cooperation of Judge William S. Deming was solicited, the success of the project became practically assured. The Judge showed his interest by volunteering to give US$3,000 toward the proposed school whenever the citizens would raise an equivalent amount, and, in addition, he agreed to donate the campus, and make other generous gifts. He suggested that subscriptions be solicited to be paid on an installment basis, as called for by the building committee. The citizens were able to overcome many hardships, due to lack of finances, and finally succeeded in supplementing the gifts of Judge Deming.

The institution was founded in 1878 under the name of the Northern Collegiate Business Institute, but was not incorporated until 1883.

The original building was finished and furnished, and dedicated on August 21, 1879, an elaborate program attending the ceremonies.

== Architecture and fittings ==
A recitation hall, a boys' dormitory and a ladies' hall were first erected. The last named was consumed by fire a few years later, whereupon the alumni of the institute erected Tuckerman Memorial Hall, a modern and well equipped building, affording comfort and pleasure to young ladies attending the school. The buildings of New Lyme Institute were located in a highly elevated spot on the left bank of the Lebanon Creek. A semi-circle of maples surrounded the school.

== History ==
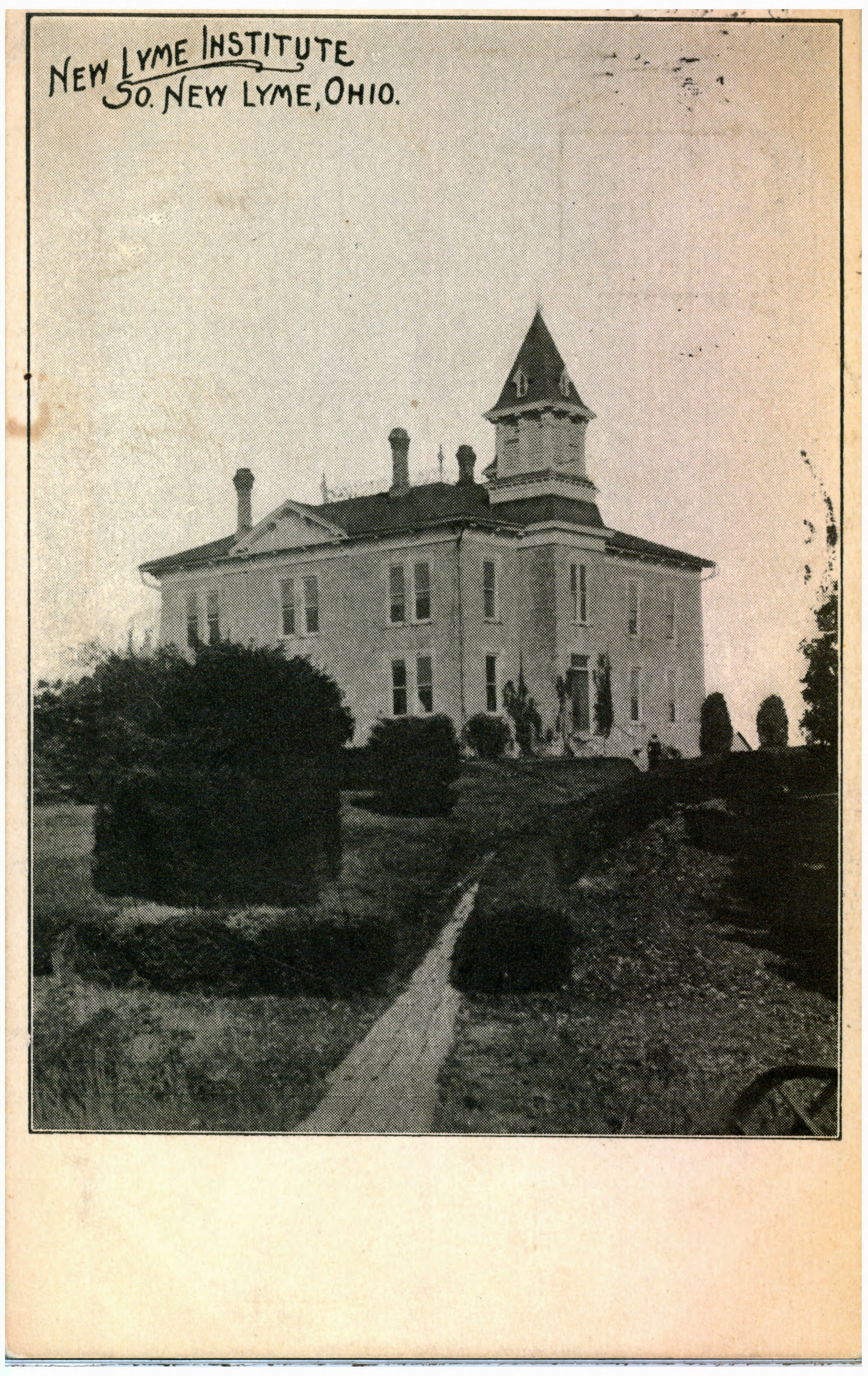
New Lyme Institute (1903)

When James Christy died and left his small fortune to be devoted to educational uses in the county, there immediately arose petitions from both New Lyme and Grand River institutes for the dowry to be turned over to them to be dispensed. In this contest, NLI had the better of the argument, for Judge Deming said he would give as much more as there was in the fund if it were turned over to the New Lyme school.

Calvin Dodge was the executor of the Christy estate, and when he filed his final report, in August 1888, it showed the total value of the estate to be about US$27,000. The manner of disposal was put up to the County Teachers' Institute, convened in Geneva, Ohio on August 9, 1888, and that body voted to create the Christy Summer School of Pedagogy, which proved a great advantage to teachers and prospective teachers.

In the fall of 1882, Prof. Jacob E. Tuckerman, A. M., Ph.D., became president of the NLI, and remained at its head for 15 years. Closely associated with Dr. Tuckerman, during these years, was M. L. Hubbard, principal of the commercial department and teacher of expression. These, combined with the rest of the faculty, were responsible for the ultimate success of the school, and during their administration, the attendance reached over 300 students yearly, many of whom became persons of renown later, including: Benjamin E. Chapin, who was a noted Lincoln impersonator and author of The Son of Democracy; Judge Florence E. Allen, of Cleveland, granddaughter of Prof. Tuckerman, who has served as prosecuting attorney for Cuyahoga County, judge of the Common Pleas Court and judge of the Supreme Court of Ohio.

Some years later, a strong endeavor was made by the trustees of NLI to procure the State Normal School, but politics and greater inducements prevailed in favor of Kent, Ohio. Then an attempt was made to secure a state school of agriculture, but by a veto of the Governor, a similar disappointment resulted. An endowment campaign was started in hope of establishing the Benjamin Chapin School of Expression, with Rev. C. L. Parker, of Cleveland, as financial agent.

By the will of Judge Deming, the trustees of NLI came into possession of the land and six dwelling houses in "Newtown," and also a US$25,000 endowment fund, which promised perpetuity to the institution, and it was hoped it could be maintained and continue to rank as one of the best preparatory schools of the county. The endowment was not sufficient, however, to warrant a continuance.

When the bill passed the Legislature making it compulsory for each township to maintain a centralized school, or pay the expense of sending their students elsewhere, the trustees turned over the institute buildings and campus to the township for centralization purposes. Thus, the New Lyme Institute ceased to exist in 1923.

== Courses of study ==
The teaching force consisted of seven regular professional instructors who taught three leading courses of study, and also a commercial course and a music course. The Academic course embraced three years' study of Latin, two years of Greek or German, a thorough knowledge of algebra, geometry, trigonometry and surveying, history of the United States and general history, civil government, physics, chemistry, botany, astronomy, logic, rhetoric, psychology and Butler's Analogy. The Normal course embraced the same English studies as the Academic course, together with pedagogics. The College Preparaory courses was such as to admit to the best U.S. colleges.
