= Colebrook Township =

Colebrook Township may refer to the following townships in the United States:

- Colebrook Township, Ashtabula County, Ohio
- Colebrook Township, Clinton County, Pennsylvania
