= Griggs Grange No. 1467 =

- U.S. National Register of Historic Places
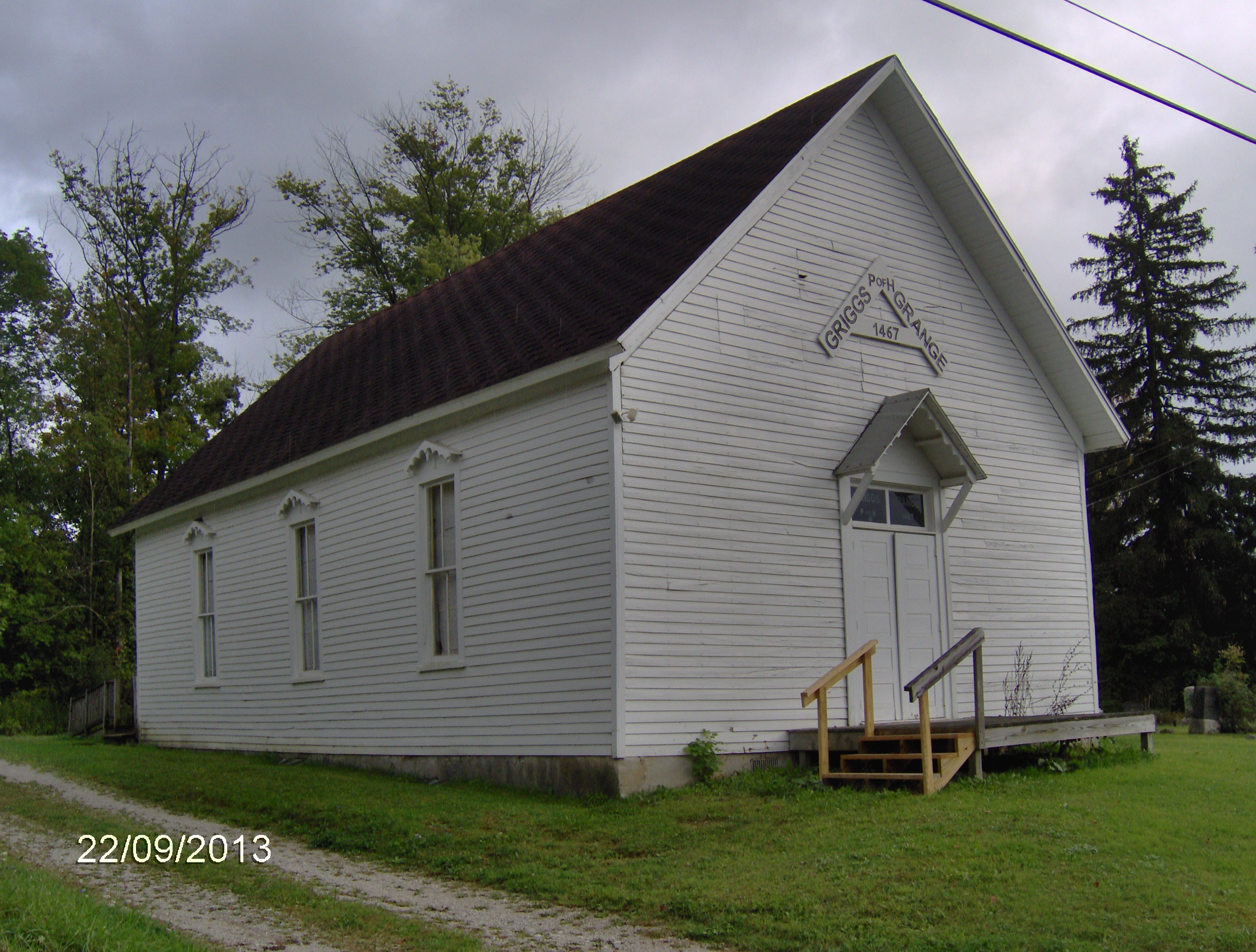
- Northern side and front

- Location within Ohio Location within the United States
- Nearest city: Jefferson, Ohio
- Coordinates: 41°47′19″N 80°42′47″W
- Area: 0.5 acres (0.20 ha)
- NRHP reference No.: 95001414
- Added to NRHP: December 13, 1995

The Griggs Grange No. 1467 is a historic Grange hall located near the village of Jefferson in rural Ashtabula County, Ohio, United States. Constructed in the 1890s and occupied by a local Grange since its early years, it has been named a historic site.

The building's construction date is uncertain; its first recorded appearance occurred in the early 1890s. Although once used as a house of worship, it has been home to the Griggs Grange since the chapter's founding in April 1897. It was one of almost 850 Ohio agricultural organizations recorded in 1907 by the Interstate Commerce Commission. The group continues meeting in the hall, with most of its finances arising from fundraisers such as raffles. Nationally, Grange membership dropped by 40% between 1992 and 2007, and Ashtabula County's membership has paralleled the national trend; the 1907 Interstate Commerce Commission recorded four Grange chapters in the vicinity of Jefferson alone, but just seven existed countywide in late 2009, at which time Griggs' membership had fallen to the teens. Nevertheless, the group remains active; the statewide Grange organization recognized Griggs for its community service in 2013.

Built of wood, the Grange hall is covered with an asphalt roof and rests on a stone foundation. It is a simple gable-front structure with three side windows. The roof projects over the gable to form eaves, while the entrance is set in the center of the gable, sheltered by a tiny roof with simple structural brackets.

In late 1995, the Griggs Grange was listed on the National Register of Historic Places, qualifying because of its place in local history. It is one of five National Register-listed locations in and around Jefferson, and one of nearly forty such sites countywide.
