= Harpersfield Covered Bridge =

Covered bridge in Ohio, United States

- U.S. National Register of Historic Places
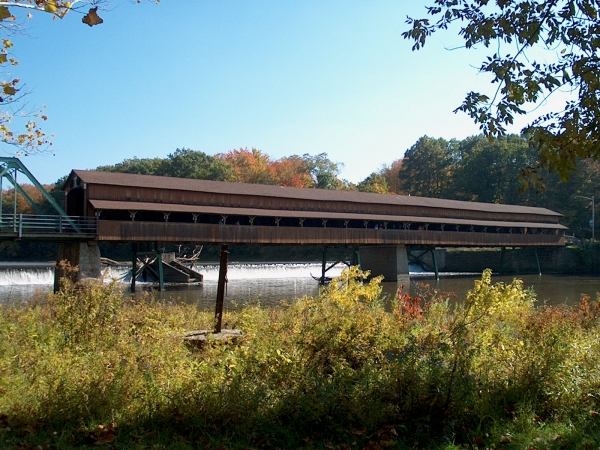

- Location within Ohio Location within the United States
- Location: County Road 154 over the Grand River, Harpersfield, Ohio
- Coordinates: 41°45′22″N 80°56′40″W
- Area: less than one acre
- Built: 1873
- Built by: Potter
- Architectural style: Howe truss covered bridge
- NRHP reference No.: 75001315
- Added to NRHP: November 3, 1975
- Coordinates: 41°45′21″N 80°56′39″W
- Locale: Ashtabula County

Characteristics
- Design: Double span, Howe truss
- Total length: 228 feet (69.5 m)

History
- Construction start: 1868

Location
- Interactive map of Harpersfield Bridge

Harpersfield Bridge is a covered bridge spanning the Grand River in Harpersfield Township, Ashtabula County, Ohio, United States. This double-span Howe truss bridge, one of currently 17 drivable covered bridges in the county, is the third longest covered bridge in Ohio at 228 feet. A flood in 1913 washed away the land at the north end of the bridge, and the steel span was subsequently attached. The bridge features a walkway, added during its renovation in 1991–1992. The bridge also features an Ashtabula County MetroPark at its north end and is listed on the National Register of Historic Places. The bridge's WGCB number is 35-04-19, and it is located approximately 3.4 miles (5.5 kilometres) south of Geneva.

== History ==
- 1868 or 1873 – Bridge constructed
- 1913 – Northern part of land washed out, steel span added
- 1962 – Bypassed when State Route 534 was rerouted around the settlement of Harpersfield
- 1975 - Added to National Register of Historic Places
- 1991–1992 and 2022–2024 – Bridge renovated

== Dimensions ==
- Length: 228 feet (69 m)
- Overhead clearance: 12 feet 9 inches (3.89 m)

== Gallery ==
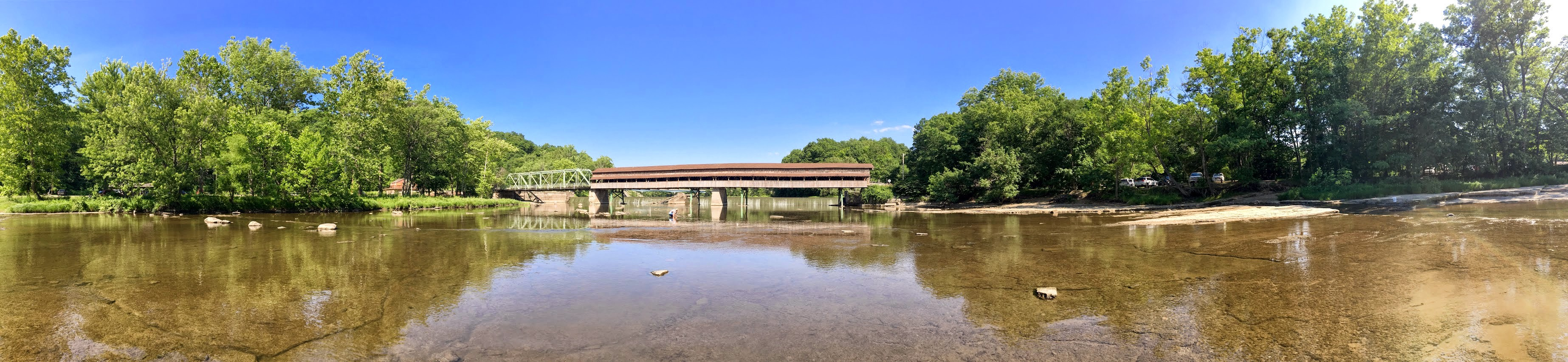
A panoramic view of the bridge in June 2016.

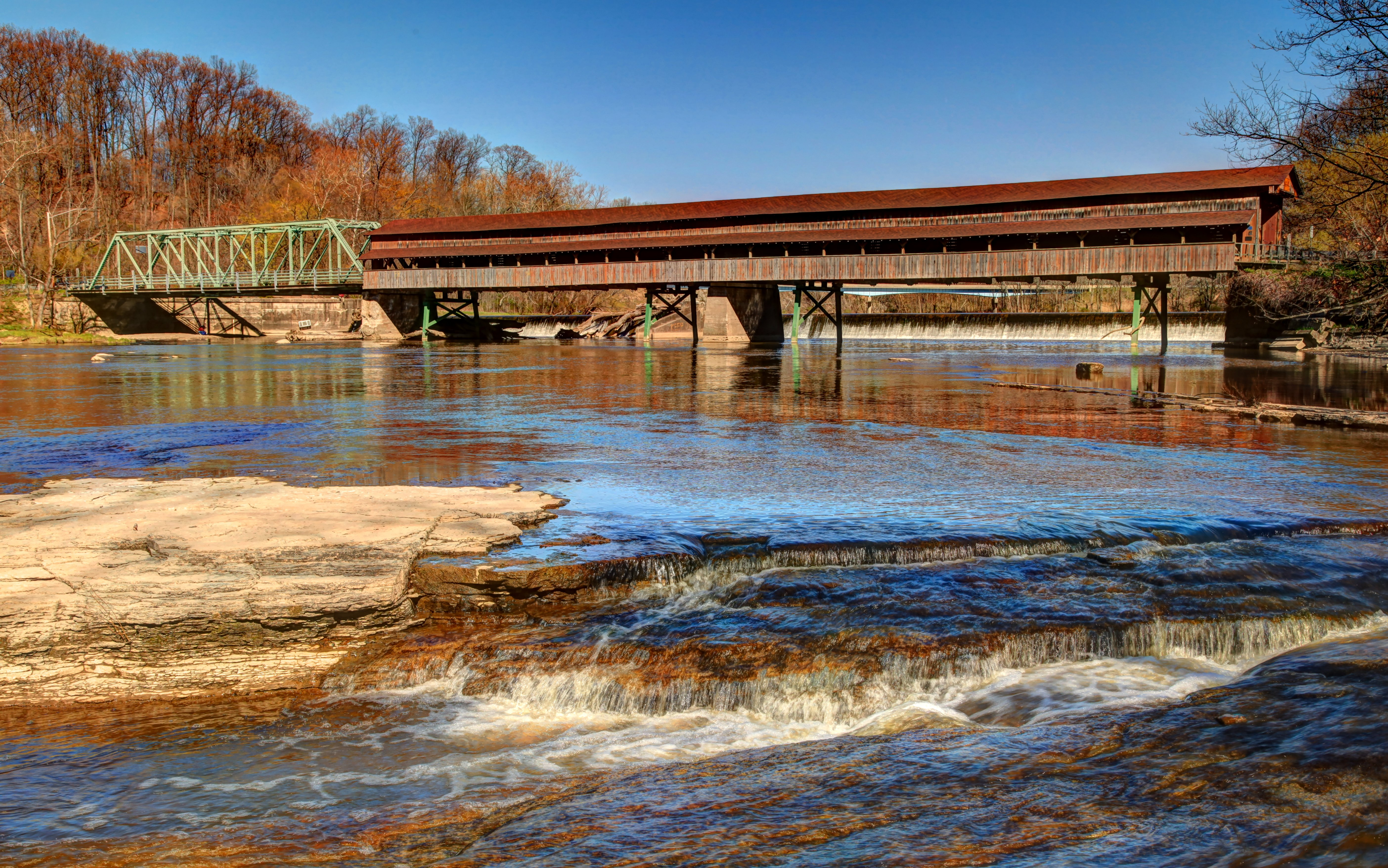

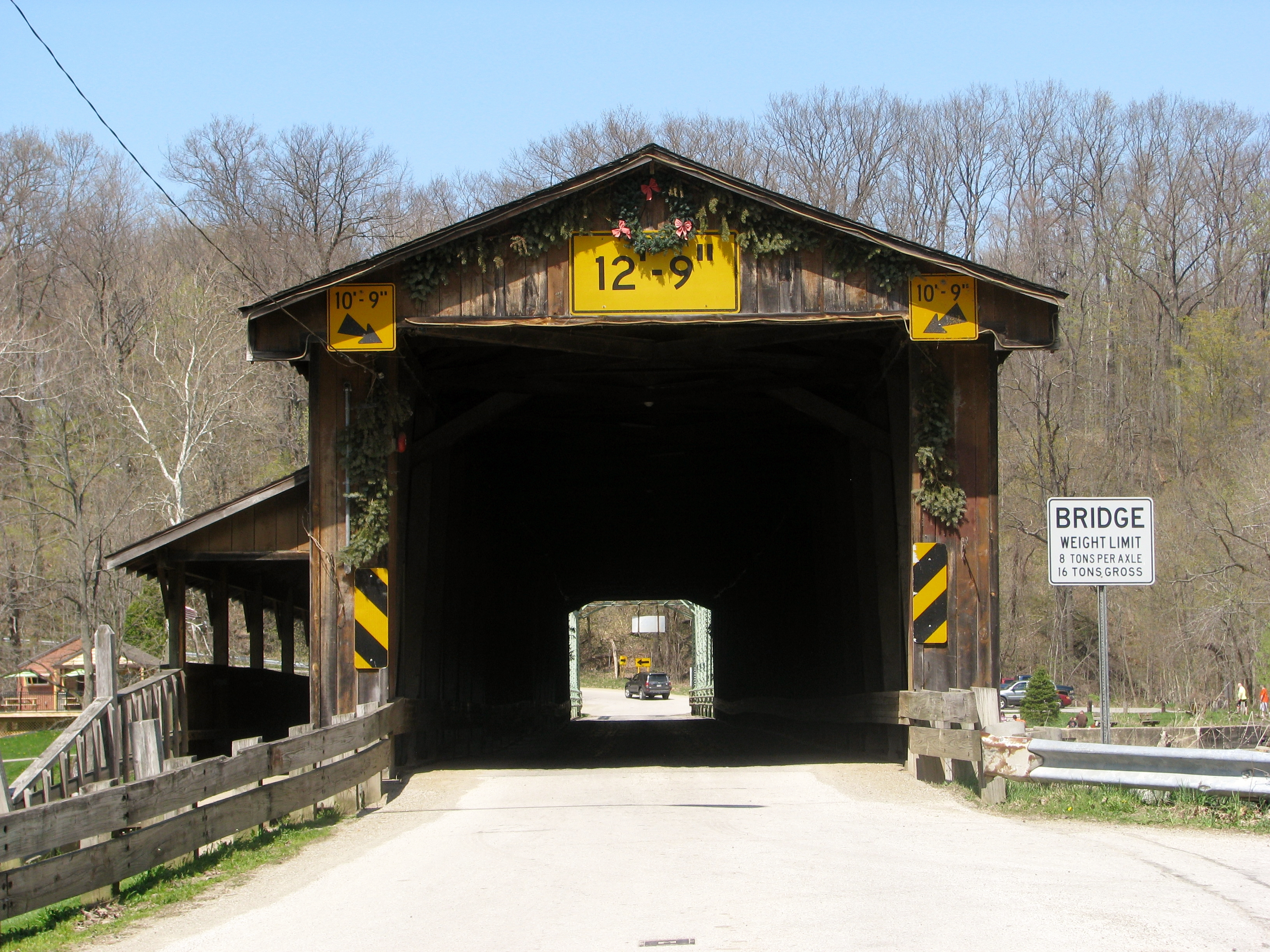

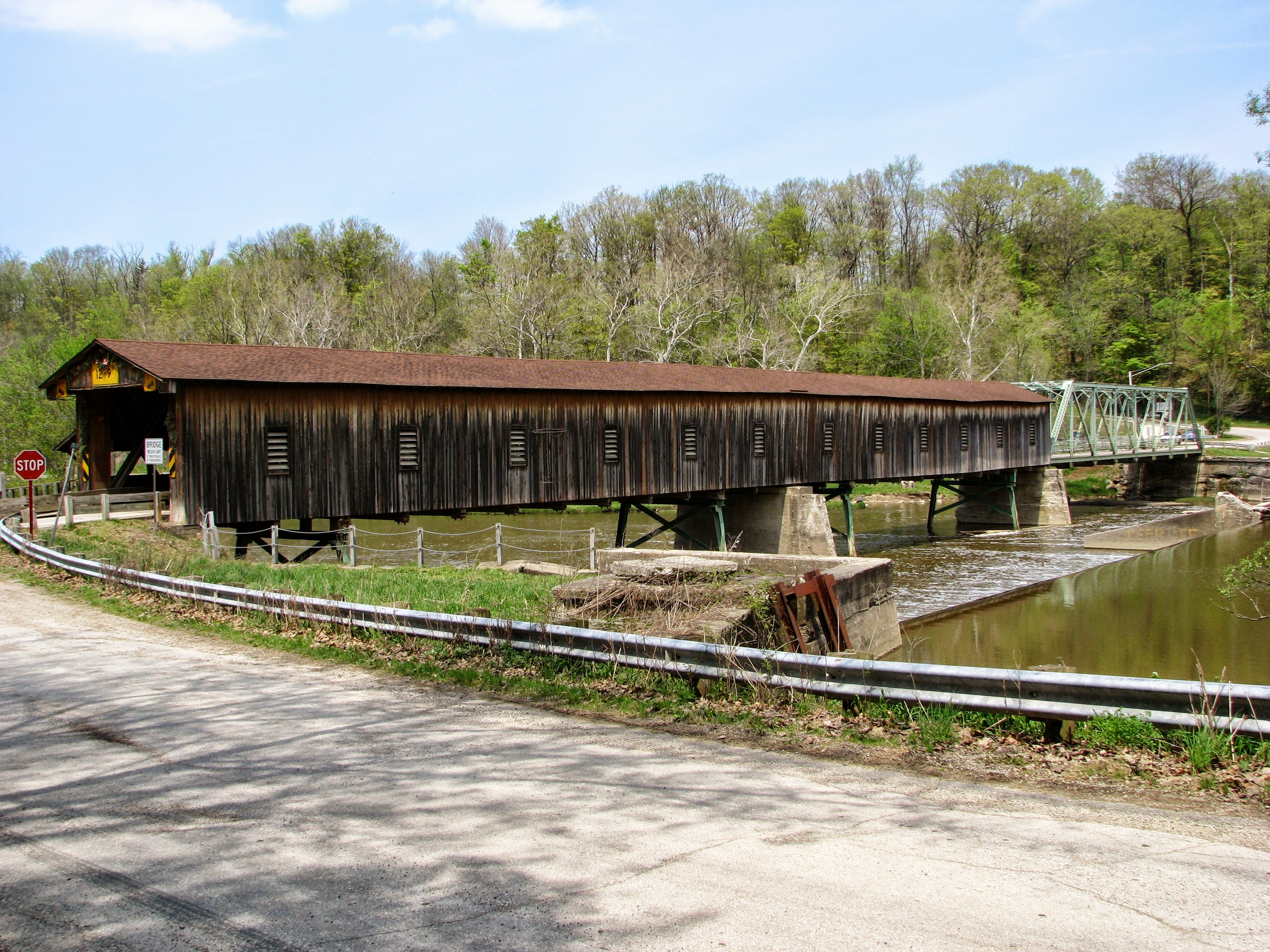

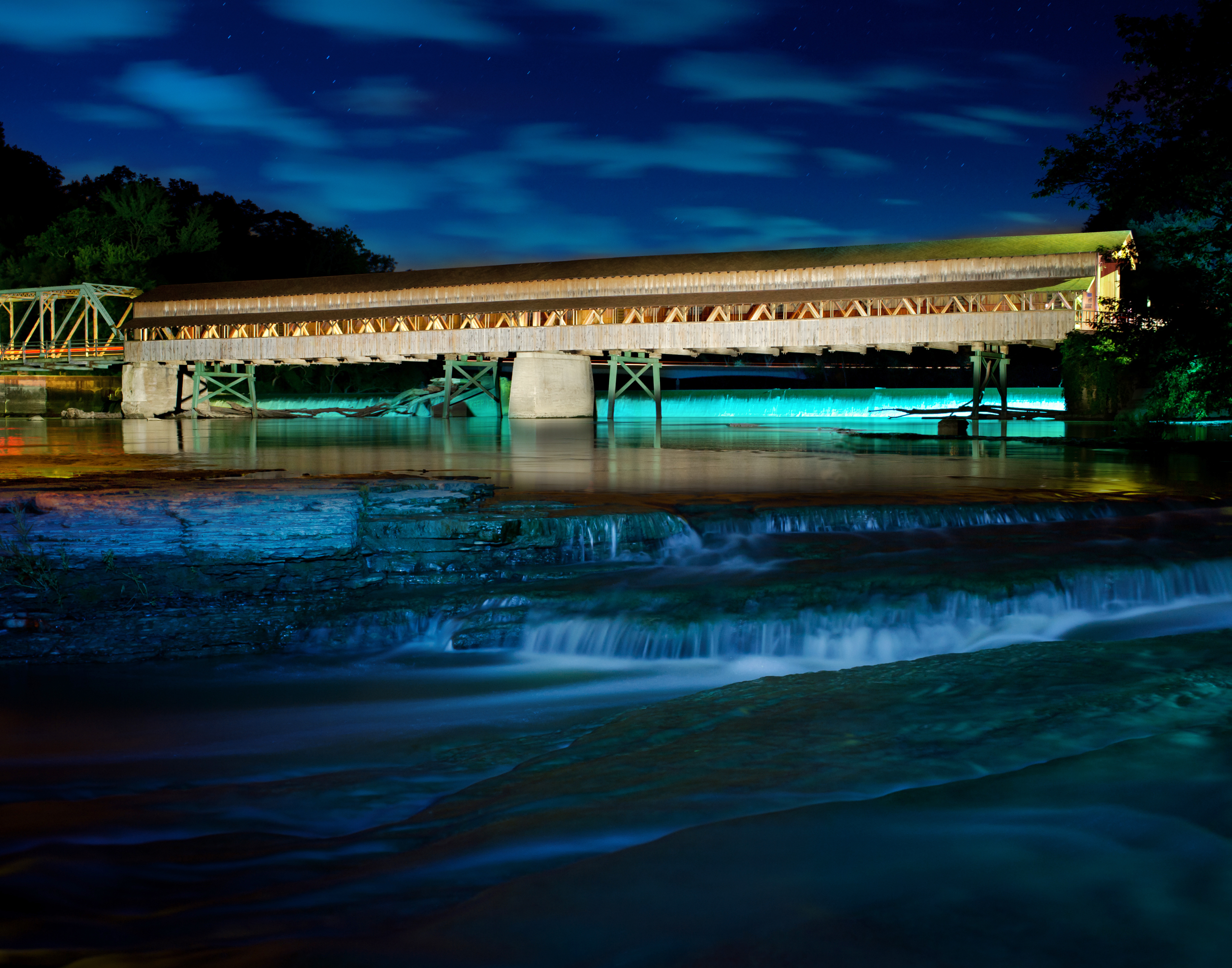

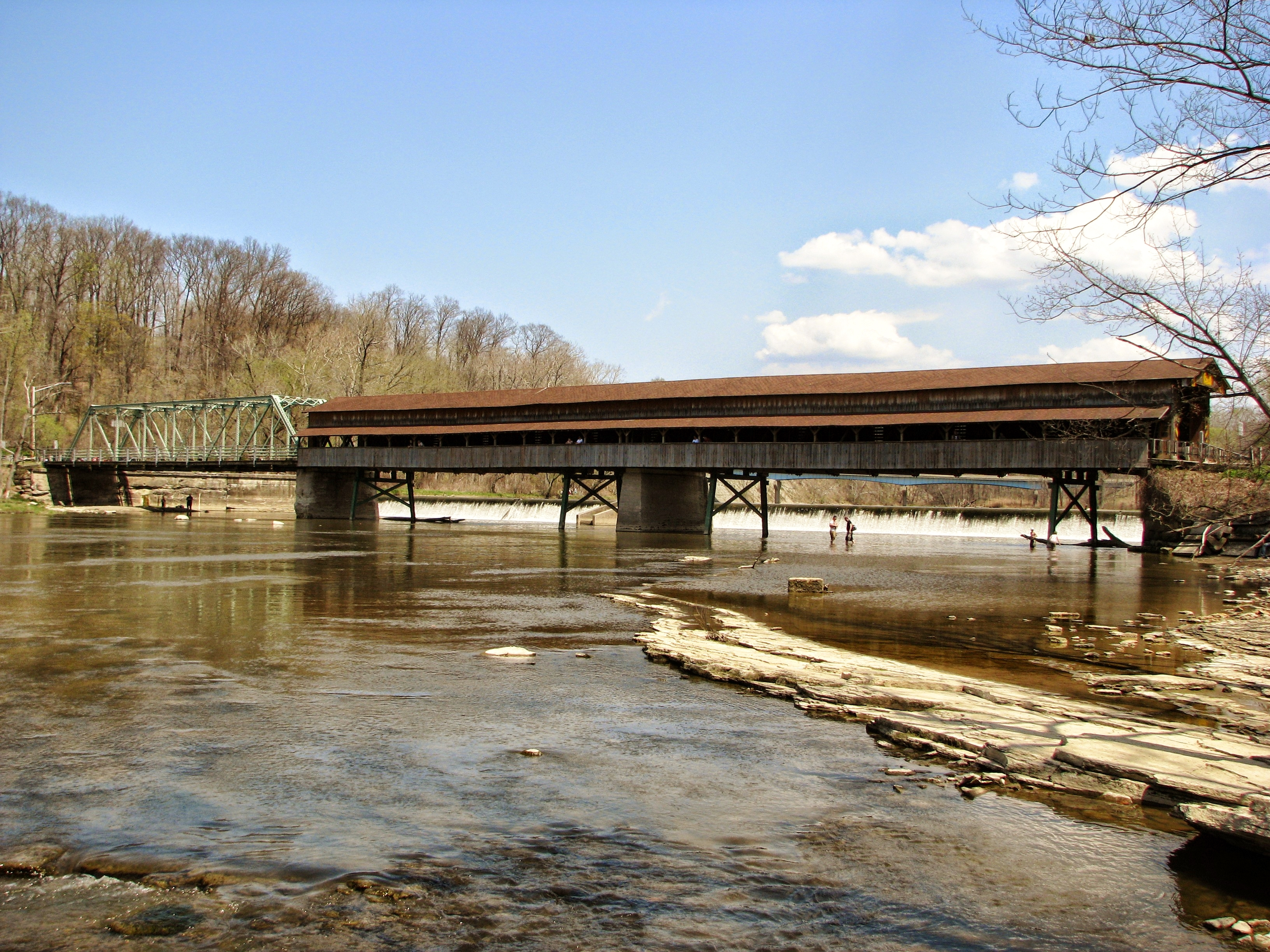

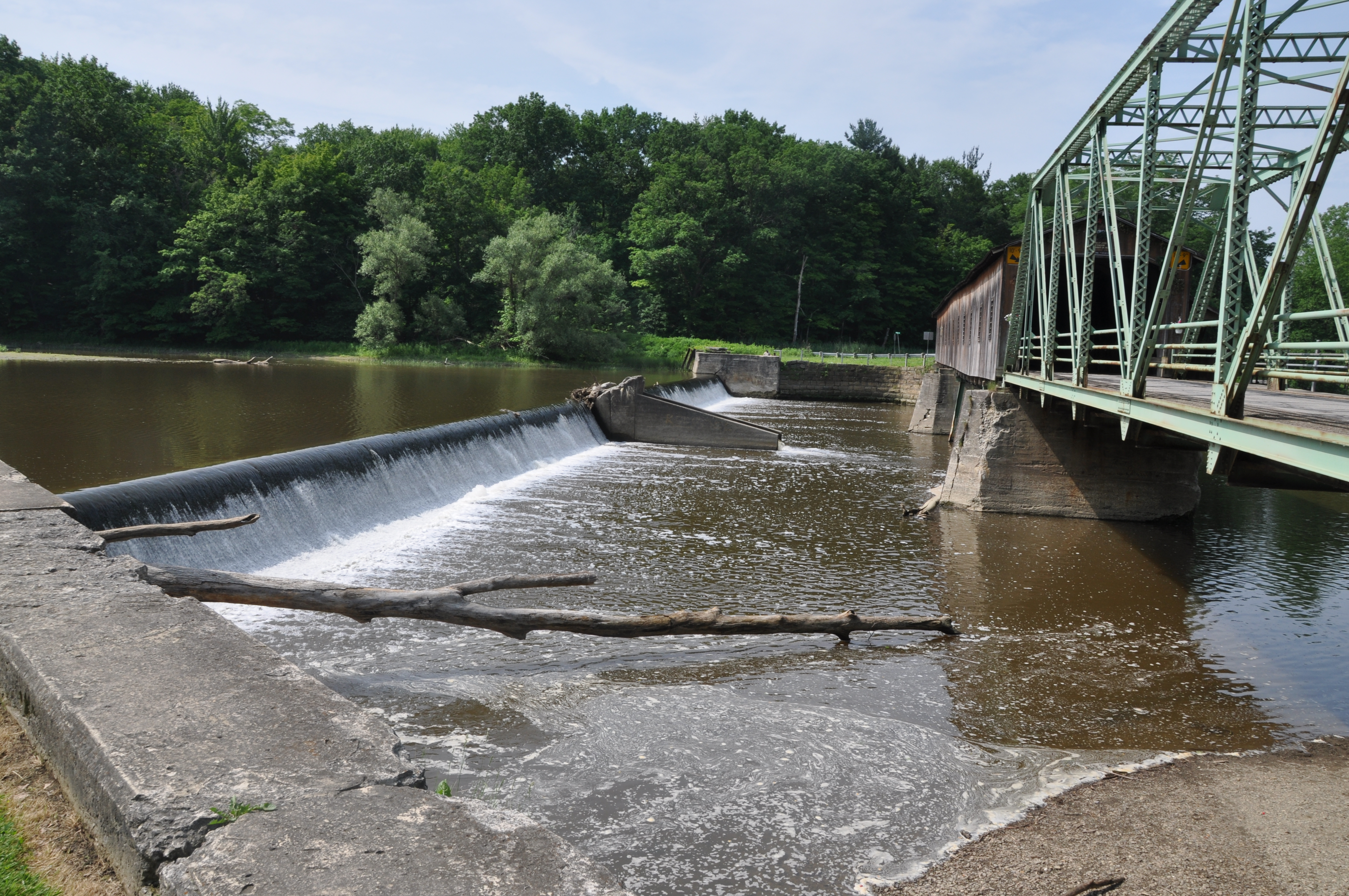

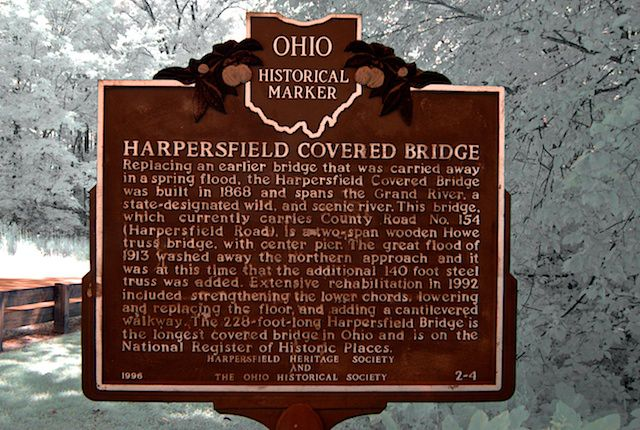
Ohio Historical Marker

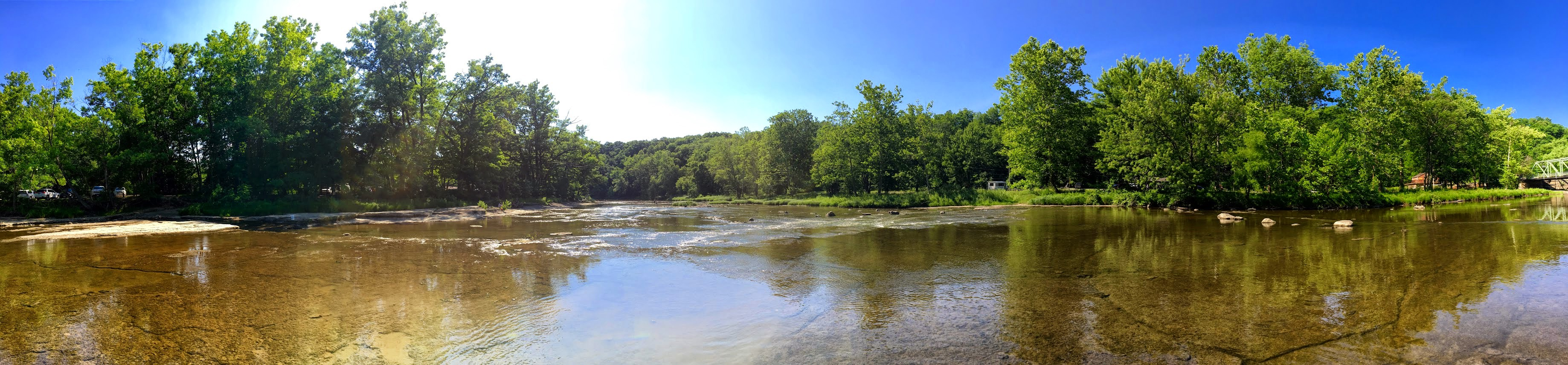
A panoramic view of Grand River in June 2016.

== See also ==
- List of Ashtabula County covered bridges
