= Alex McColl =

American baseball player (1894-1991)

- Pitcher
- Born: March 29, 1894; Eagleville, Ohio, U.S.
- Died: February 6, 1991 (aged 96); Kingsville, Ohio, U.S.
- Batted: Both Threw: Right

MLB debut
- August 29, 1933, for the Washington Senators

Last MLB appearance
- September 29, 1934, for the Washington Senators

MLB statistics
- Win–loss record: 4–4
- Earned run average: 3.70
- Strikeouts: 34
- Stats at Baseball Reference

Teams
- Washington Senators (1933–1934)

Alexander Boyd "Red" McColl (March 29, 1894 – February 6, 1991) was an American professional baseball pitcher who appeared in 46 games in Major League Baseball for the Washington Senators in 1933 and 1934. The native of Eagleville, Ohio, pitched in Organized Baseball for 26 years, from 1915 to 1925 and 1927–1941. McColl made his MLB debut at the age of 39, one of eight pitchers in MLB history to debut at 39 or older. A right-hander, McColl was listed as 6 feet 1 inch (1.85 m) tall and 178 pounds (81 kg).

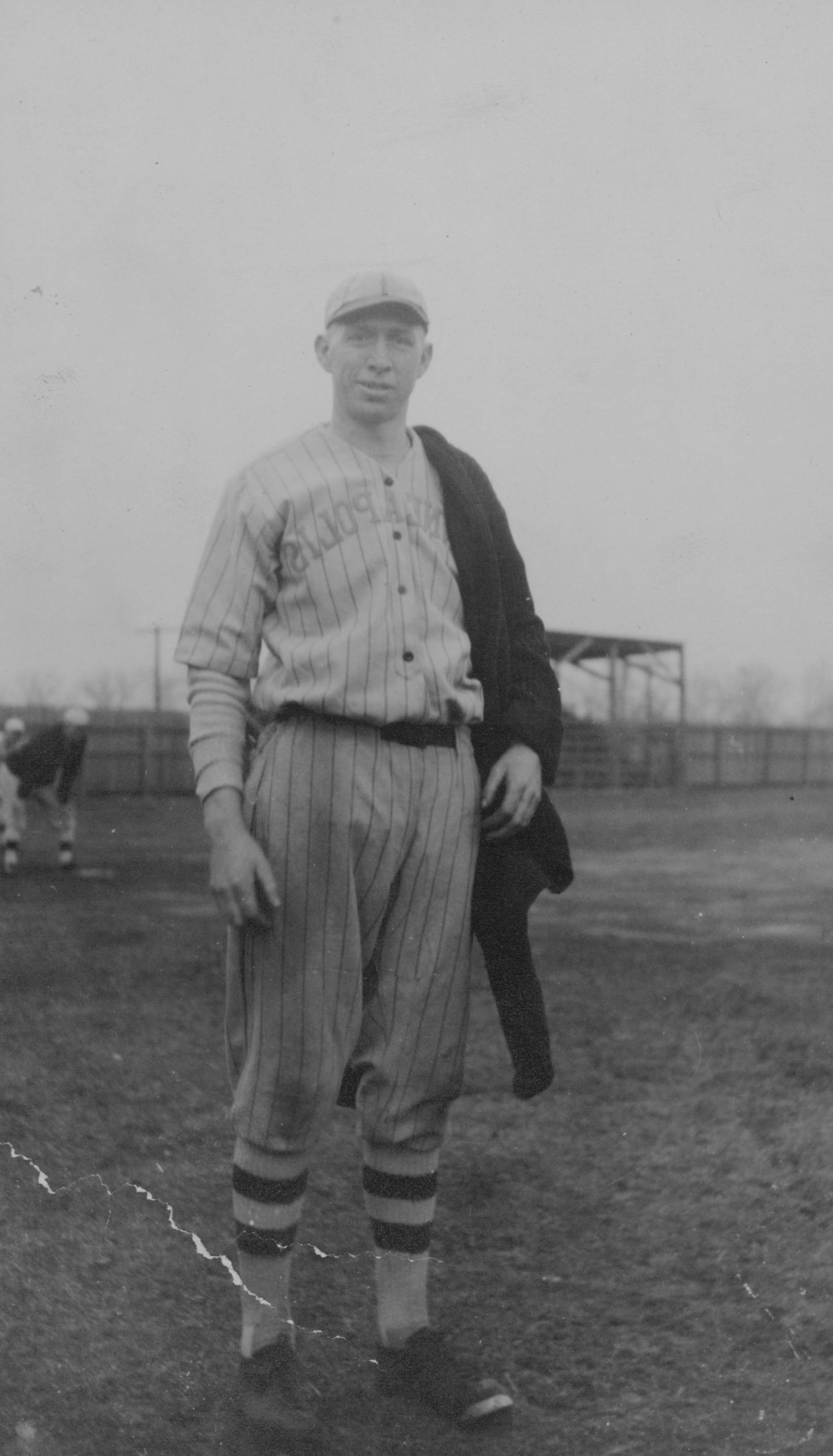
"Red" McColl with the minor league Minneapolis Millers, 1920s

McColl had played for 18 seasons in the minor leagues before making his major league debut with pennant-bound Washington on August 29, 1933 by throwing 31/3 innings of shutout relief against the Cleveland Indians. In his fifth career game, McColl recorded two perfect innings in Game 2 of the 1933 World Series against the New York Giants, retiring Hall of Famers Mel Ott and Travis Jackson in the process.

His 46 American League games pitched included three starts. He posted a 4–4 won–lost record and a 3.70 earned run average, with two complete games and three saves. In 119 innings pitched, he allowed 142 hits and 43 bases on balls, and registered 34 strikeouts.

In 862 minor-league games and 5,262 innings pitched, McColl went 332–263 (3.42) over his long career, and served as a player-manager in the Washington organization.
