= New Lyme Township, Ashtabula County, Ohio =

Township in Ohio, US

- Township
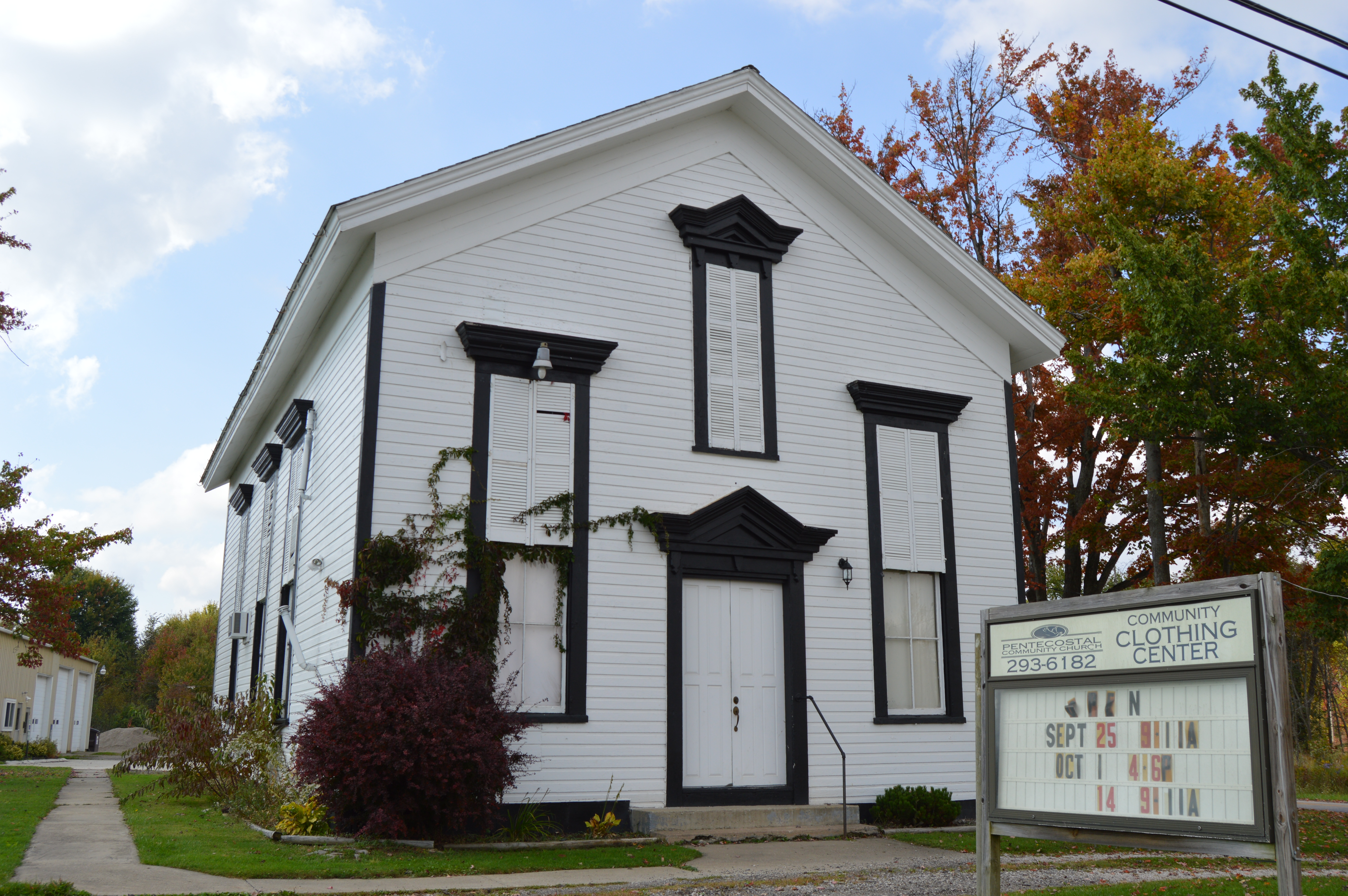
- New Lyme Town Hall

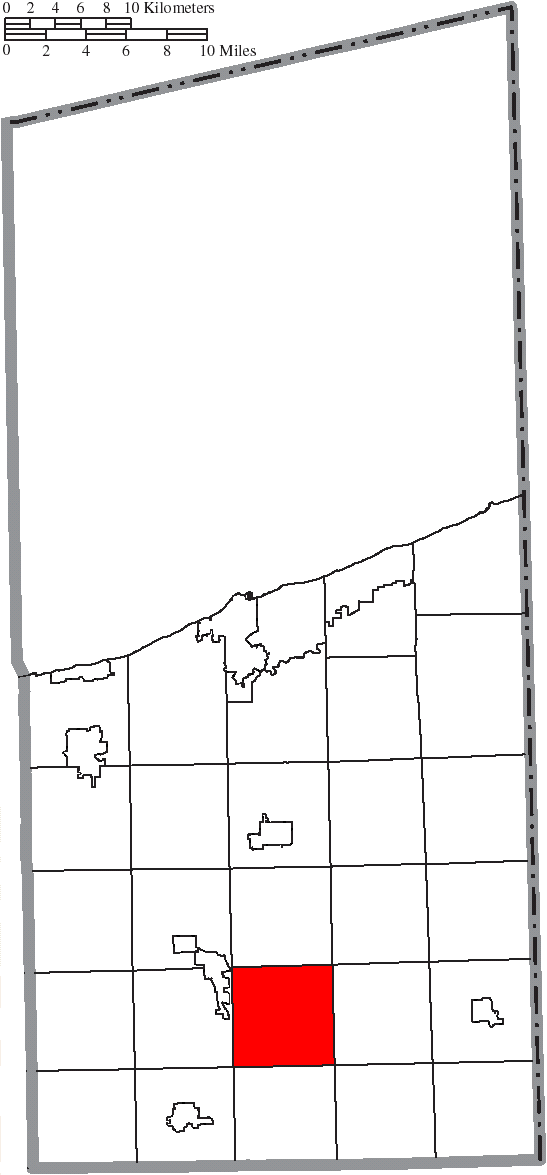
- Location of New Lyme Township in Ashtabula County
- Coordinates: 41°36′9″N 80°46′21″W
- Country: United States
- State: Ohio
- County: Ashtabula

Area
  - Total: 24.9 sq mi (64.5 km^{2})
  - Land: 24.9 sq mi (64.4 km^{2})
  - Water: 0.039 sq mi (0.1 km^{2})
- Elevation: 981 ft (299 m)

Population (2020)
  - Total: 1,015
  - Density: 45/sq mi (17.3/km^{2})
- Time zone: UTC-5 (Eastern (EST))
  - Summer (DST): UTC-4 (EDT)
- ZIP codes: 44047, 44085
- Area code: 440
- FIPS code: 39-54964
- GNIS feature ID: 1085734
- Website: www.newlymeoh.com

New Lyme Township is one of the twenty-seven townships of Ashtabula County, Ohio, United States. The 2020 census found 1,015 people in the township.

== Geography ==
Located in the southern part of the county, it borders the following townships:

- Lenox Township - north
- Dorset Township - northeast corner
- Cherry Valley Township - east
- Wayne Township - southeast corner
- Colebrook Township - south
- Orwell Township - southwest corner
- Rome Township - west
- Morgan Township - northwest corner

No municipalities are located in New Lyme Township.

== Name and history ==
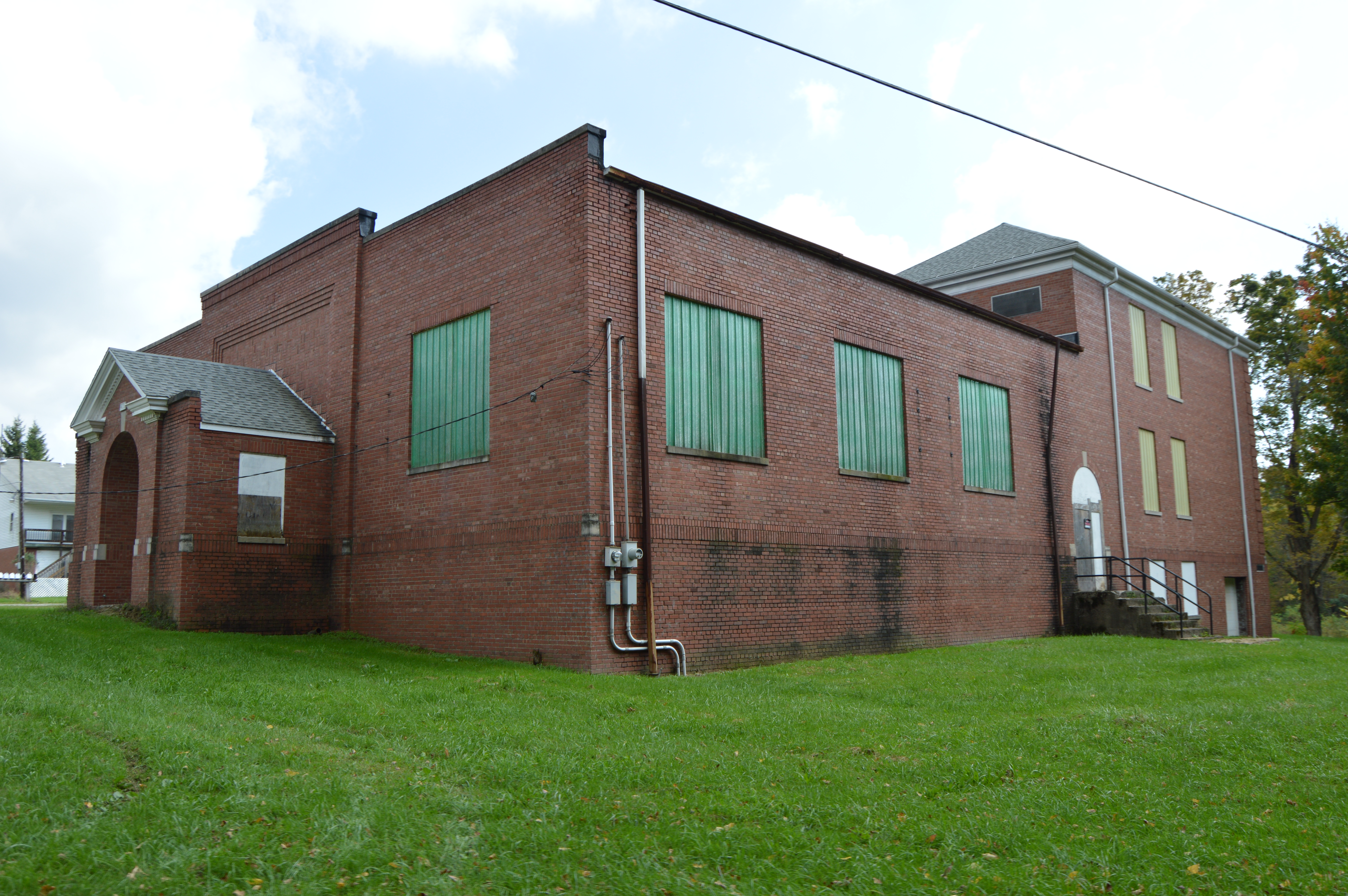
New Lyme Institute (1879-1924)

It is the only New Lyme Township statewide.

The township was first settled by former Connecticut resident Joel Owen in 1803.

The township was originally known as Lebanon until 1825, when it was renamed for Lyme, Connecticut, the former home of many of its early settlers.

== Government ==
The township is governed by a three-member board of trustees, who are elected in November of odd-numbered years to a four-year term beginning on the following January 1. Two are elected in the year after the presidential election and one is elected in the year before it. There is also an elected township fiscal officer, who serves a four-year term beginning on April 1 of the year after the election, which is held in November of the year before the presidential election. Vacancies in the fiscal officership or on the board of trustees are filled by the remaining trustees. Currently, the board is composed of chairman Christopher Zaebst and members William Edelman and Lee Fetters.
