= Peck–Bowen House =

Historic house in Massachusetts, United States

- U.S. National Register of Historic Places
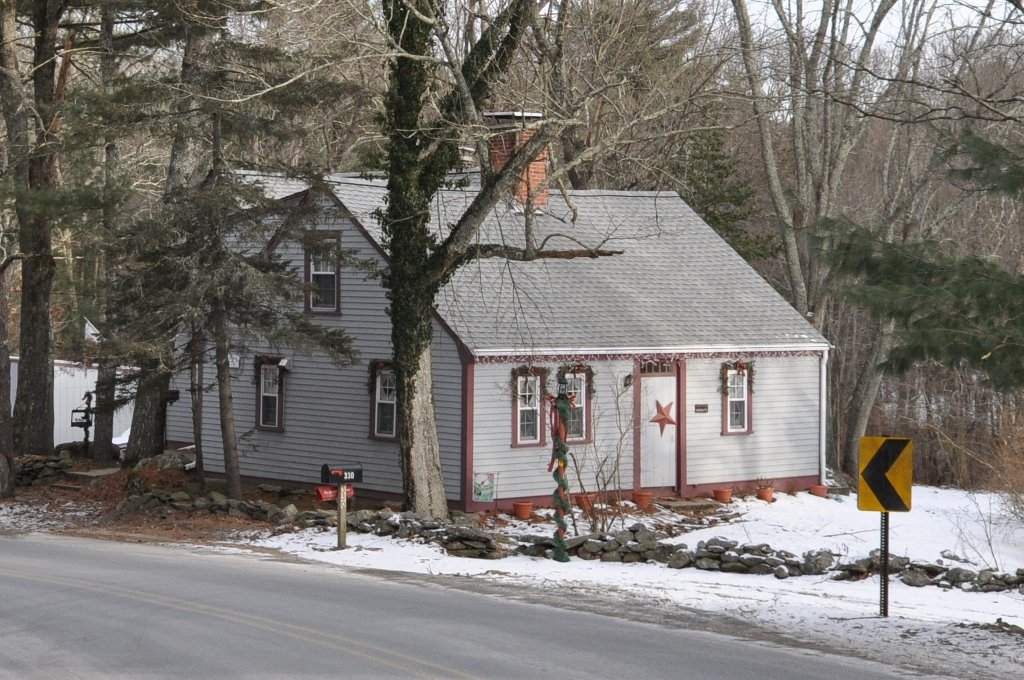

- Location within Massachusetts Location within the United States
- Location: 330 Fairview Ave., Rehoboth, Massachusetts
- Coordinates: 41°52′20″N 71°13′42″W
- Built: c. 1770-1780
- Architectural style: Georgian, Federal
- MPS: Rehoboth MRA
- NRHP reference No.: 83000700
- Added to NRHP: June 6, 1983

The Peck–Bowen House is a historic house at 330 Fairview Avenue in Rehoboth, Massachusetts.

== Description and history ==
It is a modest 1+1/2-story, Cape style cottage, five bays wide, with a side gable roof and central chimney. An ell, added around 1910, extends to the rear. The interior retains original features, including beaded chair rails and fireplace mantels. The house was built c. 1770–80, though its early ownership is uncertain. It may have belonged to members of the Peck family, who operated an iron forge and grist mill nearby.

The house was listed on the National Register of Historic Places on June 6, 1983.

== See also ==
- National Register of Historic Places listings in Bristol County, Massachusetts
