= Eagleville, Ashtabula County, Ohio =

Unincorporated community in Ohio, U.S.

Coordinates: 41°43′00″N 80°50′09″W

Eagleville is an unincorporated community in Ashtabula County, in the U.S. state of Ohio.

== History ==
A post office called Eagleville was established in 1831, and remained in operation until 1935.

The L.W. Peck House was built in the 1840s, and is now listed on the National Register of Historic Places.

== Notable people ==
Ed Cushman, an American Major League Baseball pitcher, was born at Eagleville in 1852. Alex McColl, a Major League Baseball pitcher was born at Eagleville in 1894.
