= Windsor Township, Ashtabula County, Ohio =

Township in Ohio, US

- Township
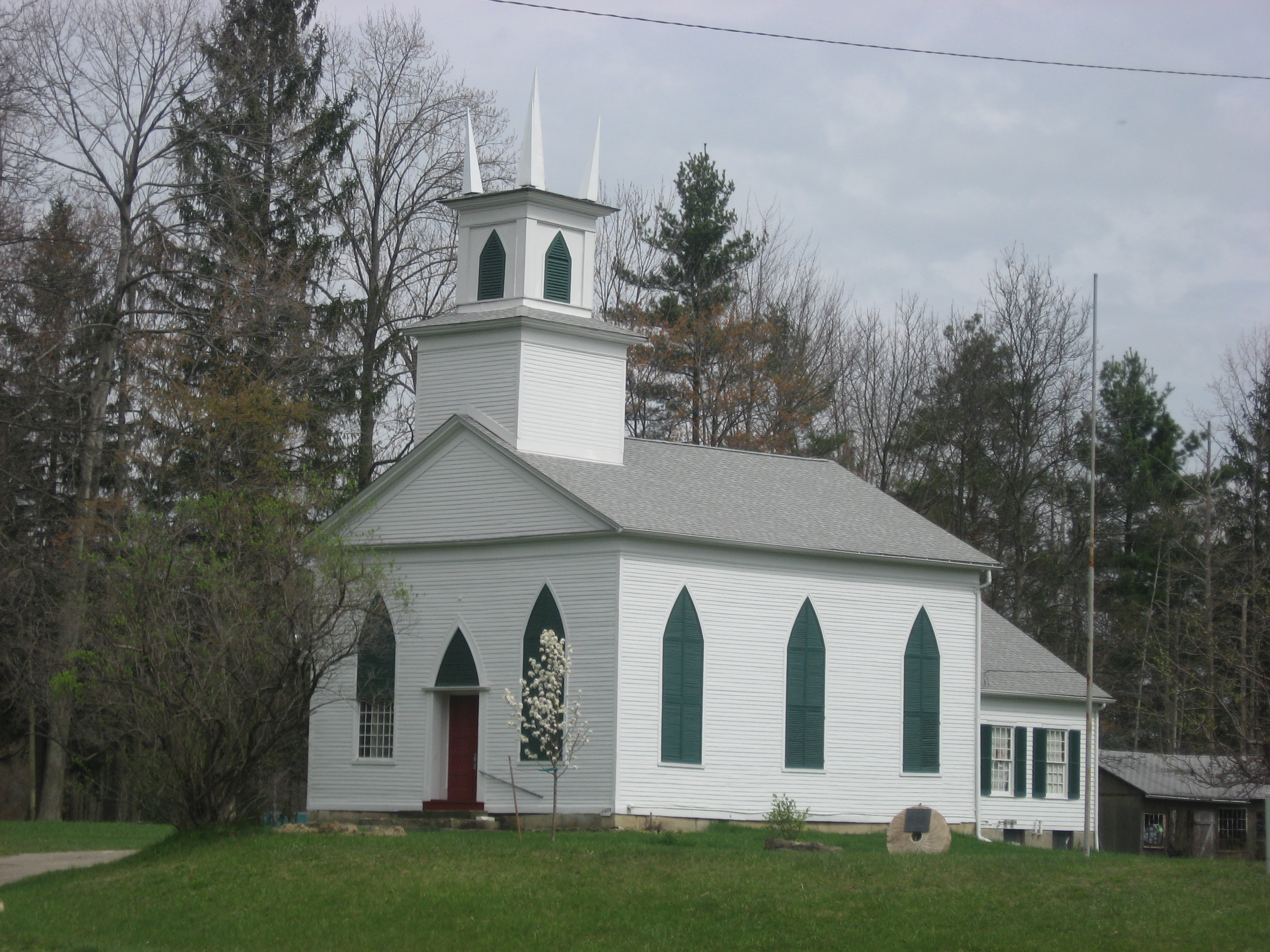
- Windsor Mills Christ Church Episcopal, a historic site in the township

- Seal

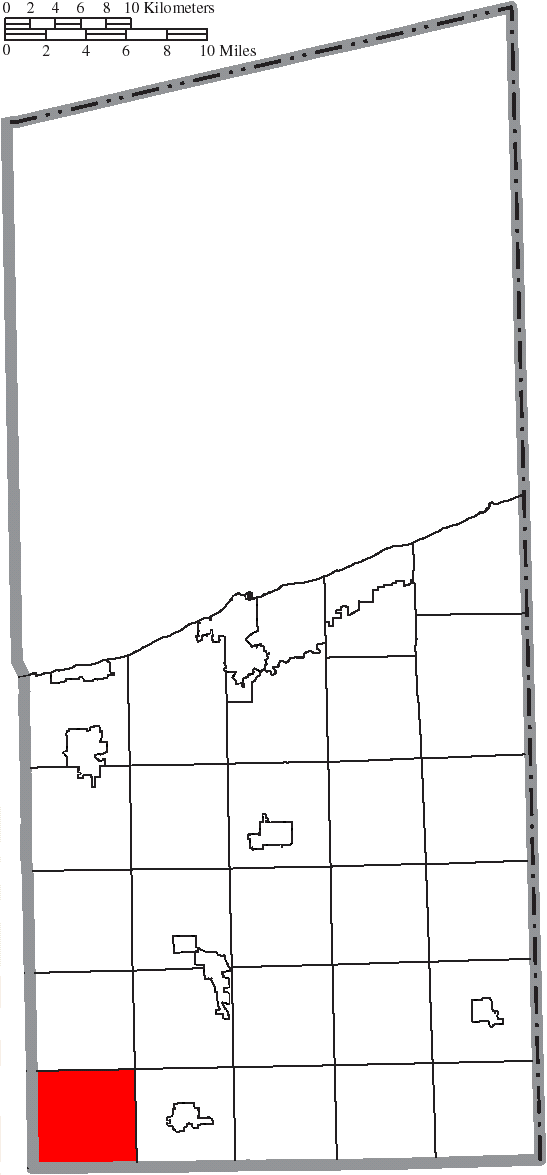
- Location of Windsor Township in Ashtabula County
- Coordinates: 41°32′5″N 80°56′45″W
- Country: United States
- State: Ohio
- County: Ashtabula

Area
  - Total: 24.7 sq mi (64.0 km^{2})
  - Land: 24.7 sq mi (63.9 km^{2})
  - Water: 0.039 sq mi (0.1 km^{2})
- Elevation: 1,001 ft (305 m)

Population (2020)
  - Total: 2,659
  - Density: 108/sq mi (41.6/km^{2})
- Time zone: UTC-5 (Eastern (EST))
  - Summer (DST): UTC-4 (EDT)
- ZIP code: 44099
- Area code: 440
- FIPS code: 39-85988
- GNIS feature ID: 1085747
- Website: windsortownship.org

Historical population
Census	Pop.	Note	%±
1990	1,481		—
2000	1,932		30.5%
2010	2,279		18.0%
2020	2,659		16.7%
2024 (est.)	2,732		2.7%
U.S. Census:

Windsor Township is one of the twenty-seven townships of Ashtabula County, Ohio, United States. The 2020 census found 2,659 people in the township.

== Geography ==
Located in the southwestern corner of the county, it borders the following townships:

- Hartsgrove Township - north
- Rome Township - northeast corner
- Orwell Township - east
- Bloomfield Township, Trumbull County - southeast corner
- Mesopotamia Township, Trumbull County - south
- Middlefield Township, Geauga County - southwest corner
- Huntsburg Township, Geauga County - west
- Montville Township, Geauga County - northwest corner

No municipalities are located in Windsor Township, although the unincorporated community of Windsor lies in the township's east.

== Name and history ==
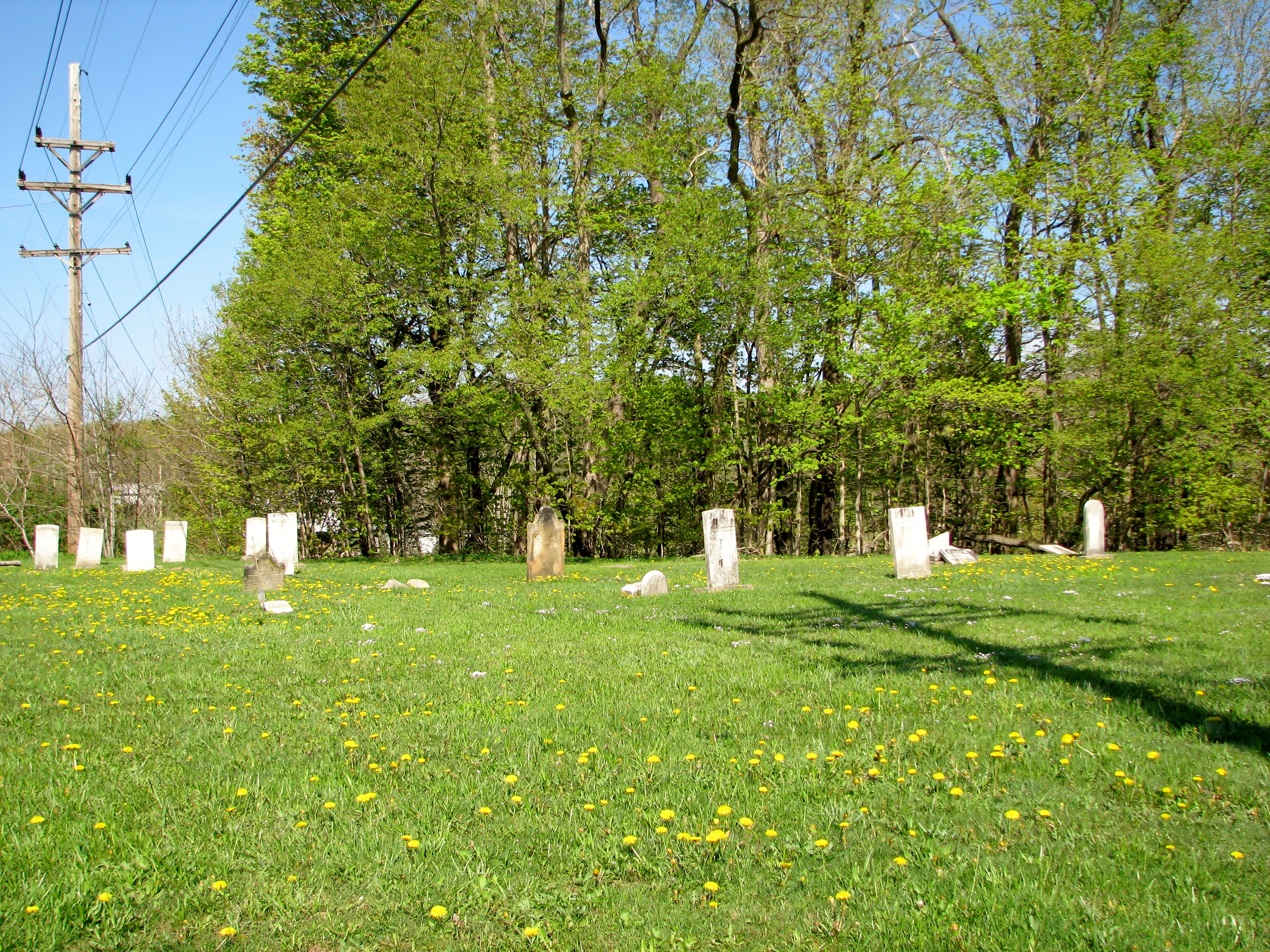
Windsor Mills Cemetery

Statewide, other Windsor Townships are located in Lawrence and Morgan counties.

The earliest settler in Windsor Township was George Phelps, who came to the area from Connecticut in 1799.

== Government ==
The township is governed by a three-member board of trustees, who are elected in November of odd-numbered years to a four-year term beginning on the following January 1. Two are elected in the year after the presidential election and one is elected in the year before it. There is also an elected township fiscal officer, who serves a four-year term beginning on April 1 of the year after the election, which is held in November of the year before the presidential election. Vacancies in the fiscal officership or on the board of trustees are filled by the remaining trustees. Currently, the board is composed of chairman Jeffrey Merritt and members Bonnie Plizga and Robert Slusher.
