= Mentor (disambiguation) =

Mentorship is the developmental relationship between a more experienced mentor and a less experienced partner referred to as a protégé or mentee.

Mentor, Mentors, or The Mentor may also refer to:

== Greek mythology ==
- Mentor (mythology), any of several Greek mythological characters, including:
  - Mentor (Odyssey), son of Alcimus

== People ==
- Mentor of Rhodes, a Greek mercenary
- Mentor Arifaj, Kosovo-Albanian engineer and politician
- Mentor Dotson (born c. 1837–?), African American politician
- Mentor Graham (1800–1886), a U.S. teacher
- Mentor Huebner (1917–2001), a U.S. film illustrator
- Mentor Mazrekaj (born 1989), an Albanian soccer player
- Mentor Përmeti (1920–2015), an Albanian agronomist
- Mentor Williams (1946–2016), a U.S. musician
- Mentor Xhemali (1926–1992), an Albanian singer
- Mentor Zhdrella (born 1988), a Kosovar soccer player
- Mentor Zhubi (born 1984), a Swedish futsal player
- Leslie Mentor (born 1938), Venezuelan runner
- "The Mentor", the pseudonym of Loyd Blankenship, a famous hacker

== Places ==
- 3451 Mentor, Jovian asteroid

=== United States ===
- Mentor, Indiana
- Mentor, Kansas
- Mentor, Kentucky
- Mentor, Minnesota
- Mentor, Missouri
- Mentor, Ohio, the largest city with this name
- Mentor, Washington
- Mentor, West Virginia
- Mentor, Wisconsin
- Mentor Township (disambiguation)
  - Mentor Township, Cheboygan County, Michigan
  - Mentor Township, Oscoda County, Michigan
- Mentor-on-the-Lake, Ohio
- Mentor Avenue, Lake County, Ohio

==== Facilities and structures ====
- Mentor station, a rail station in Mentor, Ohio
- Mentor High School, Mentor, Ohio
- Mentor Court, a bungalow court in Pasadena, California

== Art, entertainment, and media ==
=== Fictional characters ===
- Mentor (comics), several characters from comics
- Mentor (A'lars), a Marvel Comics character
- Mentor, the guardian of Billy Batson/Captain Marvel in Shazam! (TV series)
- Mentor of Arisia, an extraterrestrial force in E. E. "Doc" Smith's Lensman series; see Children of the Lens
- An alien species in the Doctor Who universe

=== Other art, entertainment, and media ===
- Mentors (band), an American heavy metal band
- Mentor (film), a 2006 film starring Rutger Hauer
- Mentors (TV series), 1998 Canadian children's fantasy science fiction TV show
- The Mentor (TV series), 2018 Australian reality TV show
- The Mentor (webisodes), 2010 U.S. web extras for the U.S. version of The Office
- Mentor, a magazine for gay men published by the BLK organization

== Computing and technology ==
- Mentor, a line of minicomputers running the Pick operating system and produced by Applied Digital Data Systems in the 1980s
- MENTOR routing algorithm, a routing algorithm for mesh networks topology

== Enterprises and organizations ==
- MENTOR, a nonprofit organization that promotes mentorship
- Mentor (company), a supplier of surgical aesthetics products
- Mentor Books, an imprint of Christian Focus Publications
- Mentor Books, an imprint of New American Library
- Mentor Foundation, an international youth development NGO
- Mentor Dynamics, a Canadian manufacturer of lifting systems
- Mentor Graphics, a company providing electronic design automation solutions
- Mentor Public Schools, Mentor, Ohio, USA

== Other uses ==
- Mentor (satellite), a type of U.S. reconnaissance satellite
- Mentor (ship), several ships by the name
- Miles Mentor, a 1930s British trainer aircraft
- Beechcraft T-34 Mentor, a trainer plane

== See also ==
- Mentorship
- Mentore Maggini (1890–1941), Italian astronomer
- The Mentors Journal
