= Concord Township, Lake County, Ohio =

Township in Ohio, US

- Township
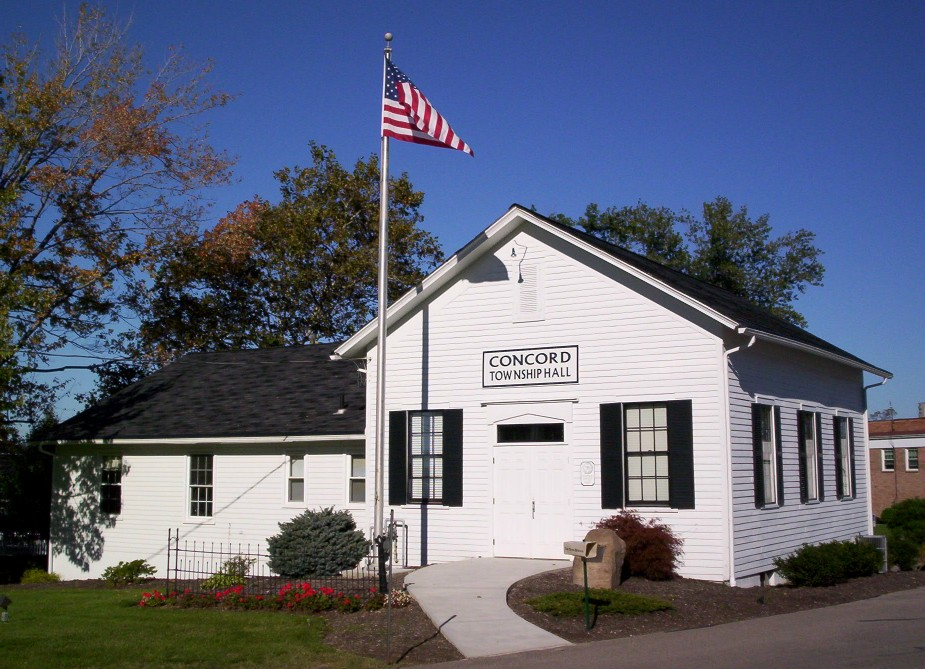
- Concord Township Hall

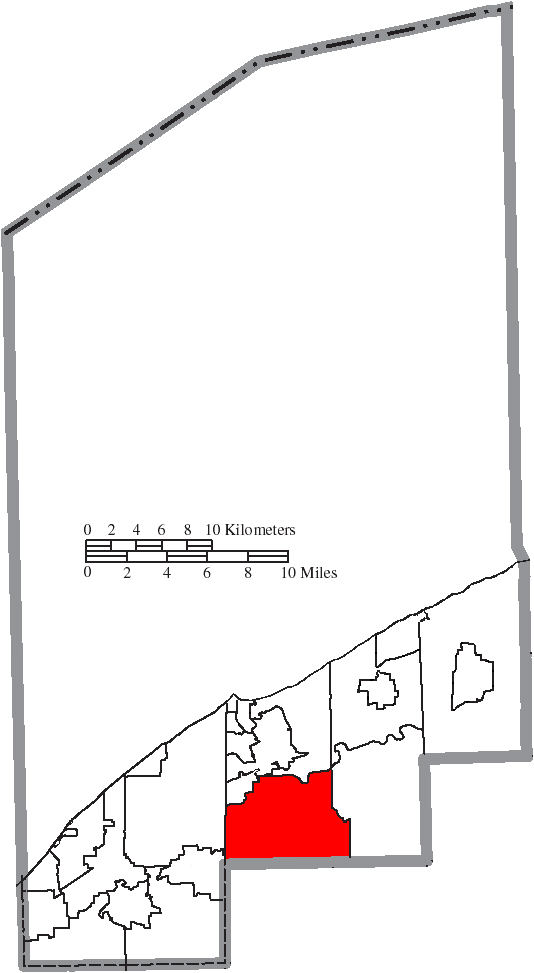
- Location in Lake County
- Coordinates: 41°40′18″N 81°15′3″W
- Country: United States
- State: Ohio
- County: Lake

Area
  - Total: 23.17 sq mi (60.00 km^{2})
  - Land: 23.03 sq mi (59.65 km^{2})
  - Water: 0.14 sq mi (0.35 km^{2})
- Elevation: 719 ft (219 m)

Population (2020)
  - Total: 19,254
  - Density: 836.0/sq mi (322.8/km^{2})
- Time zone: UTC-5 (Eastern (EST))
  - Summer (DST): UTC-4 (EDT)
- ZIP codes: 44060, 44077
- Area code: 440
- FIPS code: 39-18196
- GNIS feature ID: 1086415
- Website: Township website

Concord Township is one of the five townships of Lake County, Ohio, United States. As of the 2020 census, the population was 19,254. Lake County is part of the Cleveland-Elyria, OH Metropolitan Statistical Area.

== Geography ==
Located in the center of the county, it borders the following townships and municipalities:

- Painesville Township - north
- Perry Township - northeast corner
- LeRoy Township - east
- Hambden Township, Geauga County - southeast
- Chardon Township, Geauga County - south
- Kirtland Hills - southwest
- Mentor - west
- Painesville - northwest

According to the U.S. Census Bureau, Concord Township has an area of 23.2 square miles (60.0 km^{2}), of which 23.0 square miles (59.6 km^{2}) are land and 0.2 square miles (0.4 km^{2}), or 0.58%, are water.

No municipalities are located in Concord Township.

The historical location of the unincorporated settlement of Concord is at the north end of Ohio State Route 608 where it meets Ravenna Road/County Highway 360 (former State Route 44), though most current development in the immediate area is located nearby at the intersection of current State Route 44 and Interstate 90.

== Name and history ==
Concord Township is included in what is historically referred to as the Connecticut Western Reserve. General Edward Paine (1746–1841), who had served as a captain in the Connecticut militia during the war, arrived in 1800 with a party of 66 settlers. General Paine later represented the region in the territorial legislature of the Northwest Territory.

Concord Township was established in 1822. The township's name commemorates the Battle of Concord in the American Revolutionary War. It is one of seven Concord Townships statewide.

== Demographics ==
The population of Concord Township was 19,254 in the 2020 census. The population distribution is White 93%, Black 0%, Asian 2%, Hispanic 3%, and two or more races 2%. The median income is $115,381 and the per capita income for a family of three is $172,836. The educational attainment level for residents 25 years or older are: High School Graduates 98.3%, Associate Degrees 11.5%, Bachelor's Degrees 26.5%, Post graduate degrees 19.2%

== Government ==
The township is governed by a three-member board of trustees, who are elected in November of odd-numbered years to a four-year term beginning on the following January 1. Two are elected in the year after the presidential election and one is elected in the year before it. There is also an elected township fiscal officer, who serves a four-year term beginning on April 1 of the year after the election, which is held in November of the year before the presidential election. Vacancies in the fiscal officership or on the board of trustees are filled by the remaining trustees. As of 2020, the board members are Carl Dondorfer, Morgan McIntosh, and Amy Lucci, and the fiscal officer is James Teknipp.

== Transportation ==
=== Highways ===
In 2004, the township included approximately 134 miles (216 km) of roadways, nearly all of which are paved. Major transportation routes in or near the township are U.S. Route 20, Ohio State Route 2 and Ohio State Route 84. Interstate 90 passes through Concord Township and is easily accessed via Ohio State Route 44.

=== Mass Transit ===
Laketran operates bus lines throughout Lake County as well as into downtown Cleveland and Cleveland's major medical centers in University Circle.

Laketran has no active stops within Concord Township.

=== Railroads ===
Two major railroads, CSX and Norfolk Southern, pass through the township. Additionally, Amtrak's Lake Shore Limited passes through on the CSX line. However, these trains do not stop in the township. The nearest Amtrak station is 28 miles (45 km) to the southwest in Cleveland.

=== Airports ===
Concord Township is 43 miles (69 km) from Cleveland Hopkins International Airport, Ohio's largest airport.

== Education ==
=== Public Library ===
Morley Library serves both Painesville City, Painesville Township and Concord Township residents and is located in Painesville's 284-acre (115 ha) Historic Downtown District.

=== Public Schools ===
Concord Township is served by the Auburn Career Center, and primarily by the Riverside Local Schools,

A portion of Concord Township is in the Mentor Public Schools district. All of the Mentor school district section of Concord Township is zoned to Hopkins Elementary School. All of the Mentor school district section of Concord Township is zoned to Memorial Middle School. All students in the Mentor school district are zoned to Mentor High School.

=== Private/Independent Schools ===
Hershey Montessori School is an independent Montessori school located in Concord Township. It serves students from two months old through sixth grade. Its seventh through twelfth grade campus is located in nearby Huntsburg, Ohio.

=== Higher Education ===
Lake Erie College, a private liberal arts college enrolling approximately 1,200 students is located in neighboring Painesville. The college offers over 60 undergraduate programs and master's programs. The former Andrews Osborne Academy's Painesville campus became part of Lake Erie College in 2008.

Lakeland Community College, located in nearby Kirtland, Ohio, offers Associate Degree level education to residents of Concord Township and Lake County.

== Health ==
Concord is home to University Hospitals Cleveland Medical Center and Tri-Point Medical Center, a hospital part of Lake Health.

== Businesses ==
The largest employers are the local and county hospital systems, county government, and the public school systems.

=== Concord-Painesville JEDD ===
In 2008, Concord and nearby Painesville formed a Joint Economic Development District to foster economic growth. It consists of a designated area in Concord Township bound by Interstate 90 and State Road 44. The major participants in the JEDD are University Hospitals Cleveland Medical Center, and various real estate development projects. Companies that participate in the JEDD receive tax benefits (based on jobs created), lower cost utilities, tax exemptions for capital improvements, and other benefits. In exchange they agree to a 1.75 percent sales tax which is divided between Concord, Painesville and the JEDD itself.

=== Other Major Companies ===
Avery Dennison - Engineered Films, Regional Industrial and Healthcare Materials - the Concord plant produces extruded plastic materials, including thin sheets and adhesives used for labeling glass packaging and medical adhesives. The company also has research and production facilities in nearby Painesville and other northeast Ohio locations.

De Nora Tech – water treatment and purification, electroplating, electrical storage systems; headquartered in Italy with research and manufacturing plants in Concord Township and nearby Mentor, OH.

Fives Group - CITCO Tools – manufactures precision machinery for engineering glass, steel, plastics and other materials for use in the energy, metallurgy, aerospace, defense, and other industries. The Concord facility manufactures precision cutting tools and abrasives.

Ranpak – patented recyclable packing and packaging systems, headquartered in Concord with plants in Holland and Singapore.

Ricerca Biosciences – A contract research organization working with life-sciences and pharmaceutical companies to develop and test new compounds.

== Notable people ==
- John Albert (born 1989) – ice hockey player
- Evan Bush (born 1986) – soccer player
