= Ryczek =

Ryczek is a Polish surname. Notable people with the surname include:

- Dan Ryczek (born 1949), American football player
- Ervin J. Ryczek (1909–2006), American politician and funeral director
- Paul Ryczek (born 1952), American football player
