= Lake Health =

Hospital system in Ohio, U.S.

Lake Health logo

Lake Health, formerly Lake Hospital System, is a system of hospitals and health care facilities throughout Lake County, Cuyahoga County and Geauga County, Ohio, United States. Lake Health changed its name from Lake Hospital System on June 12, 2009. On April 16, 2021, the Lake Health system became part of University Hospitals.

== Facilities ==
- TriPoint Medical Center – Concord Township 41°39′45″N 81°14′49″W
- LakeWest Medical Center – Willoughby 41°37′32″N 81°25′57″W
- Mentor Medical Campus – Mentor 41°40′57″N 81°18′01″W
- Madison Medical Campus – Madison 41°48′08″N 81°03′51″W
- Chardon Medical Campus – Chardon 41°35′13″N 81°13′13″W
- Willowick Medical Campus – Willowick 41°38′02″N 81°28′40″W
- Tyler Urgent Care Center – Mentor 41°40′46″N 81°21′28″W
- Rehabilitation & Wellness – Mentor 41°40′29″N 81°18′41″W
- Mentor Wellness Campus – Mentor 41°41′35″N 81°19′49″W
- Beachwood Medical Center – Beachwood 40°44'30"N 73°59'21"W

Concord Continuing Care - Concord

=== Former facilities ===
- LakeEast Hospital - Painesville (closed 2009, demolished 2011)
- Painesville Quick Care Center – Painesville 41°43′27″N 81°14′36″W
