= Mentor High School =

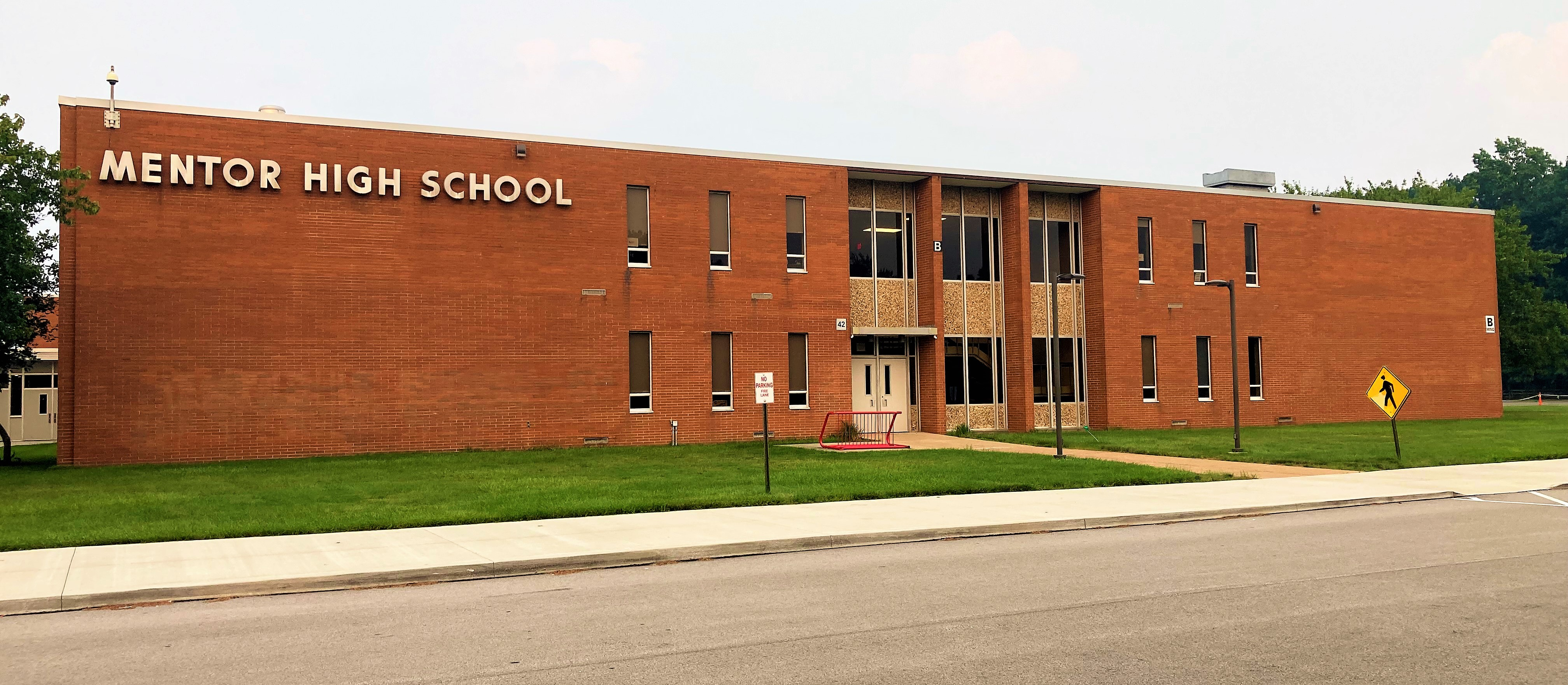

Location
- 6477 Center Street; Mentor, Ohio; Mentor, (Lake County), Ohio 44060; United States; 41°41′40″N 81°20′14″W

Information
- Type: Public, Coeducational high school
- Established: 1923
- Status: Open
- School district: Mentor Exempted Village School District
- Superintendent: Craig Heath
- Principal: John Fullerman
- Faculty: 140 certified staff members
- Teaching staff: 113.16 (FTE)
- Grades: 9–12
- Enrollment: 2,318 (2023-2024)
  - Grade 9: 526
  - Grade 10: 547
  - Grade 11: 601
  - Grade 12: 656
- Student to teacher ratio: 20.48
- Colors: Scarlet and Gray
- Fight song: Across the Field
- Athletics: Boys Baseball; Boys Basketball; Girls Basketball; Bowling; Cheerleading; Boys Cross Country; Girls Cross Country; Girls Fastpitch; Football; Boys Golf; Girls Golf; Gymnastics; Ice hockey Boys Lacrosse; Girls Lacrosse; Boys Rugby; Girls Rugby; Boys Soccer; Girls Soccer; Swimming/Diving Team; Boys Tennis; Girls Tennis; Boys Track & Field; Girls Track & Field; Volleyball; Wrestling
- Athletics conference: Greater Cleveland Conference
- Mascot: The Fighting Cardinal
- Nickname: The Mentor Cards
- Team name: The Fighting Cardinals
- Accreditation: North Central Association of Colleges and Schools
- Website: mentorhigh.mentorschools.net

Mentor High School is a public high school located in Mentor, Ohio, United States. It is the only high school in the Mentor Exempted Village School District (informally, "Mentor Schools"). At one time, it was the largest high school in Ohio based on single building enrollment. For the 2008–2009 school year, it shifted from a three-year school (grades 10–12) to a four-year high school (grades 9–12), serving approximately 2,700 students. Mentor High School educates students from Mentor, Mentor-on-the-Lake, and parts of Kirtland Hills and Concord Township in Lake County, Ohio. Both middle schools from the Mentor Exempted Village School district, Memorial Middle School and Shore Middle School, feed into Mentor High School. The third middle school, Ridge Middle School, closed before the 2018–2019 school year had commenced, and has since been repurposed as an elementary school.

== Attendance area ==
It serves Mentor, Mentor-on-the-Lake, a portion of Kirtland Hills, a portion of Concord Township, and a portion of Chardon Township.

== Academics ==
=== Ohio Department of Education ratings ===
Mentor High School received ratings of excellent from the Ohio Department of Education from the 2003–2004 school year through the 2011–2012 school year. Since the 2011–2012 school year, the Ohio Department of Education has been constructing a new statewide evaluation model and has not released overall building ratings.

=== National Merit Scholars ===
Mentor High School continues to see an increase in student achievement of National Merit recognition.

- 2016-2017 School Year; 7 Finalists, 10 Commended Students
- 2015-2016 School Year; 4 Finalists, 1 Semifinalist, 11 Commended Students
- 2014-2015 School Year; 2 Finalists, 3 Commended Students
- 2013-2014 School Year; 2 Finalists, 1 Commended Student

=== Independent rankings ===
Mentor High School has received the following independent rankings.

- 2026 US News Public High School Rankings: Bronze Medal #113 in Ohio
- 2016 Niche Public High School Rankings: #149 in Ohio

== Extracurricular activities ==
=== Band ===
There are four concert bands at Mentor High School. These include Freshman Band, Grey Band, Scarlet Band, and Wind Ensemble, at increasing levels of skill. All four bands compete in OMEA contests.

=== Fighting Cardinal Marching Band ===
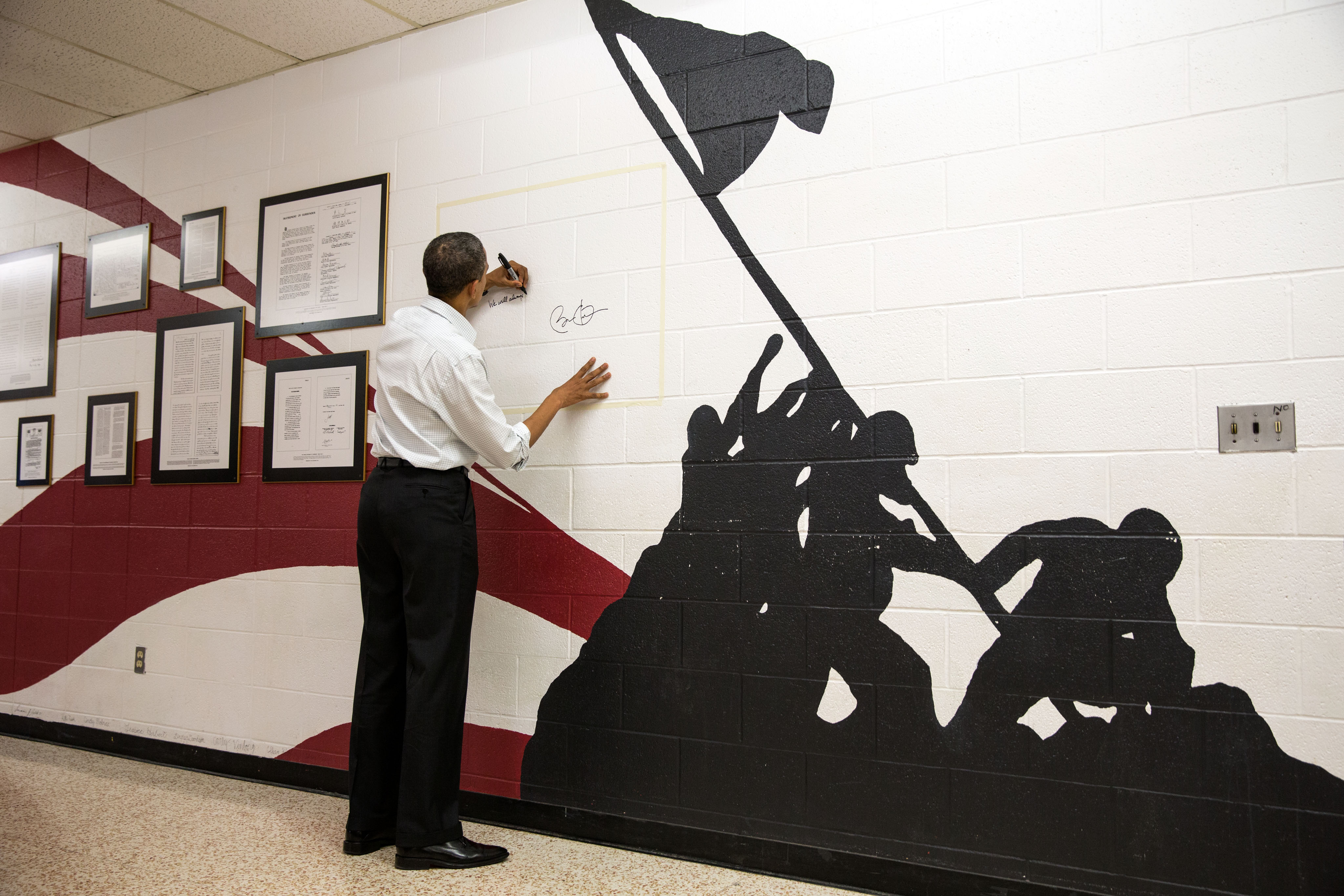
President Barack Obama signs a memorial wall designed by former art student Anthony Gajary at Mentor High after a campaign event, 2012. The wall was also signed by John McCain in 2008

The Mentor High School Fighting Cardinal Marching Band, commonly called the FCMB, is a music program. The band plays at most home and away football games as well as competing at several competitions. The FCMB received its first "Superior Rating", the highest rating possible for competitions at the state contest, in 2004 under the direction of Mr. Shawn Vondran and Mr. Byron Hunsicker. During the 2012–2013 school year, the band earned another Superior rating at state contest with their show "I Believe." They also performed live for Fox 8 News in front of The Rock and Roll hall of Fame, and performed at a campaign rally when President Obama came to Mentor High School during the 2012 Presidential Election. The band qualified for the state contest again in the fall of 2014, where they received their third Superior rating with their show entitled "The Divine Comedy." More recently, the band earned three superior ratings in a row at OMEA State Finals for the 2017-2018, 2018-2019 and 2019-2020 marching seasons, with the shows "To Boldly Go!", "The Hands of Time" and "Uninvited" respectively. This was accomplished under the current band director, Stephen Poremba.

=== Orchestra ===
Mentor has four orchestras in its program, including Concert, Sinfonia, Symphony, and Mannheim. Concert Orchestra is the smallest group, composed of stringed instruments and requires no audition to join. Sinfonia is a string-only ensemble for younger students who are committed to practicing but not yet prepared for Symphony Orchestra. Symphony Orchestra is the largest group and consists of string, percussion and wind instruments. Mannheim Chamber Orchestra is the most selective group and consists entirely of stringed instruments.

=== Choir ===
There are four curricular concert choirs that perform at concerts, festivals, and OMEA adjudicated events throughout the year. In addition, there are two vocal chamber ensembles and an auditioned show choir.

=== Science Olympiad ===
Mentor Science Olympiad has demonstrated a recent history of success. Top team finishes at the Ohio State Tournament include a first-place performance in 2017, second place in 2015, second place in 2009, and second place in 2007. Top team finishes at the National Tournament include a fourteenth-place finish in 2017, fifteenth-place finish in 2015, seventh-place finish in 2009, and fifth-place finish in 2007.

=== Athletics ===
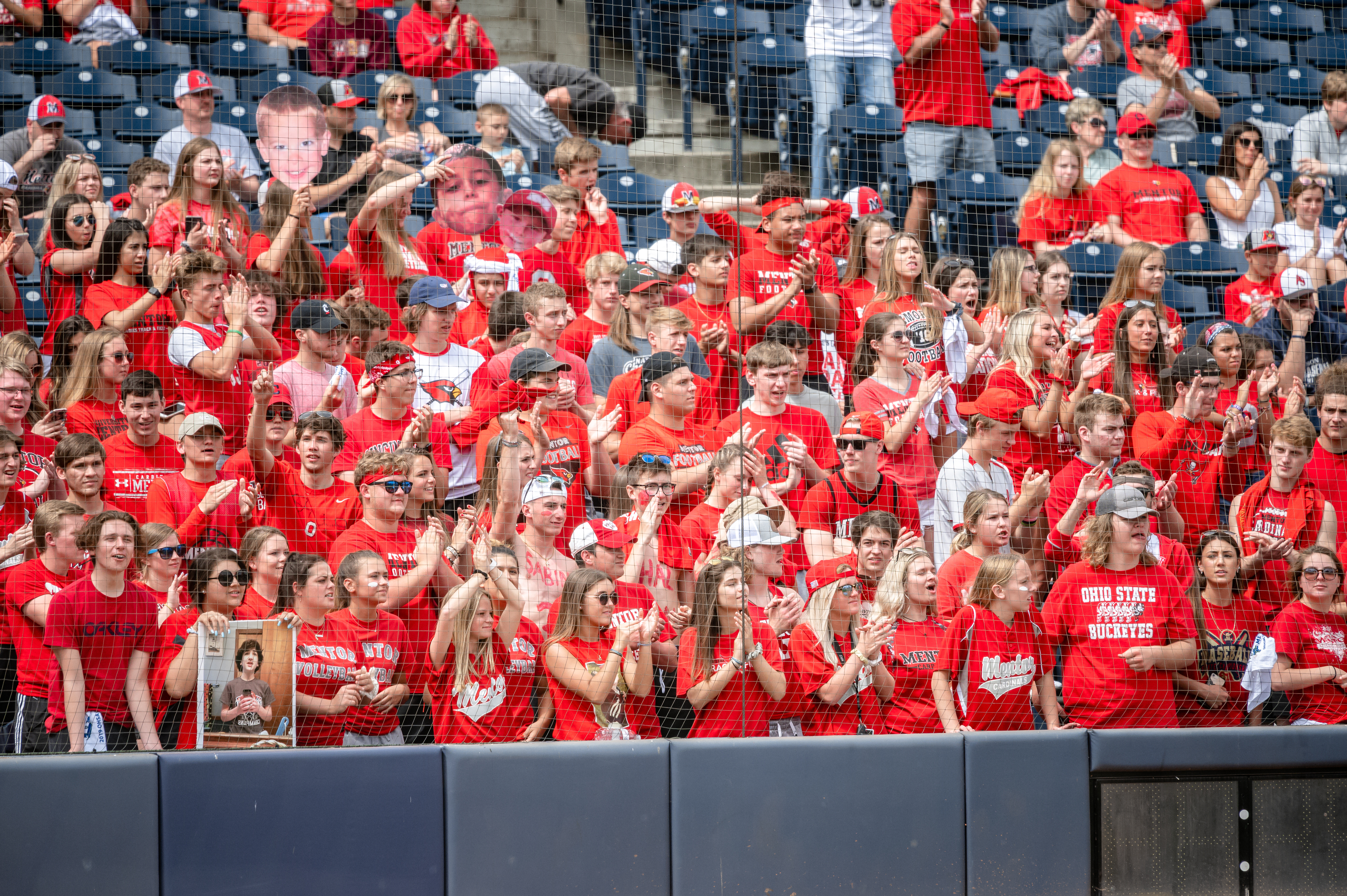
Mentor fans in the crowd at Canal Park during the 2019 OHSAA Division I baseball championship game

Mentor High School is classified as a Division I High School in the Ohio High School Athletic Association (OHSAA). Formerly of the Lake Erie League (LEL) and the Northeast Ohio Conference (NOC), Mentor now competes in the Greater Cleveland Conference (GCC)

The Mentor Cardinals have won several team and individual state championship titles and have many state appearances sponsored by the OHSAA.

Team State Champions

- Boys Track and Field - 1933
- Boys Cross Country - 1985
- Boys Soccer - 1994
- Boys Basketball - 2013
- Girls Track and Field -2021

=== Athletic highlights ===
- Mentor (25-5) defeated Toledo Rogers (21-8), 76–67, to win the boys basketball Division I state championship in front of 9,566 in Value City Arena on the campus of Ohio State University located in Columbus, OH. In the semi-final game, Mentor defeated previously undefeated Columbus Northland (29-1), 80–69.
- Coach Lee Tressel led the Mentor Cardinals football team to 34 consecutive victories in the 1950s.

== Notable alumni ==
- Tom Barndt - NFL Football player
- Gary Durchik - NCAA, Canadian Football League, and Canadian Junior Football League Football Coach
- Nyzier Fourqurean - NFL cornerback for the Los Angeles Rams
- Scotty Fox Jr. - West Virginia Mountaineers Quarterback
- Bob Hallen - NFL Football Player
- Leigh Janiak - Film director and screenwriter
- Johnny Joo - Photographer/writer
- Dustin Kirby - MLS Soccer Player
- Dave Lucas - Poet Laureate of the State of Ohio
- Micah Potter - NBA Basketball Player for the Utah Jazz
- Dan Ryczek - NFL Football Player
- Paul Ryczek - NFL Football Player
- Michael Salinger - Author
- Nick Samac - NFL Football Player for The Baltimore Ravens
- Katie Spotz - Endurance rower
- Jason Surrell - Show Writer and Producer
- Mitchell Trubisky - 2012 Mr. Football Award recipient, 2nd pick overall in the 2017 NFL draft
- Siniša Ubiparipović - MLS Soccer Player – Montreal Impact
- Matt Van Epps - U.S. Representative from Tennessee's 7th congressional district
- David Wilcox - Recording Artist

== Student suicides ==
Five students died by suicide in an approximately four-year period ending in 2008, allegedly as a result of harassment or bullying from fellow students. The suicides prompted two of the families to file lawsuits against the school, one of which was settled out of court in 2014 and the other was dismissed in 2015. This is depicted by the 2014 documentary Mentor.
