= Mentor Township =

Mentor Township may refer to the following places in the United States:

- Mentor Township, Cheboygan County, Michigan
- Mentor Township, Oscoda County, Michigan
- Mentor Township, Divide County, North Dakota in Divide County, North Dakota
- Mentor Township, Lake County, Ohio, former township incorporated into the cities of Mentor and Mentor-on-the-Lake and a portion of the village of Kirtland Hills

== See also ==
- Mentor (disambiguation)
