= Nick Samac =

American football player (born 2001)

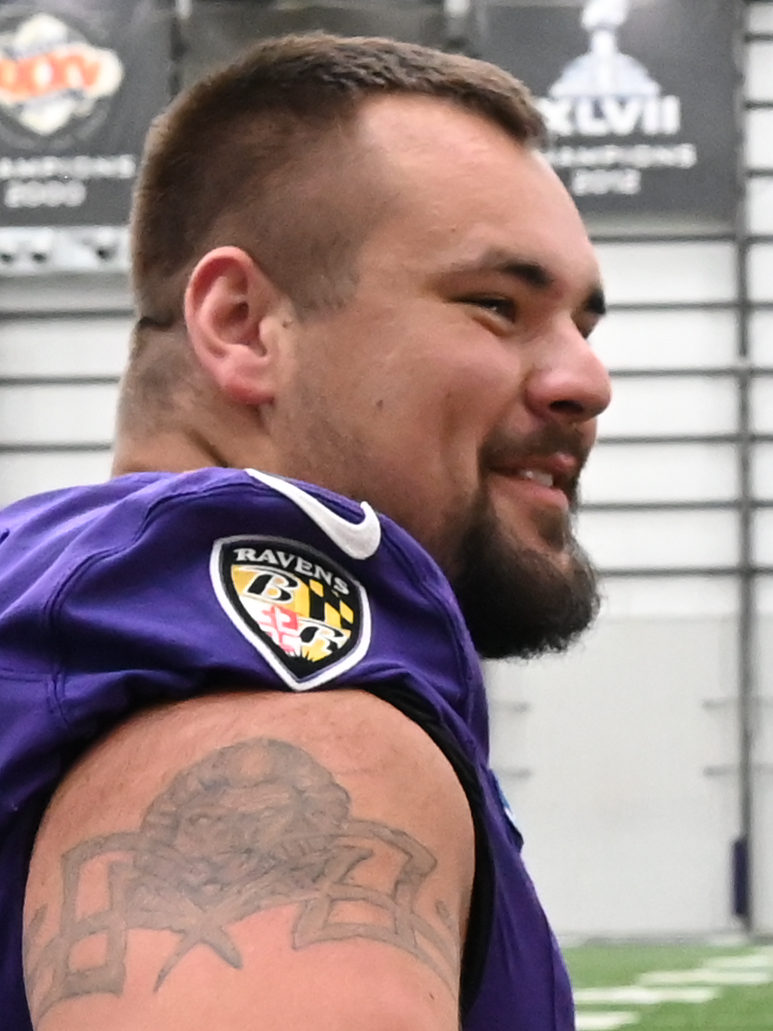
- Samac with the Baltimore Ravens in 2024

No. 62 – Minnesota Vikings
- Position: Center
- Roster status: Injured reserve

Personal information
- Born: August 21, 2001 (age 25); Mentor, Ohio, U.S.
- Listed height: 6 ft 4 in (1.93 m)
- Listed weight: 317 lb (144 kg)

Career information
- High school: Mentor
- College: Michigan State (2019–2023)
- NFL draft: 2024: 7th round, 228th overall pick

Career history
- Baltimore Ravens (2024–2025); Carolina Panthers (2025); Minnesota Vikings (2026–present)

Career NFL statistics as of 2025
- Games played: 11
- Stats at Pro Football Reference

Nicholas Samac (/ˈseɪmæk/ SAY-mak; born August 21, 2001) is an American professional football center for the Minnesota Vikings of the National Football League (NFL). He played college football for the Michigan State Spartans.

== Early life ==
Samac attended Mentor High School in Mentor, Ohio. Coming out of high school Samac was rated as a three-star recruit where he held offers from schools such as Michigan State, Ohio State, Minnesota, Vanderbilt, Duke, Indiana, and Boston College. Samac committed to play college football for the Michigan State Spartans.

== College career ==
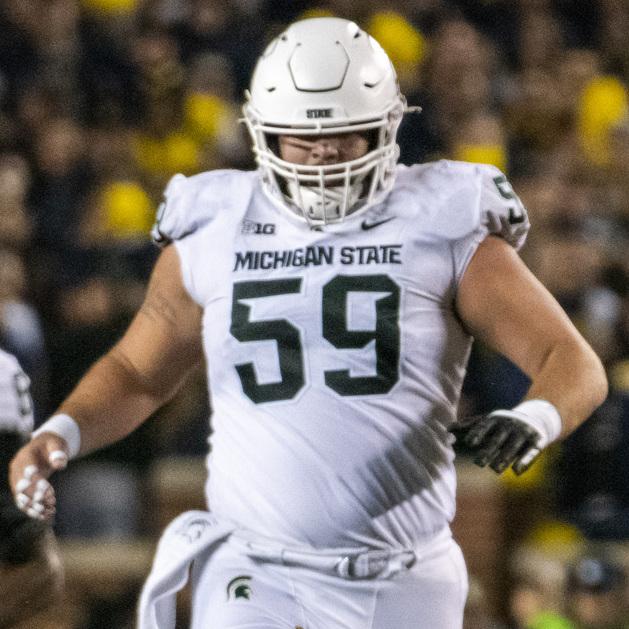
Samac with the Michigan State Spartans in 2022

In Samac's freshman season in 2019, due to injuries to starting center Matt Allen, Samac played in seven games with four starts. In 2020, Samac played in seven games with six starts. During the 2021 season, Samac played in all 13 games for the Spartans with no starts. During the 2022 season, Samac played in and started all 12 games for Michigan State. Heading into the 2023 season, Samac was named to the Rimington Trophy watch list, which is presented annually to the nation’s top center. During the 2023 season, Samac played in eleven games with ten starts, where he was named honorable mention all Big-Ten for his performance on the year. After the conclusion of the 2023 season, Samac would head to the 2024 NFL draft where he participated in the NFL Scouting Combine and the East-West Shrine Bowl.

In his college career, Samac played in 48 games with 32 starts.

== Professional career ==
Pre-draft measurables
Height	Weight	Arm length	Hand span	Wingspan
6 ft 4 in (1.93 m)	307 lb (139 kg)	32 3/4 in (0.83 m)	9 3/4 in (0.25 m)	6 ft 7 in (2.01 m)
All values from NFL Combine

=== Baltimore Ravens ===
Samac was selected with the 228th overall pick in the seventh round by the Baltimore Ravens in the 2024 NFL draft, which was traded to them by the New York Jets in exchange for safety Chuck Clark.

On August 26, 2025, Samac was released by the Ravens, and signed to the practice squad.

=== Carolina Panthers ===
On September 16, 2025, Samac was signed by the Carolina Panthers off the Ravens practice squad.

On August 30, 2026, Samac was waived by the Panthers as a part of final roster cuts.

=== Minnesota Vikings ===
On August 31, 2026, Samac was claimed off of waivers by the Minnesota Vikings. On September 26, he was placed on the Vikings injured reserve list.
