= Poet Laureate of Ohio =

- Incumbent; Edward A. Julian Sr. since 2026
- Type: Poet Laureate
- Formation: 2016
- First holder: Amit Majmudar

The poet laureate of Ohio is the poet laureate for the U.S. state of Ohio. In 2014, Ohio enacted law creating the position of Ohio poet laureate starting July 1, 2016. The Ohio Arts Council provides a list of candidates to the governor for selection to serve a two-year term, with the possibility of reappointment.

== List of poets laureate ==
The following have held the position:

- Amit Majmudar (2016-2017)
- Dave Lucas (2018-2020)
- Kari Gunter-Seymour (2020-2025)
- Edward A. Julian, Sr. (2026-present)

== See also ==
- Poet laureate
- List of U.S. state poets laureate
- United States Poet Laureate
