= Tom Barndt =

American football player (born 1972)

No. 71, 93, 96
- Positions: Defensive tackle, guard, center

Personal information
- Born: March 14, 1972 (age 54); Mentor, Ohio, U.S.
- Listed height: 6 ft 3 in (1.91 m)
- Listed weight: 300 lb (136 kg)

Career information
- High school: Mentor
- College: Pittsburgh
- NFL draft: 1995: 6th round, 207th overall pick

Career history
- Scottish Claymores (1996); Kansas City Chiefs (1996–1999); Cincinnati Bengals (2000); New York Jets (2001)

Career NFL statistics
- Tackles: 112
- Sacks: 8
- Fumble recoveries: 5
- Stats at Pro Football Reference

Thomas Allen Barndt (born March 14, 1972) is an American former professional football player who was a defensive tackle for six seasons with the Kansas City Chiefs, Cincinnati Bengals, and New York Jets of the National Football League (NFL). He played college football for the Pittsburgh Panthers and was selected in the sixth round of the 1995 NFL draft with the 207th overall pick.
