= Nyzier Fourqurean =

American football player (born 2002)

No. 25 – Los Angeles Rams
- Position: Cornerback
- Roster status: Practice squad

Personal information
- Born: January 1, 2002 (age 24); Mentor, Ohio, U.S.
- Listed height: 6 ft 1 in (1.85 m)
- Listed weight: 190 lb (86 kg)

Career information
- High school: Mentor
- College: Grand Valley State (2021–2022); Wisconsin (2023–2024)
- NFL draft: 2026: undrafted

Career history
- Los Angeles Rams (2026–present)*
- * Offseason or practice squad member only

Awards and highlights
- First-team All-GLIAC (2022)
- Stats at Pro Football Reference

Nyzier Fourqurean (born January 1, 2002) is an American professional football cornerback for the Los Angeles Rams of the National Football League (NFL). He played college football for the Grand Valley State Lakers and Wisconsin Badgers.

== Early life ==
Fourqurean attended Mentor High School in Mentor, Ohio, where he was named first-team all-conference, all-district, all-region and all-county as a senior. After initially committing to play for the Saint Francis (PA) Red Flash, Fourqurean opted to commit to play for the Grand Valley State Lakers.

== College career ==
=== Grand Valley State ===
As a freshman, Fourqurean saw limited playing time, appearing in 11 games and making 13 tackles. Fourqurean saw a heavy increase in playing time in his sophomore season, playing in 13 games and recording 37 tackles and four interceptions. Fourqurean was named to the Don Hansen NCAA Division II All-America team and a first-team Division II All-American. Following the season, Fourqurean entered the transfer portal.

=== Wisconsin ===
After initially committing to Vanderbilt, Fourqurean flipped his commitment to play for Wisconsin. In his first season, Fourqurean dealt with Thoracic outlet syndrome, limiting his playing time. In 2024, Fourqurean was the team's starting cornerback alongside Ricardo Hallman, finishing with 51 tackles and an inteception.

==== Eligibility request and lawsuit ====
Following the 2024 season, Fourqurean had exhausted his player eligibility after playing four seasons without any redshirts. However, on January 29, 2025, Fourqurean sued the NCAA after being denied a fifth season of eligibility, claiming that his Division II playing time at Grand Valley State should not be counted. On February 6, Fourqurean was granted a preliminary injunction by William M. Conley that allowed him to play another season of college football. Months later, on July 17, 2026, the injunction was reversed by the Seventh Circuit court, rendering him inelligbile for the 2025 season. The case was scheduled to go on trial in October 2025, but after being delayed to 2026, Fourqurean announced he had dropped the suit on November 21.

== Professional career ==
Pre-draft measurables
Height	Weight	Arm length	Hand span	Wingspan	40-yard dash	10-yard split	20-yard split	20-yard shuttle	Three-cone drill	Vertical jump	Broad jump	Bench press
6 ft 0 3/8 in (1.84 m)	190 lb (86 kg)	31 3/4 in (0.81 m)	10 1/2 in (0.27 m)	6 ft 5 1/4 in (1.96 m)	4.65 s	1.58 s	2.60 s	4.10 s	6.84 s	37.0 in (0.94 m)	10 ft 1 in (3.07 m)	16 reps
All values from Pro Day

After not being selected in the 2026 NFL draft, Fourqurean signed with the Los Angeles Rams as an undrafted free agent. On August 30, 2026, Fourqurean was waived by Los Angeles as a part of final roster cuts; he was re-signed to the team's practice squad the following day. On October 27, Fourqurean was released by the Rams, but then re-signed to the practice squad six days later.
