= Barbara Armonas =

Lithuanian political prisoner

- Barbara Armonas, from a 1960 newspaper photo
- Born: Barbora Balčiūnaitė; December 28, 1908; Maskoliškiai, Russian Empire
- Died: December 25, 2008 (aged 99); Mentor, Ohio
- Other name: Barbora Armonienė
- Known for: Political prisoner
- Notable work: Leave Your Tears in Moscow (1961, memoir)

Barbara Armonas (Lithuanian: Barbora Armonienė; December 28, 1908 – December 25, 2008) was a Lithuanian political prisoner in the Soviet Union. She rejoined her American-born husband and daughter in the United States in 1960, and she published a memoir, Leave Your Tears in Moscow, in 1961.

== Biography ==
=== Early years ===
Armonas was born in a small village of Maskoliškiai near Pasvalys in northern Lithuania. She married a Lithuanian-American machinist, John Armonas, in 1929. They lived in Cleveland, Ohio, for six years; their daughter, Donna, was born in Ohio. They moved to Lithuania in the 1930s, and bought a farm in Suostas; their son John was born in Lithuania.

=== War years and after ===
In 1939, American citizens were warned to leave Lithuania; her husband and five-year-old daughter left, but she and her infant son did not have the paperwork ready to join them, so both stayed behind. She and her son were deported to Siberia in 1948, and she was tried as an American spy in 1951. While serving her prison sentence in a women's work camp, she was assigned to sew clothing in a factory, and do gardening at an exhibition camp. In 1955, she was allowed to return to Lithuania under an amnesty for political prisoners. She lived in a rented room in Pasvalys.

In late 1959, after meeting with David L. Lawrence, governor of Pennsylvania, and after years of pleas from John and Donna Armonas, Nikita Khrushchev agreed to allow the Armonas mother and son to leave the Soviet Union. They finally left in 1960. The family was reunited in Copenhagen after almost 22 years apart.

=== Later years ===
Armonas lived in Ohio with her husband and children after 1960. She completed a memoir with writer Algirdas L. Nasvytis, Leave Your Tears in Moscow (1961). "No one who reads it will fail to be moved by this courageous woman's account of her struggle for survival in a police state", said one American reviewer in 1965. Her book was translated into at least four other languages, and excerpts were published in Life magazine.

In her later years, Armonas was active in Lithuanian community activities in Cleveland. Her husband died shortly after they celebrated their fiftieth anniversary in 1979. After Lithuanian independence in 1991, she was able to visit family members in Lithuania. She died in 2008, three days before her 100th birthday, in Mentor, Ohio. Her memoir was published in a new edition in 2011, on its fiftieth anniversary, with additional photographs and material added by her son. Her son also published a memoir, How I Became a Comrade: An American Growing Up in Siberian Exile (2013).
