= Kirtland Hills, Ohio =

- Village
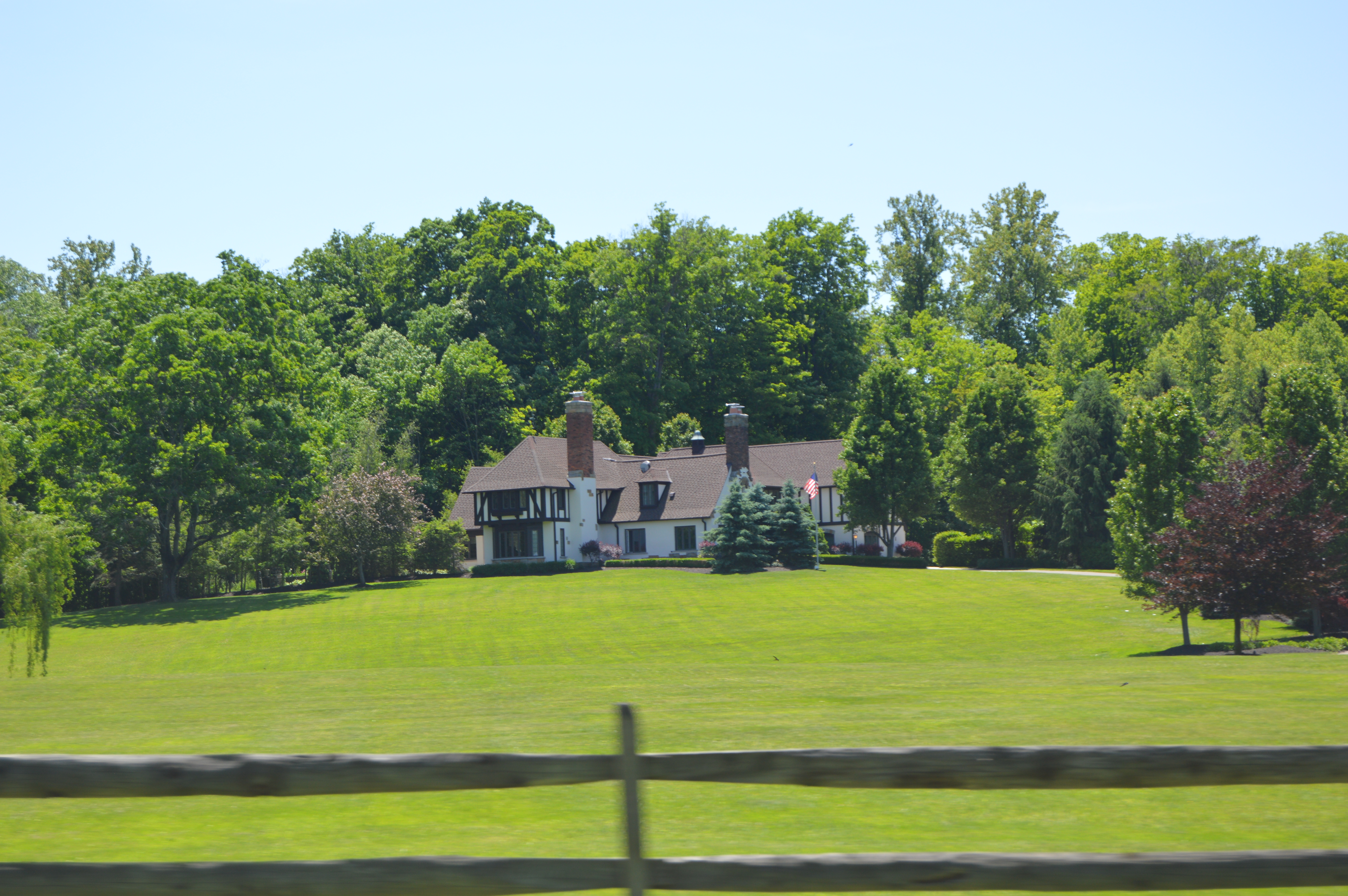
- Estate of Leonard C. Hanna Jr.

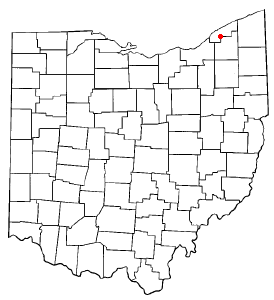
- Location of Kirtland Hills, Ohio

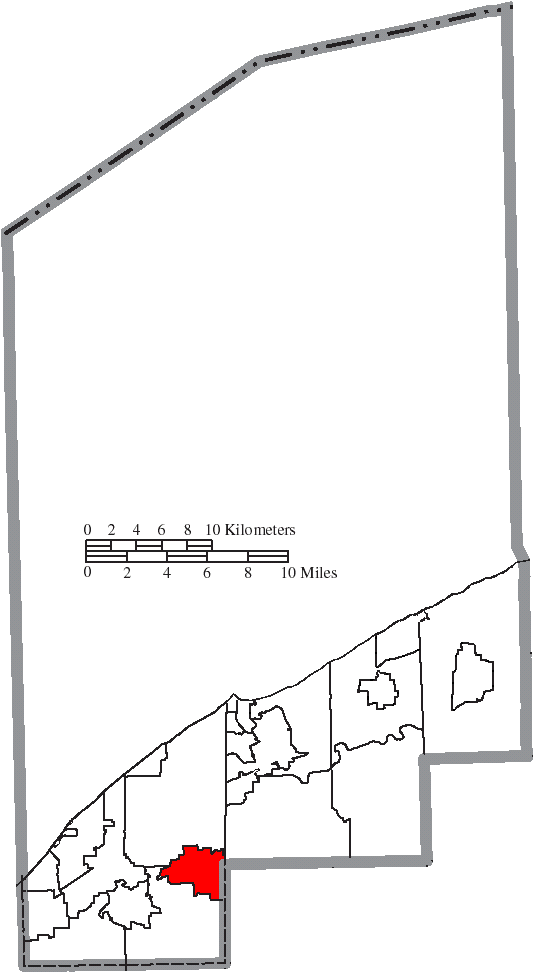
- Location of Kirtland Hills in Lake County
- Coordinates: 41°37′43″N 81°18′45″W
- Country: United States
- State: Ohio
- County: Lake

Government
  - Mayor: John Turben (R)

Area
  - Total: 5.65 sq mi (14.63 km^{2})
  - Land: 5.57 sq mi (14.43 km^{2})
  - Water: 0.077 sq mi (0.20 km^{2})
- Elevation: 712 ft (217 m)

Population (2020)
  - Total: 692
  - Density: 124.2/sq mi (47.96/km^{2})
- Time zone: UTC-5 (Eastern (EST))
  - Summer (DST): UTC-4 (EDT)
- ZIP codes: 44060, 44094
- Area code: 440
- FIPS code: 39-40670
- GNIS feature ID: 1086420
- Website: https://www.kirtlandhills.org/

Kirtland Hills is a village in Lake County, Ohio, United States and a rural suburb of Cleveland. The population was 692 at the 2020 census.

== Geography ==
According to the United States Census Bureau, the village has a total area of 5.65 square miles (14.63 km^{2}), of which 5.57 square miles (14.43 km^{2}) is land and 0.08 square miles (0.21 km^{2}) is water.

== Demographics ==
Historical population
Census	Pop.	Note	%±
1930	206		—
1940	237		15.0%
1950	235		−0.8%
1960	292		24.3%
1970	452		54.8%
1980	506		11.9%
1990	628		24.1%
2000	597		−4.9%
2010	646		8.2%
2020	692		7.1%
U.S. Decennial Census

=== 2010 census ===
As of the census of 2010, there were 646 people, 245 households, and 200 families living in the village. The population density was 116.0 inhabitants per square mile (44.8/km^{2}). There were 272 housing units at an average density of 48.8 per square mile (18.8/km^{2}). The racial makeup of the village was 96.7% White, 1.7% Asian, and 1.5% from two or more races. Hispanic or Latino of any race were 2.8% of the population.

There were 245 households, of which 29.4% had children under the age of 18 living with them, 71.4% were married couples living together, 4.5% had a female householder with no husband present, 5.7% had a male householder with no wife present, and 18.4% were non-families. 14.7% of all households were made up of individuals, and 9.7% had someone living alone who was 65 years of age or older. The average household size was 2.64 and the average family size was 2.93.

The median age in the village was 48 years. 22.4% of residents were under the age of 18; 5.4% were between the ages of 18 and 24; 15.4% were from 25 to 44; 37.7% were from 45 to 64; and 19.2% were 65 years of age or older. The gender makeup of the village was 48.6% male and 51.4% female.

=== 2000 census ===
As of the census of 2000, there were 597 people, 223 households, and 179 families living in the village. The population density was 106.9 inhabitants per square mile (41.3/km^{2}). There were 242 housing units at an average density of 43.3 per square mile (16.7/km^{2}). The racial makeup of the village was 98.16% White, 0.34% African American, 0.17% Asian, and 1.34% from two or more races. Hispanic or Latino of any race were 0.50% of the population. 17.7% were of Italian, 16.8% German, 12.5% Irish, 8.4% English, 5.4% American, 5.4% Slovene and 5.0% Hungarian ancestry according to Census 2000.

There were 223 households, out of which 29.6% had children under the age of 18 living with them, 74.0% were married couples living together, 4.9% had a female householder with no husband present, and 19.3% were non-families. 14.8% of all households were made up of individuals, and 6.3% had someone living alone who was 65 years of age or older. The average household size was 2.68 and the average family size was 2.99.

In the village, the population was spread out, with 24.0% under the age of 18, 3.9% from 18 to 24, 22.6% from 25 to 44, 36.5% from 45 to 64, and 13.1% who were 65 years of age or older. The median age was 45 years. For every 100 females there were 92.6 males. For every 100 females age 18 and over, there were 99.1 males.

The median income for a household in the village was $112,421, and the median income for a family was $144,134. Males had a median income of $87,424 versus $37,083 for females. The per capita income for the village was $78,896. About 2.1% of families and 3.2% of the population were below the poverty line, including none of those under age 18 and 4.3% of those age 65 or over.

== Education ==
Kirtland Hills is split between Mentor Public Schools (Northern portions of Village) and Kirtland Local Schools (Southern portions of Village).

== Education ==
The municipality is divided between the Willoughby-Eastlake School District and the Kirtland Local School District.

Most students in Mentor Schools are zoned to Hopkins Elementary School while a portion is in the boundary of Brentmoor Elementary School. Most students in the section are zoned to Memorial Middle School. All students in the Mentor school district are zoned to Mentor High School.

Nearby private schools include Andrews Osborne Academy.

== Parks and conservation ==
Kirtland Hills is home to a number of parks and conservation spaces:

- Holden Arboretum
- Children’s Schoolhouse Nature Park
- Little Mountain, elevation 1,266 feet
