= Bob Hallen =

American football player (born 1975)

No. 62, 64
- Positions: Offensive guard, center

Personal information
- Born: March 9, 1975 (age 51); Cleveland, Ohio, U.S.
- Listed height: 6 ft 3 in (1.91 m)
- Listed weight: 305 lb (138 kg)

Career information
- High school: Mentor (Mentor, Ohio)
- College: Kent State
- NFL draft: 1998: 2nd round, 53rd overall pick

Career history
- Atlanta Falcons (1998–2001); San Diego Chargers (2002–2003); New England Patriots (2004)*; San Diego Chargers (2004-2005); Cleveland Browns (2006)*
- * Offseason or practice squad member only

Career NFL statistics
- Games played: 86
- Games started: 47
- Stats at Pro Football Reference

Robert Joseph Hallen (born March 9, 1975) is an American former professional football player who was an offensive guard and center in the National Football League (NFL).

Hallen played high school football at Mentor High School, where he was honorable mention all-state his senior season after serving as team captain. Hallen was a four-year starter playing college football for the Kent State Golden Flashes, starting 44 consecutive games. In the spring of 1997, Hallen was awarded the Don Nottingham Cup as the team's top offensive player at the conclusion of Spring practice. He was a first-team All-Mid-American Conference choice in 1997 after switching to right tackle after three seasons at center. Hallen also served as team captain during the senior year.

Following his senior season, Hallen was chosen to play in the 1998 Senior Bowl in Mobile, Alabama, marking the first time a Kent State player participated in this bowl game. Hallen was selected in the 1998 NFL draft by the Atlanta Falcons in the second round (53rd overall) and went on to play in Super Bowl XXXIII. He played from 1998 to 2001 for the Falcons. He also played for the San Diego Chargers from 2002 to 2005. He signed with the Cleveland Browns prior to the 2006 NFL season.

Hallen's career came to an end on August 11, 2006, when he announced his retirement due to ongoing problems with his back, which he first injured in the 2001 season while playing for the Falcons.

Hallen announced his retirement shortly after he was named the Browns' starting center in place of injured LeCharles Bentley. Hallen had left practice several days earlier complaining of back spasms. Hallen notified the Browns of his retirement in a letter.

Hallen was inducted into Mentor High School's Sports Hall Of Fame in 2005 and the Kent State University's Varsity "K" Hall Of Fame in 2014.

Hallen currently works for a fire department in the Greater Cleveland area.
