= Dustin Kirby =

American soccer player

Personal information
- Date of birth: December 12, 1984 (age 41)
- Place of birth: Mentor, Ohio, USA
- Height: 5 ft 10 in (1.78 m)
- Position: Defender

Team information
- Current team: Club Leona
- Number: 28

College career
Years	Team	Apps	(Gls)
2003–2006	Ohio State Buckeyes		

Senior career*
Years	Team	Apps	(Gls)
2004	Cleveland Internationals		
2007–2008	Real Salt Lake	2	(0)
- * Club domestic league appearances and goals as of 13 March 2009

Dustin Kirby (born December 12, 1984, in Mentor, Ohio) is an American association football defender who is known for playing for Real Salt Lake.

== Youth ==
Born and raised in the suburbs of Cleveland, Kirby played on the Impact team of the Cleveland Soccer Academy from 1994 through 2003. During that time he served as captain of the CSA Super Y team in 2002 and won a national championship in July 2003 as a member of the CSA Force Juniors of the U-19 Super Y League. As a member of the 2003 Ohio North State Team, he was named to the Region II pool.

Kirby graduated from Mentor High School in 2003 and was a 2003 NSCAA/Adidas Men's Soccer All-American. Kirby decided to attend Ohio State University in Columbus, Ohio. During his four years at Ohio State University he started every game but one (82 matches) during his career. Kirby was 1st-Team all Big Ten his senior year. He spent the 2004 collegiate offseason with the Cleveland Internationals in the USL Premier Development League.

== Professional ==
When the 2007 MLS Superdraft came along, Kirby was not initially selected, but he was taken later on, in the 4th round of the supplemental draft, by Real Salt Lake. In two seasons with the club, Kirby made two league appearances, as well as playing in an exhibition match against the national team of Fiji. His debut came on October 15, 2007, in a 1–0 loss against the Houston Dynamo.

Kirby was released by Real Salt Lake on November 25, 2008. He remains without a team as of March 2009.
