= Katie Spotz =

American adventurer (born 1987)

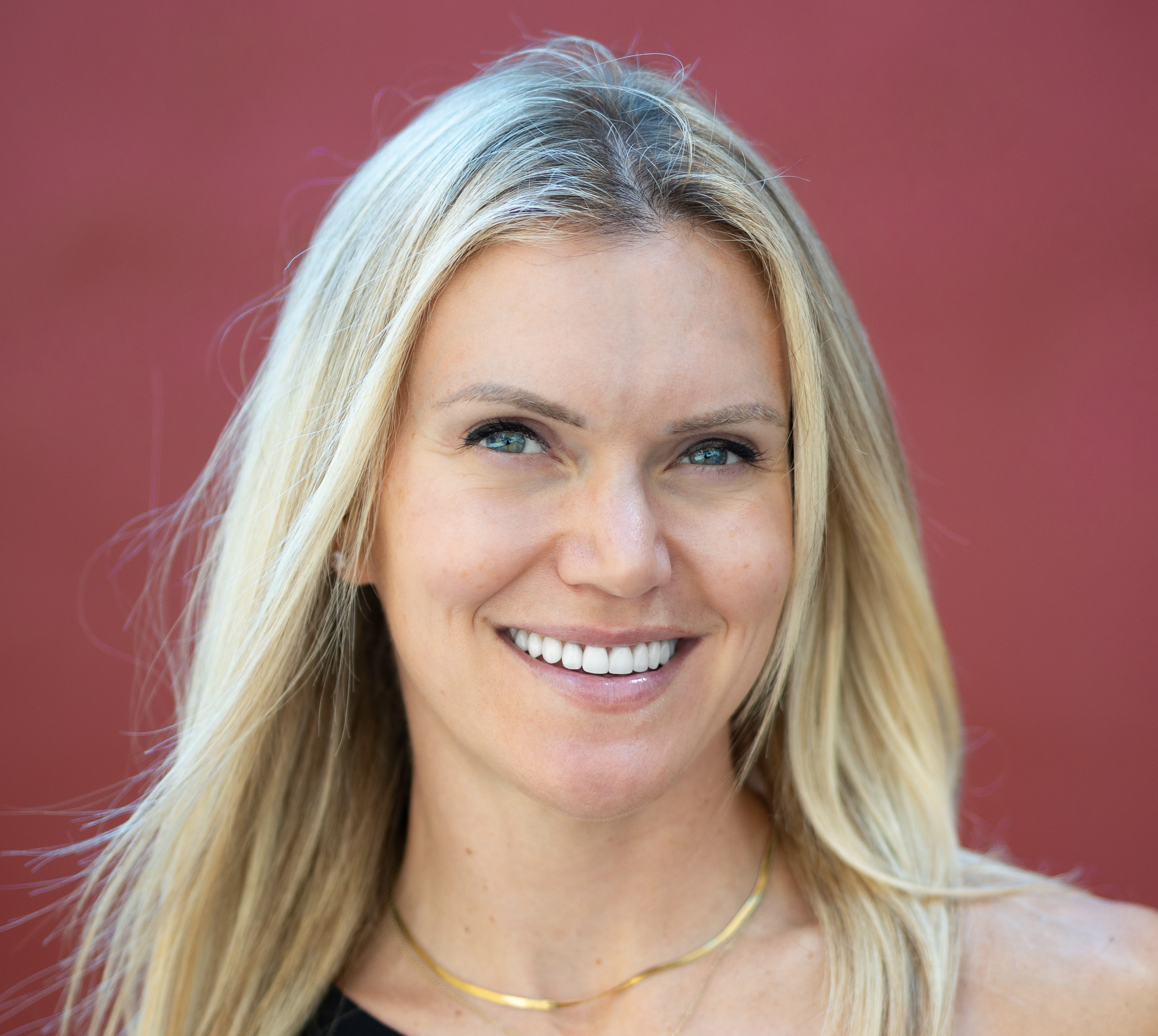
Endurance athlete Katie Spotz

Katie Spotz (born 1987) is an American adventurer who became the youngest person to row solo across the Atlantic Ocean, departing from Dakar, Senegal on January 3, 2010, and landing in Guyana on March 14, 2010. She was the first person to have swum the entire length of the Allegheny River in New York state and Pennsylvania.

== Early life ==
Spotz was born in Mentor, Ohio. She graduated from Mentor High School in 2005 and Warren Wilson College in Asheville, North Carolina, in 2008.

== Military career ==
In 2018, Spotz enlisted in the U.S. Coast Guard as a Fireman. In 2019, Spotz was commissioned as an active duty Response Officer. Spotz was awarded Elite Female Athlete of the Year for 2020 by the U.S. Coast Guard.

== Records ==
In 2008, Spotz became the first person to swim the entire 325 miles (523 km) length of the Allegheny River, which runs between New York state and Pennsylvania. Accompanied by safety kayaker, James Hendershott, the two began on July 22 to hike the "stream" for 27 miles before starting at swimming depth on the river at Roulette, Pennsylvania. Swimming 12 to 15 miles a day, 6 to 8 hours a day for a month, they finished at the "Point" where the Allegheny and the Monongahela River join to form the Ohio River in Downtown Pittsburgh less than a month later, on August 21, 2008.

On January 3, 2010, Spotz embarked on a solo ocean rowing crossing of the Atlantic Ocean, in a planned 2,473 miles (3,980 km) westward route from Senegal to French Guiana. During her journey, her diet consisted mostly of dehydrated meals. En route she altered the route, increasing the total distance by approximately 400 miles (640 km), setting Georgetown, Guyana as the terminus for a total distance of 2,817 miles (4,534 km). Spotz altered course because weather conditions at her original destination were not favorable for an unassisted landing. She completed the trip on March 14, 2010, to become the youngest person to ever row solo across the Atlantic Ocean and the only American to row solo from Africa to South America, rowing 3,038 miles (4,889 km) from West Africa to South America without a support vessel following her. Spotz is also only the second woman to have rowed solo across the Atlantic from mainland to mainland, following the January 2007 crossing by Sophie Macé of France who rowed from Saint Louis, Senegal, to Saint Laurent, French Guiana. Spotz's boat, "Liv", is a 19-foot vessel that was used in a successful crossing of the Atlantic Ocean in 2009. The boat was designed by British boat designer Phil Morrison, who had been asked by Scottish rower Chay Blyth, who himself rowed across the North Atlantic in 1966, to design a small, light boat capable of surviving extreme conditions. This design was later modified to a solo vessel. More than $150,000 was raised for clean water projects as the mission behind the row.

In 2011, Spotz and teammate, Sam Williams, set off to break the world record for the fastest two-person team to cycle across America. A week before the race, Spotz broke her pelvis during a training ride and instead competed on a hand-bike. With the support of additional riders, Spotz and Williams finished in 7 d 16 h 59 m.

In 2020, Spotz became the first woman to run nonstop across the state of New Hampshire in 11 hours and across the state of Vermont in 13 hours.

On September 6, 2020, Spotz became the first person to run nonstop across the state of Maine in 33 hours covering 137.8-miles nonstop. The run began at the Colburn Gore-Woburn Border Crossing and finished in Freeport, Maine.

On July 1, 2021, Spotz broke "the female world record for the most consecutive ultra-marathons in a row by completing 11 daily 31-mile runs" from Cincinnati to Cleveland, Ohio.

== Ultra-endurance challenges ==
The Big Ride Across America, from June to August 2006–she cycled 3,300 miles across the United States from Seattle to D.C., averaging 85 miles a day for 40 days. Together, with 40 other cyclists, they raised more than $250,000 for the American Lung Association. Since then, Spotz has completed five Ironman events and in July 2015, Spotz took 1st place as the overall female winner in the Olympic distance race at the Cleveland Triathlon. In addition to triathlons, she has completed multiple ultra runs, marathons, and cycling events all in the name of clean water. Her efforts have fundraised over $400,000 for clean water initiatives all over the world.

== Book ==
Five years after her Atlantic crossing, Spotz's book, Just Keep Rowing, which is co-authored by Mark Bowles, details the various lessons she learned during her 70-day journey. A portion of the proceeds from Just Keep Rowing will support the mission of partner, H_{2}O for Life.

== Charitable work ==
In 2011, Spotz founded a nonprofit organization called Schools for Water to educate, motivate, and inspire students to tackle the global water crisis. Students gathered and broke the Guinness World Record for the "most people carrying water jugs on their heads" during an event. The record was broken in 2014 by one of the schools Katie shared her message during a school assembly.

== Motivational speaking ==
Through a partnership with H_{2}O for Life, Spotz toured the country speaking to more than 100,000 students across 50 cities.

== Bibliography ==
- Spotz, Katie; Mark Bowles (2015). Just Keep Rowing. Self-published. ISBN 978-0692474860.
