= Mentor (comics) =

Mentor is a name used by several comics-related characters.

== Marvel Comics ==
It is shared by two characters in Marvel Comics:

- Mentor (A'lars), the founder and leader of the Eternals
- Mentor, a member of the Shi'ar Imperial Guard see List of Marvel Comics characters: M

== DC Comics ==
- Mentor, the guardian for Billy Batson (Captain Marvel) in the 1970s live action TV show Shazam! (TV series)

== See also ==
- Mentor (disambiguation)
