= Mentor Court =

- U.S. National Register of Historic Places
- U.S. Historic district
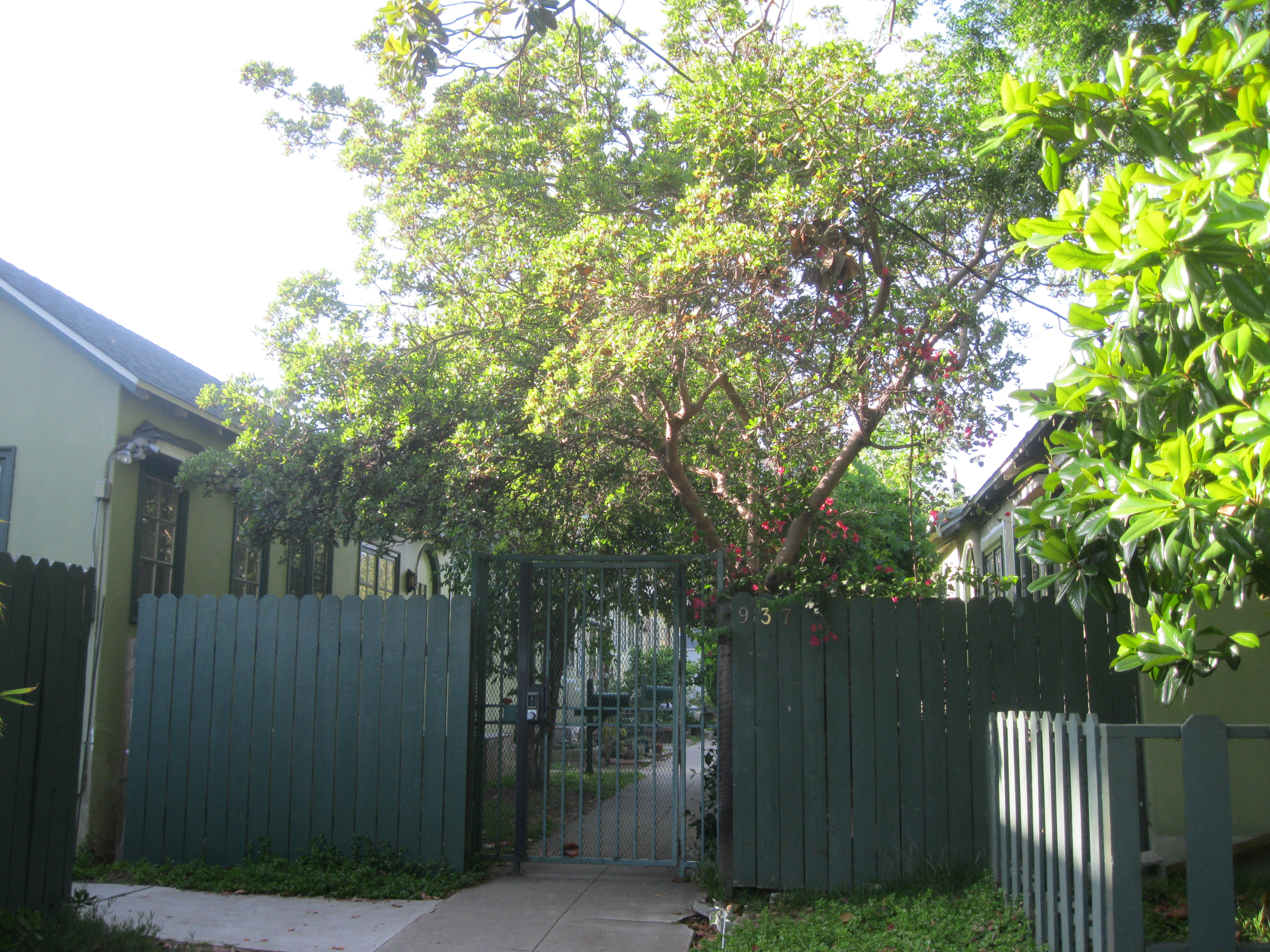

- Location within the Los Angeles metropolitan area Location within California Location within the United States
- Location: 937 E. California Blvd., Pasadena, California
- Coordinates: 34°8′10″N 118°7′49″W
- Area: less than one acre
- Built: 1923
- Built by: Delux Building
- Architectural style: English Cottage Revival
- MPS: Bungalow Courts of Pasadena TR
- NRHP reference No.: 94001323
- Added to NRHP: November 15, 1994

Mentor Court is a bungalow court located at 937 E. California Blvd. in Pasadena, California. The court is located on a 60 feet (18 m) wide property, which is considered narrow for bungalow courts, and comprises five buildings containing eleven residential units; the buildings include single-unit, duplex, and triplex houses, an unusual combination in a bungalow court. The buildings are designed in the English Cottage Revival style and feature jerkinhead roofs, arched doors with glass paneling, and a stoop at each entrance covered by an eyebrow hood. The Delux Building company built the court in 1923.

The court was added to the National Register of Historic Places on November 15, 1994.
