= Mentor-on-the-Lake, Ohio =

- City
- Location of Mentor-on-the-Lake in Greater Cleveland

- Location within Ohio Location within the United States
- Coordinates: 41°42′39″N 81°22′18″W
- Country: United States
- State: Ohio
- County: Lake

Government
  - Mayor: David Eva (D)

Area
  - Total: 1.65 sq mi (4.28 km^{2})
  - Land: 1.61 sq mi (4.18 km^{2})
  - Water: 0.039 sq mi (0.10 km^{2})
- Elevation: 604 ft (184 m)

Population (2020)
  - Total: 7,131
  - Density: 4,420.6/sq mi (1,706.79/km^{2})
- Time zone: UTC-5 (Eastern (EST))
  - Summer (DST): UTC-4 (EDT)
- ZIP code: 44060
- Area code: 440
- FIPS code: 39-49098
- GNIS feature ID: 1086426
- Website: mentoronthelake.gov

Mentor-on-the-Lake is a city in Lake County, Ohio, United States. The population was 7,131 at the 2020 census.

== History ==
Originally part of Mentor Township, the village was established October 22, 1924. The U.S. Census for 1970 recorded the official population as being over 5,000 and thus it became an incorporated city on February 12, 1971.

A vast majority of the land that comprises Mentor-On-The-Lake was originally owned and deeded as the Dickey-Moore tract and extended all the way south beyond U.S. Route 20 in the city of Mentor. A remnant of this era is a property known as Mooreland which was once owned by the Moore family and is situated on land that now houses Lakeland Community College.

Mentor-on-the-Lake shares many services with the nearby city of Mentor, including postal service.

== Geography ==
According to the United States Census Bureau, the city has a total area of 1.65 square miles (4.27 km^{2}), of which 1.61 square miles (4.17 km^{2}) is land and 0.04 square miles (0.10 km^{2}) is water.

== Demographics ==
Historical population
Census	Pop.	Note	%±
1930	230		—
1940	538		133.9%
1950	1,413		162.6%
1960	3,290		132.8%
1970	6,517		98.1%
1980	7,919		21.5%
1990	8,271		4.4%
2000	8,127		−1.7%
2010	7,443		−8.4%
2020	7,131		−4.2%
2025 (est.)	7,120		−0.2%

=== 2020 census ===
As of the 2020 census, Mentor-on-the-Lake had a population of 7,131. The median age was 44.6 years, 17.1% of residents were under the age of 18, and 20.7% of residents were 65 years of age or older. For every 100 females there were 97.1 males, and for every 100 females age 18 and over there were 94.7 males age 18 and over.

Of the 3,343 households in Mentor-on-the-Lake, 22.6% had children under the age of 18 living in them. Of all households, 38.6% were married-couple households, 22.8% were households with a male householder and no spouse or partner present, and 30.3% were households with a female householder and no spouse or partner present. About 36.2% of all households were made up of individuals and 15.2% had someone living alone who was 65 years of age or older.

There were 3,496 housing units, of which 4.4% were vacant. The homeowner vacancy rate was 1.4% and the rental vacancy rate was 4.3%.

100.0% of residents lived in urban areas, while 0.0% lived in rural areas.

Racial composition as of the 2020 census
Race	Number	Percent
White	6,368	89.3%
Black or African American	171	2.4%
American Indian and Alaska Native	7	0.1%
Asian	107	1.5%
Native Hawaiian and Other Pacific Islander	3	0.0%
Some other race	47	0.7%
Two or more races	428	6.0%
Hispanic or Latino (of any race)	175	2.5%

=== 2010 census ===
At the 2010 census there were 7,443 people in 3,197 households, including 2,012 families, in the city. The population density was 4,623.0 inhabitants per square mile (1,785.0/km^{2}). There were 3,461 housing units at an average density of 2,149.7 per square mile (830.0/km^{2}). The racial makeup of the city was 95.6% White, 1.8% African American, 0.1% Native American, 1.0% Asian, 0.2% from other races, and 1.3% from two or more races. Hispanic or Latino of any race were 1.4%.

Of the 3,197 households 29.2% had children under the age of 18 living with them, 44.3% were married couples living together, 13.3% had a female householder with no husband present, 5.3% had a male householder with no wife present, and 37.1% were non-families. 30.7% of households were one person and 11.2% were one person aged 65 or older. The average household size was 2.33 and the average family size was 2.90.

The median age was 40.3 years. 21.7% of residents were under the age of 18; 8.5% were between the ages of 18 and 24; 26.6% were from 25 to 44; 29.1% were from 45 to 64; and 14.1% were 65 or older. The gender makeup of the city was 49.0% male and 51.0% female.

=== 2000 census ===
At the 2000 census there were 8,127 people in 3,304 households, including 2,230 families, in the city. The population density was 4,976.3 inhabitants per square mile (1,921.4/km^{2}). There were 3,405 housing units at an average density of 2,084.9 per square mile (805.0/km^{2}). The racial makeup of the city was 97.15% Caucasian, 0.81% African American, 0.07% Native American, 0.65% Asian, 0.30% from other races, and 1.02% from two or more races. Hispanic or Latino of any race were 1.19%. 18.3% were of German, 16.3% Irish, 14.0% Italian, 7.7% Polish, 7.4% English and 6.2% American ancestry according to Census 2000.

Of the 3,304 households 31.6% had children under the age of 18 living with them, 52.6% were married couples living together, 10.7% had a female householder with no husband present, and 32.5% were non-families. 26.6% of households were one person and 8.0% were one person aged 65 or older. The average household size was 2.46 and the average family size was 3.00.

The age distribution was 24.6% under the age of 18, 8.6% from 18 to 24, 33.9% from 25 to 44, 22.4% from 45 to 64, and 10.5% 65 or older. The median age was 35 years. For every 100 females, there were 94.8 males. For every 100 females age 18 and over, there were 91.7 males.

The median household income was $44,871 and the median family income was $50,802. Males had a median income of $38,049 versus $26,168 for females. The per capita income for the city was $20,717. About 4.2% of families and 5.7% of the population were below the poverty line, including 6.8% of those under age 18 and 4.6% of those age 65 or over.

== Government ==
Mentor-on-the-Lake has a mayor-council system of government. As of 2024, the mayor is David Eva, a Democrat. The City Council consists of seven members, who are elected for four-year terms. Three members are elected by the city at-large, and four members are elected from wards. As of 2024, the members of the City Council are as follows:

Mentor-on-the-Lake City Council
Seat	Name	Party
Council-at-Large	Michelle Moore	Republican
Council-at-Large	Jim Lunder	Unaffiliated
Council-at-Large	Kevin Bittner	Republican
Ward 1	Virginia Jeannie Wong	Democrat
Ward 2	Skip A. Gray	Republican
Ward 3	Rob Johnson	Republican
Ward 4	Desirea Thompson	Republican

== Education ==
Residents in Mentor-on-the-Lake are zoned to Mentor Public Schools. Most students are zoned to Lake Elementary School, while some are zoned to Orchard Hollow Elementary School. Almost all students are zoned to Shore Middle School, with a small portion of the city zoned to Memorial Middle School. All students are zoned to Mentor High School.
