= Suostas =

- Village
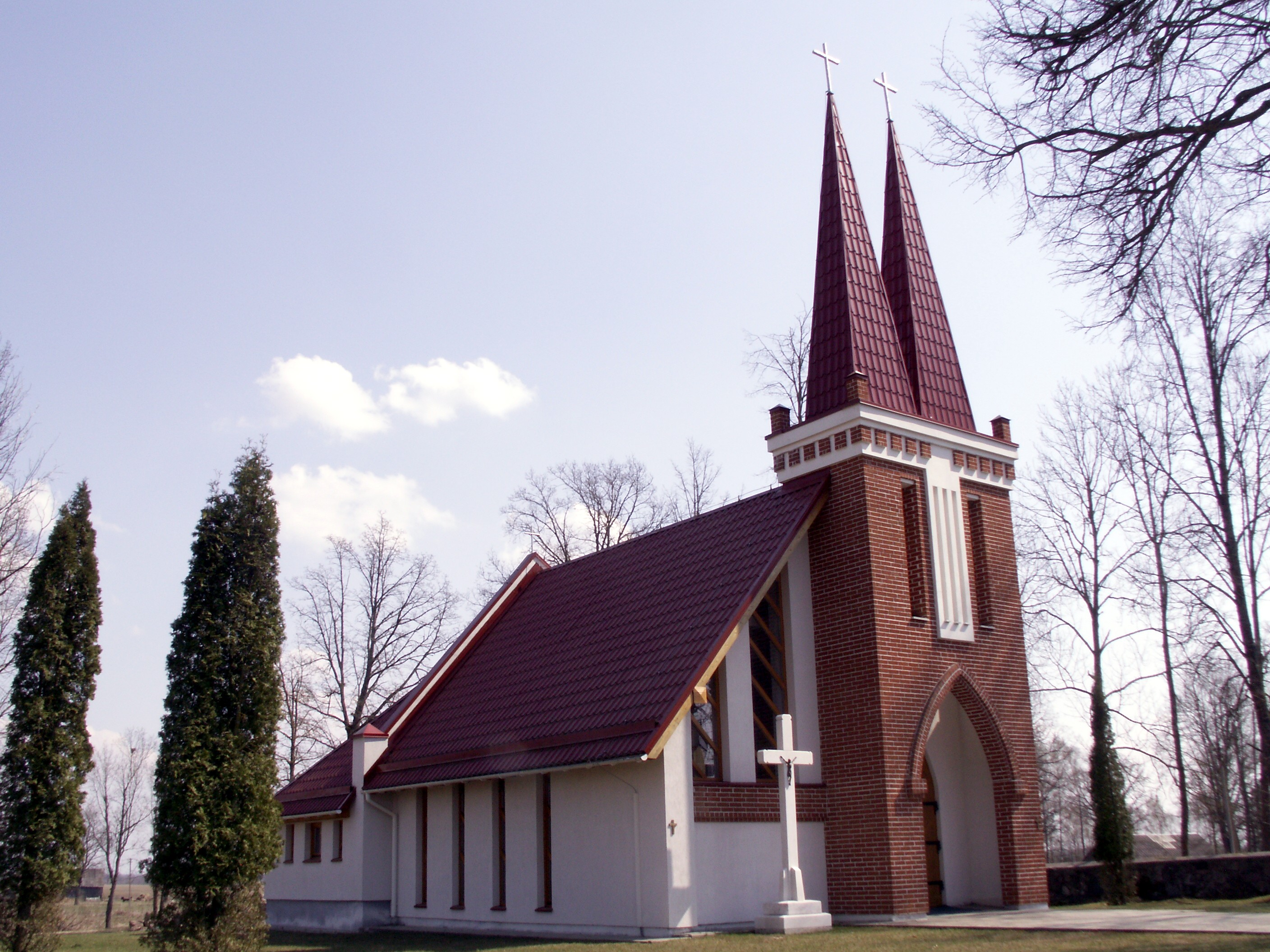

- Location within Lithuania
- Coordinates: 56.327°N 24.712°E
- Country: Lithuania
- County: Panevėžys County

Population
  - Total: 89
- Time zone: Eastern European Time (UTC+2)
  - Summer (DST): Eastern European Summer Time (UTC+3)

Suostas is a village in Biržai District Municipality, Panevėžys County, Lithuania. The population was 89 in 2011.
