= Mentor Public Schools =

School district in Mentor, Ohio, U.S.

Mentor Exempted Village School District
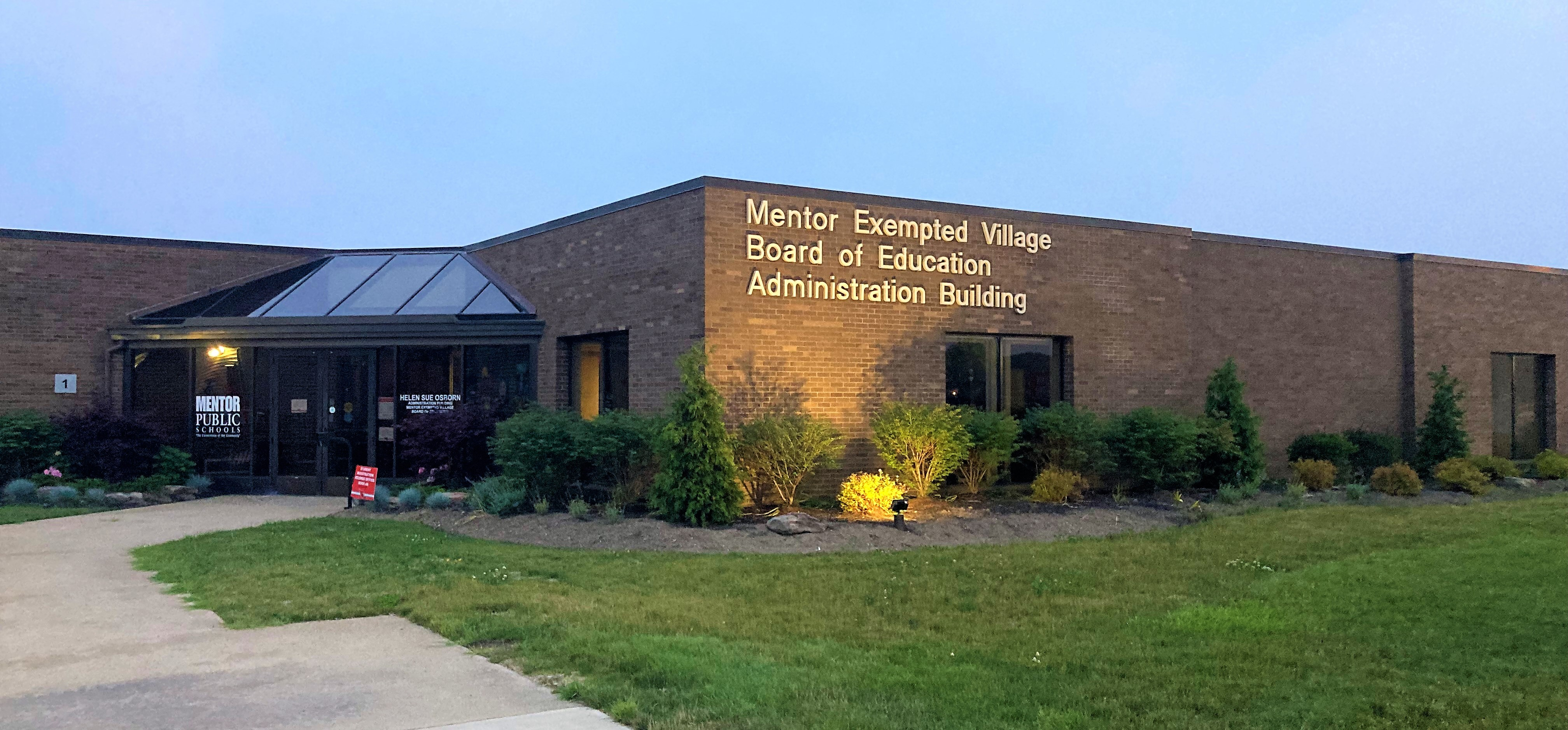

Location
- 6451 Center Street Mentor, Lake County, Ohio, 44060; United States

District information
- Type: Public
- Motto: "Inspiring Students Today to Reach Their Potential Tomorrow"
- Superintendent: Craig Heath
- Asst. superintendent(s): Timothy Hamman
- School board: Maggie A. Cook (President); Virginia E. Jeschlenig (Vice President); Rose M. Ioppolo (Board Member); Lauren M. Marchaza (Board Member); Annie F. Payne (Board Member)
- NCES District ID: 39045493904549

Students and staff
- Teachers: 453.35 (FTE)
- Student–teacher ratio: 16.61

Other information
- Website: www.mentorschools.net

Mentor Exempted Village School District, also known as Mentor Public Schools, is a school district headquartered in Mentor, Ohio. It serves Mentor, Mentor-on-the-Lake, a portion of Kirtland Hills, a portion of Concord Township, and a portion of Chardon Township. As of 2022 it had the district had over 7,700 students and fewer than 1,000 employees.

== Schools ==
=== Early childhood ===
- Integrated Preschool (7090 Hopkins Rd, Mentor)

=== Elementary schools ===
- Bellflower Elementary School (6655 Reynolds Rd, Mentor)
- Fairfax Elementary School (6465 Curtis Rd, Mentor)
- Hopkins Elementary School (7565 Hopkins Rd, Mentor)
- Lake Elementary School (7625 Pinehurst Dr, Mentor-on-the-Lake)
- Orchard Hollow Elementary School (8700 Hendricks Rd, Mentor)
- Ridge Elementary School (7860 Johnnycake Ridge Rd, Mentor)
- Sterling Morton Elementary School (9292 Jordan Dr, Mentor)

=== Middle schools ===
- Memorial Middle School (8979 Mentor Ave, Mentor)
- Shore Middle School (5670 Hopkins Rd, Mentor)

=== High schools ===
- Mentor High School (6477 Center St, Mentor)

=== Special ===
- CARES (School for students with autism, ages 6 to 22) (5028 Forest Rd, Mentor)
