= Paul Ryczek =

American football player (born 1952)

No. 53, 54, 73
- Position: Center

Personal information
- Born: June 25, 1952 (age 74); Painesville, Ohio, U.S.
- Listed height: 6 ft 2 in (1.88 m)
- Listed weight: 230 lb (104 kg)

Career information
- High school: Mentor (Mentor, Ohio)
- College: Virginia
- NFL draft: 1974: 10th round, 252nd overall pick

Career history
- Atlanta Falcons (1974–1979); New Orleans Saints (1981); Philadelphia Eagles (1987)

Awards and highlights
- First-team All-ACC (1973)

Career NFL statistics
- Games played: 99
- Games started: 4
- Stats at Pro Football Reference

Paul Andrew Ryczek (born June 25, 1952) is an American former professional football player who was a center in the National Football League (NFL) for the Atlanta Falcons, New Orleans Saints, and Philadelphia Eagles. He played college football for the Virginia Cavaliers. Ryczek's brother, Dan, also played at the University of Virginia and in the NFL.

After his NFL career, Ryczek founded a construction company called Metaschematics. Ryczek is son of Stanley J. Ryczek (1921–1986) and Helen Gorman Ryczek (1928–2004). He and his wife, Carol, have three children: Zachary, Matthew and Elizabeth, who are all graduates of the University of Georgia.
