= Andrews Osborne Academy =

School in Willoughby, Ohio, United States

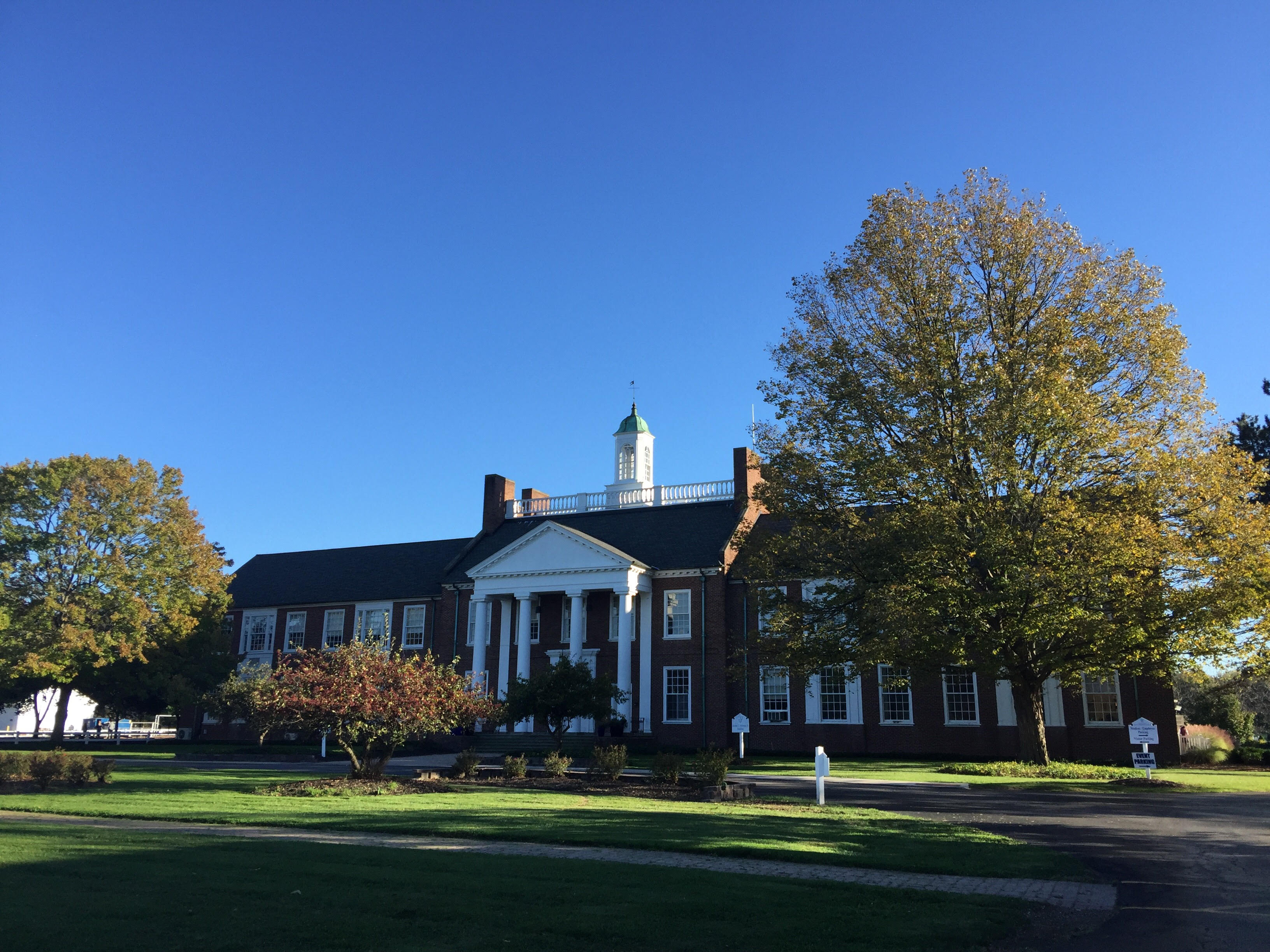

Location
- 38588 Mentor Avenue; Willoughby, (Lake County), Ohio 44094; United States
- 41°38′27″N 81°23′49″W

Information
- Type: Private, Coeducational Day and boarding school
- Established: 1910
- Chairperson: Board Chair: Asha Gowda
- Principal: Director of Lower School: Theresa Frisbie Director of Middle School: Tasha Thompson Director of Upper School: Chris Fox
- Head of school: Gonzalo Garcia-Pedroso
- Faculty: 100
- Teaching staff: 54
- Grades: PK–12
- Enrollment: 350 (2023-2024)
- Average class size: 12
- Student to teacher ratio: 6:1
- Campus size: 300 acres (1.2 km^{2})
- Colors: Navy blue and White and Bright Green
- Athletics: 22 interscholastic offerings
- Athletics conference: Lake Effect Conference
- Mascot: Phoenix
- Nickname: AOA, Andrews
- Team name: Phoenix
- Accreditation: Independent Schools Association of the Central States (ISACS)
- Website: www.andrewsosborne.org

Andrews Osborne Academy (AOA) is a private, coeducational boarding and day school for Grades Pre-K -12 located on 300 acres (1.2 km^{2}) of land in Willoughby, Ohio, twenty miles (32 km) east of Cleveland. The student body is 73% day students and 27% boarding students, 51% male and 49% female, representing 4 states and 20 countries.

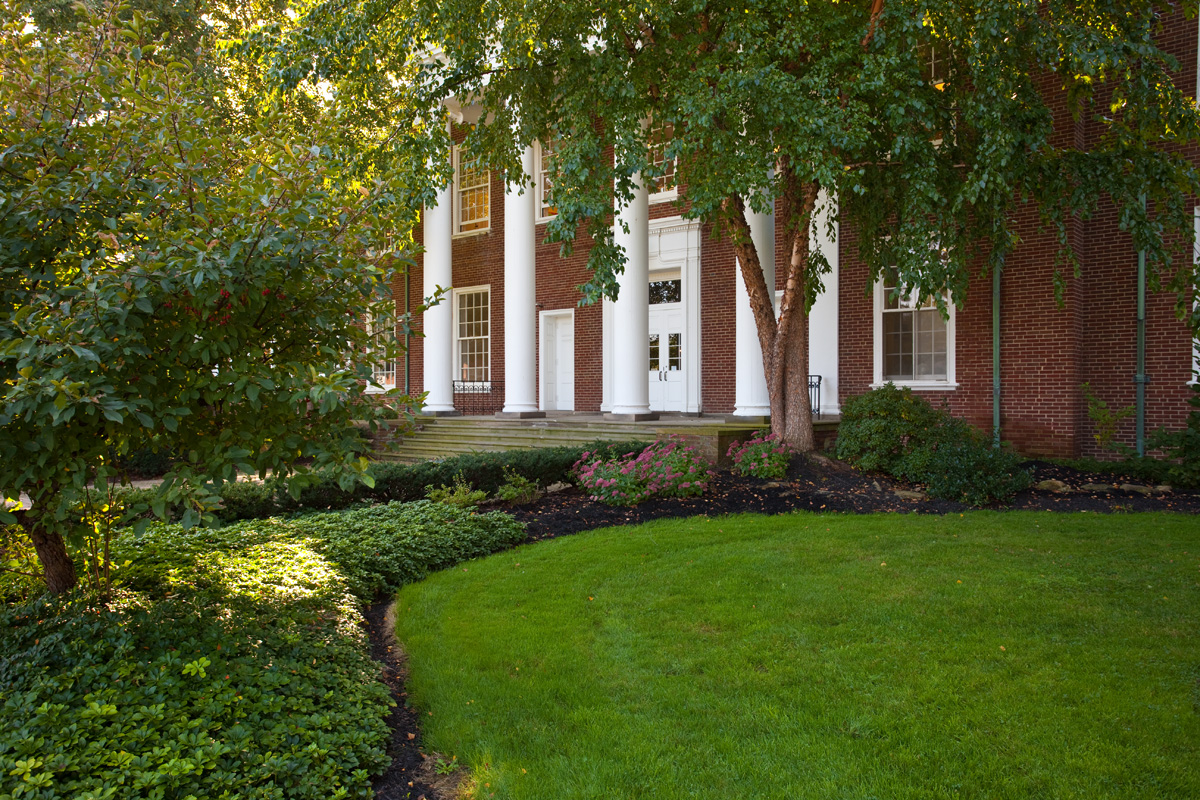
Osborne Building

== Academics ==
118 academic courses and 12 AP classes are offered, with electives that include International Human Rights, Robotics, Game Design and 3D Modeling, Biotechnology, Video and Animation, Electricity, Magnetism and Optics and Portfolio Development.

== Campus ==
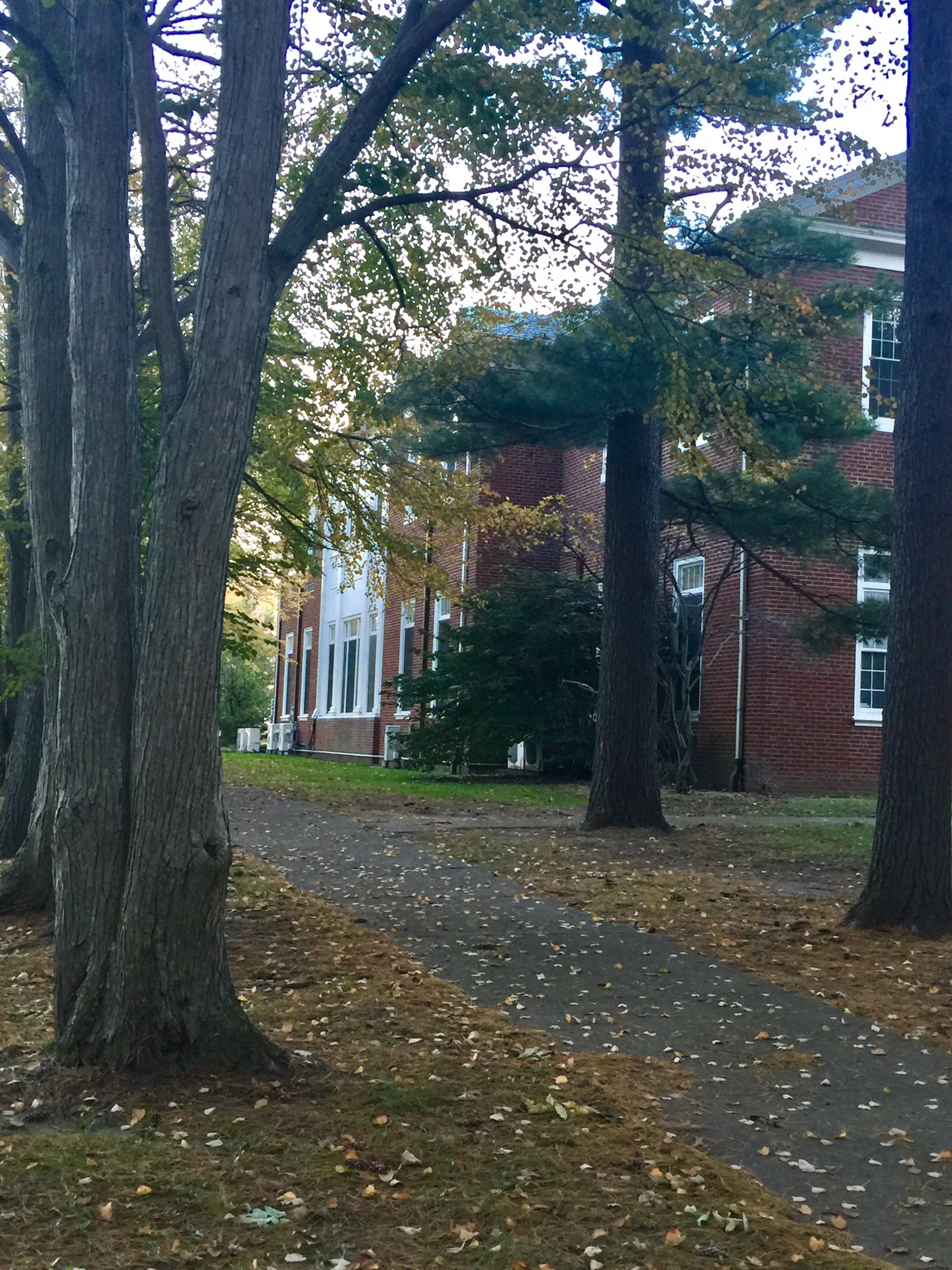
Lee Building - Upper School

Located on 300 acres within walking distance of downtown Willoughby, Ohio, the campus of Andrews Osborne Academy features classroom buildings for the Lower School (PK - Grade 5), Middle School (Grade 6 - Grade 8) and Upper School (Grade 9 - Grade 12), as well as a 658-seat auditorium, 9 computer and science labs, student union, art gallery, 7 dormitories, observatory, and athletic facilities.

== Athletics ==
AOA is a member of the Independent School League (ISL) for middle school and Lake Effect Conference (LEC) for upper school athletics, and competes as a member of the Ohio High School Athletic Association (OHSAA).

=== Ohio High School Athletic Association state championships ===
- Boys' Soccer – 2023

=== Athletic Facilities ===
Close to academic buildings and dormitories are 5 tennis courts, 2 gymnasiums, weight and cardio rooms, outdoor fields for baseball, softball, soccer and lacrosse, a 3.1-mile cross country trail and the Indoor Athletic Center.

Opened in 2015, the Indoor Athletic Center includes a 200 x 100 foot synthetic turf playing surface used for a variety of indoor sports including soccer, baseball and lacrosse. Batting cages and a pitching area are also featured. The complex is used by the AOA community for the training and conditioning of various athletic teams as well as physical education classes. In November 2017, a second synthetic turf playing surface was added to the facility. Athletic facilities are also leveraged by partners Golden Spikes Baseball Organization and Croatia Juniors Cleveland Soccer Club.

=== Athletic Events ===
- AOA Invitational, annual cross country invitational
- Melanie Williams Memorial Tournament, annual basketball tournament

== Partnerships ==
AOA partners with organizations to provide academic and residential components to students training in athletics and the arts.

- The Cleveland Ballet, Pre-professional Ballet
- Fine Arts Association
- The International Sports Academy at Andrews Osborne, Basketball
- Maypine-Flagship Farm, Equestrian

== History ==
In the Fall of 2007, The Andrews School in Willoughby, Ohio and Phillips-Osborne School in Painesville, Ohio merged to form Andrews Osborne Academy on the 300-acre campus of The Andrews School.

The former crest of the Andrews School.

=== The Andrews School ===
Founded in 1910 by Wallace Corydon Andrews and his wife, Margaret St. John Andrews, as The Andrews Institute for Girls. A number of majors were available such as Business, Foods, Retail, Cosmetology, and Clothing. In the early 1980s, The Andrews School became a college preparatory school, and at the time of the merger in 2007, served girls in grades 7–12.

=== The Phillips-Osborne School ===
Founded in 1972 as The Phillips School in Painesville, Ohio and renamed Phillips-Osborne School in 1992. At the time of the merger in 2007, it was a co-ed school for PK - Grade 8.
