= Michael Salinger =

American poet

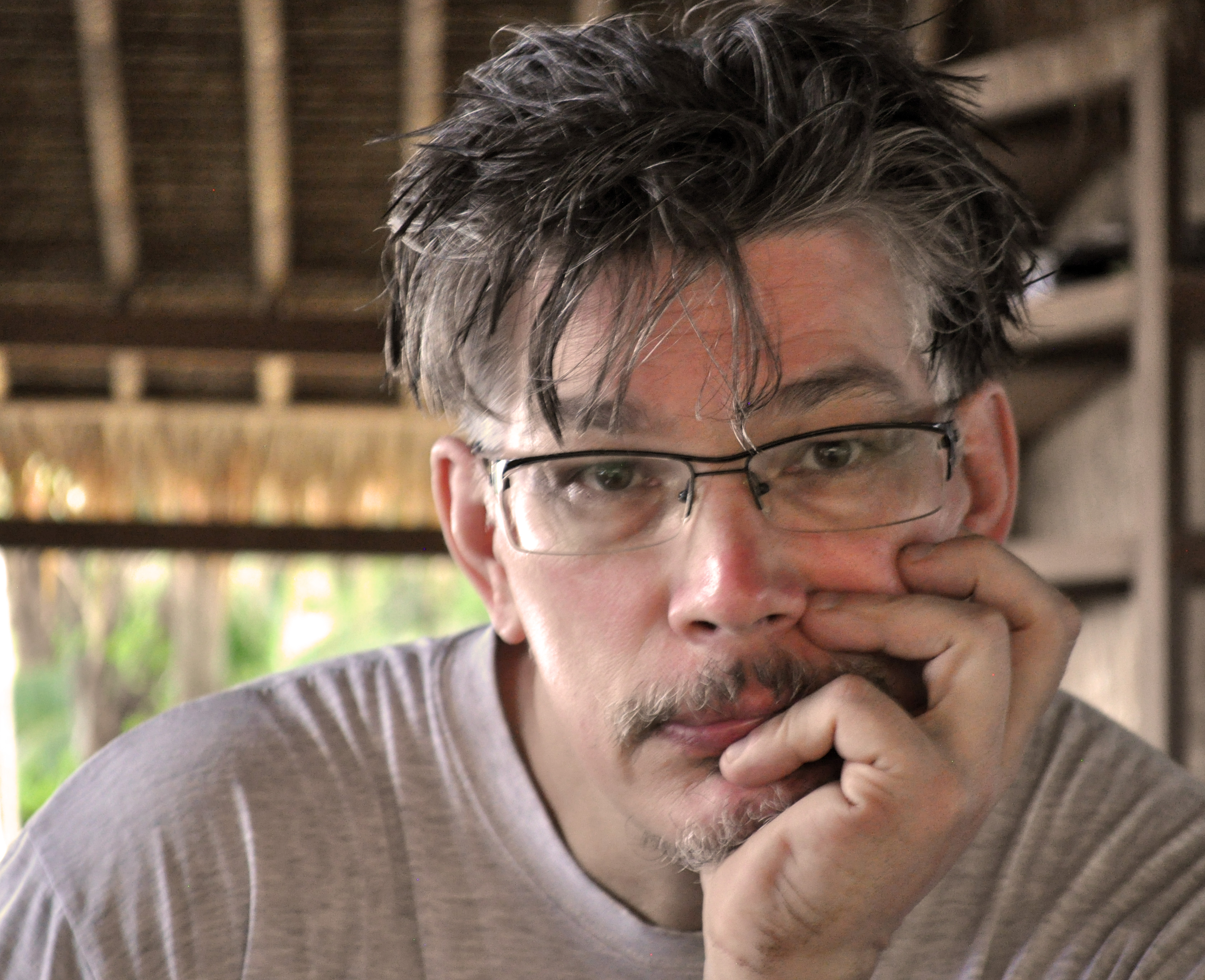
- Born: March 2, 1962 (age 64)

Michael Salinger (born March 2, 1962) is an American poet, performer, and educator living in Northeast Ohio. He is one of the earliest participants in the National Poetry Slam, former board member oforganization's summer writing and performance conference. He is the author of teacher professional books and a frequent speaker at teacher conferences and in schools in the US and abroad where he uses performance poetry as a means to better literacy and comprehension skills.

Salinger was a member or coach of the team representing Cleveland, Ohio at the National Poetry Slam a dozen times - making two finals stage appearances. He also emceed the individual finals competition of the National Poetry Slam on several occasions.

He is the founding director of Poetry Slam Inc.'s Poetry Cross-training Conference - a writing and performance seminar held on the campus of SUNY Oneonta the last week of June.

Salinger is the founding instructor of the Slam U program of the Playhouse Square Foundation in Cleveland Ohio, the second largest performing arts institution after Broadway. Here students learn writing and performance skills and have the opportunity to represent the city at Brave New Voices, the youth national poetry slam.

Salinger began performing his poetry in the mid 1980s in and around Cleveland Ohio at venues such as the Pearl Road Auto Wrecking Junkstock festivals, created by Daniel Thompson, and Macs Backs paperbacks in the eclectic Coventry neighborhood. He gravitated into the poetry slam scene by default as it was just starting to take hold. His stage appearances became more elaborate taking cues from the Dada movement and eventually began involving a cast of characters and makeshift scripts and stage directions resulting in the performance art troupe The Nova Lizard Project during the late 1980s and early 1990s. During this time he married and had two children.

== Publications ==
=== Poetry collections ===
- Big Machines and Wheeled Things - 1986 Burning Press
- RiZZ – 1989 Burning Press
- The One That Got Away – 1994 Wee Albert Press
- Sunday Morning – 1999 – Burning Press
- Neon – 2002 – Bottom Dog Press ( BGSU Firelands)
- They Call it Fishing Not Catching – 2004 – Wordsmith Press
- Stingray - 2007 - Wordsmith Press
- Well Defined - Vocabulary in Rhyme - Spring of 2009 - Boyd's Mills Press (Illustrated by Sam Henderson)
- A Bear in the Kitchen - 2013 - Red Giant Books

=== Professional books ===
- Outspoken: How to Improve Writing and Speaking Skills Through Poetry Performance - 2006 - Heinemann
- High Definition: Unforgettable Vocabulary-Building Strategies Across Genres and Subjects - 2010 - Heinemann
- High Impact Writing Clinics - 2013 - Corwin Literacy
- From Striving to Thriving Writers: Strategies to Jump Start Writing - 2018 - Scholastic

== Personal life ==
He currently lives in Ohio with children’s author Sara Holbrook.
