= Dan Ryczek =

American football player (born 1949)

No. 51, 54
- Position: Center

Personal information
- Born: August 24, 1949 (age 77); Painesville, Ohio, U.S.
- Listed height: 6 ft 3 in (1.91 m)
- Listed weight: 249 lb (113 kg)

Career information
- High school: Mentor (OH)
- College: Virginia
- NFL draft: 1971: 13th round, 322nd overall pick

Career history
- Washington Redskins (1973–1975); Tampa Bay Buccaneers (1976–1977); Los Angeles Rams (1978–1979)

Awards and highlights
- First-team All-ACC (1970)

Career NFL statistics
- Games played: 102
- Games started: 26
- Fumble recoveries: 4
- Stats at Pro Football Reference

Daniel Stanley Ryczek (born August 24, 1949) is an American former professional football player who was an offensive lineman in the National Football League (NFL) for the Washington Redskins, Tampa Bay Buccaneers, and Los Angeles Rams, his last game was playing for the Rams in Super Bowl XIV.

== Football career ==
Ryczek played at Mentor High School in Ohio. He played college football at the University of Virginia, where he was the 1970 co-captain and received the 1970 Jacobs Blocking Trophy as the best blocking offensive lineman. Ryczek was selected 322nd overall in the thirteenth round of the 1971 NFL draft by the Washington Redskins and Head Coach George Allen. In the Expansion draft in 1976, he was selected by the new Tampa Bay Buccaneers. In 1978, he was traded to the Los Angeles Rams, back to George Allen, the new head coach or the Rams.

His brother Paul also played for Virginia and in the NFL.
