= Dave Lucas (poet) =

American poet and essayist (born 1980)

- Born: September 29, 1980 (age 45); Cleveland, Ohio, U.S.
- Education: John Carroll University (BA); University of Virginia (MFA); University of Michigan (MA, PhD)
- Occupations: Poet, essayist

Dave Lucas (born September 29, 1980) is an American poet and essayist. He was the second Poet Laureate of the state of Ohio.

== Early life and education ==
Lucas was born and raised in Cleveland, Ohio. He earned his B.A. at John Carroll University, M.F.A. in creative writing at the University of Virginia, and M.A. and Ph.D. in English language and literature at the University of Michigan.

== Career ==
Lucas's first poetry collection, Weather, was published in 2011 by University of Georgia Press and was awarded the 2012 Ohioana Book Award for Poetry. Shortly after publication, former U.S. Poet Laureate Rita Dove named him as one of thirteen “young poets to watch.” His poetry has been anthologized in The Bedford Introduction to Literature and Best New Poets 2005, and has appeared in such journals as The American Poetry Review, Blackbird, The Paris Review, Poetry, Slate, The Threepenny Review and Virginia Quarterly Review. He has reviewed books for The Plain Dealer and his essays have appeared in Granta and Virginia Quarterly Review, among other publications.

Lucas has taught at Case Western Reserve University, the Cleveland Clinic's Program in Medical Humanities, the Cleveland Clinic Lerner College of Medicine, the John Carroll Young Writers Workshop, and the Sweet Briar Creative Writing Conference.

=== Brews and Prose Literary Series ===
In 2012, Lucas co-founded Brews and Prose, a monthly literary series hosted at Market Garden Brewery. He served as the program's Creative Director from its inception through 2017.

=== Ohio Poet Laureate ===
In January 2018, Ohio Governor John Kasich named Lucas the state's second poet laureate, succeeding Amit Majmudar. Lucas was recommended for the two-year position after a statewide nominating process by the Ohio Poet Laureate Selection Committee.

== Honors and awards ==
- Ohio Poet Laureate, 2018 – 2019
- Cleveland Arts Prize Emerging Artist Award, 2016
- Ohioana Book Award for Poetry, 2012
- Discovery/The Nation, the Joan Leiman Jacobson Poetry Prize, 2005

== Books ==
- Weather, Athens: The University of Georgia Press, 2011. ISBN 978-0-8203-3882-8
