= Mentor, Ohio =

- City
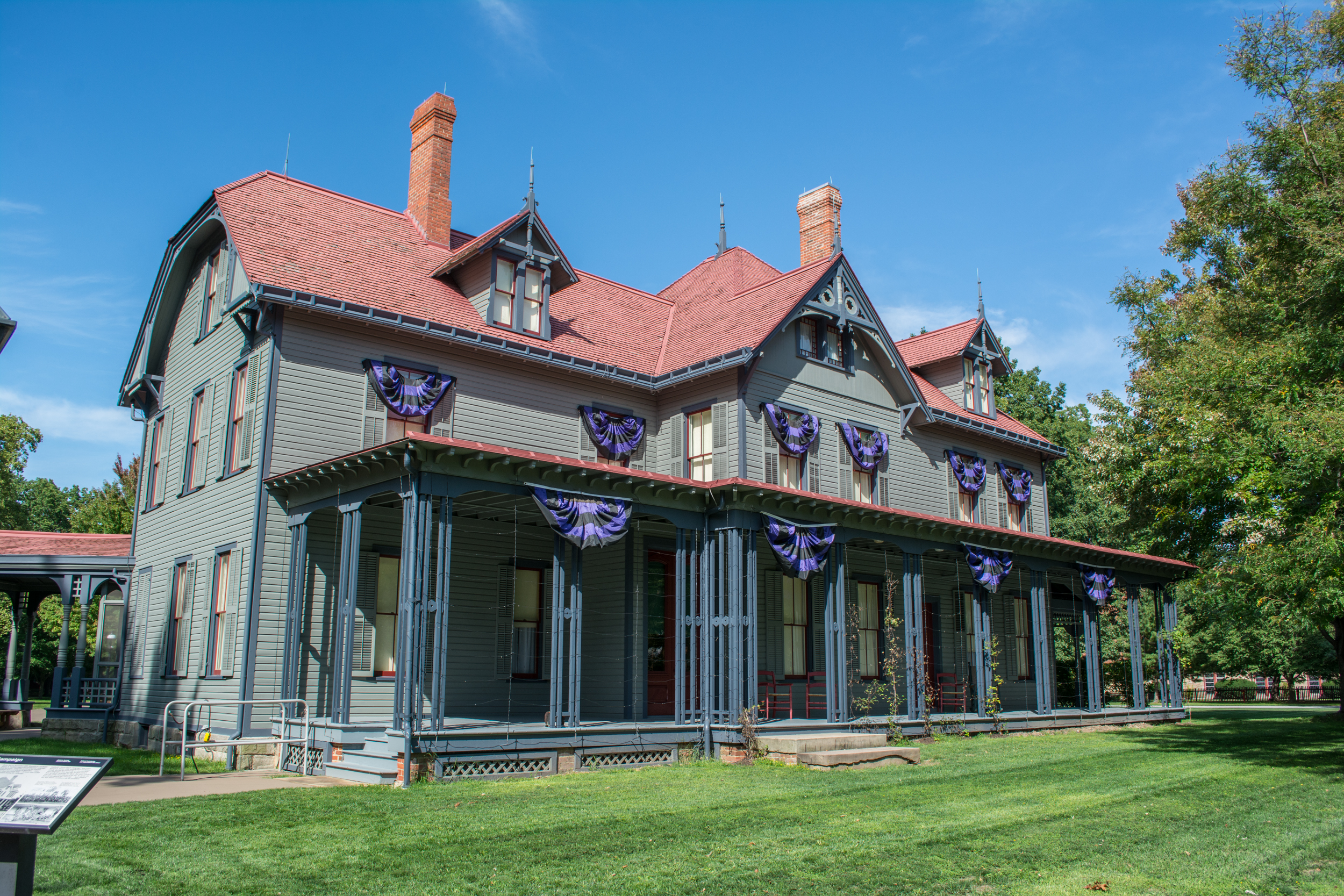
- James A. Garfield National Historic Site

- Flag Seal
- Motto: "The City of Choice"
- Interactive map of Mentor, Ohio
- Location within Ohio Location within the United States
- Coordinates: 41°41′28″N 81°20′31″W
- Country: United States
- State: Ohio
- County: Lake

Government
  - Type: Council-manager
  - Council President: Sean P. Blake (R)

Area
  - Total: 27.99 sq mi (72.50 km^{2})
  - Land: 27.80 sq mi (71.99 km^{2})
  - Water: 0.20 sq mi (0.51 km^{2})
- Elevation: 630 ft (190 m)

Population (2020)
  - Total: 47,450
  - Density: 1,707.0/sq mi (659.09/km^{2})
- Demonym: Mentorite
- Time zone: UTC−5 (Eastern (EST))
  - Summer (DST): UTC−4 (EDT)
- ZIP codes: 44060-44061
- Area code: 440 436
- FIPS code: 39-49056
- GNIS feature ID: 1086425
- Website: cityofmentor.com

Mentor (/ˈmɛntər/ MEN-tər; also, /ˈmɛnnər/ MEN-nər) is a city located in Lake County, Ohio, United States. It is situated on the south shore of Lake Erie. A suburb northeast of Cleveland, Ohio, it is part of the Greater Cleveland metropolitan area. Its population during the 2020 census was 47,450. Mentor (also known as Mentor City) is the most populous city in Lake County, Ohio.

Mentor was settled in 1797. In 1876, James A. Garfield purchased a home there, from which he conducted the first successful front porch campaign for the United States presidency in 1880; the house is now maintained as the James A. Garfield National Historic Site. The city is home to Headlands Beach State Park, the longest public swimming beach in Ohio.

The city is a major center of retail stores and restaurants. Mentor Avenue (US 20) is the city's commercial corridor, which includes Great Lakes Mall, and additional shopping is found along most major roads. Manufacturing in the city includes medical products, polymers, plastics, electric boards, and other peripherals that generally serve the computer and automation industries. Convenient Food Mart and medical equipment company Steris are based in Mentor. CSX Transportation and Norfolk Southern railroads both pass through the city.

== Name ==
Mentor is named after the Greek figure Mentor, in keeping with the Connecticut Western Reserve settlers' tradition, as well as that of most other Americans at the time, of celebrating aspects of Greek classicism. Nearby Solon, Macedonia, Euclid, and Akron received similar historic names.

The pronunciation of Mentor varies, with many residents pronouncing it as "men-ner" and outsiders using the more conventional "men-tore", while in the media and among most residents, "men-ter" is prominent. The city's former slogan, "It's better in Mentor," reflects this fact.

== History ==
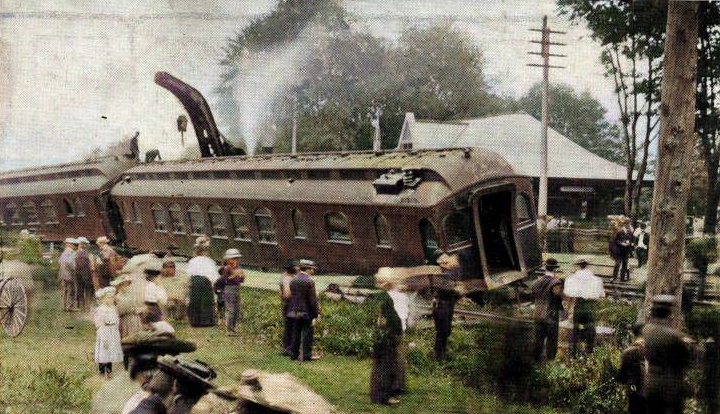
20th Century Limited derailment, 1905

Mentor was founded in the late eighteenth century by Charles Parker, who built the first settlement in 1797. Ohio became the 17th state in the Union in 1803. The community was formally established in 1855, and earned the nickname "Rose Capital of the Nation" due to the abundant rosebushes that grew throughout the city. During the time this nickname developed, Mentor's tourist industry boomed due to Clevelanders trying to escape a dirty, industrial atmosphere. With the post-World War II spread of the automobile, Mentor saw an increase in middle and working-class families. By 2000, about 50,000 people lived in the city.

=== Flag ===
The flag of the City of Mentor was designed by Brad Frost in 1988 for a contest by Mentor Headlands. The flag's appearance resembles the State of Ohio's, with a similar shape, a large blue triangle, and stripes. The blue triangle represents Ohio's hills while the stripes represent roads and waterways. There is a white circle, symbolizing Ohio, with a Northern cardinal, the official bird of Ohio and Mentor, sitting in the middle. There are six stars surrounding the circle symbolizing the 6 original townships, including Mentor, surveyed in 1797.

== Geography ==
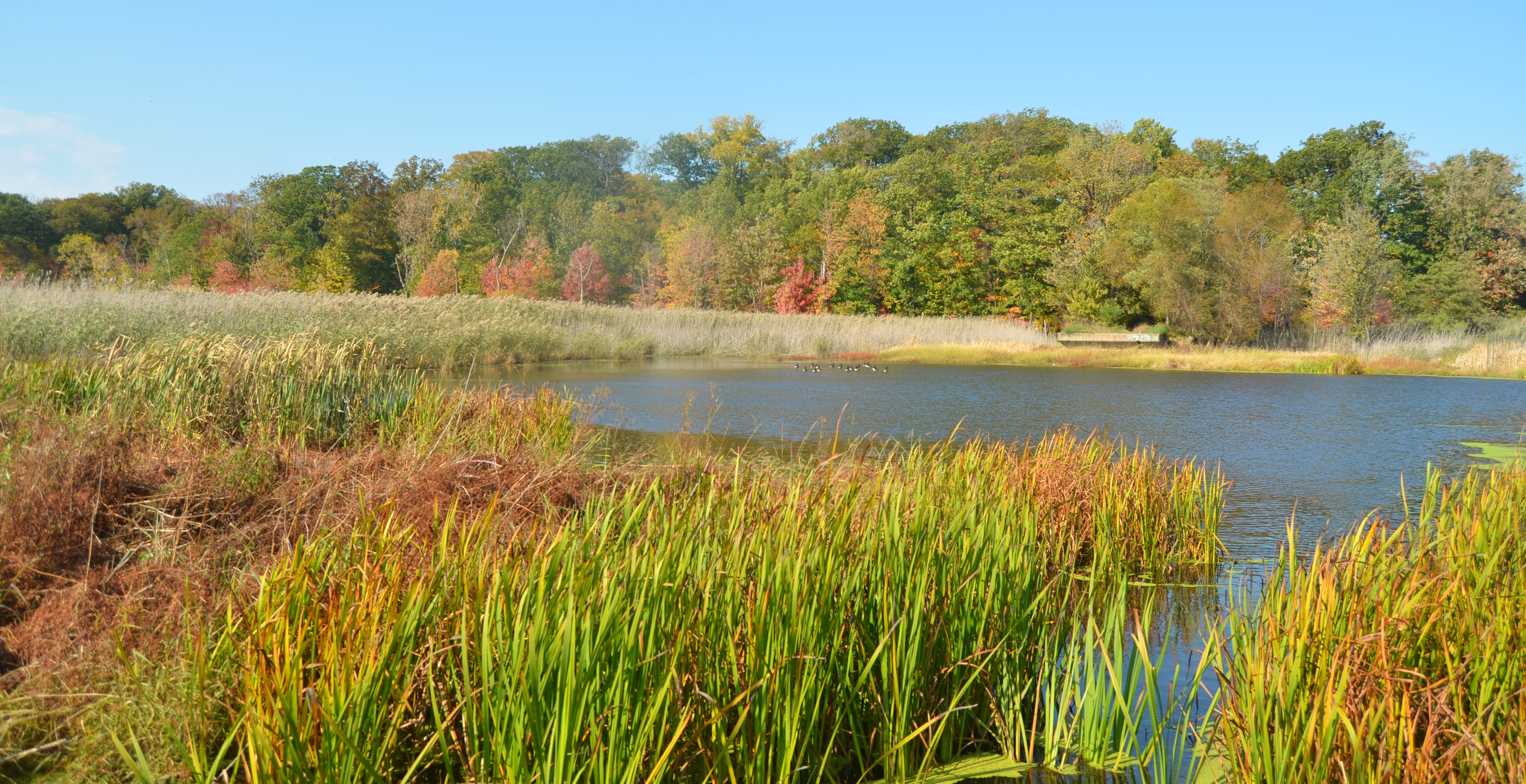
Mentor Marsh Nature Preserve

Mentor is a suburb of Cleveland and is located on the south shore of Lake Erie. The Mentor Headlands area of Mentor, located in the northeast portion of the city, was settled in 1797 by Connecticut Land Company surveyors.

According to the United States Census Bureau, the city has a total area of 28.00 square miles (72.52 km^{2}), of which 26.65 square miles (69.02 km^{2}) is land and 1.35 square miles (3.50 km^{2}) is water.

=== Climate ===
The average temperature in Mentor is 49.90 °F which is comparable to the Ohio average temperature of 50.88 °F but lower than the national average of 54.45 °F. The annual average for precipitation is 42.87 inches which is higher than the national and state average, Mentor averages 93.4 days with more than .1 inches of rain. This is higher than Ohio's average of 80 days. Mentor expects about 61.25 days with 1 or more inches of snow. The wind average is 18.61 mph and humidity is 75.82%.

== Demographics ==
Historical population
Census	Pop.	Note	%±
1870	416		—
1880	540		29.8%
1890	502		−7.0%
1900	624		24.3%
1910	732		17.3%
1920	851		16.3%
1930	1,589		86.7%
1940	1,827		15.0%
1950	2,383		30.4%
1960	4,354		82.7%
1970	36,912		747.8%
1980	41,903		13.5%
1990	47,358		13.0%
2000	50,278		6.2%
2010	47,159		−6.2%
2020	47,450		0.6%

=== 2020 census ===
As of the 2020 census, Mentor had a population of 47,450. The median age was 48.0 years. 18.4% of residents were under the age of 18 and 23.8% of residents were 65 years of age or older. For every 100 females there were 93.9 males, and for every 100 females age 18 and over there were 91.7 males age 18 and over.

100.0% of residents lived in urban areas, while 0.0% lived in rural areas.

There were 20,251 households in Mentor, of which 23.7% had children under the age of 18 living in them. Of all households, 52.4% were married-couple households, 16.1% were households with a male householder and no spouse or partner present, and 25.9% were households with a female householder and no spouse or partner present. About 28.8% of all households were made up of individuals and 15.1% had someone living alone who was 65 years of age or older.

There were 21,074 housing units, of which 3.9% were vacant. The homeowner vacancy rate was 1.1% and the rental vacancy rate was 6.1%.

Racial composition as of the 2020 census
Race	Number	Percent
White	43,520	91.7%
Black or African American	715	1.5%
American Indian and Alaska Native	56	0.1%
Asian	787	1.7%
Native Hawaiian and Other Pacific Islander	0	0.0%
Some other race	285	0.6%
Two or more races	2,087	4.4%
Hispanic or Latino (of any race)	996	2.1%

=== 2010 census ===
As of the census of 2010, there were 47,159 people, 19,166 households, and 13,339 families residing in the city. The population density was 1,769.6 inhabitants per square mile (683.2/km^{2}). There were 20,218 housing units at an average density of 758.6 per square mile (292.9/km^{2}). The racial makeup of the city was 96.3% White, 1.0% African American, 0.1% Native American, 1.4% Asian, 0.3% from other races, and 1.0% from two or more races. Hispanic or Latino of any race were 1.3% of the population.

There were 19,166 households, of which 28.8% had children under the age of 18 living with them, 56.4% were married couples living together, 9.4% had a female householder with no husband present, 3.8% had a male householder with no wife present, and 30.4% were non-families. 25.7% of all households were made up of individuals, and 11.1% had someone living alone who was 65 years of age or older. The average household size was 2.44 and the average family size was 2.94.

The median age in the city was 44.8 years. 21.2% of residents were under the age of 18; 6.9% were between the ages of 18 and 24; 22.3% were from 25 to 44; 33.2% were from 45 to 64; and 16.5% were 65 years of age or older. The gender makeup of the city was 48.4% male and 51.6% female.

=== 2000 census ===
As of the census of 2000, there were 50,278 people, 18,797 households, and 14,229 families residing in the city. The population density was 1,878.2 inhabitants per square mile (725.2/km^{2}). There were 19,301 housing units at an average density of 721.0 per square mile (278.4/km^{2}). The racial makeup of the city was 97.30% White, 0.64% African American, 0.05% Native American, 1.19% Asian, 0.03% Pacific Islander, 0.18% from other races, and 0.61% from two or more races. Hispanic or Latino of any race were 0.72% of the population. 19.8% were of German, 15.1% Italian, 13.1% Irish, 8.8% English, 6.5% Polish, 5.5% Slovene and 5.4% American ancestry according to Census 2000.

There were 18,797 households, out of which 35.8% had children under the age of 18 living with them, 63.6% were married couples living together, 8.9% had a female householder with no husband present, and 24.3% were non-families. 20.5% of all households were made up of individuals, and 8.1% had someone living alone who was 65 years of age or older. The average household size was 2.65 and the average family size was 3.08.

In the city the population was spread out, with 25.9% under the age of 18, 6.5% from 18 to 24, 29.0% from 25 to 44, 26.3% from 45 to 64, and 12.3% who were 65 years of age or older. The median age was 39 years. For every 100 females, there were 94.2 males. For every 100 females age 18 and over, there were 91.5 males age 18 and over.

The median income for a household in the city was $57,230, and the median income for a family was $65,322. Males had a median income of $44,021 versus $31,025 for females. The per capita income for the city was $24,592. About 1.8% of families and 2.7% of the population were below the poverty line, including 2.8% of those under age 18 and 4.4% of those age 65 or over.

== Government ==
Mentor has a council-manager system of government. The City Council consists of seven members, who are elected for four-year terms. Three members are elected by the city at-large, and four members are elected from wards. As of 2024, the members of the City Council are as follows:

Mentor City Council
Seat	Name	Party
Council-at-Large	Janet Dowling	Republican
Council-at-Large	Scott Marn	Republican
Council-at-Large	Ray Kirchner	Independent
Ward 1	Sean Blake	Republican
Ward 2	Matthew Donovan	Democrat
Ward 3	Mark Freeman	Republican
Ward 4	John Krueger	Republican

== Education ==
=== Mentor Public Schools ===
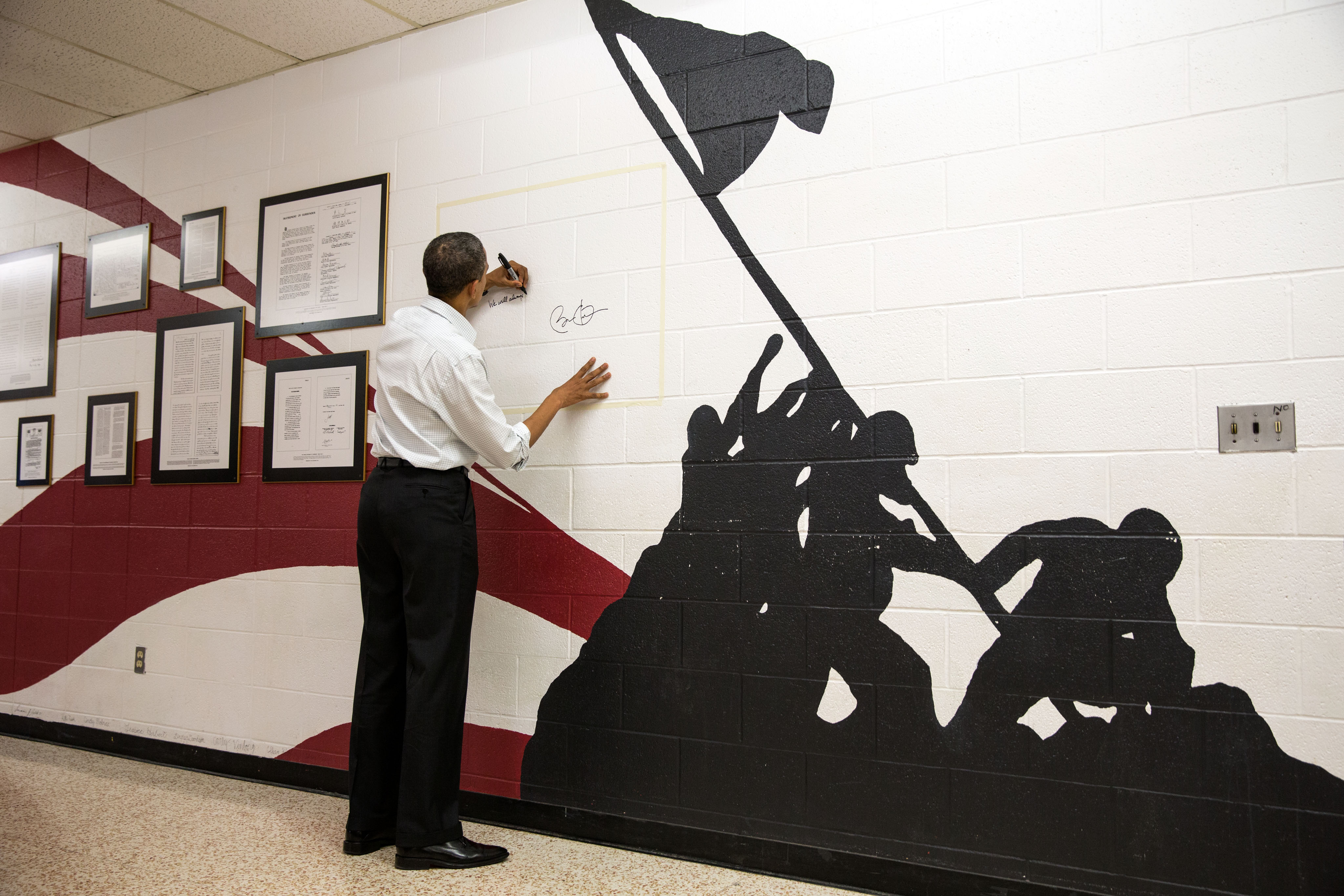
President Barack Obama at Mentor High School in 2012

Mentor Exempted Village School District operates the public schools in the community. Mentor's school system consists of eight elementary schools, two middle schools, and Mentor High School. Like many school systems in Ohio, Mentor Schools suffered a financial crisis in the early 2000s, but passed a large levy and is now largely on solid footing. It is one of the fastest Ohio school systems ever to emerge from fiscal emergency. The financial difficulties were due in part to years of accounting fraud.

Elementary schools:

- Bellflower Elementary
- Fairfax Elementary
- Hopkins Elementary
- Lake Elementary (in Mentor-on-the-Lake)
- Orchard Hollow Elementary
- Ridge Elementary (Formerly Ridge Middle School)
- Sterling Morton Elementary

Middle schools:

- Memorial Middle School
- Shore Middle School

High school:

- Mentor High School

Special needs schools:

- CARES (Formerly Headlands Elementary)
- Re-Education Services Inc. (Formerly Reynolds Elementary)

=== Private schools ===
- Lake Catholic High School
- Mentor Christian School (K–12)
- Mentor Heritage Christian Academy (K–12) (closed in 2010)
- Assumption Prep (K–8)

== Parks and recreation ==
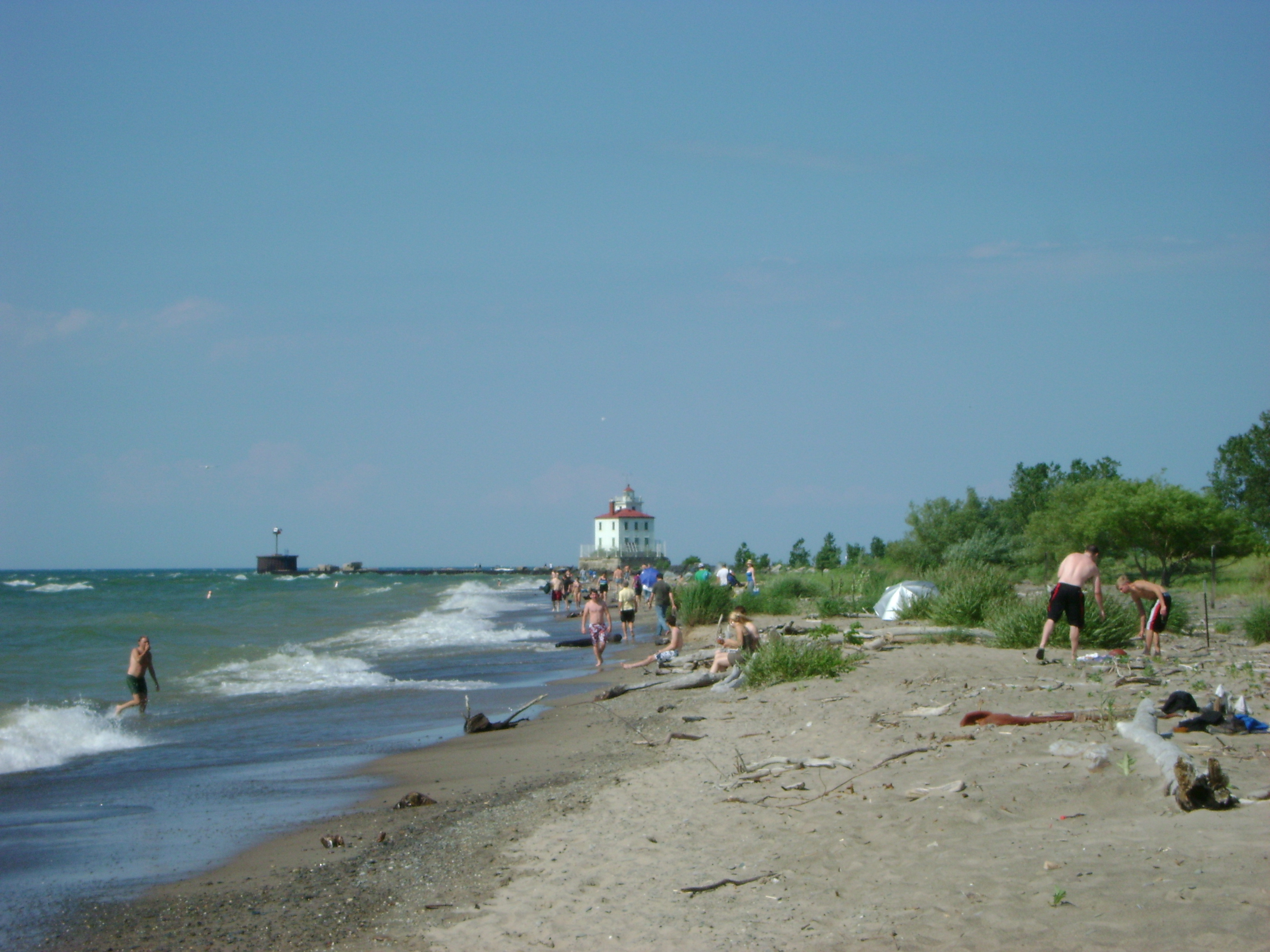
Headlands Beach State Park

Many bike paths have been built in Mentor in recent years. The parks in the city include:

- Bellflower Skatepark
  - Located at Bellflower Elementary School. During daylight hours, skateboarders can use the park's ¼ pipe, launch ramp and grind box.
- Civic Center Park
  - Site of many festivals, day camps, and annual Fourth of July Fireworks. Includes the Civic Center water park with an Olympic sized pool, waterslide, children's play area, and Civic Arena.
- Commemorative Rose Garden
  - This garden was constructed in 1988 and commemorates Mentor's 25th year as a city.
- Donald E Krueger Park
  - Features a pavilion, four soccer fields, and indoor or outdoor seating.
- Edward R. Walsh Park
  - Formerly known as Bellflower park, it includes a playground, rentable pavilion, fishing pond, skatepark, fitness course, basketball courts, baseball and soccer fields.
- Eleanor B Garfield Park
  - One of the largest parks including a Community Recreation Center, outdoor pool, All People's Playground, baseball and soccer fields, basketball and tennis courts, fishing pond, and wildlife area.
- Headlands Beach State Park
  - The longest beach in the State of Ohio.
- Mentor Beach Park
  - Scenic park overlooking Lake Erie with a playground, lake front pavilion, and soccer field.
- Mentor Dog Park
  - Separated fenced in areas for large or small dogs with a dog water fountain and benches.
- Mentor Lagoons Nature Preserve & Marina
  - Located on the shores of Lake Erie with multiple hiking and biking trails giving views to the Mentor Marsh, marina, shoreline, and rare dune plants.
- Morton Community Park
  - Easily access to walking trails, wildlife, and scenery since it is next to the Mentor Marsh Nature Preserve. Additionally, it houses Morton Pool and Spray park, a pavilion, skatepark, and basketball courts.
- Presidents Park
  - Neighborhood park with a pavilion, playground, basketball and tennis courts.
- Tiefenbach Park
  - Provides ramps to skaters and bikers.
- Veteran's Memorial
  - Designed and built by city employees and dedicated as a tribute to veterans in 2006. Features 5 flags representing the 5 divisions of the armed forces and 5 benches facing a brick wall to represent the circle of life. The opportunity to purchase a brick in memoriam of a fallen veteran and placed in the Memorial Walkway is available.
- Veteran's Park
  - Mentor's first neighborhood park offers fishing piers, hiking trails, and wildlife viewing area.
- Wildwood Cultural Center & Park
  - Home to Mentor’s Oliver family manor built in 1908 and bought buy Mentor in 1980. Offers programs, used for weddings, business meetings, seminars, Parties and showers. The 34 acre estate offers hiking trails

== Crime ==
In 2016, Mentor's rate of 1.1 violent crimes per 1,000 residents was equal to the average (median) among Ohio cities. However, its rate of 22.1 property crimes per 1,000 residents was higher than the state median of 18.3 per 1,000 people. The property crime rate was high primarily due to the incidence of theft (larceny) in the city.

In 2014, Garden Thieves Pictures released Mentor, a documentary directed by Alix Lambert about a series of four student suicides beginning in 2010 at Mentor High School that have been attributed to bullying and harassment at the school. Lambert received ten violent threats after the release of the film's trailer. The Boston Globe wrote about the documentary, saying "This is a problem of not just one town, but of the entire culture of conformity. It’s much bigger than just one bad kid or bad teacher. In my films I'm interested in looking at the whole problem rather than the easy answers." The Daily Beast called Mentor High School "Suicide High."

== Media ==
Primarily receiving the Cleveland-area television market, Mentor residents (being so much further east of Cleveland) can also receive Youngstown-area television reception from WFMJ-TV with a good antenna. This allowed access to NBC programming pre-empted by KYW-TV from 1956 until 1965, when Cleveland's channel 3 was owned by Westinghouse Broadcasting, before the sale was undone and it returned to NBC ownership as WKYC.

== Transportation ==
Mentor is served by Laketran, which provides bus service throughout Lake County, as well as by Willoughby's Lake County Executive Airport, whose runways enter Mentor. Interstate 90, US Route 20, and State Route 2 all traverse the city.

== Notable people ==
- Marc Andreyko, comic book writer
- Barbara Armonas, Lithuanian political prisoner
- Ken Babbs, author
- Jim Bonfanti, musician
- William W. Corning, politician
- James A. Garfield, twentieth president of the United States of America
- Bob Hallen, former NFL offensive lineman for the Atlanta Falcons
- Bob Harris, writer
- Joe Jurevicius, former NFL wide receiver for the New York Giants
- Matt Kata, former Major League Baseball infielder
- Ben Kelly, former NFL cornerback for the Miami Dolphins
- Dustin Kirby, former MLS defender for Real Salt Lake
- Dave Lucas, poet
- Dan Ryczek, former NFL offensive lineman for the Washington Commanders
- Paul Ryczek, former NFL offensive lineman for the Atlanta Falcons
- Michael Salinger, poet
- Riley Ann Sawyers ("Baby Grace"), murder victim
- Katie Spotz, endurance rower
- Ricky Stanzi, former NFL quarterback for the Kansas City Chiefs
- Jim Tressel, former Ohio State University football coach
- Mitchell Trubisky, NFL quarterback for the Tennessee Titans
- Matt Van Epps, U.S. Representative for Tennessee's 7th congressional district
- Walter Wellman, American journalist, explorer, and aeronaut
- David Wilcox, singer/songwriter
- Matt Wickline, Emmy-winning television writer, producer and director, and father of Saturday Night Live cast member Jane Wickline
