= Gildersleeve Mountain =

Mountain in Ohio, United States

Coordinates: 41°35′39″N 81°21′33″W

Gildersleeve Mountain is a summit located in Kirtland, Ohio, United States.

Gildersleeve Mountain is within one of the largest and most densely populated metropolitan areas in the United States (regional population 2.9 million). It is a relatively unspoiled area just 18 miles (29 km) from downtown Cleveland. It is one of only two natural areas with higher elevations and unique rock outcroppings. Little Mountain, which is near the Holden Arboretum, is similar to Gildersleeve Mountain but is accessible on guided walks only. Gildersleeve Mountain is located in the Chapin Forest Reservation of Lake Metroparks and is referred to as the "scenic overlook".

== Geography ==
Location relative to downtown Cleveland and Lake Erie

The summit of Gildersleeve Mountain is 1,163 feet (354 m) above sea level. 593 feet (181 m) above Lake Erie. The shoreline of Lake Erie is approximately 6.7 miles (10.8 km) north west of the summit.

Gildersleeve Mountain marks the beginning of the Allegheny Plateau in the area. Its northern slopes transition down the Portage Escarpment to the Erie Plain. The southern side of the feature has a much less dramatic transition, falling only 150 feet (46 m) to the surrounding highlands.

Gildersleeve Mountain is one of the more obvious geographic features of the Cleveland region. It is visible when the view is unobstructed by buildings or trees from downtown Cleveland, Mayfield Heights, and from the shore and waters of Lake Erie. It is obvious when looking to the south from the lake or northeast from any tall building near the lake shore in Cuyahoga County.

Gildersleeve Mountain also has views of Lake Erie from locations near the summit. From one location the view to the west and southwest affords a view of the downtown Cleveland skyline, 18 miles (29 km) away. On clear days the stacks in Lorain or Avon Lake may be visible, and on exceptional days the plume from cooling towers at the Davis-Besse or Fermi nuclear power stations may be visible far to the west.

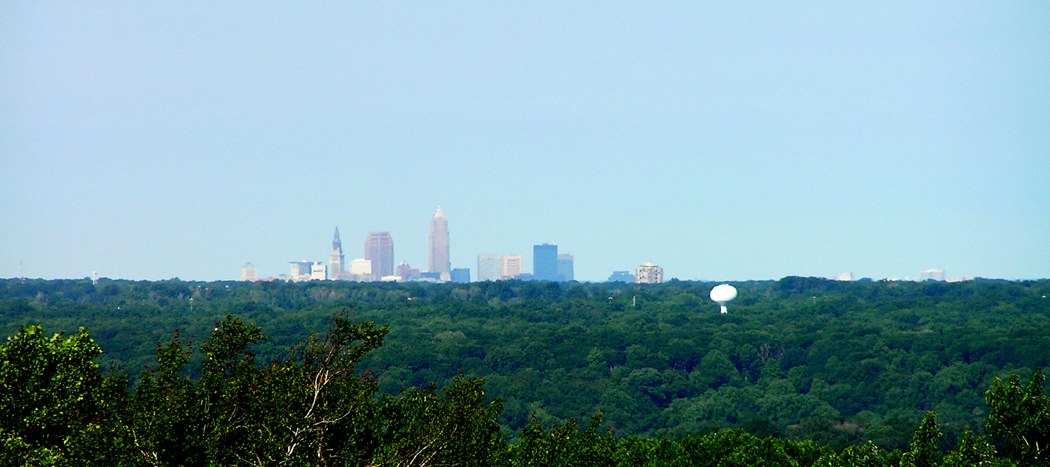
Downtown Cleveland skyline from Gildersleeve mountain

Point Rondeau, Ontario, 54 miles (87 km) away, is the closest point on the Canadian shore of Lake Erie. However, the distance to the horizon at the lookout is only 28.7 miles (46.2 km), so while the Canadian waters of Lake Erie are visible from Gildersleeve Mountain, the Canadian shore is not. On clear nights, lights are visible on the horizon to the northwest but it is uncertain if these are on the Canadian shore.

The views to the north and east were once very good with most of the landscape of Kirtland and the lakeshore of Lake County visible. Features from Perry to Willoughby were visible, but the view has not been maintained as trees that were once managed have been allowed to obstruct the view.

About 60% of Gildersleeve Mountain is within the 370-acre (1.5 km^{2}) Chapin Forest Reservation, which was acquired by the state of Ohio in 1949 and has been managed by the Lake County Metropolitan Park District since 1966, located along State Route 306/Chillicothe Road. It is managed as a recreational facility for the public and features picnic areas, sports facilities, and playgrounds, although none of these are located on the higher elevations. Trails that may be used for hiking, bicycling, horseback riding, and cross country skiing in winter cross the public lands and circle the summit.

Over 50 private residences are on the slopes of Gildersleeve Mountain. An active natural gas well was drilled in 2006, and the forested areas are logged for hardwood maple and oak. Commercial maple syrup production was once done using the native Sugar Maple stands for sap, but this activity is no longer viable. Gildersleeve Mountain was once an important source of sandstone for building and for sand and gravel. Commercial exploitation of these resources ceased in 1968.

== Topology ==
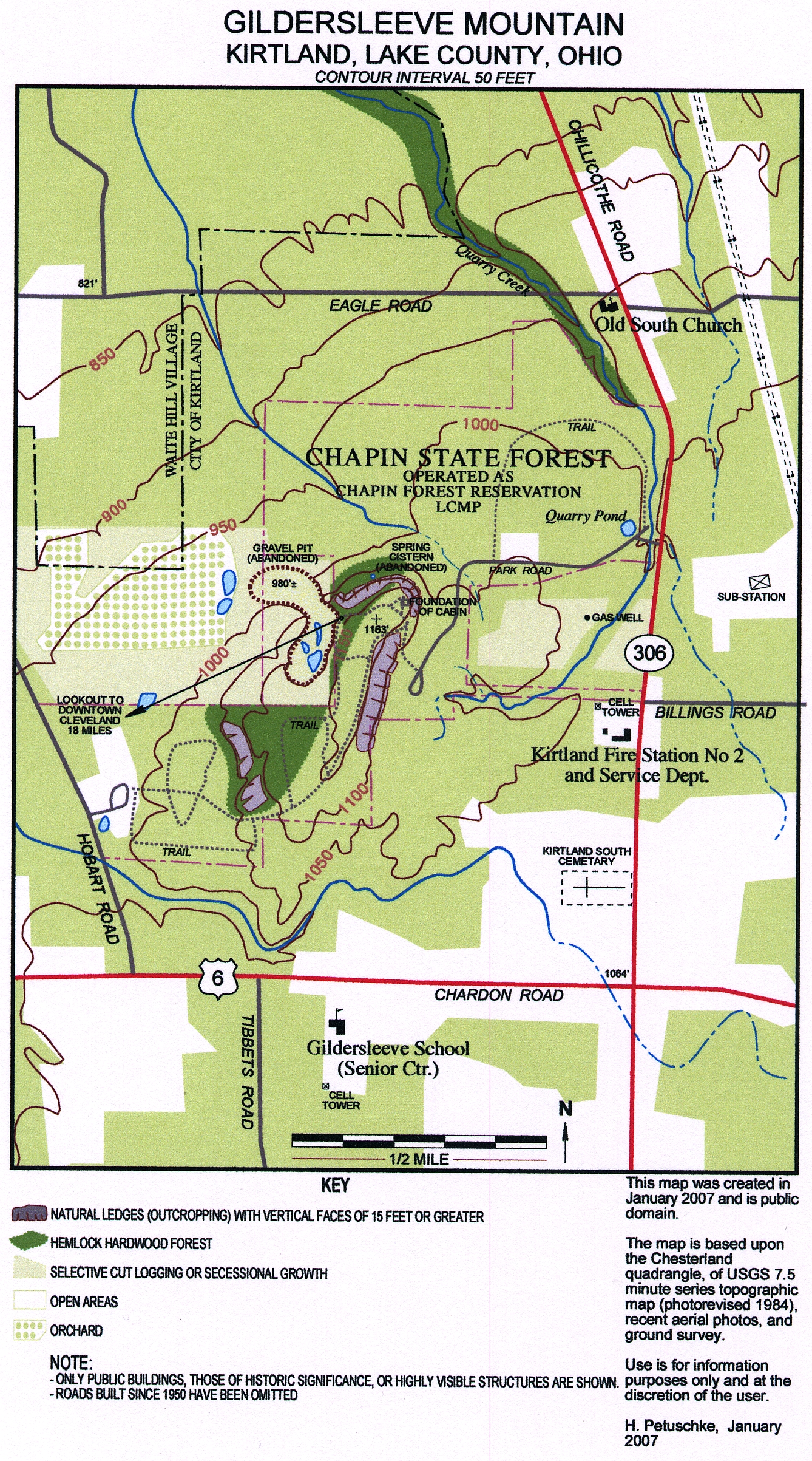
Topographical map of Gildersleeve Mountain

As the map to the right shows, the topography of Gildersleeve Mountain had been changed significantly by human activity. The sand and gravel quarry on the west side was active for more than 100 years before shutting down in 1968 and being acquired by the state of Ohio. The road and some trails have been used for the same period of time, but others were put in by the state of Ohio after it acquired the property in 1949, and still others have been added or re-routed by Lake Metroparks.

Clearcut and selective logging has also changed the land features. The most recent logging was a selective cut of about 40 acres (160,000 m^{2}) on the east side in the spring of 2006.

Development, although not shown on the map, also changed the topography. Some of the cleared areas and some of the forested areas are subdivided and have light duty roads with private homes. This is mostly on the southeast side of Gildersleeve Mountain. In 2007 the former quarry access area and orchard on the west side will be developed into home sites.

Another feature of interest is a cabin foundation on the northern end of the summit. There was a chimney associated with this foundation until it was blown down during the Ohio Fireworks Derecho that struck the Cleveland region on July 4, 1969. This storm also toppled several hundred trees on Gildersleeve Mountain. The foundation is now in an overgrown area of what used to be the Panorama Point picnic area. Although signage still calls out this area, the panoramic view from this location is no longer viable because trees have been allowed to grow and obscure the view.

Also of interest are the remnants of a cistern at the base of an outcropping to the west of the cabin foundation. These may be found by following the base of the rock outcroppings to the west of the Panorama Point area. The water caught by this cistern is filtered through the Sharon conglomerate and seeps out of the base of the outcropping.

There are numerous seeps all around Gildersleeve Mountain, and they are the source of the creeks that run off into the Chagrin River watershed. These creeks are augmented by rain and snow melt. They create ravine systems that cut through layers of rock and provide interesting places to study local geology. The Quarry Creek ravine accessible from the Old South Church property cuts down to the Cleveland Shale layer before crossing Eagle road.

== Natural history ==
=== Geology ===
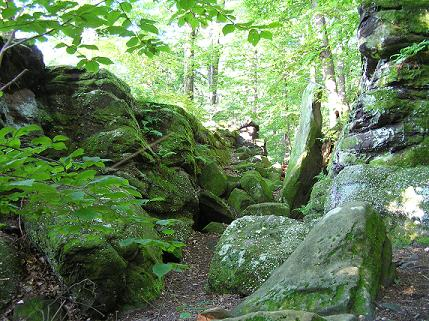
Glacial debris in the ledges. The upright rock in the center right is a 15-foot (4.6 m) piece of sandstone from the Sharon formation swept off the summit. It sits on till between two masses of Sharon conglomerate

Around 380 to 300 million years ago the area was on the Earth's equator as a part of the Pangaea super continent. With the uplifting of the continental plate, the area went from continental shelf to shallow sea. The geology of the area reflects this transition.

The lowest visible bedrock is Chagrin Shale. Named for the Chagrin River and easily found in the river valley, Chagrin shale is blue-gray in color, an offshore alluvial, silt shale of the Devonian period. This layer is found below about 800 feet (240 m) msl and is found when drilling wells on the slopes of Gildersleeve Mountain.

The next layer is Cleveland shale. This is a black shale that is an important source of local fossils. Again Cleveland shale is not visible on Gildersleeve Mountain but can easily be found in the nearby Chagrin River valley between 800 and 900 feet (270 m) msl.

Bedford shale is found above the Cleveland Shale layer. This material marks the uncertain transition between the Devonian and Pennsylvanian periods in the region. This layer is found in the ravines that run off the slopes of Gildersleeve Mountain. Bedford shale is a sand shale and is characterized by its roughly 90° cleavage pattern. Pieces of Bedford shale can look as if they were cut by human hands and are found up to about 950 feet (290 m) msl.

A thin strata of Sunbury shale is often found above the Bedford Shale. This is a thin layered, black shale, of more silty origins, possibly from a period when the waters running into the ocean basin were running slower, creating finer particles.

Berea sandstone is found from around 950 feet (290 m) msl to roughly 1,070 feet (330 m) msl. However, at this point it should be mentioned that the rock structure around Gildersleeve Mountain is by no means uniform. Millions of years of glaciation and resulting erosion and fill have resulted in many ravines that have been subsequently filled with glacial till and alluvial clays. Still, Berea sandstone is found in outcroppings and in other areas on Gildersleeve Mountain. In the nineteenth century it was quarried from the Stannard Quarry, what is now Quarry Pond, near Chillicothe Road. This material was used to build Kirtland Temple and other local structures. Berea sandstone is still used as a local building material.

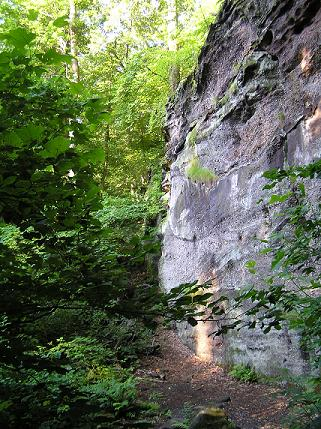
A rock face of exposed Sharon conglomerate

Sharon conglomerate is found beginning around 1,070 feet (330 m) msl. It is the predominant outcropping on Gildersleeve Mountain. Sharon Conglomerate is a sandstone imbedded with white quartz pebbles. It is hypothesized this rock was created by fast-running streams, running down ancient mountains. Faster-running water carried larger pebbles along with the sand, and this was deposited very near shore, or in river or stream deltas and estuaries. It is Sharon conglomerate outcroppings that up make most of the spectacular ledges that are found on the southeast, north, and western sides of Gildersleeve Mountain. The ledges have been split and eroded to create up to three distinct sets of formations separated by deeper crevasses. In some areas, there are vertical faces of over 30 feet (9.1 m) with very steep slopes at the base. In these areas the elevation change is dramatic, going from 1,060 feet (320 m) to 1,130 feet (340 m) in under 150 feet (46 m) of horizontal distance.

As mentioned earlier, glaciation has played an important part in the geology of Gildersleeve Mountain. During the Wisconsin glaciation, ice sheets more than a mile thick covered the region. Glaciers are the major erosive force in the region and ground down the higher elevations while scooping out the [Great Lakes]. The hard Sharon conglomerate is more resistant to this grinding action.

Glacial ice is not the only erosive force to act upon Gildersleeve Mountain. Glacial melt released huge amounts of water that flooded the landscape. This water cut ravines and filled others with clay and rocky debris.

The Gildersleeve Mountain we see today is the result of hundreds of millions of years of erosion. The sedimentary rocks were created by ancient erosion of the land, and the worn-down relic of a higher peak is also the result of erosion.

=== Flora ===
Prior to European settlement the area was a vast northern hardwood forest. On Gildersleeve mountain this probably consisted of 3 types of forest. Beech-maple forest, hemlock hardwood forest, and oak hickory forest. as remnant stands of all three types remain. Old growth oak and maple can be found in a few locations where they were not claimed by 19th-century logging. In second growth areas mixed mesophytic forest is predominant and generally these trees are about 100 to 150 years old.

The hemlock hardwood forest is one of the most unusual, but not uncommon on the Allegheny Plateau in the region. The chestnut oak is an interesting species found on the summit.

Herbaceous species are numerous. The most interesting are found in the crevasses and cooler areas in the ledge system. Wild flower species are typical of the area. the brilliant red cardinal flower, is found near creeks. Red and white trillium are found where deer have not browsed. Cress, foam flowers, blue cohosh, and occasionally orchids are found. A wide variety of ferns can be found. A rare species of grass may be found in the ledges. Unfortunately, deer browse has seriously reduced the abundance of herbaceous species. The outcroppings have additional interest because club mosses and lichens can be found on their surfaces.

Interesting fungi are present, but these disappear quickly given the fact that Gildersleeve Mountain is within a major American metropolitan area.

=== Fauna ===
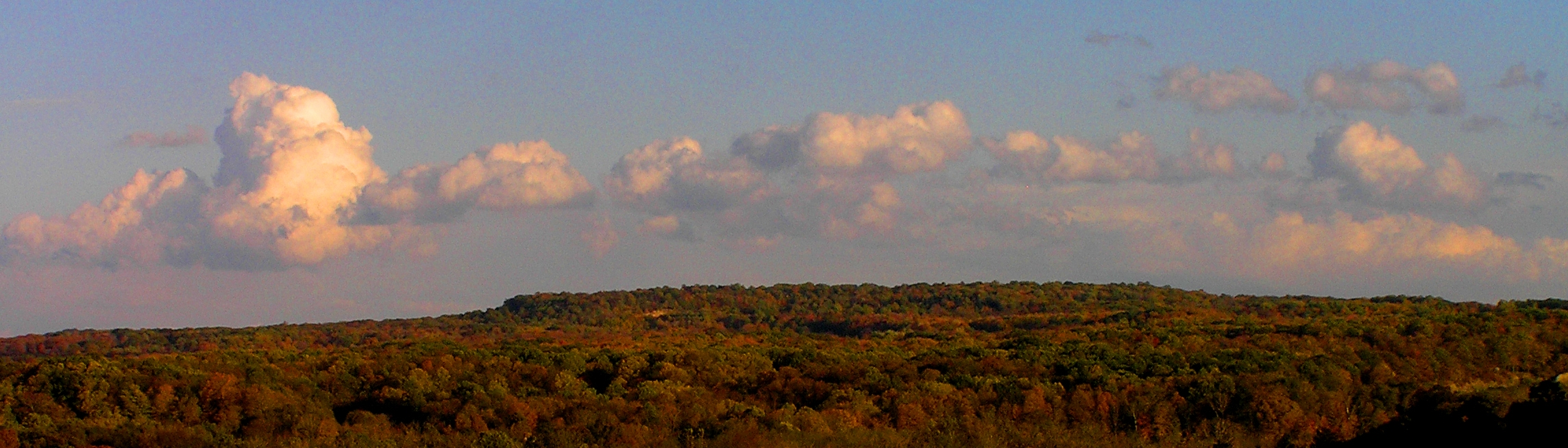
An autumn view of Gildersleeve Mountain from the northwest

The seeps and creeks running along the slopes provide a unique habitat. Dragonflies and damselflies (odonata) are of special interest to naturalists of the region and Gildersleeve mountain has been a site of recent discoveries. The first tiger spiketail, documented in Ohio, was discovered on Gildersleeve Mountain, in 2004. Other rare dragonflies documented on Gildersleeve Mountain include gray petaltail, comet darner, ocellated darner, and twin spotted spiketail.

Crayfish are found in the creeks. Fish species are not found in the shallow fast running creeks at these elevations but blue gills and largemouth bass can be found in the ponds.

Reptiles and amphibians are found here as well. Vernal pools hold salamanders and the Red Eft phase of the eastern newt. is found on the forest floor of the steeper slopes. Black rat snakes, and garter snakes are common. One of Kirtland's first settlers, Christopher Crary, recalled rattlesnakes in the 1820s or 30s in his memoir: "On Gildersleeve mountain twenty three were killed in one day, and they soon became extinct." These were probably eastern timber rattlesnake. American toads are found along with spring peepers and gray tree frogs. Pickerel frogs are found in the creeks. Green frogs are found in the vernal pools and other water. Bullfrogs are found in the ponds on the northwestern slope

Many species of birds can be found on Gildersleeve mountain. Barred owls are common year round residents and can be found by listening and watching carefully. They will often sit close to the trails in clear view but hidden in the shadows of the branches. Most visitors are oblivious to their presence. Cooper's hawks, red-shouldered hawks, broad-winged hawks and red-tailed hawks also nest on the slopes. Wild turkey nests here. The spectacular pileated woodpecker, as well as hairy, downy, and red-bellied woodpeckers are common year round. Great crested flycatcher, eastern phoebe, eastern wood pewee and Acadian flycatcher are common nesters. Eastern bluebird is common in the more open areas, wood thrush is found nesting wherever trees create a canopy overhead. Black-capped chickadees, tufted titmice, white-breasted nuthatch are common residents and red-breasted nuthatch is sometimes found. Red-eyed vireos are common tree top nesters. Hooded warbler and American redstart are common nesters in the forest under story. Ovenbird, nests on the forest floor and Louisiana waterthrush nest is the ravines and creek beds. Eastern towhee is found in the underbrush. Scarlet tanager, rose-breasted grosbeak, American goldfinch, house finch, and song sparrow are also common nesters.

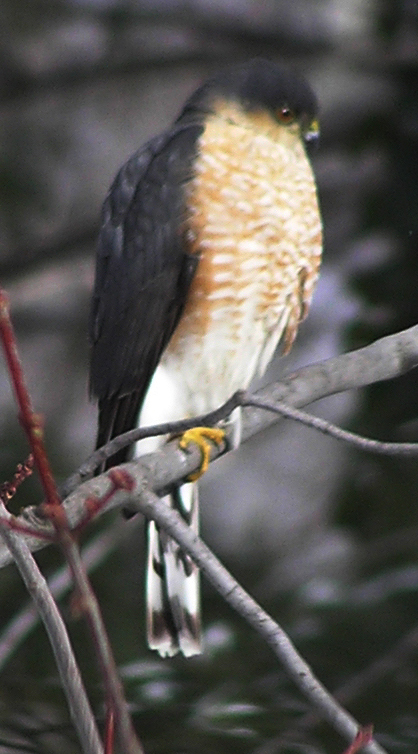
A sharp-shinned hawk on Gildersleeve mountain

Rarer nesting species are found here as well. Sharp-shinned hawks will sometimes nest in the deeper parts of the woods. Winter wren, was found nesting in 2009. Blue-headed vireo, is found in the ledges and hemlocks. Hermit thrush is a probable nesting species. Black-throated green warbler nests in the ledges and hemlock hardwood forest. Purple finch is an occasional nester. Dark-eyed junco, is a prolific nester and abundant year round on Gildersleeve mountain, not just in the winter, as in most of the Cleveland region. Pine siskin is another very rare nesting species first verified in 2009.

Interesting and very rare migrant species have been found on or seen from Gildersleeve mountain. Tundra swans are expected in fall as they fly over on their way south. Northern harrier, has been seen in the spring. Most spectacular have been western kingbird (fall 2005) and Kirtland's warbler (fall 2004). Uncommon winter visitors have included pine siskins, common redpoll, and evening grosbeak.

Mammals found on Gildersleeve mountain include the usual and the unexpected. Opossum, various shrews, moles, and several species of bats. Mice and voles are common with white footed deer mouse being the most abundant. Red, gray (both gray and black morphs) and eastern fox squirrel are common and southern flying squirrel is occasionally found. Eastern chipmunks are abundant. Raccoons are common. Three weasels, least, short tailed and long tailed have all been found. Striped skunk is less common than in more suburban residential areas. White tailed deer are common. Red fox have declined as coyote have increased in numbers. Evidence of bobcat has been found but confirmation of this species will require a specimen. In June 2004, a black bear made yet another contemporary appearance on Gildersleeve mountain. This time leaving tracks, tearing up a trash receptacles.

== History ==
Gildersleeve Mountain is named for the original land owner S.A. Gildersleeve.
