= Chagrin River =

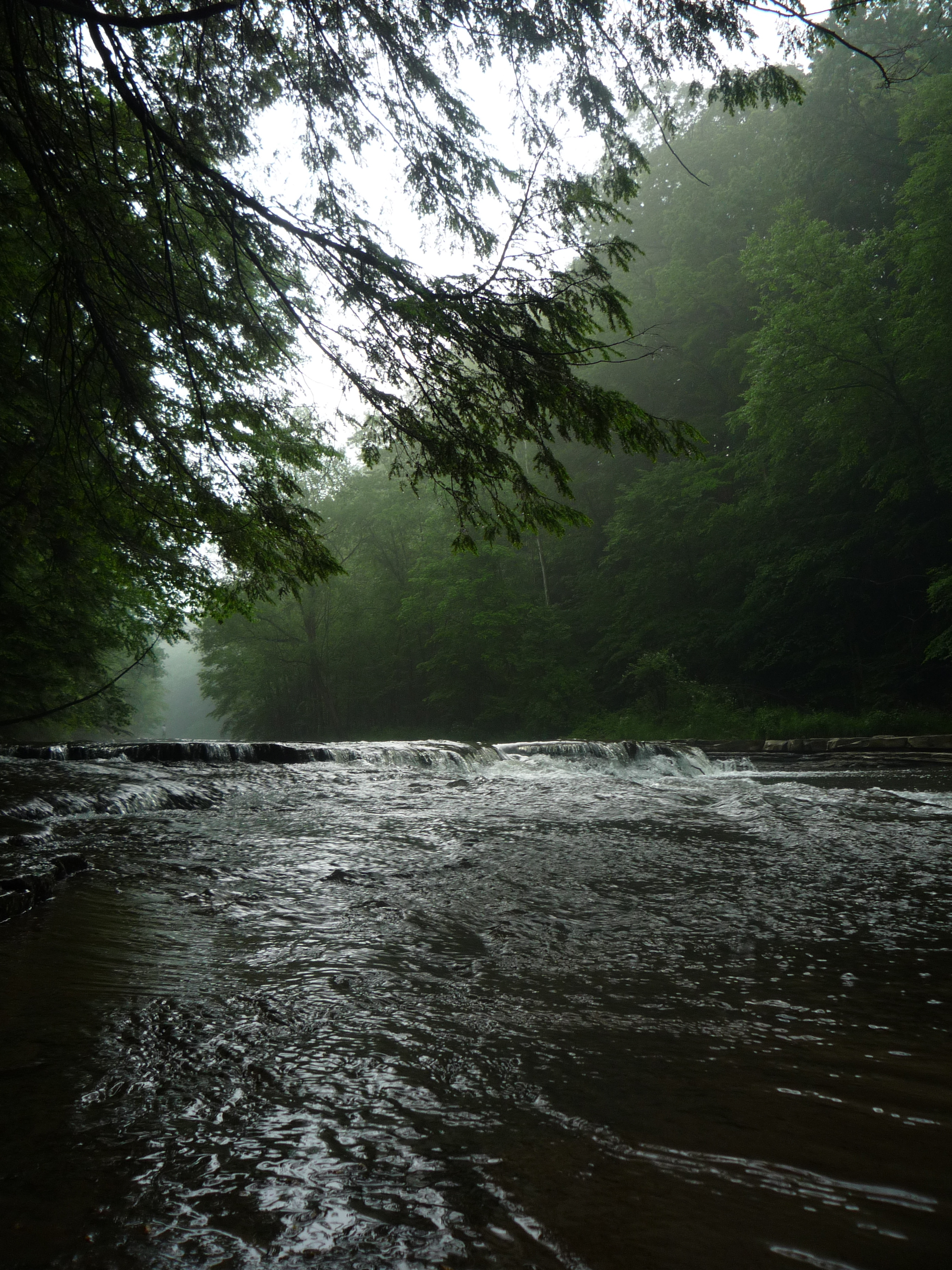
- Chagrin River from South Chagrin Reservation

- Map of the Chagrin River drainage basin

Location
- Country: United States
- State: Ohio

Physical characteristics
- Source: Bass Lake, Ohio
  - location: Munson Township, Northeast Ohio
- Mouth: Chagrin Harbor
  - location: Eastlake, Lake County, OH
  - coordinates: 41°40′36″N 81°26′13″W
- Discharge
  - location: Eastlake, OH

The Chagrin River is a 49-mile (79 km) long scenic watercourse located in Northeast Ohio and major tributary of Lake Erie. It comprises two principal tributary branches: the Aurora Branch and the East Branch. The tributary runs through suburban areas of Greater Cleveland in Cuyahoga, Geauga, and Portage counties, transects two Cleveland Metroparks reservations, and then meanders into nearby Lake County before emptying into the Great Lakes.

The East Branch's headwaters originate in Geauga County, flows north then west through Lake County, largely in Kirtland, and Kirtland Hills. In these communities the East Branch transects the Holden Arboretum, before intersecting the main in Willoughby.

The Aurora Branch's headwaters originate in northwest Portage County, flowing northwest through Aurora and portions of Geauga and Cuyahoga Counties, intersecting the main branch west of Chagrin Falls.

The Chagrin River was designated as a state scenic river in 1979.

== History ==
The Chagrin River, was originally referred to as the Elk River, as shown on a 1755 map created by cartographer Lewis Evans. Over time, the name evolved due to linguistic and cultural influences. It was later called Shaguin, a name believed to honor Sieur De Saguin, a French trader who engaged in commerce with Indigenous peoples in the region around the year 1742.

In 1797, surveyor Seth Pease, while mapping the Western Reserve, further altered the name. He anglicized "Shaguin" to Chagrin, the name that remains in use today. This transformation illustrates how geographic names often change through layers of translation, cultural interaction, and cartographic interpretation.

One of the river’s most prominent features, known as the High Falls, became a focal point for settlement in the early 19th century.

Beginning around 1833, settlers from New England were drawn to the area by the availability of waterpower. The falls supported the development of a variety of industries along the riverbanks in what is now Chagrin Falls Village.

By the mid-1800s, the community hosted several manufacturing operations, including: A gristmill constructed in 1836, an axe factory, metal foundry, multiple flour, woolen sawmills, paper mills and a woodenware factory.

These enterprises contributed to the village’s growth and economic development during the 19th century. While most of the original industrial facilities have since closed, one factory remains in operation today, preserving a link to the village’s early industrial heritage.

== Geography ==
Along its banks and tributaries, Berea sandstone, Bedford shale, Cleveland Shale, and Chagrin Shale bedrock are exposed in layers. The river itself was cut through the Allegheny Plateau as glaciers receded in the area at the end of the Wisconsin glaciation.

The lowest visible bedrock is Chagrin shale. Named for the river and easily found in the river valley. Chagrin shale is blue gray in color, an offshore alluvial, silt shale of the Devonian period. This layer is found below about 800 feet (240 m) msl.

The next layer is Cleveland shale. This is a black shale that is an important source of local fossils. Cleveland Shale is found in the Chagrin River valley between 800 and 900 feet (270 m) msl.

Bedford Shale is found above the Cleveland Shale layer. This material marks the uncertain transition between the Devonian and Pennsylvanian periods in the region and is also an important source of local fossils. This layer is found in the ravines that carry tributaries of the Chagrin River. Bedford shale is a sand shale and is characterized by its roughly 90° cleavage pattern. Pieces of Bedford shale can look as if they were cut by human hands and are found up to about 950 feet (290 m) msl.

Berea sandstone is found from around 950 feet (290 m) msl to roughly 1,070 feet (330 m) msl. Berea sandstone is an important local building material. In the nineteenth century it was quarried from the base of Gildersleeve Mountain (in the East Branch watershed). This material was used to build Kirtland Temple and other local structures. Berea sandstone is still used as a local building material

According to the Ohio Department of Natural Resources, more than 49 species of fish and 90 bird species live in the Chagrin River watershed, including the American brook lamprey, which is relatively rare in Ohio.

== Sports and recreation ==
Hiking is popular in many areas along the Chagrin River. Some areas are also popular for fishing: ESPN Outdoors recommends the Chagrin River for fishing, especially for finding steelhead. The Daniels Park Dam, a small lowhead dam, was their favorite spot. On December 31, 2004, the Daniels Park Dam failed due to excess pressure from ice and water.

The Aurora branch of the Chagrin River is a class III-IV of whitewater, according to the American Whitewater Association. On the other hand, the Daniels Park section is rated a class I.

== Channelization ==
In 2007, the Ohio Environmental Protection Agency were notified that, in violation of both state law and Federal Regulations, 8,700 feet (2,700 m) of the East Branch of the river was channelized and diked to prevent flooding on agricultural land owned by the Village of Kirtland Hills. This activity was conducted by local developer Jerome T. Osborne Sr., who leased the land from the village. Both the village and Osborne were cited for the activity, which threatened the riparian floodplains and increased the likelihood and severity of downstream flooding in the communities of Willoughby and Eastlake. In 2012, the Ohio Attorney General's Office under Mike DeWine sued Osborne's company for failing to obtain the proper permits. In 2016, Lake County Commons Pleas Judge Richard L. Collins Jr. ordered the now-late Osborne estate to pay a civil penalty of $404,240 plus interest to the Ohio State treasury. The Ohio Department of Natural Resources later dedicated $2.2 million to the restoration of the East Branch, which is ongoing as of 2024.

== Gallery ==
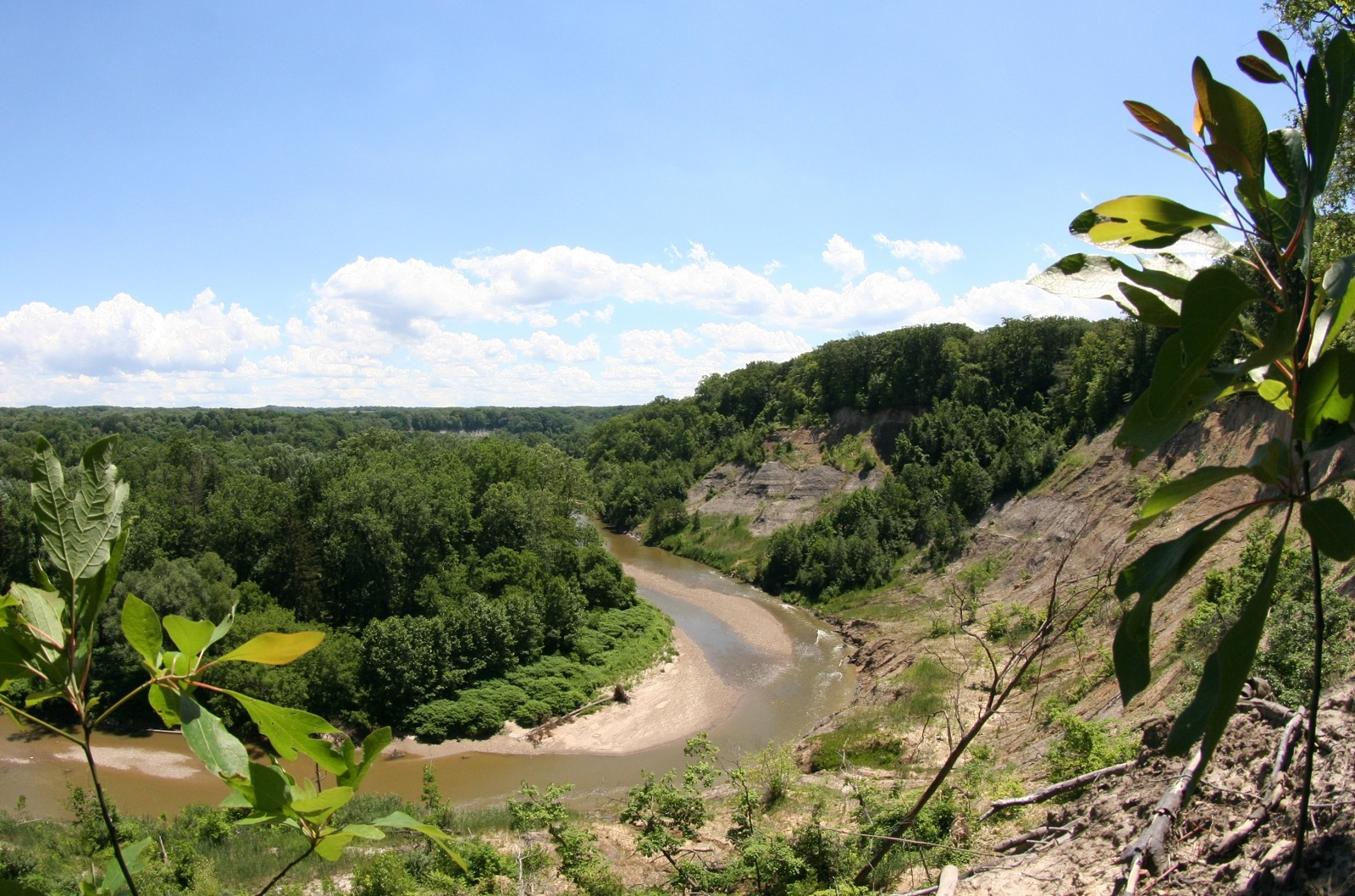
Viewed from Hach-Otis Sanctuary (Willoughby Hills, Ohio)

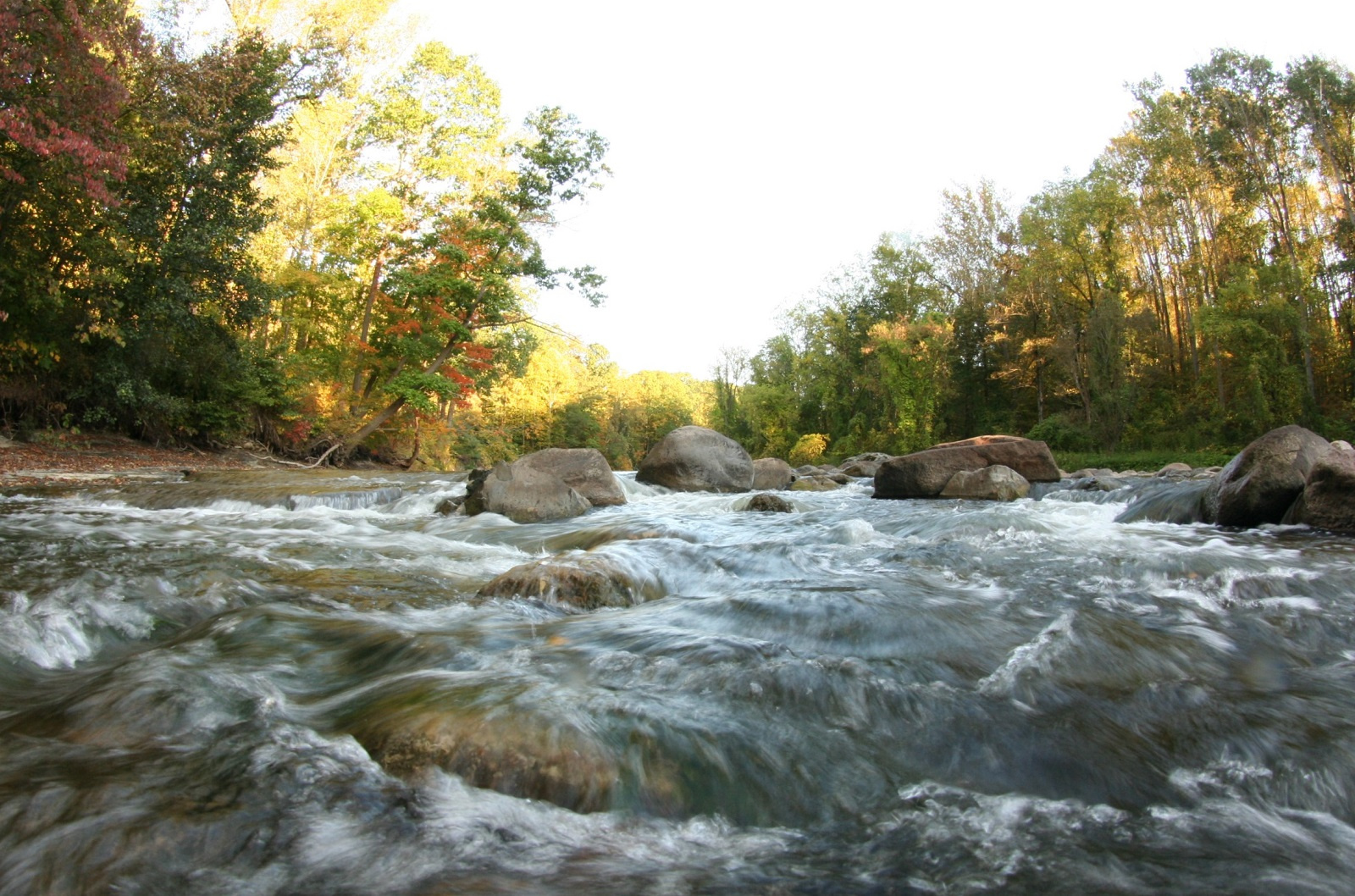
Viewed from Cleveland Metropolitan Park (Willoughby Hills, Ohio)

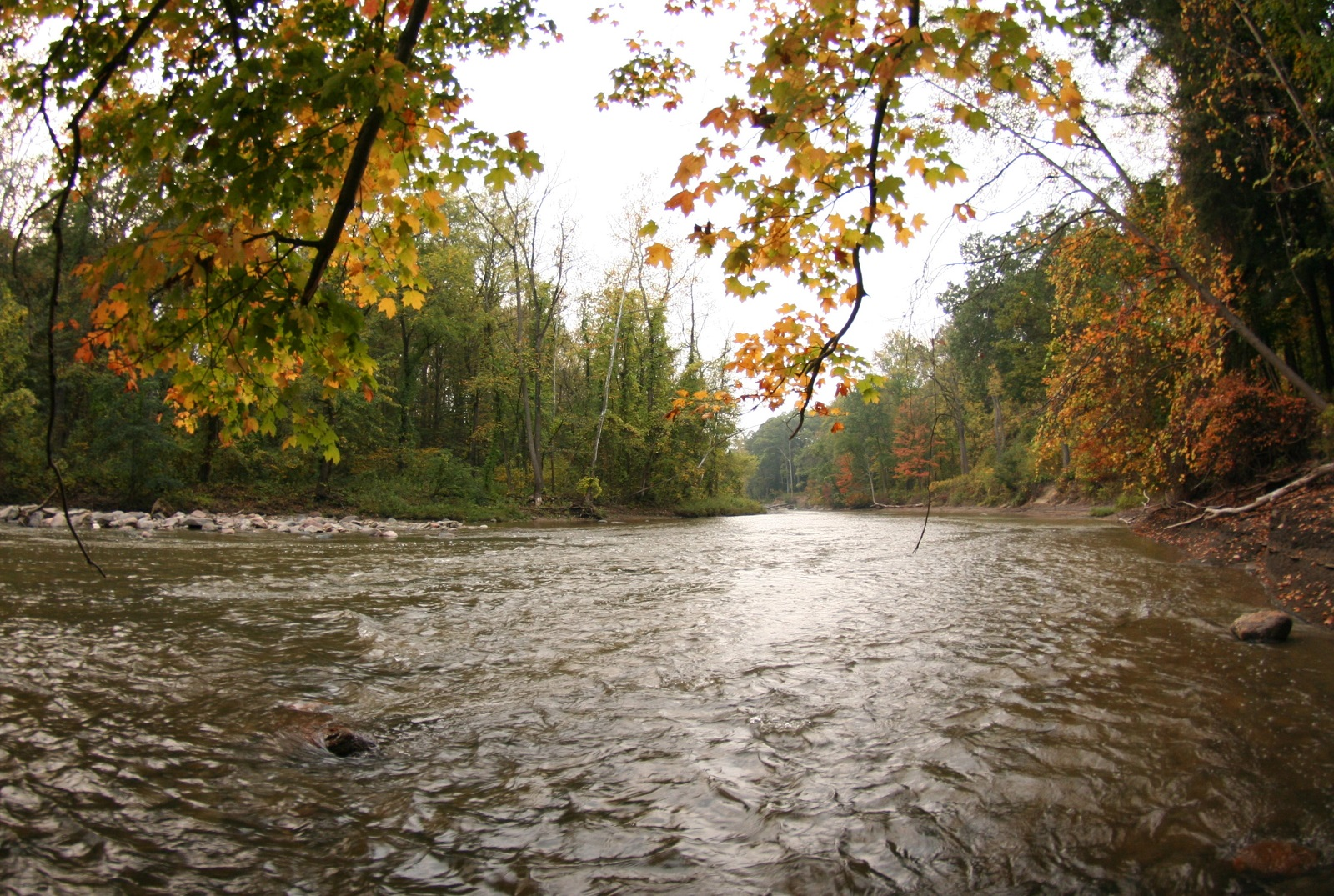
Viewed in fall, from Cleveland Metropolitan Park (Willoughby Hills, Ohio)

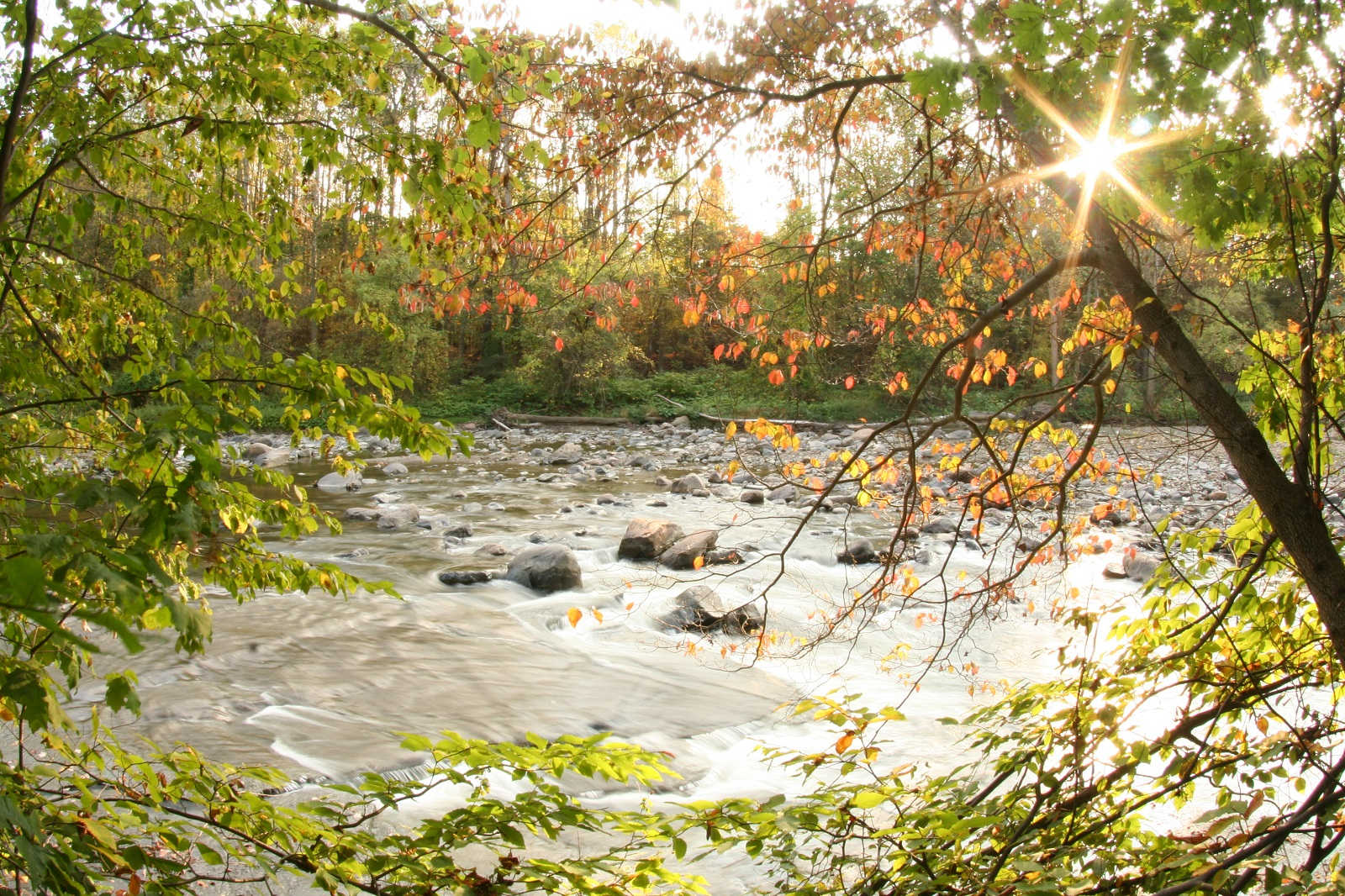
Viewed in fall, from Willoughby Hills, Ohio

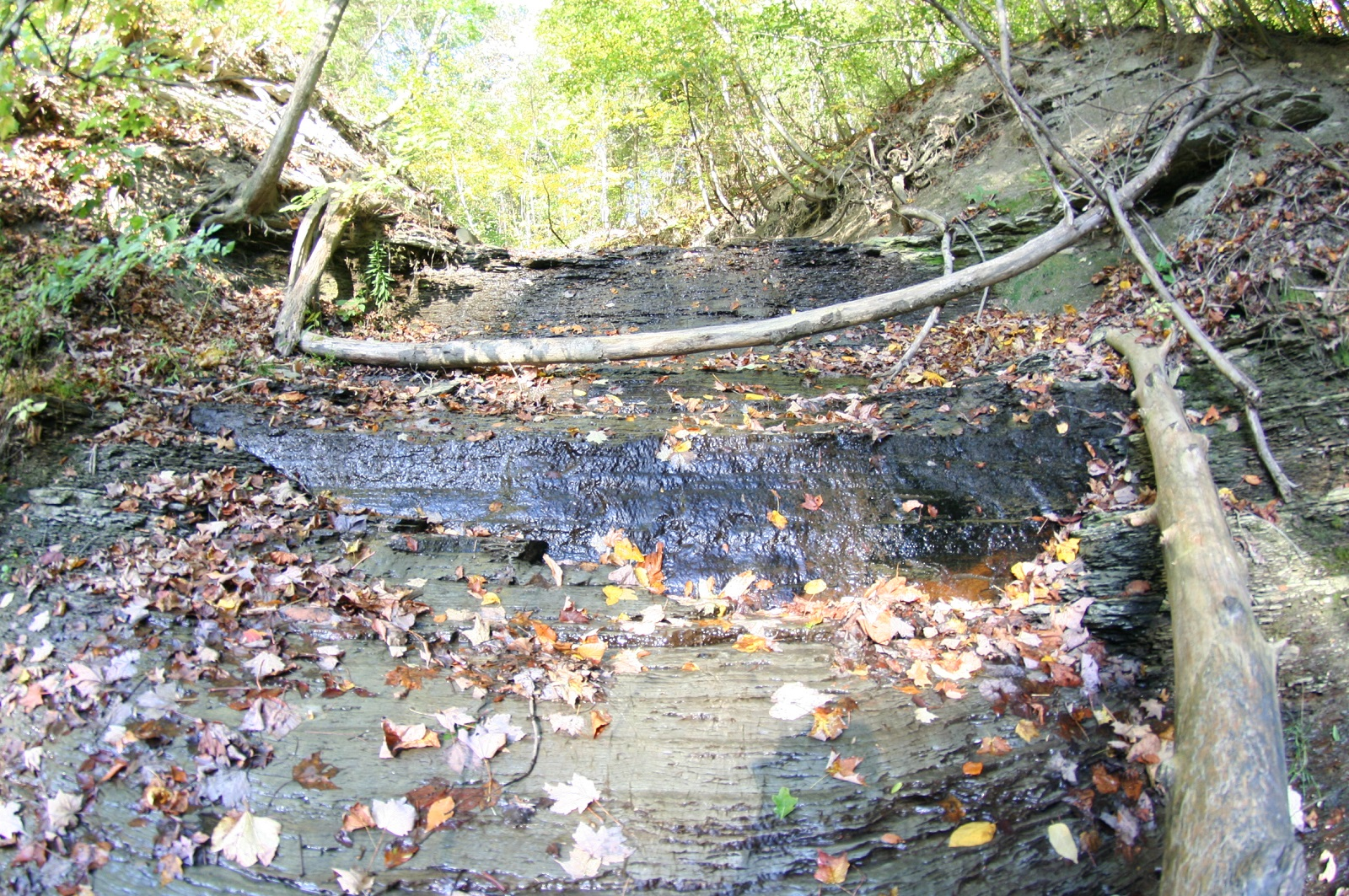
A minor tributary flowing into the Chagrin River, viewed from Cleveland Metropolitan Park

== See also ==
- List of rivers of Ohio
