= Kirtland, Ohio =

- City
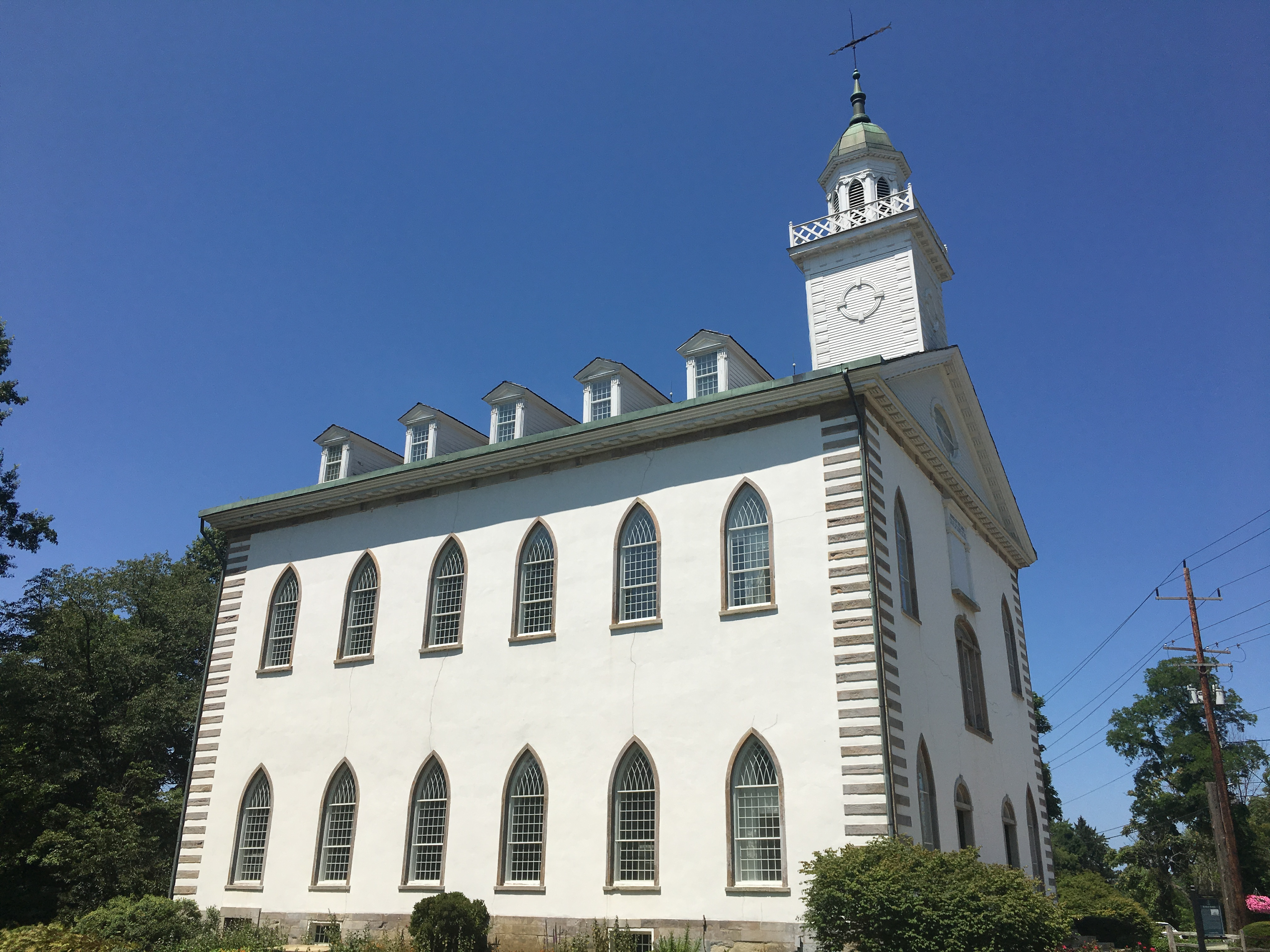
- Kirtland Temple
- Motto(s): "City of Faith & Beauty"
- Location of Kirtland in Greater Cleveland

- Location within Ohio Location within the United States
- Coordinates: 41°36′09″N 81°21′41″W
- Country: United States
- State: Ohio
- County: Lake

Government
  - Mayor: Kevin Potter (D)

Area
  - Total: 16.80 sq mi (43.52 km^{2})
  - Land: 16.67 sq mi (43.18 km^{2})
  - Water: 0.13 sq mi (0.34 km^{2})
- Elevation: 1,037 ft (316 m)

Population (2020)
  - Total: 6,937
  - Density: 416.1/sq mi (160.66/km^{2})
- Time zone: UTC-5 (Eastern (EST))
  - Summer (DST): UTC-4 (EDT)
- ZIP code: 44094
- Area code: 440
- FIPS code: 39-40642
- GNIS feature ID: 1086419
- Website: kirtlandohio.com

Kirtland is a city in Lake County, Ohio, United States. The population was 6,937 at the 2020 census. Kirtland is known for being the early headquarters of the Latter Day Saint movement from 1831 to 1837 and the site of the movement's first temple, the Kirtland Temple, completed in 1836. The Kirtland Temple and nearby Historic Kirtland Village are maintained as historic sites highlighting that era. The city is also the location for multiple parks in the Lake Metroparks system, as well as the Holden Arboretum.

== History ==
After the founding of the United States, northern Ohio was designated as the Western Reserve and was sold to the Connecticut Land Company. The area was first surveyed by Moses Cleaveland and his party in 1796.

Kirtland is named for Turhand Kirtland, a principal of the Connecticut Land Company and judge in Trumbull County, the first political entity in Ohio that included Kirtland township. Kirtland, a veteran of the American Revolutionary War, demonstrated "both breadth of vision and integrity" in his fair dealings with the local Native Americans. He was known for his bravery, resourcefulness, and passion for justice. Dr. Jared Potter Kirtland was the son of the former; he helped to found a medical college in nearby Willoughby, Ohio, and he compiled the first ornithology of Ohio. The bird Kirtland's warbler is named for Jared Kirtland. This rare species has been documented in the city during migration, but it does not nest in Ohio.

The densely forested, clay soiled, high, hilly, land of Kirtland was settled later than surrounding townships: Mentor in 1798, and Chester in 1802. Kirtland's first European settlers were the John Moore family, soon followed by the Crary family who came to Kirtland in 1811. In 1893 Christopher Crary wrote a memoir of his Kirtland life, which provided a great deal of material for Anne B. Prusha's 1982 history of Kirtland.

=== Headquarters of the Latter Day Saint movement ===
From 1831 to 1832 and again from 1833 to 1838, Kirtland was the headquarters for the Latter Day Saint movement. Joseph Smith moved the church to Kirtland in 1831, shortly after its formal organization in April 1830 in Fayette, New York. In Kirtland, Latter Day Saints built their first temple, the Kirtland Temple. The temple was built with a degree of opulence, considering the underdeveloped nature of the area and the poverty of most early church members. Many attending the Kirtland Temple dedication in 1836 claimed to see multiple heavenly visions and appearances of heavenly beings, including deity. For this and other reasons, Kirtland remains a place of importance to those of all Latter Day Saint denominations. Many sections from the Doctrine and Covenants, considered modern revelations and canonical by most denominations within the Latter Day Saint movement, originated in Kirtland during the 1830s.

Ownership of the Kirtland Temple came into question after the main body of Latter Day Saints moved west. The Reorganized Church of Jesus Christ of Latter Day Saints (now Community of Christ) sought to have the matter settled in civil court; but ultimately obtained ownership of the property through adverse possession. Besides giving tours, Community of Christ allowed others to use the temple for special meetings. On March 5, 2024 The Church of Jesus Christ of Latter-day Saints (LDS Church) and Community of Christ announced that ownership of the site had transferred to the former as part of a $192.5 million acquisition of historic sites and objects.

=== 1838 to present ===
After the majority of the Latter Day Saints departed Kirtland in 1837–38, and during the latter part of the 19th century, Kirtland's population diminished and life was typical of that of the region. Crary recalls the last rattlesnakes being killed on Gildersleeve Mountain in the 1830s. During this period most of the wooded areas near Kirtland were cleared for agriculture, with corn and apples being the predominant crops.

In the early 20th century, Kirtland School (now Kirtland Elementary) was built to consolidate three school houses. One of the old school houses can still be found at the corner of Baldwin and Booth Roads in Kirtland Hills. Kirtland saw few changes until after World War II when several residential subdivisions were built. In 1957 a high school was built and in 1961, Gildersleeve Elementary was built along Chardon Road (US 6). In 1968 a middle school was completed for grades 6–8.

The 1960s saw an influx and expansion of local businesses. A shopping center was built, which combined the hardware, drug store, grocery, barber shop, plus the local doctor and dentist in one building. By 1965, Interstate 90 was open, allowing a quicker trip into Cleveland. In 1968 the citizens of Kirtland voted in a special election to incorporate the township. James Naughton was the first mayor of the village, which became a city when the 1970 census showed population exceeded 5,000. Naughton was succeeded as mayor by Doug Guy, Wesley Phillips, Mario Marcopoli, Edward Podajol, and Mark Tyler. Kirtland continued to grow in population slowly through the 1970s and 1980s.

In April 1989, Jeffrey Lundgren, a religious extremist, coerced some in his cult into murdering a family of five and hiding their bodies in a pit dug inside a barn, on Chardon Road (U.S. 6). Those of Lundgren's cult who participated in the murders were sentenced to life in prison; Lundgren was executed on October 24, 2006. The site of the murders was converted from a privately owned home into a church beginning in 2007. New Promise Church opened in April 2009.

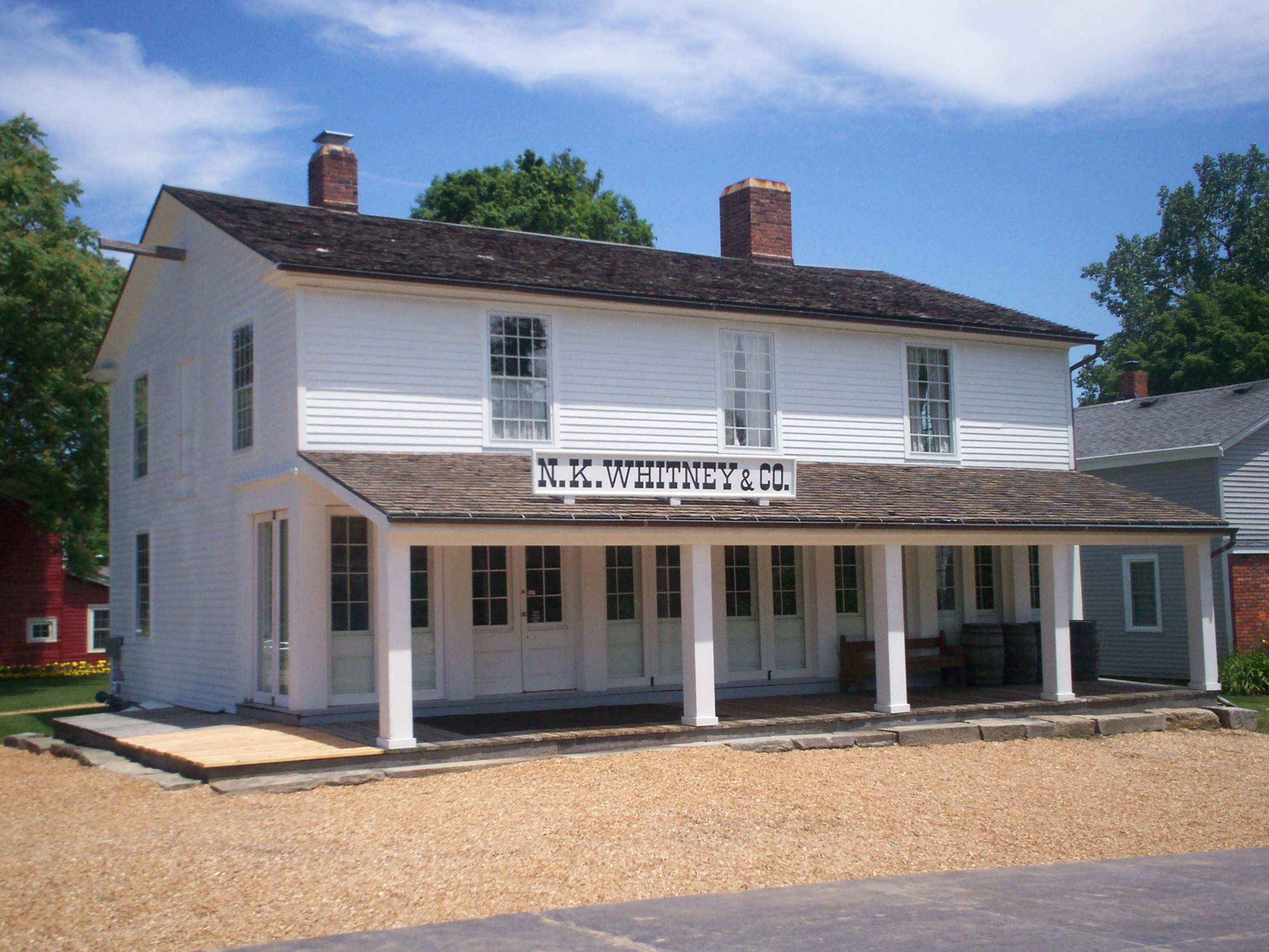
The N. K. Whitney Store

The LDS Church purchased the N.K. Whitney Store in 1979 and restored it in 1984, operating it as a historic site open to tours. The Whitney home, across the street, was acquired soon after and was used for many years as a visitor center. By the late 1990s, Kirtland was becoming an increasingly popular tourist destination, so the creation of Historic Kirtland Village was announced in April 2000, located in the Kirtland flats along the East Branch of the Chagrin River, to provide insight into what life was like during the 1830s when Kirtland was the home of Joseph Smith, Brigham Young, and other founders of Mormonism. As part of the project, to create a pedestrian-friendly area, Kirtland-Chardon Road was rerouted along the eastern side of the site, while Ohio State Route 615 was rerouted around the northern side, eliminating what had been a busy intersection right in front of the Whitney home and store. The Whitney home was restored to its 1830s appearance, while historically accurate replicas of the original John Johnson Inn, schoolhouse, sawmill, and ashery were researched and constructed on or near their original sites, along with a new visitor center. The project was completed and dedicated in 2003. In 2023, the church completed and dedicated the restored Joseph and Emma Smith home on Chillicothe Road, just north of the Kirtland Temple. From 2004 through 2016, a group of volunteers produced an annual musical theater production celebrating the city's Latter Day Saint history called "This Is Kirtland!", which was held at the nearby LDS meetinghouse.

In 2003, Schupp's farm and orchard, on Hobart Road, became inactive leaving Rock's farm on Chillicothe Road, the only active for-profit farm in the city. As of 2006, there are still active cattle and horse farming in the city and some commercial nursery activity. Sugaring still occurs, with at least two active sugar bushes other than the large scale Bicknell Sugar Bush at the Holden Arboretum.

Kirtland has been visited by two sitting Presidents of the United States, including George W. Bush.

== Geography ==
According to the United States Census Bureau, the city has a total area of 16.80 square miles (43.51 km^{2}), of which, 16.67 square miles (43.18 km^{2}) is land and 0.13 square miles (0.34 km^{2}) is water.

Kirtland is located south of the lake shore plain of Lake Erie and is situated on the higher elevations of the Allegheny Plateau. The principal geographic features are the East Branch of the Chagrin River, Pierson's Knob, and Gildersleeve Mountain, 1,163 feet (354 m) Daniel's Mountain,1,246 feet (380 m) is the high point.

Native vegetation is northern hardwood forest. Hemlock-hardwood forest is found in the higher elevations and along ravines, beech-maple forest is predominant in other areas. A few stands of old growth oak-hickory forest can also be found in the city.

Kirtland is located in the snowbelt region of Lake Erie, and has snowfall and weather patterns similar to nearby Chardon. In this area, annual snowfall averages over 100 inches (250 cm) per year, and anecdotal evidence indicates seasonal snowfall can exceed 250 inches (640 cm) in some microclimate areas.

Kirtland is primarily a residential community. Over 20 percent of the land area is forest preserve or park land. The Holden Arboretum at 3,500 acres (14 km^{2}) is the largest of these, but not all of Holden's land is located in Kirtland. Three metropolitan parks are also in Kirtland. The largest is Chapin State Forest, at 390 acres (1.6 km^{2}), which includes much of Gildersleeve mountain. Also in Kirtland are Penitentiary Glen, and the Lake Farm Park. Lakeland Community College is located largely in the City of Kirtland, the campus dominating the northern part of the city.

== Demographics ==
Historical population
Census	Pop.	Note	%±
1880	206		—
1970	5,530		—
1980	5,969		7.9%
1990	5,881		−1.5%
2000	6,670		13.4%
2010	6,866		2.9%
2020	6,937		1.0%
U.S. Decennial Census

In 2018 languages spoken in the city were: 92.5% English, 2.2% Croatian, 1.5% Italian, and 1.5% Slovene.

=== 2020 census ===
As of the 2020 census, Kirtland had a population of 6,937. The median age was 48.4 years. 20.8% of residents were under the age of 18 and 23.1% of residents were 65 years of age or older. For every 100 females there were 98.1 males, and for every 100 females age 18 and over there were 97.7 males age 18 and over.

55.5% of residents lived in urban areas, while 44.5% lived in rural areas.

There were 2,626 households in Kirtland, of which 29.7% had children under the age of 18 living in them. Of all households, 62.8% were married-couple households, 14.8% were households with a male householder and no spouse or partner present, and 17.9% were households with a female householder and no spouse or partner present. About 22.0% of all households were made up of individuals and 11.7% had someone living alone who was 65 years of age or older.

There were 2,781 housing units, of which 5.6% were vacant. The homeowner vacancy rate was 0.7% and the rental vacancy rate was 8.1%.

Racial composition as of the 2020 census
Race	Number	Percent
White	6,509	93.8%
Black or African American	35	0.5%
American Indian and Alaska Native	7	0.1%
Asian	73	1.1%
Native Hawaiian and Other Pacific Islander	1	0.0%
Some other race	32	0.5%
Two or more races	280	4.0%
Hispanic or Latino (of any race)	114	1.6%

=== 2010 census ===
As of the 2010 Census, there were 6,866 people, 2,544 households, and 1,948 families residing in the city. The population density was 411.9 inhabitants per square mile (159.0/km^{2}). There were 2,716 housing units at an average density of 162.9 per square mile (62.9/km^{2}). The racial makeup of the city was 97.7% White, 0.4% African American, 0.1% Native American, 0.7% Asian, 0.2% from other races, and 0.9% from two or more races. Hispanic or Latino of any race were 1.1% of the population.

There were 2,544 households, of which 31.2% had children under the age of 18 living with them, 66.3% were married couples living together, 7.0% had a female householder with no husband present, 3.3% had a male householder with no wife present, and 23.4% were non-families. 20.2% of all households were made up of individuals, and 8.1% had someone living alone who was 65 years of age or older. The average household size was 2.63 and the average family size was 3.05.

The median age in the city was 46.9 years. 23% of residents were under the age of 18; 5.8% were between the ages of 18 and 24; 17.8% were from 25 to 44; 34.3% were from 45 to 64; and 19.1% were 65 years of age or older. The gender makeup of the city was 49.3% male and 50.7% female.

Of the city's population over the age of 25, 39.4% hold a bachelor's degree or higher.

== Government ==
Kirtland has a mayor-council system of government. As of 2024, the mayor is Kevin Potter, a Democrat. The City Council consists of seven members, who are elected for four-year terms. Three members are elected by the city at-large, and four members are elected from wards.

== Notable people ==
- Alma M. Aldrich, member of the Wisconsin State Assembly, born in Kirtland in 1837
- Elizabeth Watson Russell Lord, educator and philanthropist, born and raised in Kirtland from 1819 to 1847
- Jeffrey Lundgren, religious extremist and convicted mass-murderer, lived in Kirtland from 1987 to 1989
- Hattie Martindale, an involuntary celebrity, born in Kirtland in 1838
- Emma Smith, wife of Latter Day Saint movement founder Joseph Smith, lived in Kirtland from 1831 to 1832 and 1833 to 1838
- Joseph Smith, founder and leader of the Latter Day Saint movement, lived in Kirtland from 1831 to 1832 and from 1833 to 1838
- Newel K. Whitney, early leader of the Latter Day Saint movement lived in Kirtland from 1819 to 1838
- Brigham Young, second president of The Church of Jesus Christ of Latter-day Saints, lived in Kirtland from 1833 to 1837

== See also ==
- Kirtland Safety Society
