= Little Mountain (Ohio) =

Hill in Ohio, United States

Coordinates: 41°38′06″N 81°16′25″W

Little Mountain is a hill in the northeastern region of the U.S. state of Ohio, located on the border between Chardon Township in Geauga County and Concord Township in Lake County, with an elevation of 1,220 feet (370 m). (Note: While the U.S. Geographic Names Information System database lists the elevation as 1,220 feet (370 m), United States Geological Survey topographic maps identify the elevations of the hill's two peaks as 1,266 feet (386 m) and 1,247 feet (380 m).) Along with nearby Gildersleeve Mountain, Brown Mountain, and Thompson Ledges, it is located along the northern ridge of an extension of the Allegheny Plateau.

The first permanent settler arrived at Little Mountain in 1815. In the late 19th Century, a resort was located near the summit; it has been the location of various hotels, the first built in 1831, the last demolished in 1925. Among the resort's frequent visitors were James A. Garfield and John D. Rockefeller. A nearby settlement called Joice's Corners existed briefly during the time of the resort.

Nearby Holden Arboretum provides tours of Little Mountain, whose access is otherwise restricted, and owns much of the land encompassing it.
