= Cleveland Metroparks =

Public park system in Ohio, US

Cleveland Metroparks System

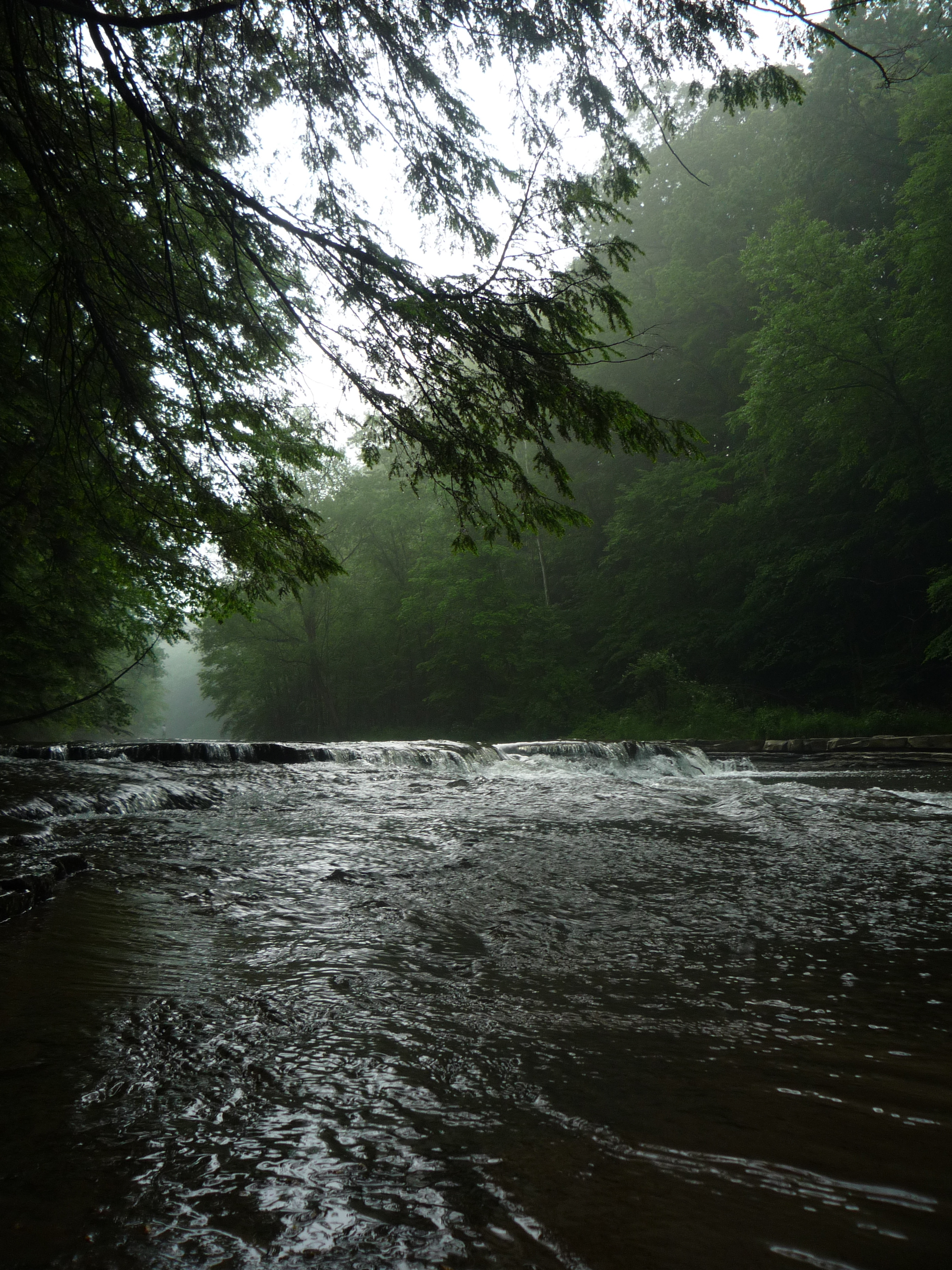
- The Chagrin River as viewed from The South Chagrin Reservation
- Type: Public park district
- Location: Greater Cleveland, Ohio, United States
- Area: 25,000 acres (10,000 ha)
- Created: 1917
- Operator: Cleveland Metroparks Board of Park Commissioners
- Visitors: 18.5 million
- Open: All year

Cleveland Metroparks is an extensive system of nature preserves in Greater Cleveland, Ohio. Eighteen reservations, which largely encircle the city of Cleveland, follow along the shore of Lake Erie and the rivers and creeks that flow through the region. Referred to unofficially as the 'Emerald Necklace', the network of parks spans over 25,000 acres (10,000 ha) and includes over 300 miles (480 km) of walking, bicycle, and horse trails as well as numerous picnic areas, nature education centers, golf courses, and countless fishing spots. In addition, the district includes the zoo in Cleveland. Four of the reservations are adjacent to Cuyahoga Valley National Park.

Although the majority of the reservations are in suburban Cuyahoga County, Brookside Reservation is located within the city of Cleveland, and the Lakefront Reservation consists of several beachfront parks spanning the city's waterfront. Additionally, three of the reservations are either partially or entirely situated outside Cuyahoga County: a portion of North Chagrin Reservation is in Lake County; a small portion of Bradley Woods Reservation is in Lorain County; the Hinckley Reservation is in Hinckley Township in Medina County.

The North Chagrin Reservation houses one of the only old growth forests in Northeast Ohio, the A.B. Williams Memorial Woods.

The importance of conserving our natural resources is now well recognized. Cannot it be truly said that these natural wild beautiful valleys and glens which lie adjacent to our rapidly growing urban centers are a kind of 'natural resource' of ever increasing value to the public?

— William A. Stinchcomb, (speaking to the Cleveland City Council in 1909)

== History ==
The genesis of the Cleveland Metropolitan Park System began with a vision by William Albert Stinchcomb in the early 20th century. A self-taught engineer working as a surveyor for the City of Cleveland in 1895, Stinchcomb was appointed chief engineer of the City Parks Department by Mayor Tom Johnson in 1902, and shortly thereafter began to conceptualize an Emerald Necklace for the city. Stinchcomb lobbied the Ohio legislature to amend the state constitution so as to permit the authorization of natural resource conservation at the county level in 1913. However, the Ohio Supreme Court overturned Cuyahoga County's new park law as unconstitutional. Unflappable in his pursuit, Stinchcomb then went back to Columbus lobbying for new legislation allowing for the establishment of what was to become the Metropolitan Park District, which is today the oldest metropolitan park district in Ohio.

In 1915, Stinchcomb received the break that would finally allow him to pursue his ambitious goal. While serving as Cuyahoga County engineer, he was approached by city council and offered an appointment as consulting engineer on what was eventually to become the Cleveland Metropolitan Park District board—the same board he'd lobbied for two years prior. Stinchcomb accepted and, at the urging of city council, immediately hired the renowned landscape architectural firm, the Olmsted Brothers. The group immediately went to work drawing up plans for a system of connecting parks as well as the acquisition of land and resources. The proposed Cuyahoga County Park and Boulevard System, which included a parkway encircling the Cleveland area, following various creeks and rivers in the area, was the framework for what would become today's Metroparks system.

Stinchcomb returned to the Statehouse in 1917, this time as an officer of the newly formed Metropolitan Park District board, and proposed a bill that would authorize the Metropolitan Park District board to levy a one-tenth mill tax to fund the district's operations. This was followed shortly after by the authorization of a second one-tenth mill tax to fund property acquisition By 1921, the fledgling Park District had acquired the land that would become the Rocky River and Big Creek Reservations, most of which was donated. Between 1920 and 1930, the system grew through the investment of capital from its tax levies. Purchased for approximately $4 million, land for the Hinckley, Brecksville, Bedford, South Chagrin, North Chagrin and Euclid Creek Reservations increased the district's holdings from just over 100 acres to more than 9,000 within the span of a decade.

== The Metroparks today ==
With free admission and almost unlimited access during daylight hours, the Metroparks' 25,000+ acres are a widely popular destination for runners, hikers, cyclists, boaters, fishermen, and nature enthusiasts. A major source of outdoor recreation in the region, official attendance figures recorded 18.5 million recreational visitors to the system's 18 reservations and the zoo in 2018, making the attraction one of the most visited in the state of Ohio. The Metroparks golf courses, amenities that do exact a fee, attract over 400,000 golfers annually. With varying resources, terrains and geographical features, each park is unique. Some features, such as the toboggan chutes (also ask a fee) at Mill Stream Run Reservation's Chalet, are found nowhere else in the entire State of Ohio.

== Safety ==
The Cleveland Metroparks are patrolled by the Cleveland Metroparks Police Department which was founded in 1917. The departments primary goal is to provide a safe environment for the millions of visitors to the park system. Previously known as "Rangers" (c. 1959–2019), the department returned to its original 1921 title, "Police", in 2019 to better communicate the police function and law enforcement role within the communities served. Members of the department have always been fully certified police officers despite the title changes. Cleveland Metroparks Police patrol the reservations and lands adjacent to, 24 hours a day, 7 days a week, enforcing both traffic, criminal, and wildlife law utilizing several specialized police units including; Motorcycle Unit, K-9 Unit, Mounted Unit, Dive Team, Detective Bureau, Bicycle Unit, Traffic Unit, Warrant Unit, Special Operations, and the Training/ Firearms/ Subject Control teams.

== Reservations ==
Reservation	Acreage (Hectares)	Notes	Park Amenities	Year Est.	Park Map
Acacia	155 acres (63 ha)	Located in Lyndhurst, the west branch of Euclid Creek flows northwest through Acacia Reservation to join the main creek branch in Euclid Creek Reservation.	Trails, Event hosting.	2012	map
Bedford	2,206 acres (893 ha)	Located in Bedford and Valley View, along Tinker's Creek. Features include Shawnee Hills Golf Course and Tinker's Gorge, which has been named a National Natural Landmark.	Trails, cross country skiing, mountain bike trails, and National Audubon Society's Bird Area Program.	1922	map
Big Creek	781 acres (316 ha)	Located in five Cleveland suburbs, running from Brookpark Road, near Hauserman Road and I-480, south to Whitney Road, below the Ohio Turnpike/I-80. Highlights include Lake Isaac, Beyer's Pond wildlife sanctuary, and the Lake to Lake Trail, all three in Middleburg Heights.	Trails, cross country skiing, sledding.	1919	map
Bradley Woods	795 acres (322 ha)	Located in North Olmsted and Westlake, Bradley Woods is situated on what was originally a quarry for Berea Sandstone. Today, the area has become a forest of red maples, sour gums, tulip trees, yellow birches and pin oaks.	Trails, cross country skiing, fishing.	1962	map
Brecksville	3,494 acres (1,414 ha)	Located in Brecksville, the reservation includes the Sleepy Hollow Golf Course and seven distinct gorges, of which the Chippewa Creek Gorge is the most notable. The Squire Rich Historical Museum is located on the western edge of the park, managed by the Brecksville Historical Society.	Golf, Hiking and cross country skiing trails, bridle trails, outdoor education facility, Brecksville Nature Center, sledding, stables, and a National Audubon Society Bird Area Program.	1920	map
Brookside	145 acres (59 ha)	Originally a neighborhood park in the City of Cleveland, it became part of the Metroparks in 1993. It is immediately adjacent to fellow Metropark installation, the Cleveland Metroparks Zoo. Brookside hosts numerous baseball and football fields and a wildlife area. Big Creek, the largest tributary of the Cuyahoga River, flows through the northern border of the park.	Trails, cross country skiing.	1993	map
Cleveland Metroparks Zoo	165 acres (67 ha)	Main article: Cleveland Metroparks Zoo	With over a million visitors annually, it is Ohio's largest zoo.	1882	map
Euclid Creek	345 acres (140 ha)	Located in Euclid, South Euclid and Richmond Heights, was originally the site of a massive Bluestone quarry. Today, the original reservation is a sanctuary for wildlife and provides a wooded passage from the Heights area down into Euclid. As of a June, 2013 transfer of management from the state to the Park District of properties formerly part of the Cleveland Lakefront State Park, the reservation was expanded to include Euclid Beach Park and the Wildwood-Villa Angela properties with their associated marina and yacht club.	Trails for hiking, horseback riding, cross country skiing and sledding hills.	1920	map
Garfield Park	213 acres (86 ha)	Located in Garfield Heights it was originally named Newburg Park dating back to 1895. In 1986, it was leased to the Metroparks system and was renamed Garfield Park. Its main feature is Mill Creek.	Trails for hiking and cross country skiing, as well as an outdoor education facility.	1986	map
Hinckley	2,682 acres (1,085 ha)	Located in Hinckley Township in Medina County, the reservation is known for the famous 'Annual Return of the Buzzards' as well as Hinckley Lake and its network of glacial ledges, some of which exceed elevations of 350 feet.	Hiking and cross country skiing trails, bridle trails, boating, swimming, fishing, sledding hills, and National Audubon Society's Bird Area Program.	1920	map
Huntington	103 acres (42 ha)	Located in Bay Village on Lake Erie. It is also the location for three Metroparks affiliates: The Lake Erie Nature & Science Center and Schuele Planetarium, the Huntington Playhouse and the BAYarts community art campus.	Hiking and cross country skiing trails, fishing, outdoor education facility, sledding, swimming, and National Audubon Society's Bird Area Program.	1925	map
Lakefront	419 acres (170 ha)	Composed of previously state-run parks (Edgewater Park, Gordon Park, and the East 55th Street Marina) along the Lake Erie shoreline that the Metroparks assumed supervision of in 2013, as well as Merwin's Wharf and Wendy Park at Whiskey Island. Features include numerous beaches, boat ramps, fitness trails, fishing piers, and swimming areas.	Boat ramps, trails, fishing.	2013	map
Mill Stream Run	3,189 acres (1,291 ha)	Added to the system in 1976, this is the largest reservation in the Emerald Necklace. Mill Stream Run is situated along the east branch of the Rocky River and spanning Berea, Middleburg Heights, North Royalton and Strongsville, .	Hiking trails, cross country skiing, mountain bike trails, bridle trails, fishing, outdoor education facility, sledding, toboggan chutes and National Audubon Society's Bird Area Program.	1976	map
North Chagrin	2,140 acres (870 ha)	Located in Mayfield Village, Gates Mills and Willoughby Hills, the North Chagrin Reservation straddles Cuyahoga and Lake Counties and like its smaller neighbor to the south, follows a part of the Chagrin River. While it is the home to the historic Manakiki Golf Course, the reservation's arguably most notable man-made attraction is Squire's Castle. The North Chagrin Reservation also houses one of Northeast Ohio's only old-growth forests, the A.B. Williams Memorial Woods.	Old growth forest, golf, trails, cross country skiing, fishing, golf course, North Chagrin Nature Center, sledding, and National Audubon Society's Bird Area Program.	1925	map
Ohio & Erie Canal	312 acres (126 ha)	Opened in 1999 and stretching through Cuyahoga Heights and Valley View, the reservation follows a portion of the historic 309-mile Ohio and Erie Canal, as well as a section of the Cuyahoga River. Observation decks provide a view of myriad wildlife.	Trails, boating, cross country skiing, mountain bike trails, outdoor education facility, CanalWay Center, and National Audubon Society's Bird Area Program.	1999	map
Rocky River	2,572 acres (1,041 ha)	Located in Rocky River, Berea, Brook Park, Cleveland, Fairview Park, Lakewood, North Olmsted and Olmsted Township, the reservation contains the first parcel of land secured for the establishment of the Metroparks by William A. Stinchcomb—one of the points of interest in the park, in fact, is the Stinchcomb-Grohl memorial. Rocky River reservation boasts three golf courses: Big Met, Little Met and Mastick Woods. Rocky River is also notable for its historically important fossil deposits in the Cleveland Shale, which include some of the best-preserved fossils of the Late Devonian fish Dunkleosteus	Golf, hiking and cross country skiing trails, boating, fishing, sledding hills, horse stables, bridle trails, Rocky River Nature Center, and a National Audubon Society Bird Area Program.	1919	map
South Chagrin	1,521 acres (616 ha)	Spanning sections of Bentleyville, Solon and Moreland Hills, the reservation follows a portion of the scenic Chagrin River and features an Arboretum, a Polo Field, as well as many trails to hike and bike. Henry Church's 1885 sculpture, Squaw Rock, is one of the park's most striking man-made features as it is carved into a large slab of sandstone adjacent the river.	Trails, cross country skiing, fishing, bridle trails, outdoor education facility, sledding.	1925	map
Washington	59 acres (24 ha)	Opened in 2003, this is smallest addition to the Metroparks system. Located in Newburgh Heights, the Washington Golf Learning Center is the most notable feature of the park.	Golf, the Horticultural Center and School, athletic fields, hiking trails and fishing.	2003	map
West Creek	278 acres (113 ha)	Opened in 2006, the West Creek Reservation is one of the newest additions to the Emerald Necklace. The park recently underwent a $12 million renovation, it is now home to the Watershed Stewardship Center. The park, which is home to a wide variety of wildlife, meanders along its namesake, West Creek and is located in Parma.	Trails, mountain bike trails, Watershed Stewardship Center, picnic areas.	2006	map

== Golf Courses ==
Golf Course	Holes	Par	Total Yardage	Summary	Features	Course Map
Big Met	18 Holes	Par 72	6524 Yards	Big Met Golf Course (originally named Course #1), believed to be Ohio's most played golf course, has hosted over 6,000,000 rounds of golf since it opened in 1926. .	Pro shop, snack bar, power and hand cart rental, golf club rental, practice putting greens, watered greens, continuous cart paths, tees and fairways.	map
Little Met	9 Holes	Par 34	2527 Yards	The first Cleveland Metroparks golf course, Little Met (originally named Course #2), was built as a temporary golf course in 1924.	Pro shop, snack bar, power and hand cart rental, practice putting greens, watered greens, tees and fairways.	map
Manakiki	18 Holes	Par 72	6641 Yards	Located 17 miles east of downtown Cleveland, Manakiki Golf Course a public course.	pro shop, golf lessons, snack bar, power and hand cart rental, golf club rental, practice putting green, short game practice area, party rooms, shower service, continuous cart paths, watered greens, tees and fairways.	map
Mastick Woods	9 Holes	Par 31	1900 Yards	The course layout was completed by Harry Burkhardt, the first superintendent of golf for Cleveland Metroparks, and was constructed by Park District staff in 1964.	Pro shop, snack bar, power and hand cart rental, club rental, watered greens, tees and fairways.	map
Seneca	18 Holes	Par 72	6524 Yards	Built by the city of Cleveland, using WPA funds, Seneca Golf Course opened on August 1, 1940.	Pro shop, snack bar, power and hand cart rental, golf club rental, practice putting greens, watered greens, tees and fairways.	map
Shawnee Hills	18 Holes	Par 71	6366 Yards	27 holes, including an 18-hole regulation course and a 9-hole Par 3 course.	pro shop, snack bar, power and hand cart rental, club rental, practice putting greens, driving range, professional golf lessons, watered greens, continuous golf cart paths, tees and fairways.	map
Sleepy Hollow	18 Holes	Par 71	6723 Yards	18 holes.	pro shop, professional golf lessons, snack bar, power and hand cart rental, club rental, practice putting green, driving range, party rooms, shower service, continuous cart paths, watered greens, tees and fairways.	map
Washington	9 Holes	Par 29	1248 Yards	Washington Golf Course comprises a majority of the Washington Reservation. A 9-hole, par 29 golf course and 30-station driving range.	Pro shop, driving range, snack bar, power and hand cart rental, golf club rental, practice putting greens, practice chipping area, continuous cart paths, watered greens, tees and fairways.	map

== Gallery ==
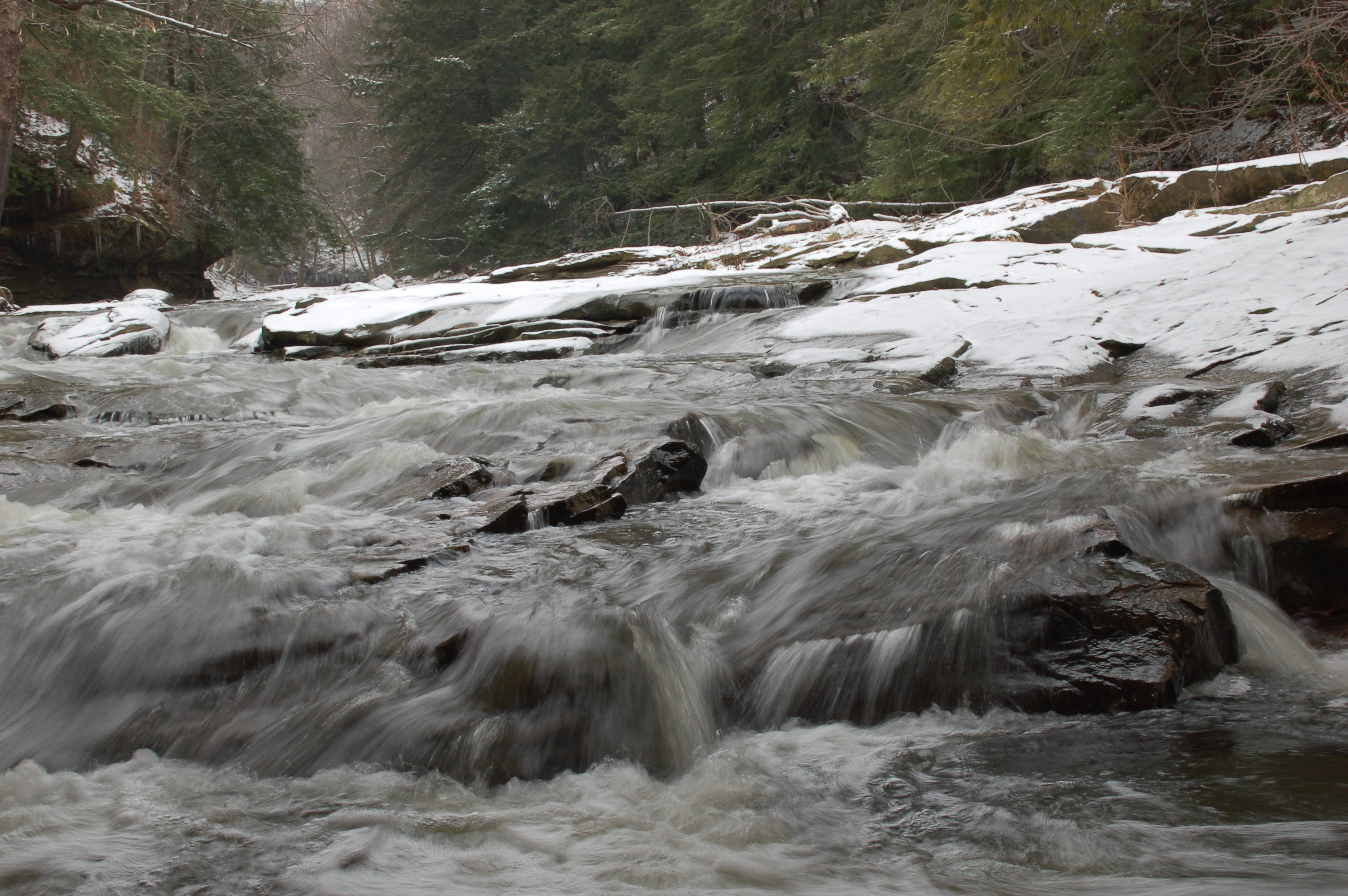
Chippewa Creek in the Brecksville Reservation

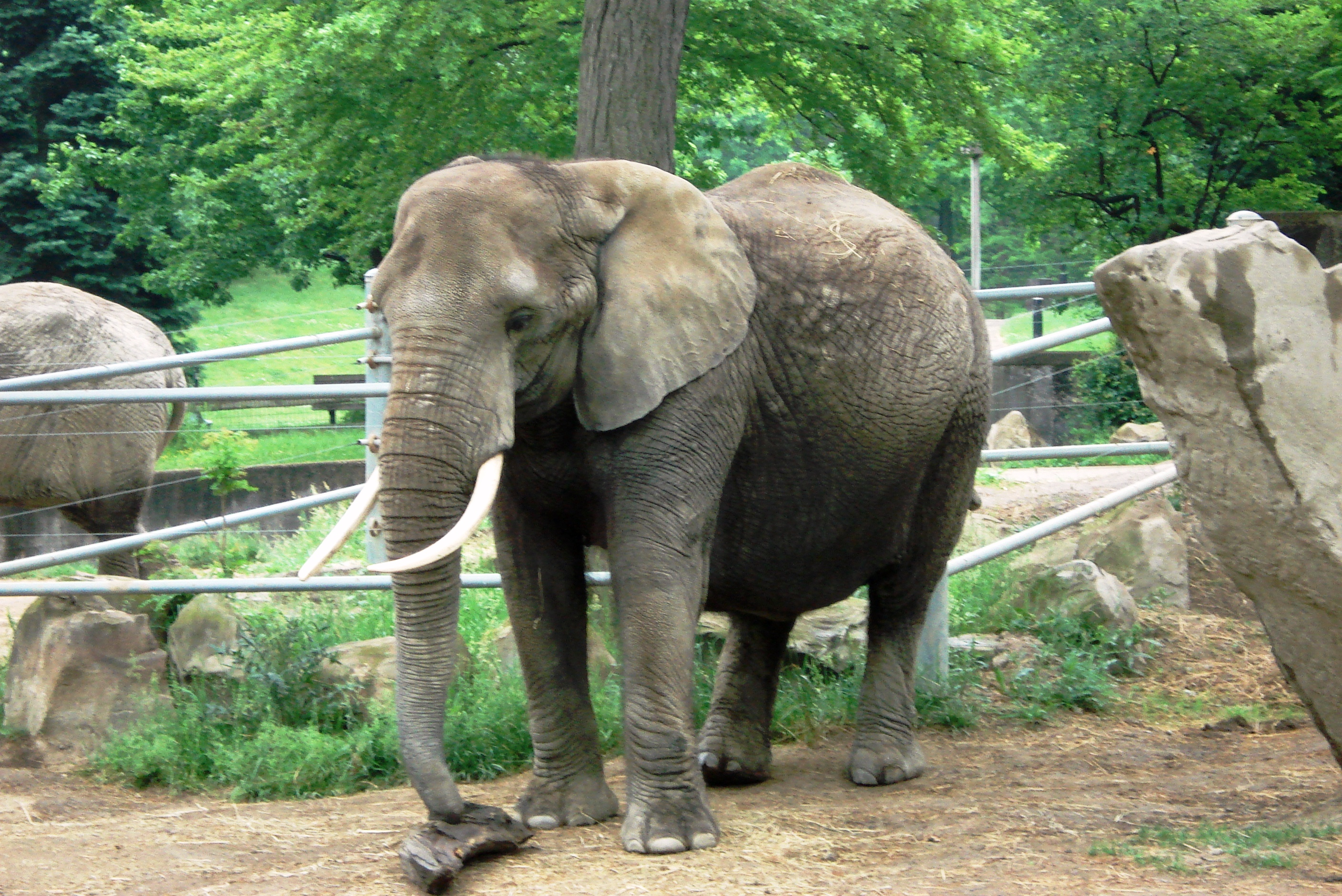
An African elephant at the Cleveland Metroparks Zoo

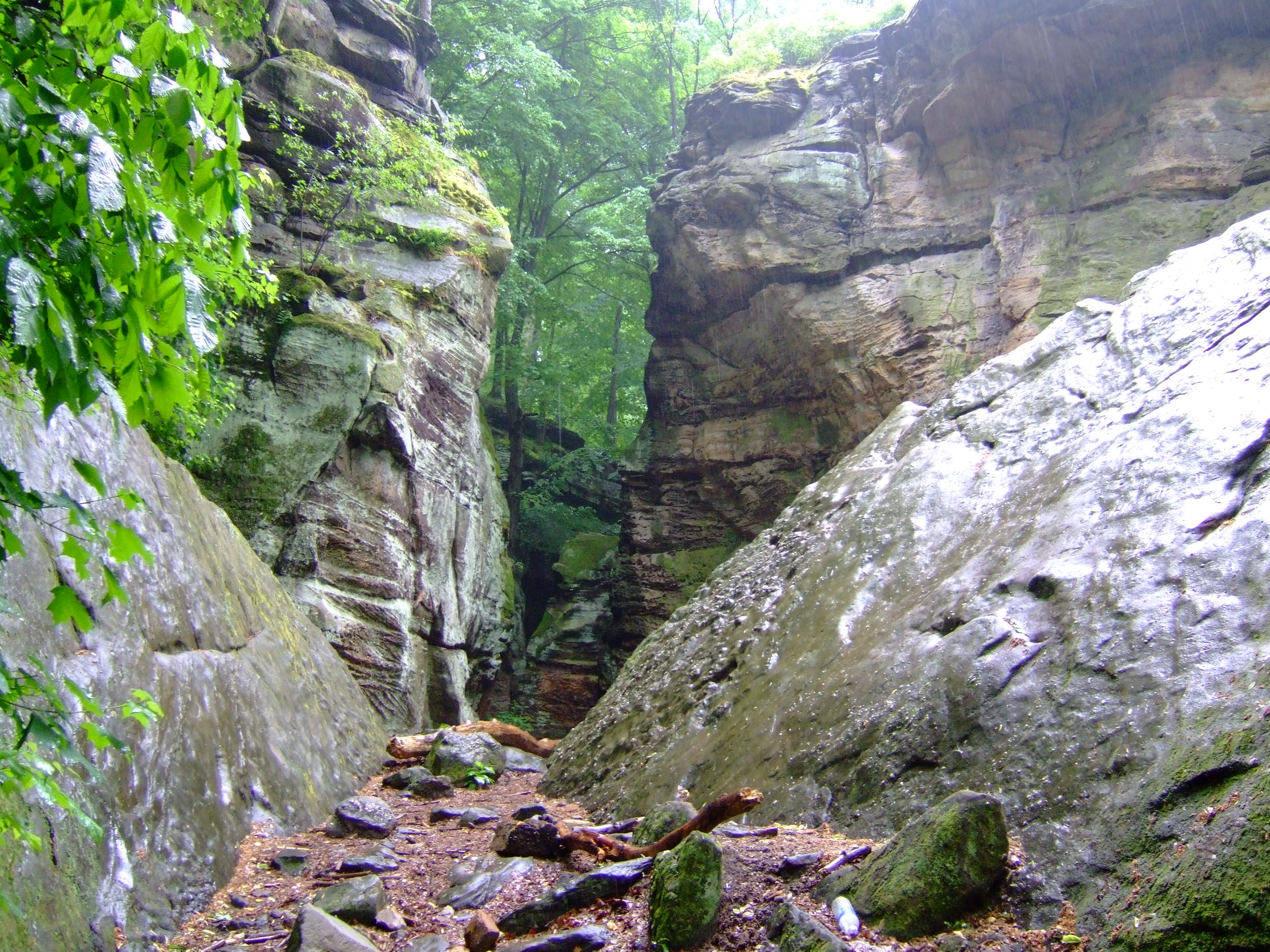
Whipps Ledges at Hinckley Reservation

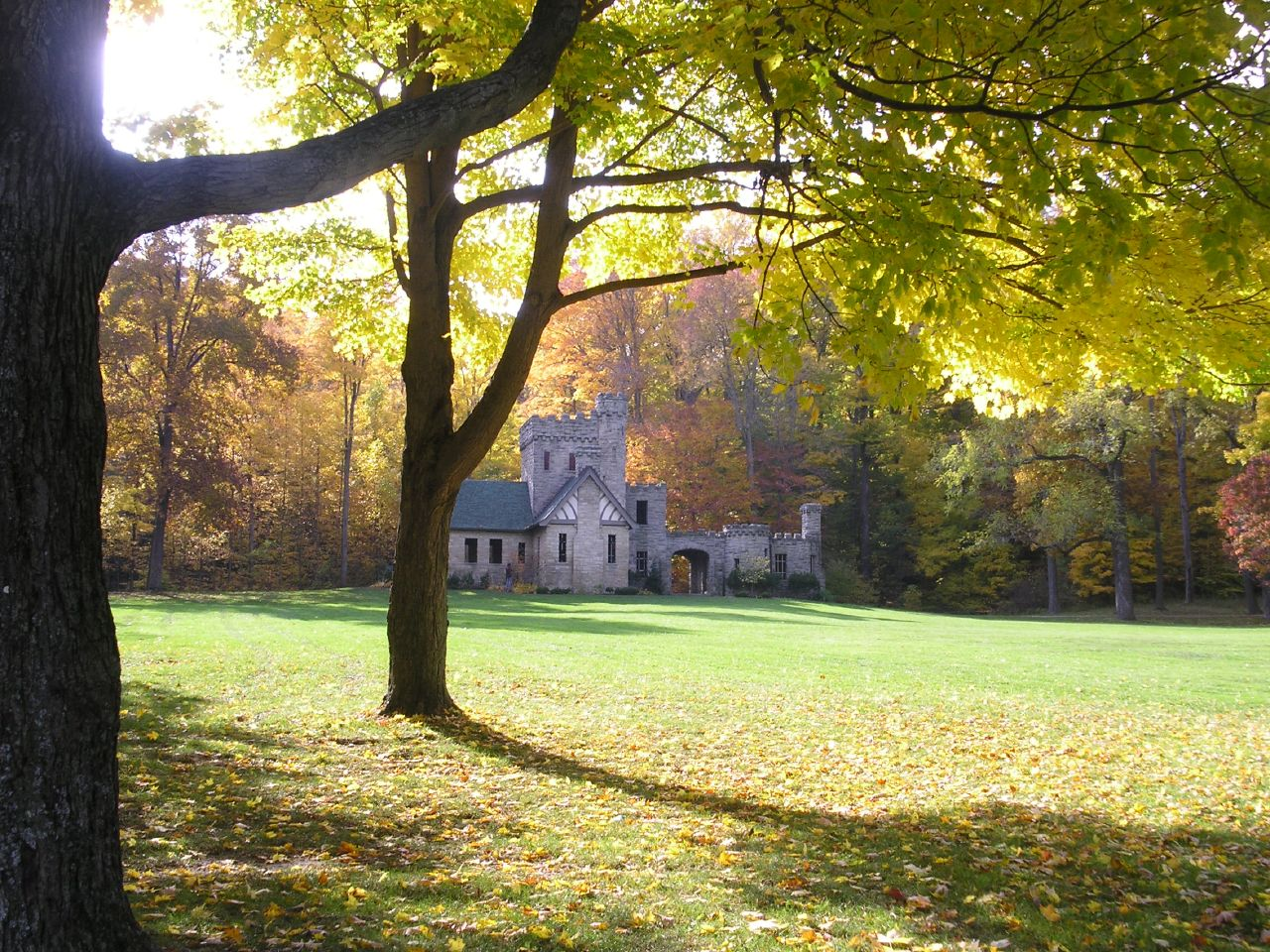
Squire's Castle at the North Chagrin Reservation

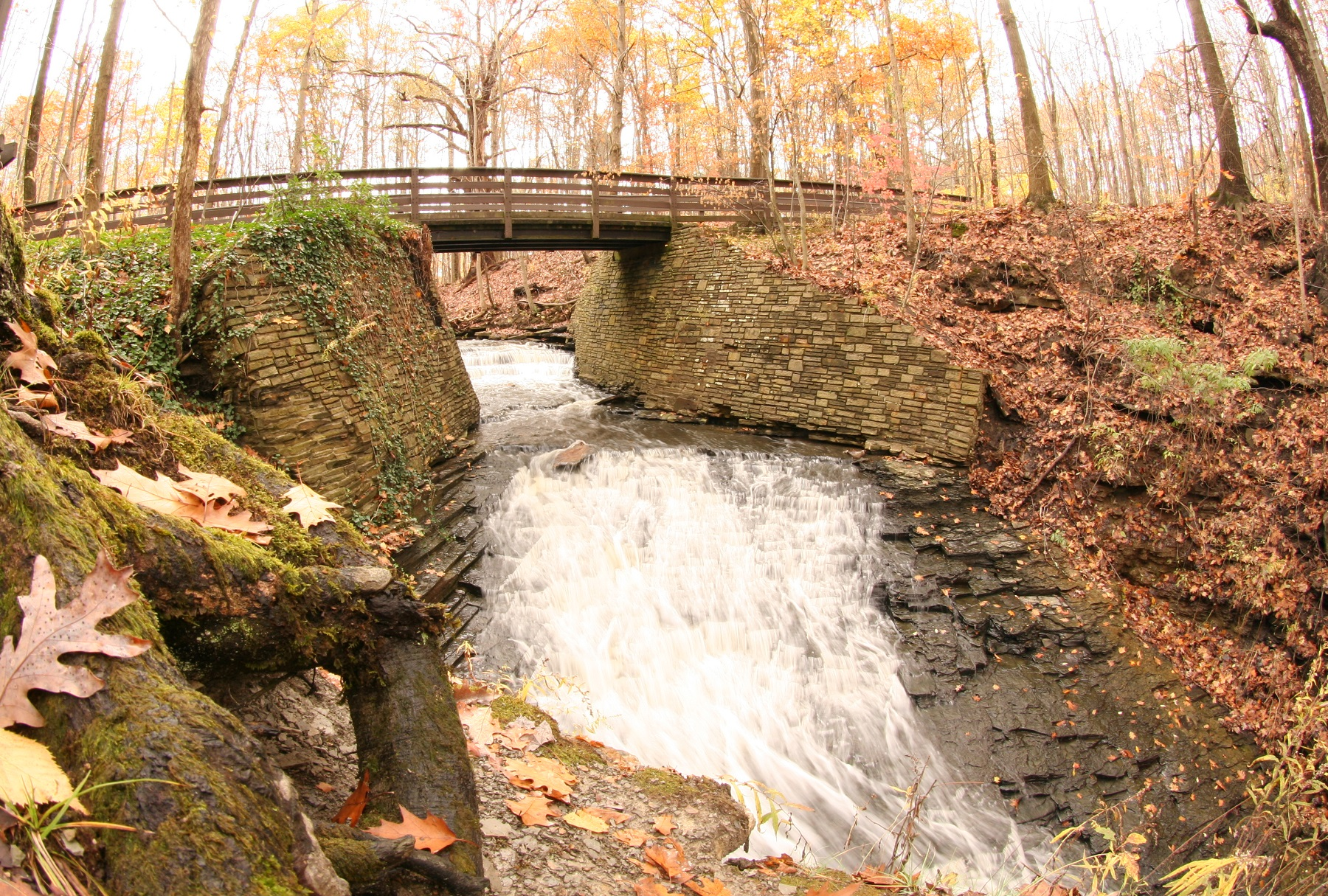
Buttermilk Falls in the North Chagrin Reservation

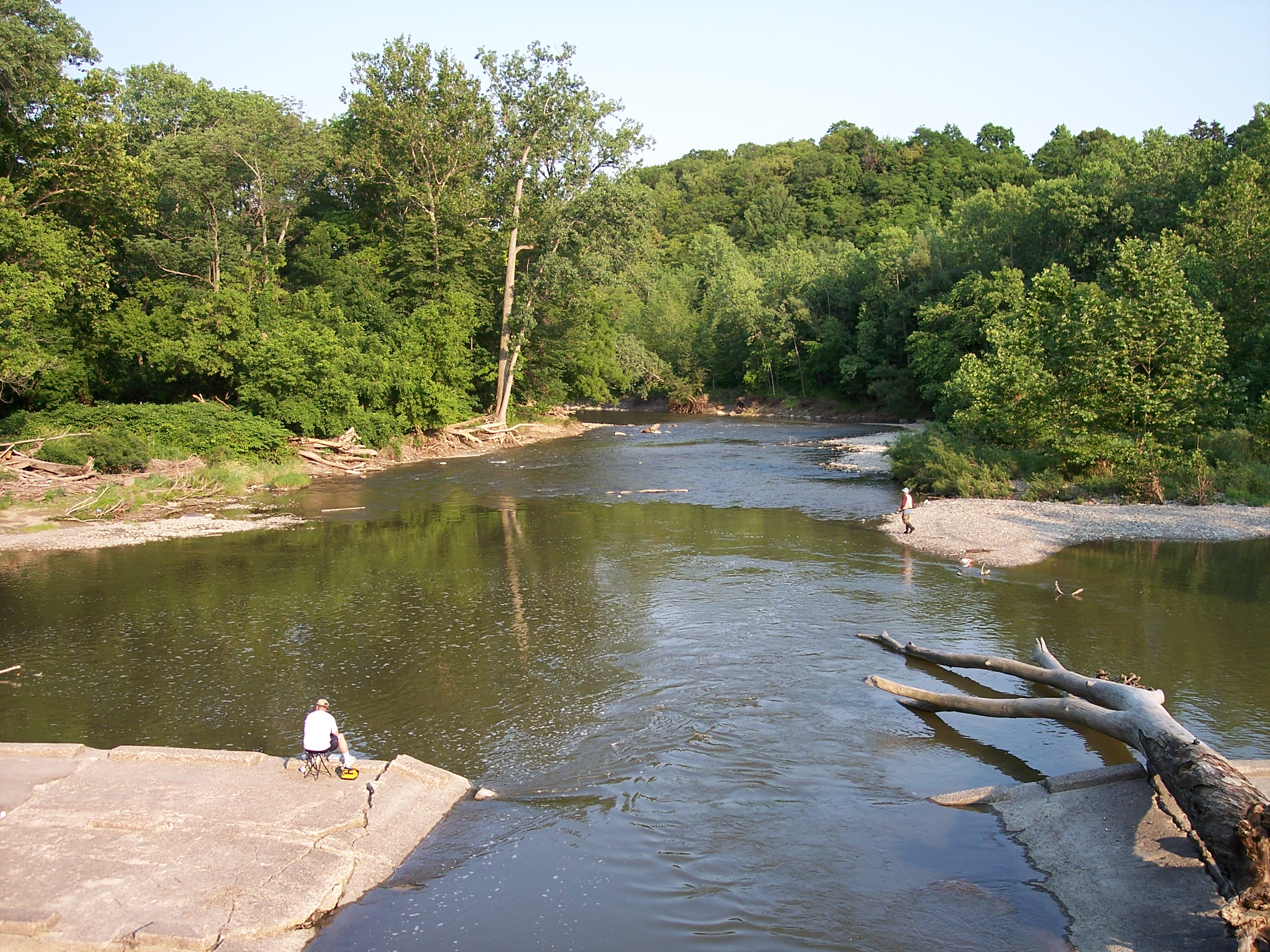
A bend in the Rocky River in the Rocky River Reservation

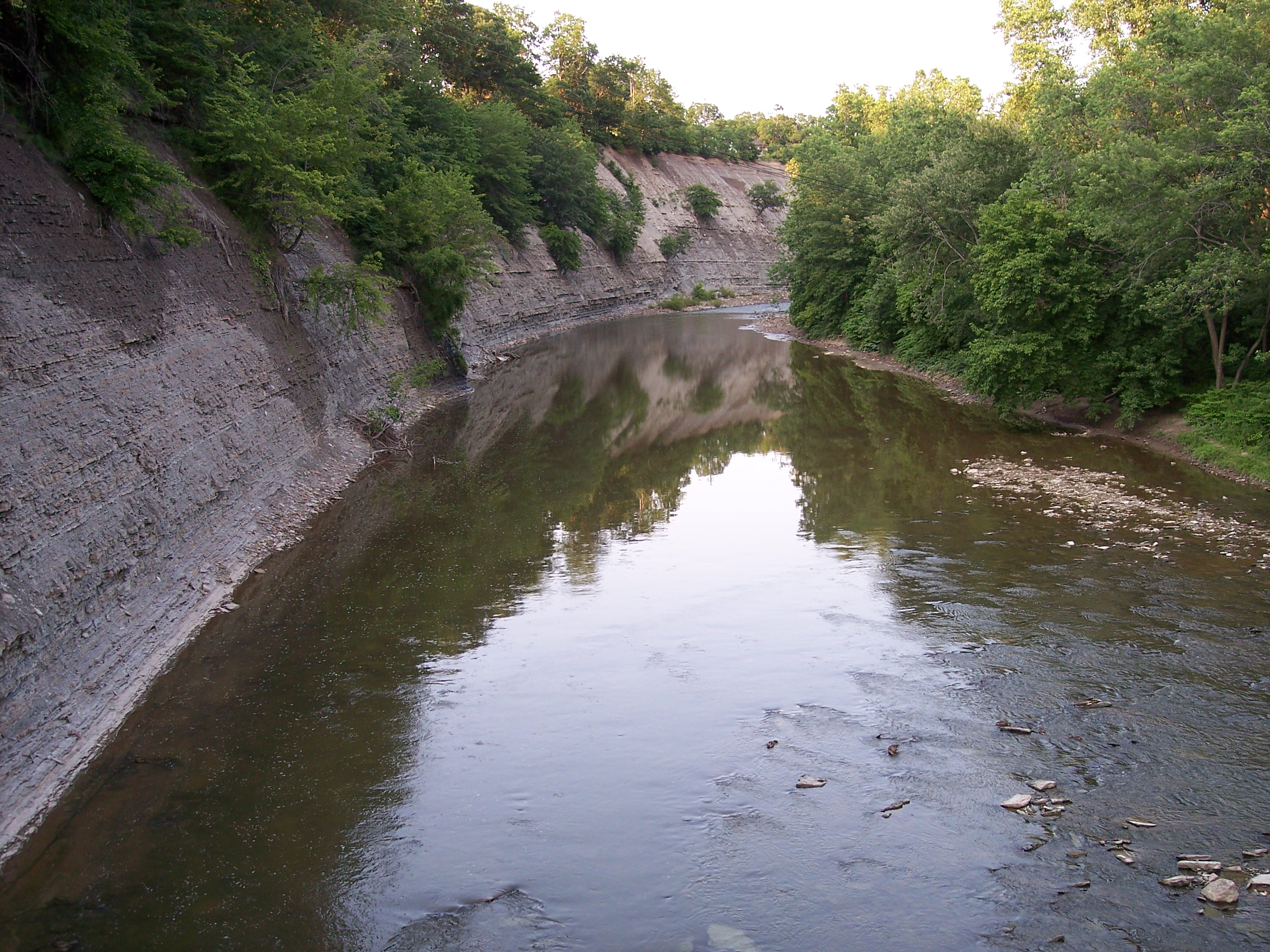
Shale cliffs along the Rocky River in the Rocky River Reservation

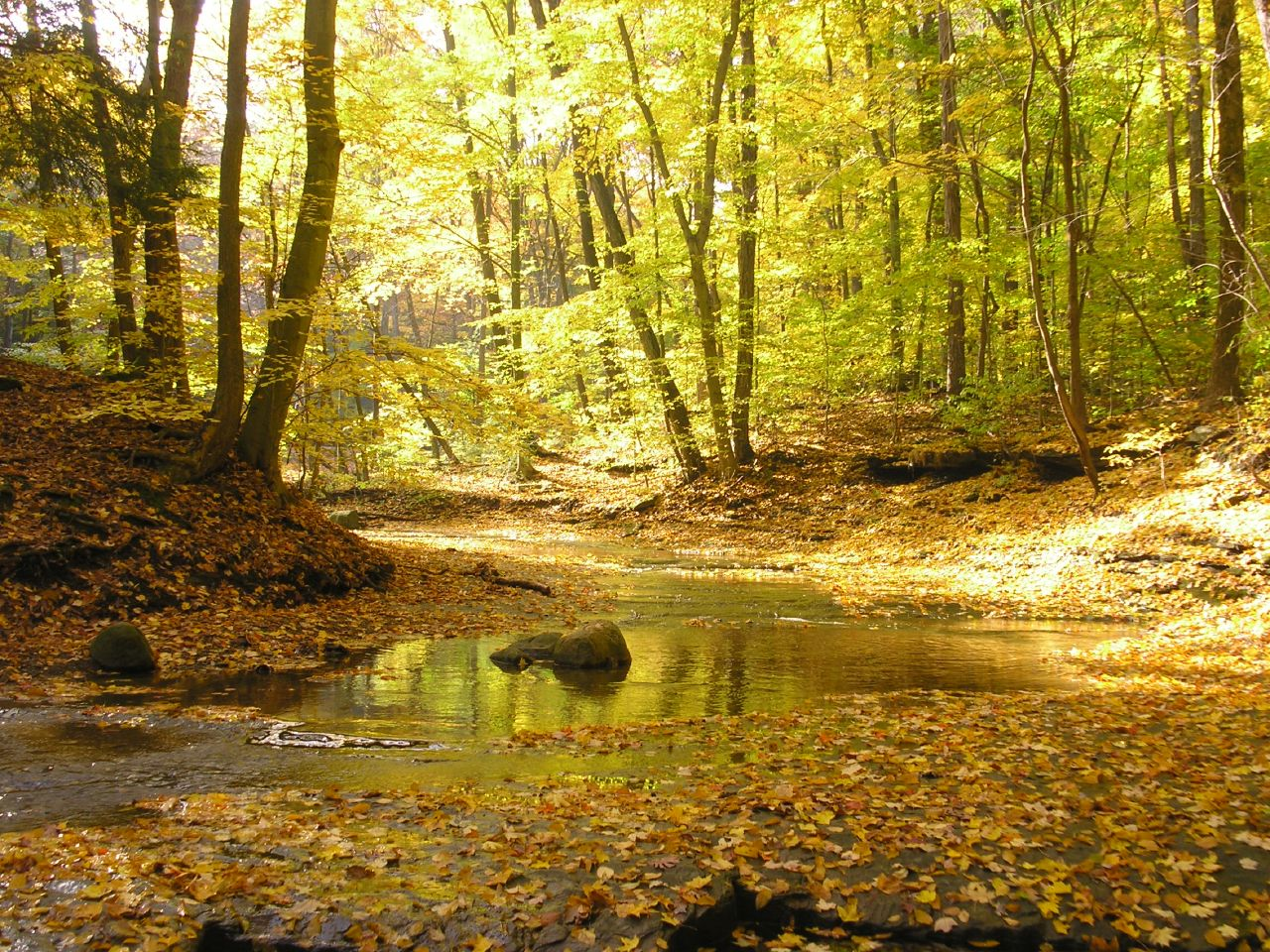
The Chagrin River as viewed from the South Chagrin Reservation

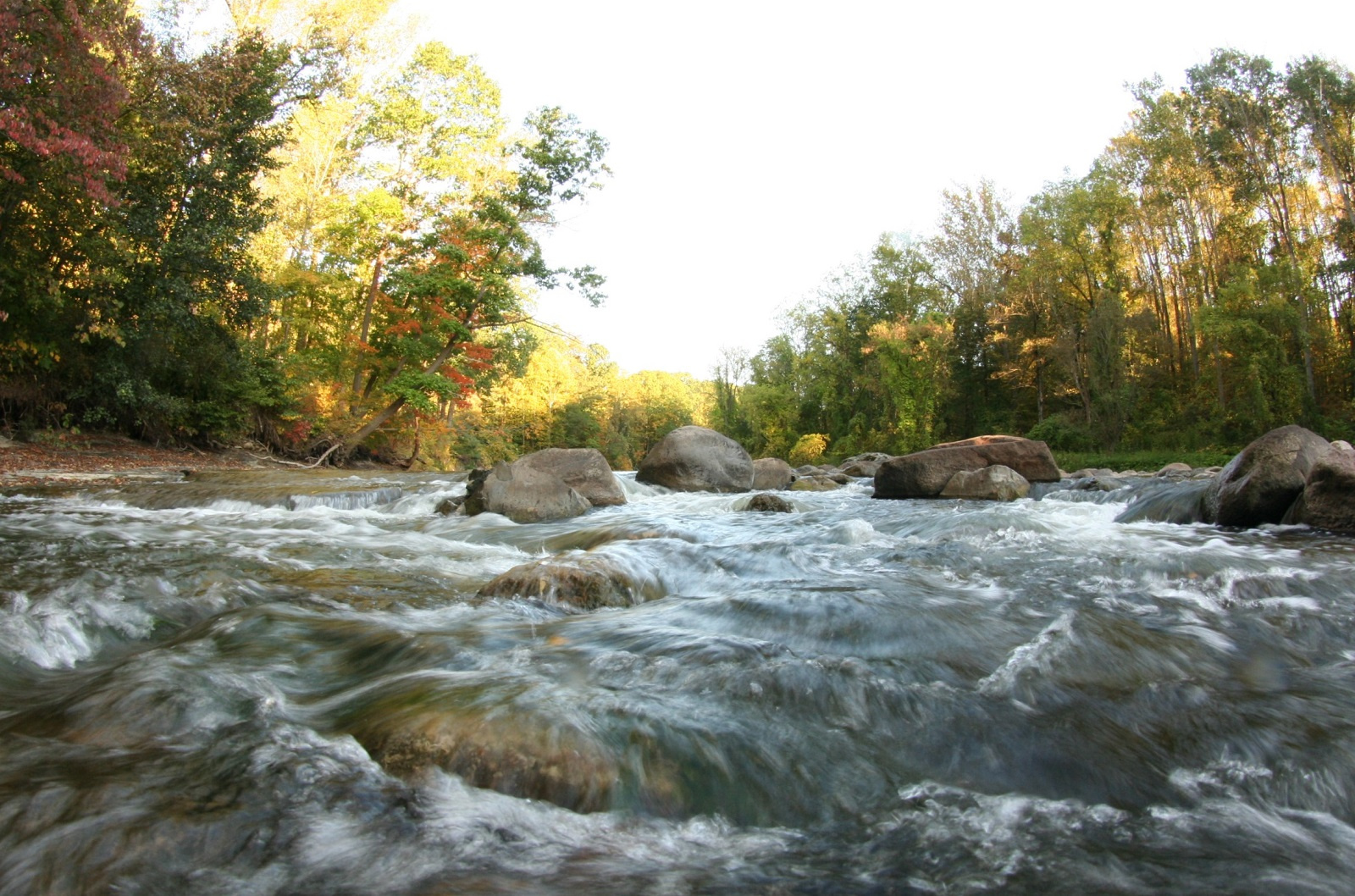
The Chagrin River as viewed from North Chagrin Reservation

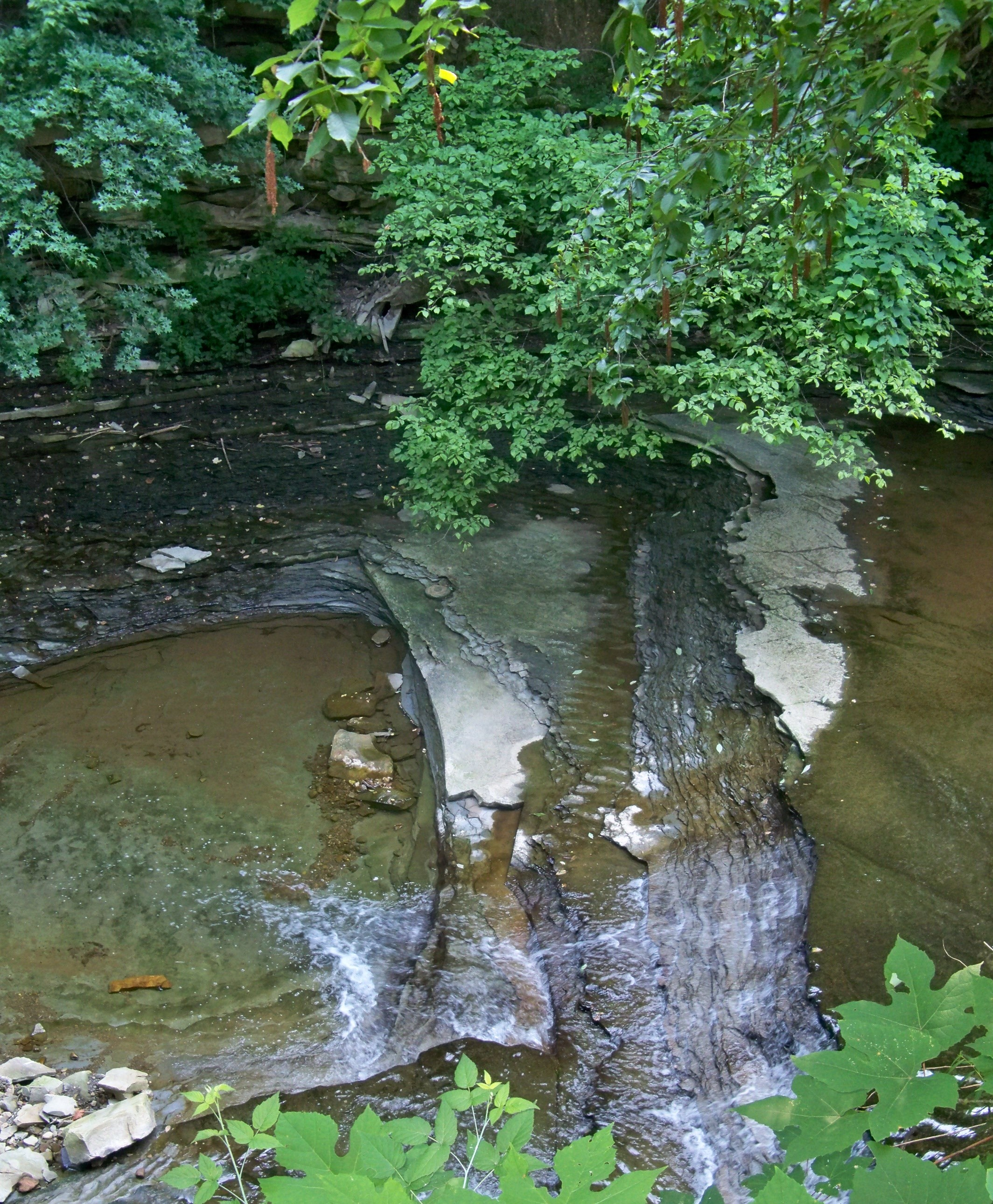
Water falling over the shale creek bed in Euclid Creek Reservation

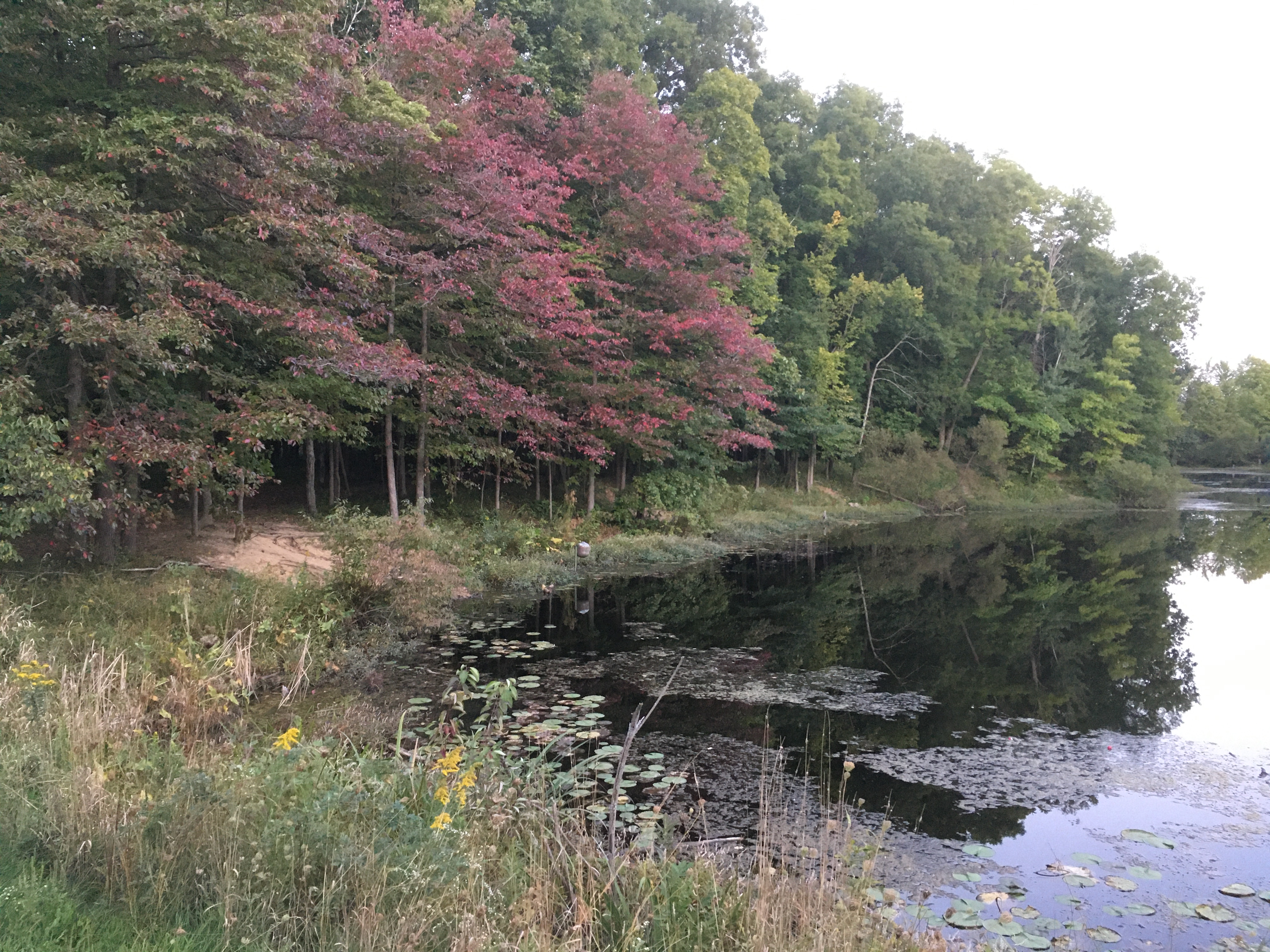
Beyer's Pond, in the Big Creek Reservation, Middleburg Heights

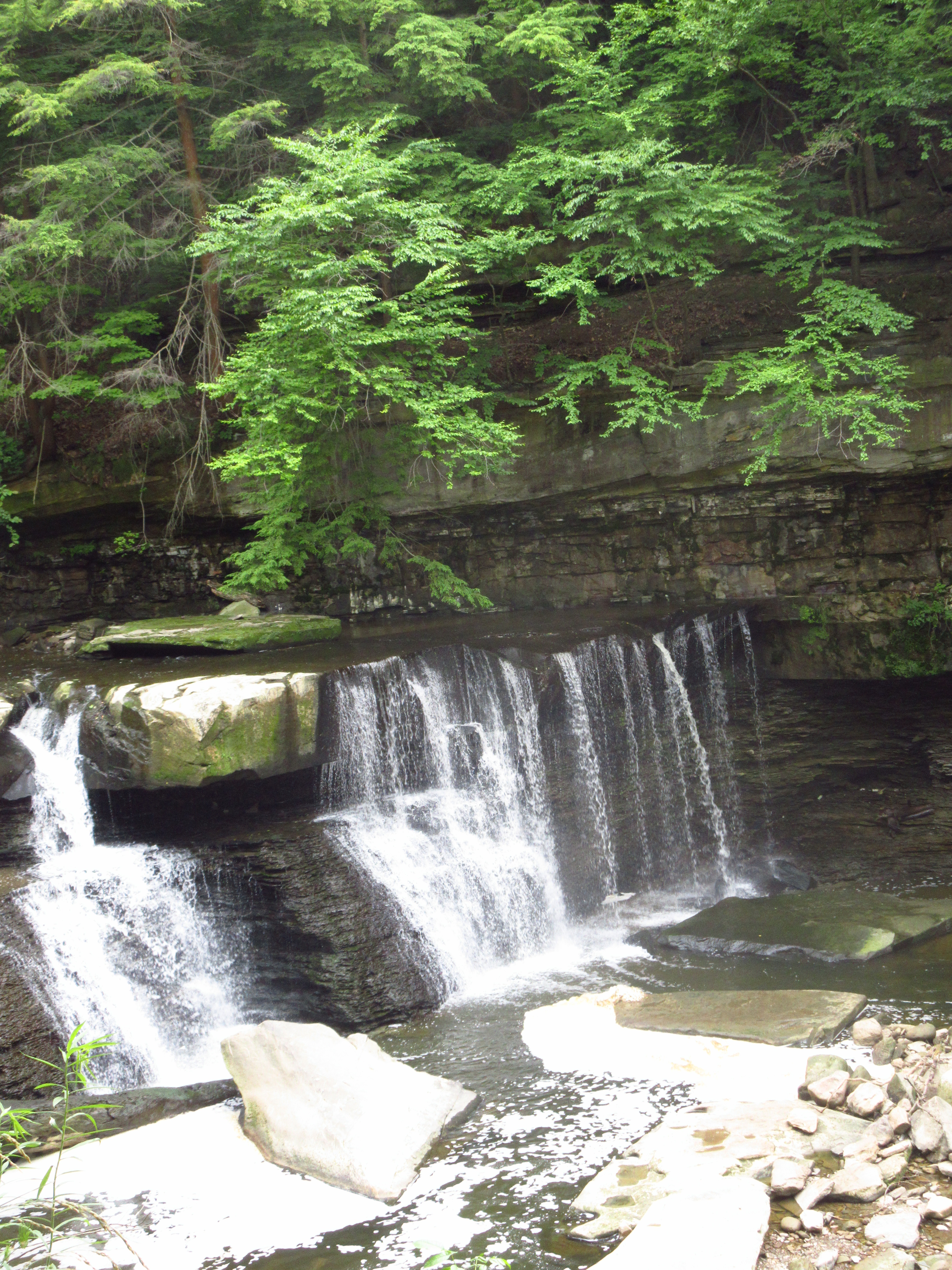
The Great Falls of Tinker's Creek in the Bedford Reservation

== See also ==
- Squire's Castle (North Chagrin Reservation, Willoughby Hills)
