= Holden Arboretum =

Botanical garden in Kirtland, Ohio, United States

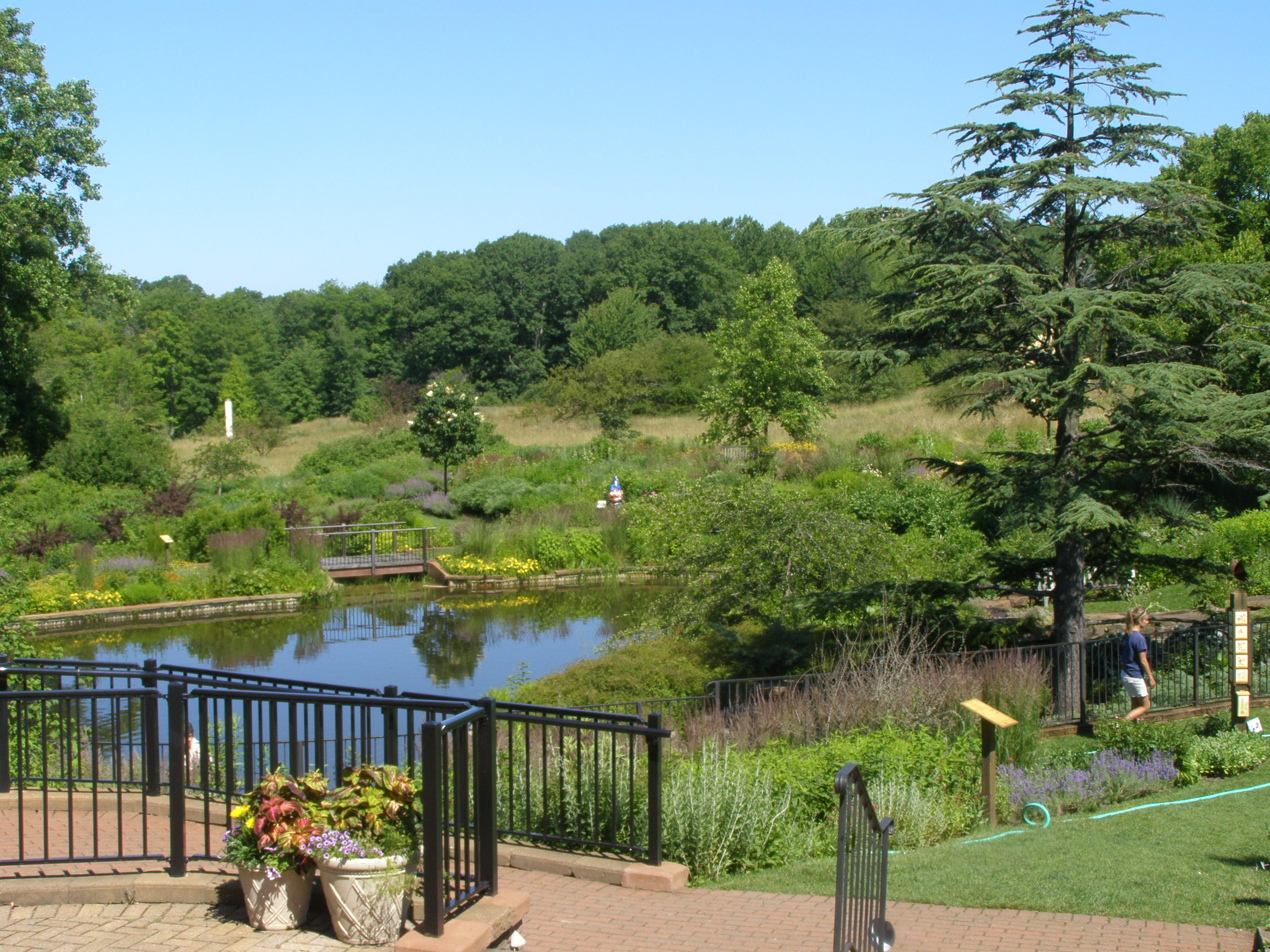
- Lily Pond from the Corning Visitor Center

- Location within Ohio Location within the United States
- Type: Botanical garden
- Location: Kirtland, Ohio
- Coordinates: 41°36′45.21″N 81°18′4.84″W
- Area: 600 acres (240 ha)
- Opened: 1931
- Status: Open year round
- Website: holdenfg.org

The Holden Arboretum, in Kirtland, Ohio, is one of the largest arboreta and botanical gardens in the United States, with more than 3,600 acres (1,500 ha), including 600 acres (240 ha) devoted to collections and gardens. Diverse natural areas and ecologically sensitive habitats make up the rest of the holdings. Holden's collections includes 9,400 different kinds of woody plants, representing 79 plant families.

Specializing in the woody plants that can be grown in the climate of northern Ohio, Holden has a number of specimens obtained during wilderness collection trips, particularly to China and Korea near the 40th parallel, areas with a similar climate to Northeast Ohio. Many Trees like Dawn Redwoods are planted there. Holden is home to two National Natural Landmarks, accessed by guided hikes, and is a Midwest representative for The Center for Plant Conservation. Special gardens include the Myrtle S. Holden Wildflower Garden, the Helen S. Layer Rhododendron Garden, and the Arlene and Arthur Holden Jr. Butterfly Garden. The Holden Arboretum also features extensive Crabapple, Lilac, Viburnum and Conifer Collections.

== History ==
The arboretum is named after Albert Fairchild Holden (1866–1913), a philanthropist and wealthy mining industrialist, founder of the Island Creek Coal Company. He had considered making Harvard University's Arnold Arboretum his beneficiary. However, his sister, Roberta Holden Bole, convinced him that Cleveland deserved its own arboretum. Thus Mr. Holden established an arboretum in memory of his deceased daughter, Elizabeth Davis Holden. When he died in 1913, at age 46, Mr. Holden left a trust agreement in which he provided that funds be designated for an arboretum. After a study of possible sites, Roberta Holden Bole and her husband, Benjamin P. Bole, donated 100 acres (40 ha) in Kirtland Township.

In 1931, the Cuyahoga County Court of Common Pleas approved establishment of The Holden Arboretum. In December 1988, 75 years after Albert Fairchild Holden's original bequest, the Holden Trust began to benefit the arboretum. His permanent endowment, together with the support of other contributors and supporters, made possible the development of a first-class arboretum. The geographic area that Holden has property within comprises two counties, Lake and Geauga, and 5 townships and municipalities.

== Major collections ==
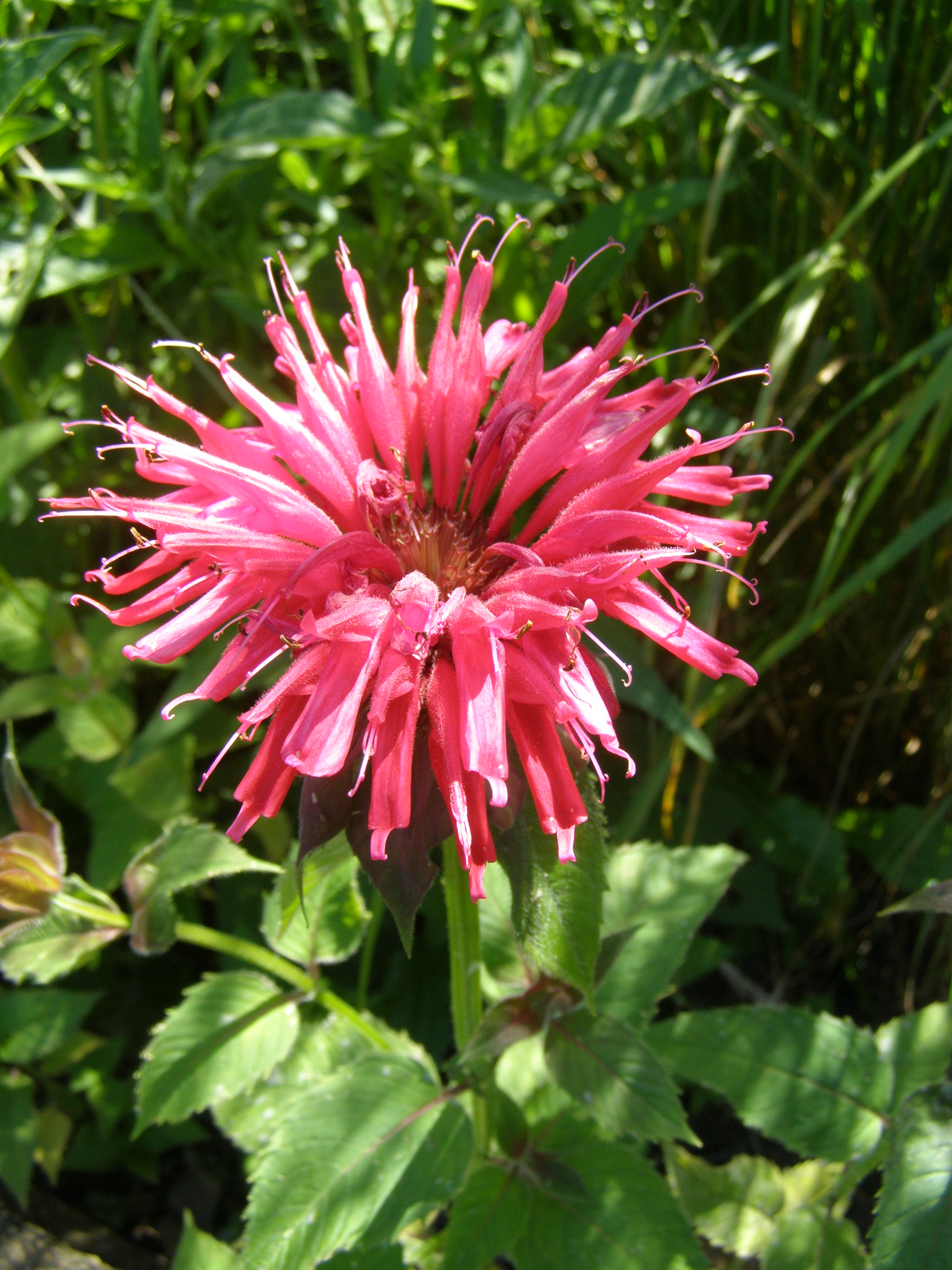
Coreopsis on display.

- The Display Garden maintains a landscaped array of Lilacs, Viburnums, bulbs and companion plantings.
- The Helen S. Layer Rhododendron Garden contains heaths and vernal witch-hazels in March, through to the fall heathers and native witch-hazels in October and November, with over 1,200 rhododendron plants and over 100 mountain laurel plants. This garden is set in a mature oak, beech, and maple forest.
- The Eliot and Linda Paine Rhododendron Discovery Garden, opened in 2013 on 4.5 acres adjoining the Helen S. Layer Rhododendron Garden. The garden offers visitors a chance to learn more about the heath family, Ericaceae, the hybridizers from Northeast Ohio who introduced new rhododendron hybrids to the market, and how to successfully integrate rhododendrons into home landscapes. Leading to the garden is the R. Henry Norweb Tree Allée.
- The Hedge Collection, within the Display Garden, showcases 27 hedges ranging in size from 2 to 8 ft (0.5 to 2.5 m) in height. Some are evergreen, some deciduous, and some are barrier plants with thorns.
- The Conifer and Magnolia Collections contain over 135 magnolia plantings, and over 470 conifer plantings that represent pines, spruces, and firs.

Other major collections of scientific value but not easily accessible to the casual visitor include Maple, Hawthorn, nut-bearing, and specimen trees (a diverse planting of deciduous trees).

== Natural areas ==
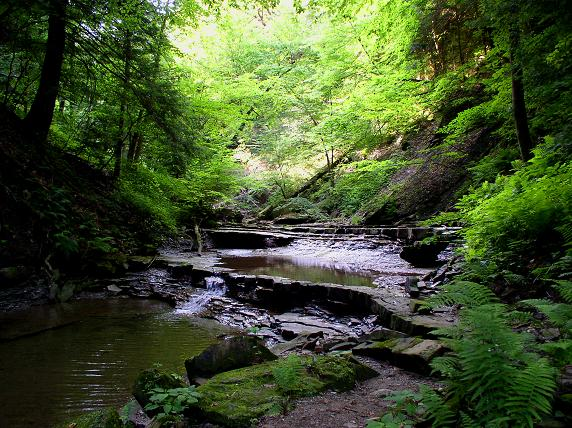
Stebbins Gulch

The majority of land at The Holden Arboretum is maintained in a natural state. Even though it gives the appearance of being untouched, crucial management decisions are always being made to maintain the diversity and health of these areas.

The goal of natural areas management is to maintain and ultimately increase species diversity of both flora and fauna. In order to preserve our native habitats, plant community surveys are conducted by Holden staff to inventory the composition of the existing flora.

Wise management of unique areas such as Bole Woods, Pierson Creek Valley, Stebbins Gulch, and Little Mountain cannot begin until there is an understanding of the plant communities which comprise these areas. To limit damage, areas such as Stebbins Gulch and Little Mountain can only be accessed by visitors on guided tours.

== Research ==
The Holden Arboretum hosts a research program dedicated to ecological research. In 2009, the department received a National Science Foundation grant to examine the role soil organisms play in acquiring limiting nutrients from the soil for forest trees. In 2013, the Holden's research department, in partnership with Kent State University, earned a National Science Foundation Research Experience for Undergraduates(REU) grant. The REU grant project is designed to train the next generation of research scientists and foster an interest in post-graduate education in the fields of science, technology, engineering and mathematics.

== Special events ==
The Holden Arboretum hosts a number of special events and exhibits on the grounds, designed to help people connect with and enjoy the outdoors. Annual events include a spring Arbor Day celebration with family activities; and Goblins in the Garden, a family friendly Halloween celebration. Special exhibits have included David Rodgers Big Bugs (2005); The Holden Express Garden Railroad, created by artist Paul Busse (2007); Gnome and Garden, featuring 20 5-foot-tall garden gnomes decorated by regional artists (2011) and Vanishing Acts: Trees Under Threat, a traveling exhibit created by the Morton Arboretum.

Beginning in 2020, the Arboretum partnered with Tanisha Williams of Black Botanists Week to begin a lecture series called 'Uncovering the Black Botanical Legacy'.

== See also ==
- List of botanical gardens in the United States
