= Arhaus =

American luxury furnishings company based in Ohio

Arhaus, Inc.
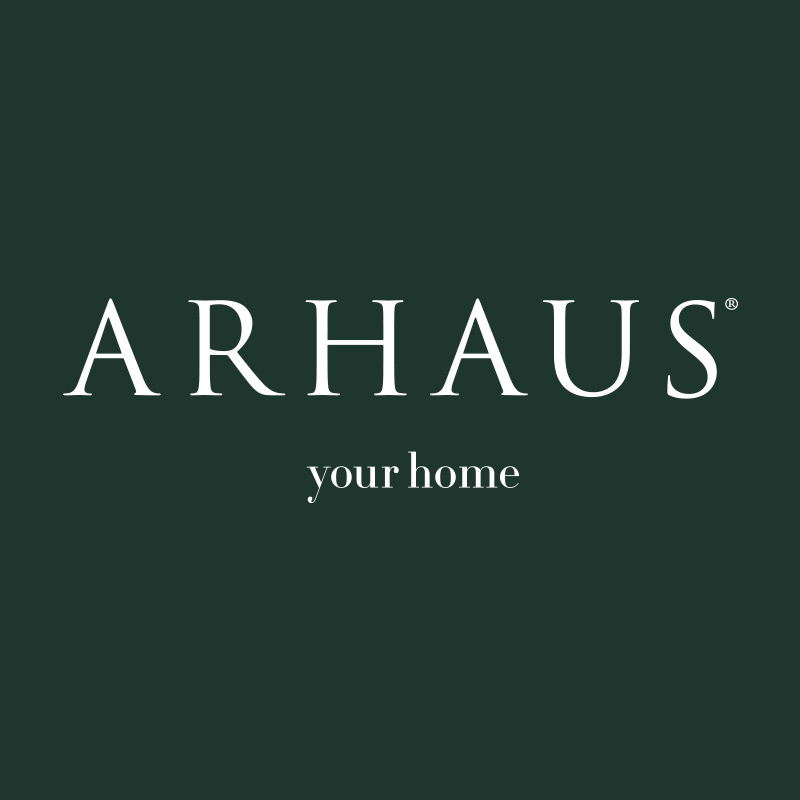
- Type: Public
- Traded as: Nasdaq: ARHS
- Industry: Home furnishings
- Founded: 1986; 40 years ago in Cleveland, Ohio, U.S.
- Founder: Jack Reed; John Reed
- Headquarters: 51 East Hines Hill Road, Boston Heights, Ohio, United States
- Number of locations: 103 (2025)
- Area served: Worldwide
- Key people: John Reed (CEO); Jack Reed (Chairman)
- Revenue: ▲US$1.27 billion (2024)
- Operating income: ▼US$87.5 million (2024)
- Net income: ▼US$68.6 million (2024)
- Total assets: ▲US$1.2 million (2024)
- Total equity: ▲US$343.7 million (2024)
- Number of employees: 2,550 (2024)
- Website: arhaus.com

Arhaus, Inc. is an upscale American home furnishings company headquartered in Boston Heights, Ohio. Founded in 1986 with a focus on sustainability and artisanship in product quality, Arhaus provides a diversified assortment of specialty goods and services addressing omnichannel direct-to-consumer and business-to-business residential and commercial operations.

The company has 103 showrooms in affluent real estate markets in the contiguous United States, in addition to an online store and print catalog for customers worldwide.

== History ==
Arhaus was founded in 1986 by Jack Reed and his son John Reed as a furniture store in a historical building on the East Banks of The Flats of Cleveland, Ohio. Its brand name was conceptualized as a portmanteau of the name of the Danish city Aarhus and the German word haus for house. In the same year, the Reeds began expansion by converting four Workbench franchise stores in the Cleveland and Akron, Ohio metro area into Arhaus storefronts.

The business has spurred significant redevelopment and growth into the 21st century.

In 2013, it reincorporated its corporate entity to be legally registered as Arhaus, Inc. (having previously been incorporated as "Homeworks, Inc." doing business as Arhaus). Headquarters were soon reestablished in Boston Heights, Ohio in 2016. By the end of the 2010s, Arhaus opened its new flagship store at Legacy Village in Lyndhurst, Ohio.

In 2021, in enforcing its commitment to American made product, Arhaus expanded its domestic manufacturing and distribution capabilities with the inauguration of its 500,000 square foot facility in Conover, North Carolina. It listed on the Nasdaq stock exchange on November 4, 2021, with initial public offering valued at $1.75 billion.

The company continued strategic focus on expanding its physical presence with openings including Greenwich, Connecticut, and Palo Alto, California, in 2024.

=== Growth ===
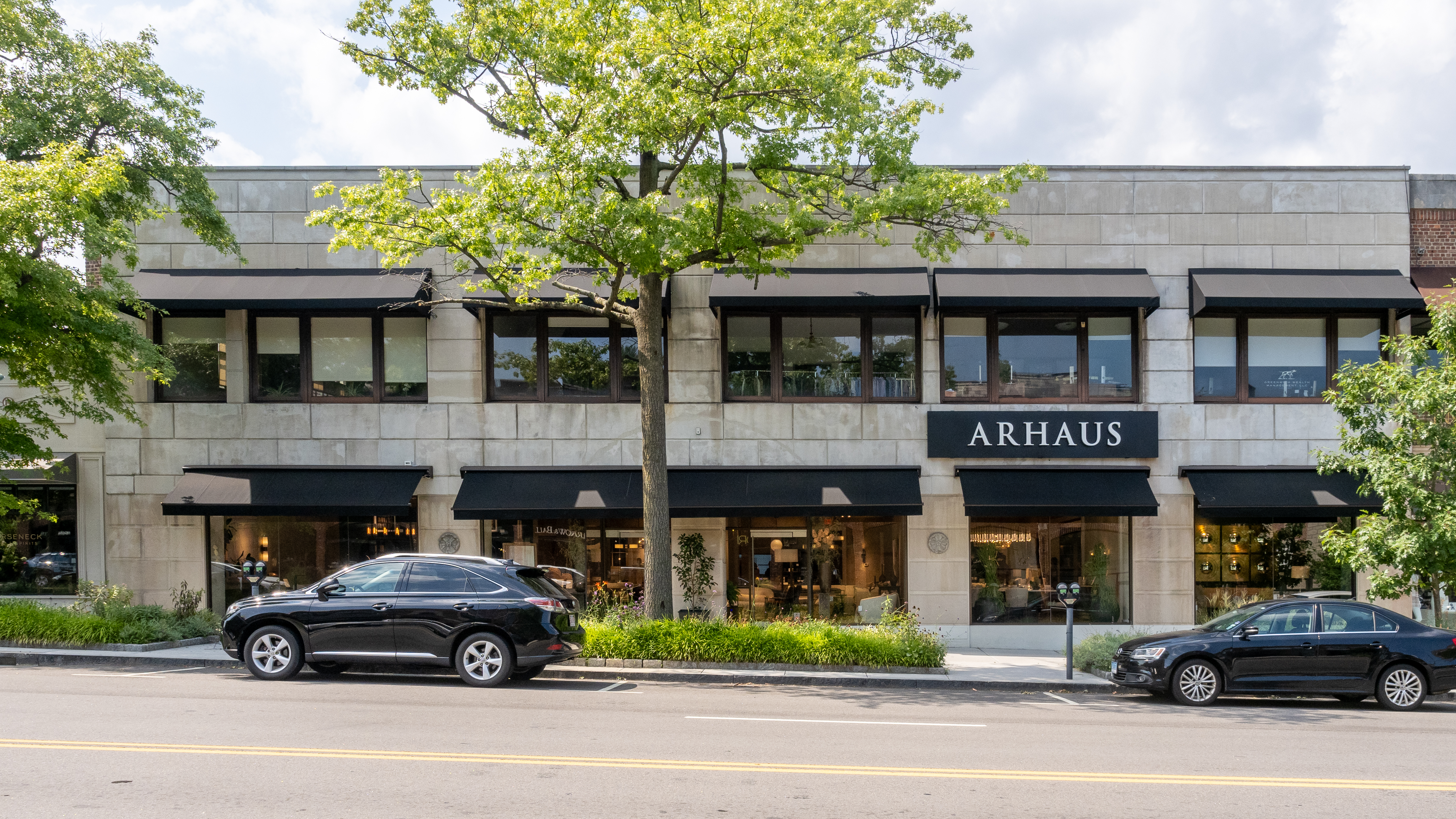
An Arhaus Store in Greenwich, Connecticut

As of 2024, the chain had 92 locations across 29 states. The company has opened in-mall locations, including anchor stores, as well as freestanding locations as part of open air shopping centers. In 2014, Arhaus opened their first locations in Arizona and California in addition to six other stores. In 2015, Arhaus opened seven new stores, including locations in Louisiana and Kansas, bringing total store count up to 60 by the end of the year. Arhaus opened multiple New York locations in 2016 as well as another location in Texas. In 2017, Arhaus opened its first Alabama and Wisconsin locations as well as another California location, increasing store count to 70. In April 2024, Arhaus opened a 5,300-square-foot showroom in Greenwich, Connecticut. This was the third showroom the company opened in Connecticut, including the other two located in Farmington and Norwalk.

== Products ==
Arhaus sells home furniture and decor products such as sofas, dining tables and chairs, bedroom furniture, bedding, media centers, tableware, rugs and lighting. The company adapts its storefronts to reflect local markets and influences.

According to Arhaus, the company does not source materials from endangered rainforests for its furniture. The company reports that around 50% of its product incorporates recycled materials.

Arhaus sells "relics" as a part of their product offering. "Relics" are antiques that have been purchased by the company, refurbished or repurposed, and then are sold off the floor by Arhaus.
