= Lacustuary =

Body of water with mixed river and lake water

A lacustuary is a freshwater body of water where river and lake waters mix. Lacustuaries are nonmoving or "slack" water, although water in them can ebb and flow due to lake waves moving in and out, and the rising and falling of lake water levels.

A lacustuary is that portion of a freshwater river or stream where lake water and river/stream water mix. The upper boundary of the lacustuary is that portion of the river directly affected by rising and falling water levels in the lake. Lacustuaries are generally nonmoving or "slack" water. (Note: In the context of lacustuaries, slack water is where the water velocity less than 0.1 knots (0.19 km/h; 0.12 mph) and there is only weak current.)

Lacustuaries are not estuaries. They are far less saline, as lacustuaries are freshwater bodies. Additionally lacustuaries tend to be less saline the closer to the lake, where as estuaries are more saline the closer to the ocean. Lacustuaries also have different functions than estuaries. Their physical and biological characteristics are also much different from the free-flowing water further upstream, and they play important roles in the ecology of both lake and river ecosystems. Lacustuary vegetation is also markedly different from shoreline and upland habitats.

Not all streams which enter a lake have a lacustuary. Man-made ship channels may also be lacustuaries, depending on their slack water status.

Biological characteristics The biota of a lacustuary is dominated by plant and animal species adapted to lacustrine conditions. Common plants species observed in Ohio (Thoma: personal observation) were Pondweeds (Potamogeton sp.) and Eelgrass (Vallisneria) in clean, clear waters. Eurasian Watermilfoil (Myriophyllum spicatum) and Elodea sp. dominate in polluted, turbid waters.

In clean waters fish communities are dominated by native Sunfish (Lepomis sp.), Minnows of several genera, and other phytophilic species such as Yellow Perch (Perch flavescens). In polluted, turbid, and organic enriched waters non-native fish species such as Common Carp (Cyprinus carpio) can dominate in both numbers and biomass. Specifically, in Lake Erie the non native White Perch (Marone americana) and Gizzard Shad (Dorosoma cepedianum, possibly not native to the Great Lakes) can also display large numbers.

== Citations ==
Notes

Citations

== Bibliography ==
- Thoma, Roger F. (1999). "Biological Monitoring and an Index of Biotic Integrity for Lake Erie's Nearshore Waters". In Simon, Thomas P. (ed.). Assessing the Sustainability and Biological Integrity of Water Resources Using Fish Communities. Boca Raton, Fla.: CRC Press. ISBN 9780849340079.
- Brant, Russell A.; Herdendorf, Charles E. (1972). "Delineation of Great Lakes Estuaries". Proceedings of the 15th Conference of Great Lakes Research. Ann Arbor, Mich.: International Association for Great Lakes Research.
- Letterhos, Julie A.; Thoma, Roger F. (1998). "Lake Erie Basin Monitoring: An Ohio EPA Perspective". Proceedings of the 41st Conference of Great Lakes Research. Ann Arbor, Mich.: International Association for Great Lakes Research.
- Ohio Environmental Protection Agency (February 2010). Compensatory Mitigation Requirements for Stream Impacts in the State of Ohio (Revision 5.0). Interested Party Review Draft (PDF). Columbus, Ohio: Ohio Environmental Protection Agency.
- Woodworth, R.W.; Haight, F.J. (1927). Tides and Currents in Southeast Alaska. Special Publication 127. Serial No. 354. Washington, D.C.: U.S. Coast and Geodetic Survey.
