= Legacy Village =

Lifestyle center in Lyndhurst, Ohio

Coordinates: 41.503411°N 81.50185°W

Legacy Village is a lifestyle center in Lyndhurst, Ohio. Legacy Village combines upscale dining, shopping, and entertainment. Anchored by Dick's Sporting Goods, Nordstrom Rack, and Arhaus. The center is occupied by notable names, such as J.Crew Factory, Lilly Pulitzer, and LOFT.

== History ==
On October 24, 2003, Legacy Village opened to much fanfare. First day tenants included Joseph-Beth Booksellers, Crate & Barrel, and full-line Talbots. Upon its opening, 60% of its stores were new to Ohio. Located at the intersection of Cedar and Richmond Roads, it stands on a portion of the former TRW headquarters property, which was previously the Dudley S. Blossom estate. During opening day celebrations, Legacy Village was so busy that police officers were needed to direct traffic. While traffic became more normalized and regulated in the following months, the complex was built near an already busy intersection, and Legacy Village did not contain the amount of parking spaces required by city law, even though Lyndhurst voters had already changed the laws for parking spaces specifically to benefit the complex. Parking meters were installed along the center section of the complex, and "parking tickets" that were not legally binding were issued to those parked at expired meters, which led to increased calls to the local police station. Legacy Village officials stated that proceeds from parking tickets were donated to charity.

About a month after its opening, architecture critic Steven Litt complained in The Plain Dealer that Legacy Village was "a shopping center in the midst of a vast parking lot". He stated that the design, which sets some restaurants apart from the "village" mall area, created problems for foot traffic, and decried the center as a failed experiment in New Urbanism.

Despite the criticism, Legacy Village had an extremely successful first year, netting over $225 million and pulling shoppers to the area from far-away towns. The complex celebrated with a birthday cake and fireworks.

In June of 2013, the Apple Store closed at Legacy Village, relocating to nearby Eton-Chagrin Boulevard.

During the summer weekends, the complex hosts a series of outdoor concerts which it has dubbed Legacy Live.

== Anchor/Key Tenants ==
- Arhaus
- Crate & Barrel
- Dick's Sporting Goods
- LA Fitness
- Giant Eagle
- L.L.Bean
- Nordstrom Rack
