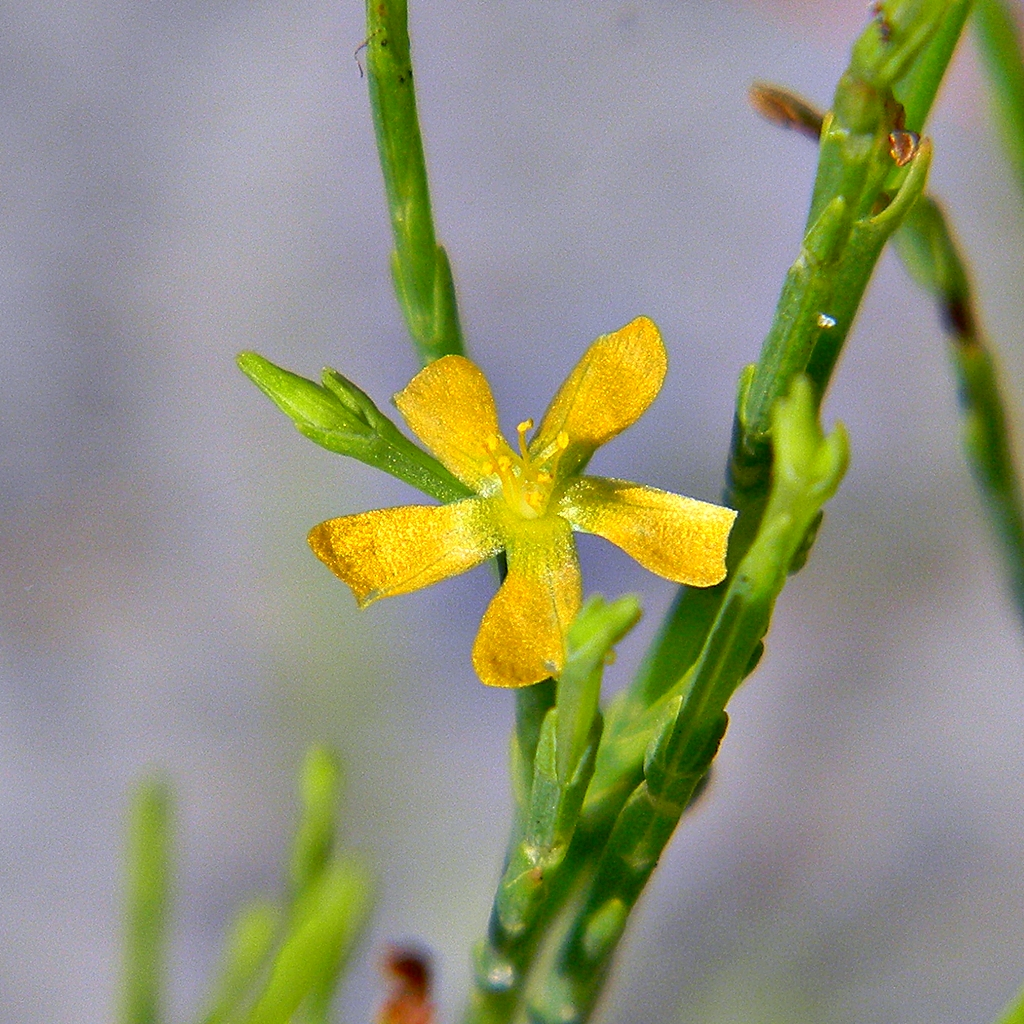

Scientific classification
- Kingdom: Plantae
- Clade: Tracheophytes
- Clade: Angiosperms
- Clade: Eudicots
- Clade: Rosids
- Order: Malpighiales
- Family: Hypericaceae
- Genus: Hypericum
- Section: H. sect. Brathys
- Species: H. gentianoides

Binomial name
- Hypericum gentianoides (L.) Britton, Sterns & Poggenb.

Synonyms
- Sarothra gentianoides L.

= Hypericum gentianoides =

Species of flowering plant in the St John's wort family

Hypericum gentianoides is a species of flowering plant in the St. John's wort family Hypericaceae. Its common names include orangegrass and pineweed.

Native to eastern North America, it ranges from Ontario; Nova Scotia and Maine south to Florida, west to Texas, and north to Missouri and Minnesota. It has been observed growing in habitats such as fields, flatwoods, and rock outcrops.

It is an annual herb typically growing 10–40 cm (4–16 in) tall. The leaves are repressed against the stem, 1–3 mm long, and scale-like; an adaptation to reduce transpiration in exposed environments. The flowers are no more than 3 mm across, with five to ten stamens, and three styles. It commonly grows in nutrient poor soil, sand, and on exposed sites, but is also known to occur in wetter areas such as coastal plain marshes. The name orangegrass refers to the citrus smell that is released when it is crushed. Chemical extracts of H. gentianoides have been found to inhibit the contraction of HIV.
