= Carol Dunlop =

Canadian writer and photographer

- Born: April 2, 1946; Quincy, Massachusetts, U.S.
- Died: November 2, 1982 (aged 36); Paris, France
- Occupations: Writer, translator, activist, photographer
- Spouse: Julio Cortázar
- Writing career
- Notable work: The Autonauts of the Cosmoroute (1982)

Carol Dunlop (April 2, 1946 – November 2, 1982) was a Canadian writer, translator, activist and photographer. She is best known for being the co-author, with her husband the Argentine writer Julio Cortázar, of the book The Autonauts of the Cosmoroute (1982).

== Biography ==
Dunlop was born in Quincy, Massachusetts. She was the oldest of two daughters born to Daniel M. and Jean (Ayers) Dunlop. She attended Lake Erie College, in Painesville, Ohio, on a creative writing scholarship and graduated from McGill University. She married writer François Hebert, with whom she had one son, Stephane, born in 1968. The couple settled in Montreal, Quebec, but divorced sometime in the 1970s, and Dunlop eventually moved to Paris. Dunlop met the writer and activist Julio Cortázar in Canada in 1977 and married him in 1981. She accompanied Cortázar on trips to a number of destinations and sometimes traveled without him. Among the places she visited in the course of her political activism were Nicaragua and Poland; in the latter country, she participated in a congress of solidarity with Chile. She died two years before Cortázar and is buried with him in the Montparnasse Cemetery.

== Cause of death ==
There is disagreement about the official cause of Carol Dunlop's death.

According to Cortázar's biographer Miguel Herráez, Dunlop died of "bone marrow failure" ("aplasia medular") and Cortázar of leukemia. Testimonies given by Dunlop's son, Stephane Hebert, and her first husband, Francois Hebert from Montreal, support the bone marrow illness diagnosis. Similarly, many of Dunlop and Cortazar's friends witnessed Dunlop's prolonged sickness, long before Cortázar's alleged HIV contraction. Her ex-husband, for instance, recalls Dunlop regularly being hospitalized in the early 1970s to undergo blood transfusions, a common treatment for blood marrow failure. Singer-songwriter and poet Joe Dolce, who took her to his Harvey High School Senior Prom in 1965 when she was a sophomore at Lake Erie College in Painesville, Ohio, recalled that she was very fragile and it was common knowledge amongst her closest college friends that she was struggling with a chronic illness.

In her book Julio Cortázar, the Uruguayan writer Cristina Peri Rossi, who was a friend of Cortázar and Dunlop, stated that both died of AIDS. Peri Rossi maintained that Dunlop had sexually contracted AIDS from Cortázar, who had himself contracted the illness from a blood transfusion he received a few years earlier in the south of France. There is no concrete evidence available to prove this theory.

== Notable works ==
- Les enfants du sabbat. (Paris: Éditions du Seuil, 1975), ISBN 2-02-006564-9 – Children of the Black Sabbath (1977, translated by Carol Dunlop-Hébert)
- Carol Dunlop, La solitude inachevée (1976), ISBN 0777701693 ISBN 9780777701690
- Mélanie dans le miroir : roman by Carol Dunlop (1980), ISBN 2714412777 ISBN 9782714412775.
- Julio Cortázar, Carol Dunlop, Los autonautas de la cosmopista, (The Autonauts of the Cosmoroute) (1983).
- Deaf to the city by Marie-Claire Blais (2006), translated by Carol Dunlop, ISBN 155096013X ISBN 9781550960136
- Julio Cortázar, Carol Dunlop, Silvia Monrós-Stojaković, Correspondencia (2009), Alpha Decay, Barcelona.
- Carol Dunlop, Julio Cortázar, The Autonauts of the Cosmoroute, Archipelago Books (2007), ISBN 9780979333002 ISBN 0979333008
