= Lake County Courthouse =

Lake County Courthouse may refer to:

- Old Lake County Courthouse (California), Lakeport, California
- Old Lake County Courthouse (Florida), Tavares, Florida
- Lake County Courthouse (Indiana), Crown Point, Indiana
- Lake County Courthouse and Sheriff's Residence, Two Harbors, Minnesota
- Lake County Courthouse (Ohio), Painesville, Ohio
  - Painesville City Hall, also known as the Old Lake County Courthouse, Ohio
- Lake County Courthouse (South Dakota), Madison, South Dakota
