= Painesville station =

Former railroad station in Painesville, Ohio, United States

Painesville
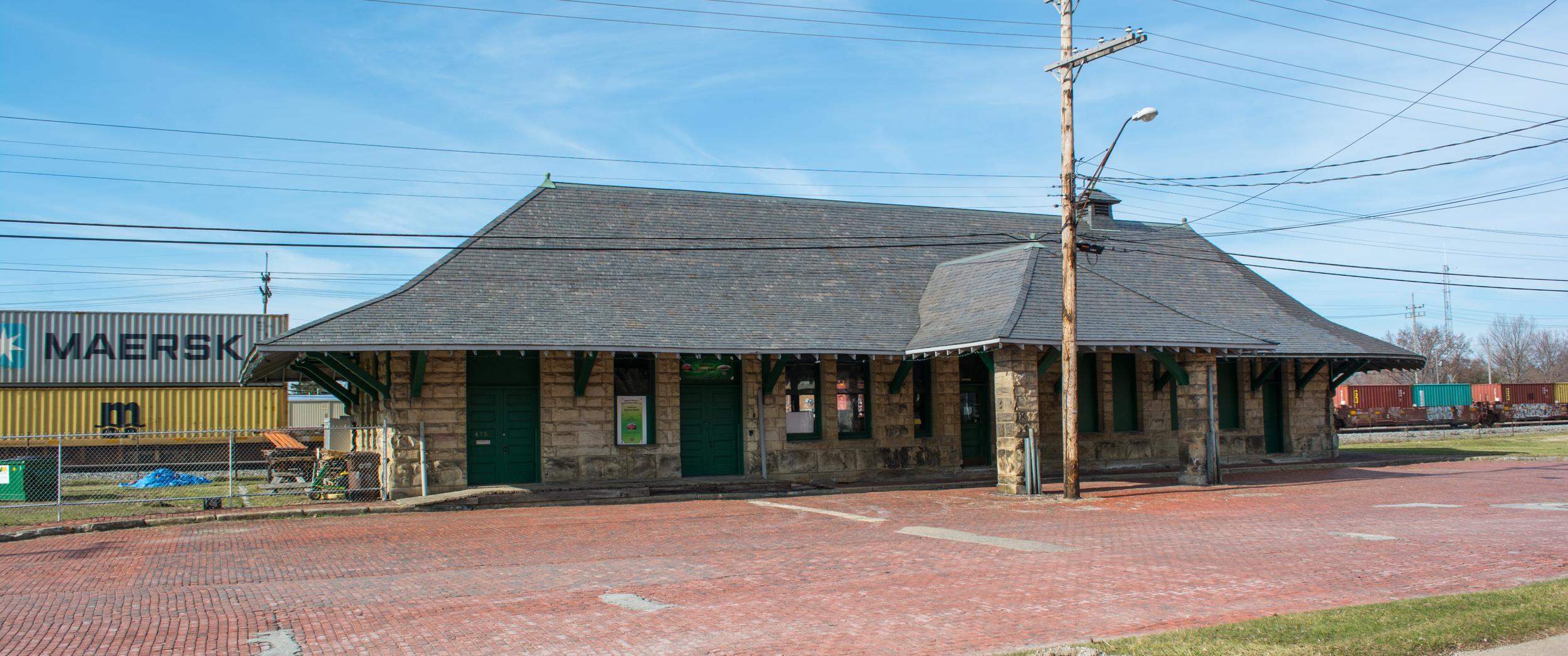
- Painesville station in 2018

General information
- Location: 475 Railroad Street; Painesville, Ohio; United States
- Coordinates: 41°44′00.2″N 81°14′37.0″W
- Owner: Western Reserve Railroad Association
- Line: CSX Erie West Subdivision
- Tracks: 2

Construction
- Structure type: At-grade
- Architect: Shepley, Rutan and Coolidge
- Architectural style: Richardsonian Romanesque

Other information
- Website: www.painesvillerailroadmuseum.org

History
- Opened: February 2, 1893
- Closed: May 1, 1971
- Original company: Lake Shore and Michigan Southern

Former services
Preceding station	New York Central Railroad	Following station
Heisley toward Chicago	Main Line	Lane toward New York
Location

Painesville station is a former train station in the city of Painesville in Lake County, Ohio. The station was completed in 1893 for the Lake Shore and Michigan Southern Railway to replace an older depot built by the predecessor to the Lake Shore, the Cleveland, Painesville and Ashtabula Railroad. After merging with the Lake Shore in 1914, the New York Central Railroad operated passenger rail service from the Painesville station until 1968, when it was succeeded by the Penn Central. Rail service ceased altogether in 1971 when Amtrak took over intercity passenger rail in the U.S. The station was transferred in 1997 to the Western Reserve Railroad Association, which reopened the station in 2017 as the Painesville Railroad Museum.

== Design ==
The Painesville station is located on Railroad Street in Painesville, Ohio; when the current station was opened, the street was then known as Depot Street. It is adjacent to the Erie West Subdivision rail line owned by CSX Transportation.

The station building was designed in the Richardsonian Romanesque style by the architectural firm Shepley, Rutan and Coolidge. The firm was a prolific designer of railroad stations in the U.S.—23 stations on the Boston and Albany Railroad alone—and was originally founded as the continuation of designs by Henry Hobson Richardson, of which the style was named. The design of the Painesville station is typical railroad station buildings of the period with its "broad and low" silhouette and a "wide overhanging roof".

== History ==
=== Cleveland, Painesville and Ashtabula Railroad ===
The Ohio General Assembly incorporated the Cleveland, Painesville and Ashtabula Railroad (CP&A) on February 18, 1848 to facilitate the connection of Cleveland by rail to the east, by way of Painesville and Ashtabula, towards Erie, Pennsylvania and Buffalo, New York. Potential routes from Cleveland to the Pennsylvania border were surveyed in 1849 with the chosen route passing 2/3 mile (1.1 km) north of Painesville. Thirteen stations were planned along the route with a station in Painesville estimated to cost $4,500 to build. The laying of the 30 miles (48 km) of track from Cleveland was completed by November 20, 1851 with regular train service from Painesville commencing. The newly constructed station building in Painesville was considered "a model one, combining convenience, neatness and good taste". On February 16, 1861, the president-elect Abraham Lincoln gave a short speech on the station platform while traveling from Illinois to his inauguration in Washington, D.C. After his assassination, Painesville residents turned out in the early morning on April 28, 1865 to view Lincoln's funeral train as it passed through the station transporting his casket back to Illinois for burial.

=== Lake Shore and Michigan Southern Railway ===
In 1867, the CP&A was extended to Toledo by leasing the Cleveland and Toledo Railroad. As it now owned or controlled rail lines extending nearly the entire length of the southern shoreline of Lake Erie—from Erie, Pennsylvania to Toledo—the railroad was renamed the Lake Shore Railway on June 17, 1868. It then merged with the Michigan Southern and Northern Indiana Railroad on April 6, 1869 to form the Lake Shore and Michigan Southern Railway (LS&MS).

Construction on a station to replace the original was begun by the LS&MS in July 1892, when the foundations were laid. The completed station was opened to public on February 2, 1893. Despite being equipped "with the most modern appliances and conveniences", the municipal sewer and electric utilities had yet to be laid from town to the station building rendering both its restrooms and electric lighting inoperative.

=== New York Central Railroad ===
By the early 1900s, the LS&MS and other railroads in the Midwest were becoming increasingly under the control of William K. Vanderbilt and his New York Central Railroad through ownership interests in the various railroad companies. The increase in ownership would allow for increased integration of the constituent railroads with the operations of the New York Central. The LS&MS was then fully absorbed by the New York Central on December 22, 1914.

The New York Central was merged with the Pennsylvania Railroad on February 1, 1968 to form the Penn Central Transportation Company. By then, service from Painesville was reduced to two, scheduled eastbound trains towards Buffalo. Westbound trains to Cleveland and Chicago consisted of a single flag stop, except on Sundays, which had an additional scheduled stop in the evening. The Sunday service was a holdover from when students from the nearby Lake Erie College would travel on weekends. Travel to downtown Cleveland would take the train 75 minutes where, at the time, a Greyhound bus from Painesville would take 80 minutes when using Euclid Avenue, but only 40 minutes on Interstate 90. The last passenger train from Painesville departed in the early morning on May 1, 1971; that day the newly created National Passenger Rail Corporation, more commonly known as Amtrak, took over nationwide passenger rail operations.

=== Bus station ===
In the early 1970s, Greyhound Bus Lines moved its Painesville stop from in front of a newsstand at 50 North State Street to the now-disused train station. Greyhound operated intercity service from Painesville west to Cleveland, and east to Buffalo or Jamestown, New York with intermediate stops in Ashtabula; Erie, Pennsylvania, and Dunkirk, New York. Commuter service between Cleveland, Wickliffe and Painesville was operated by Lakefront Lines.

=== Railroad museum ===
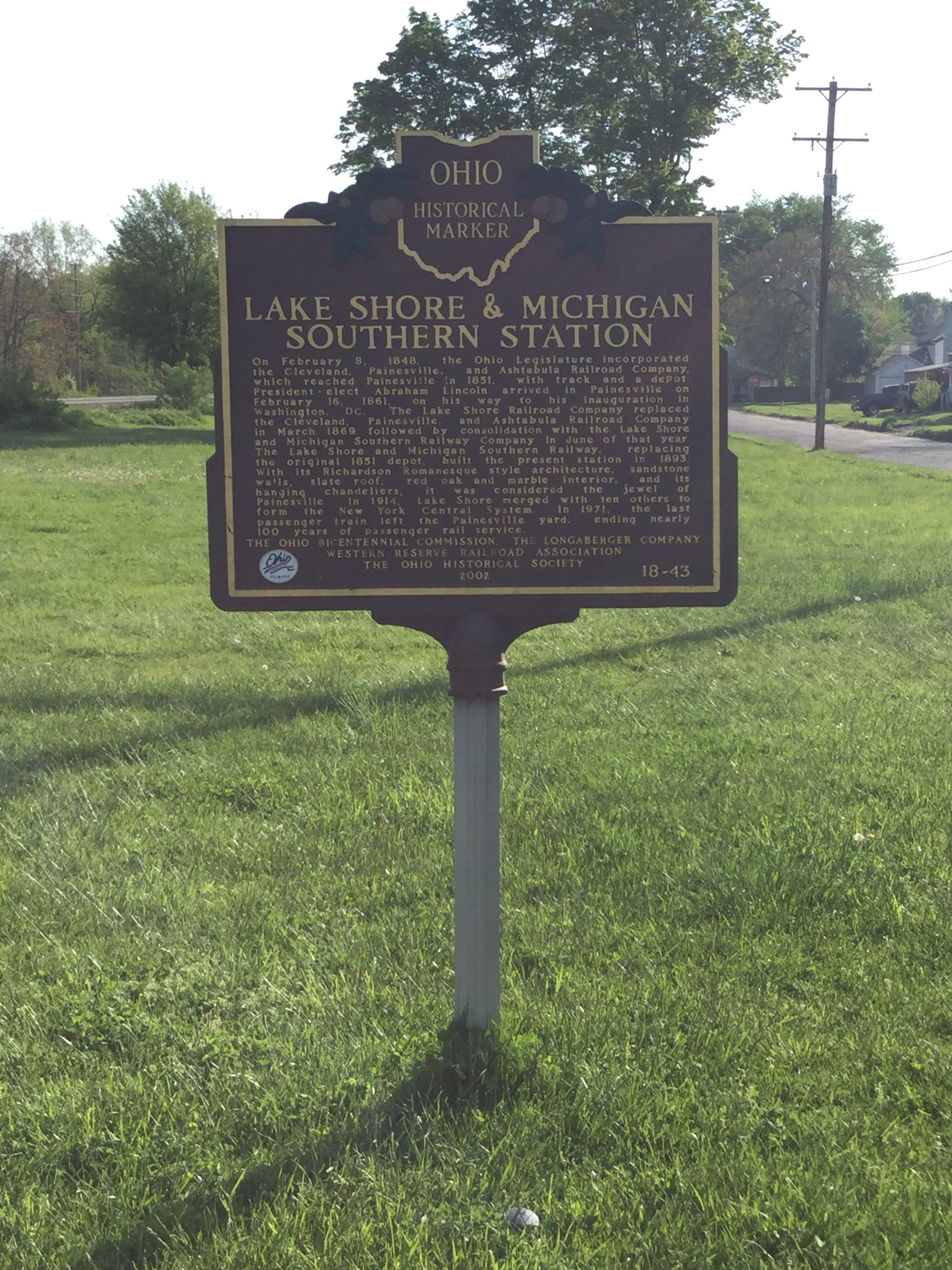
Painesville LS&MS station sign

The disused station building was sold in September 1993 was purchased from Conrail by a Pittsburgh, Pennsylvania-based developer that had developed other properties in Painesville and northeast Ohio. The interior of the building was emptied and stripped down to the exterior walls; railroad memorabilia and other antiques such as the stationmaster's chair dating to the mid-1800s as well as a set of rare electrical insulators were preserved by the developer. Two years later the developer reconsidered the project to develop the station into retail shops and a restaurant. Instead, he sought to have the property transferred to a nonprofit organization to preserve and operate the station as a railroad museum. The Western Reserve Railroad Association was formed in mid-1997 and, by August 30, 1997, began to the process of renovating and restoring the station from years of neglect. The organization took ownership of the station building and property on November 12, 1997, as well as receiving a $50,000 grant from the developer and an additional $155,000 grant from Lake County.

For one day, the Painesville station saw a return of passenger train service on November 13, 1997. As part of a demonstration sponsored by Laketran and the Greater Cleveland Regional Transit Authority, locomotives from Amtrak and bilevel cars from Caltrain operated as a mock-commuter service from Cleveland Lakefront Station to Painesville and Madison. The demonstration operated the previous day from downtown Cleveland to Lorain.

The museum received a former Baltimore and Ohio Railroad caboose donated by Lubrizol in June 2000; it was severely damaged by arson on March 19, 2006.

After an intensive three-year renovation of the interior, the station was opened to the public as a railroad museum in May 2017 with a ribbon-cutting ceremony on May 12.

== Timeline ==
- 1988 – Conrail used the depot for storing signals and equipment.
- 2002 – Ohio Historical Maker awarded.
- 2015 – City of Painesville makes Railroad Street and Depot a Historic District.

== See also ==
- List of railway museums

== Sources ==
- Harbach, Frederick (1850). Report on the preliminary surveys for the Cleveland, Painesville and Ashtabula Rail Road [sic] Company. Cleveland, Ohio: Sanford & Hayward.
- Ochsner, Jeffrey Karl (June 1988). "Architecture for the Boston & Albany Railroad: 1881–1894". Journal of the Society of Architectural Historians. 47 (2): 109–131. doi:10.2307/990324. JSTOR 990324.
- Ohio Commissioner of Railroads and Telegraphs (1874). Annual Report of the Commissioner of Railroads and Telegraphs. Vol. 7. Columbus, Ohio: Nevins & Myers.
- Russell's Official National Motor Coach Guide. Vol. 57. Cedar Rapids, Iowa: Russell's Guides. January 1985. ISSN 0036-0171.
