= Henry Cowles =

Henry Cowles is the name of:

- Henry B. Cowles (1798–1873), U.S. Representative from New York
- Henry Cowles (theologian) (1803–1881), American theological scholar
- Henry Chandler Cowles (1869–1939), American botanist and ecological pioneer

== See also ==
- Henry Cowell (disambiguation)
