= Difficult Women =

Difficult Women may refer to:

- Difficult Women (cabaret), a literary-folk music cabaret created in 1992 in Melbourne
- Difficult Women (book), a 2017 short story collection by Roxane Gay

== See also ==
- Difficult Woman, an album by Renée Geyer
