= Casement =

Casement may refer to:

- Casement (surname), a surname (including a list of people with the name)
- Casement Aerodrome, a military airfield near Dublin, Ireland
- Casement Park, the principal Gaelic Athletic Association stadium in Belfast, Northern Ireland
- Casement window, a window that is attached to the window frame with hinges at the side

== See also ==
- Casemate, sometimes erroneously rendered "casement"
