= Edward Paine =

Namesake of Painesville, Ohio

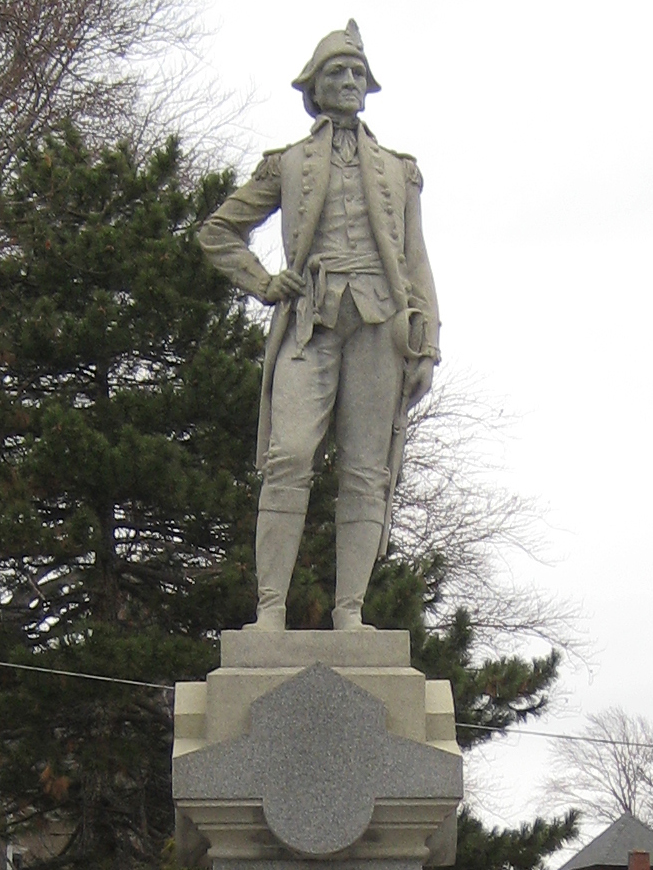

Edward Paine (January 27, 1746 – August 28, 1841) was an officer in the Continental Army during the Revolutionary War and helped establish Lake County, Ohio. A founder of Painesville, Ohio, it is named for him and has a statue of him. He became a brigadier general after his service in the New York Militia. He was a Whig.

He was born in Bolton , Connecticut. He joined the Connecticut Militia after the Revolutionary war.

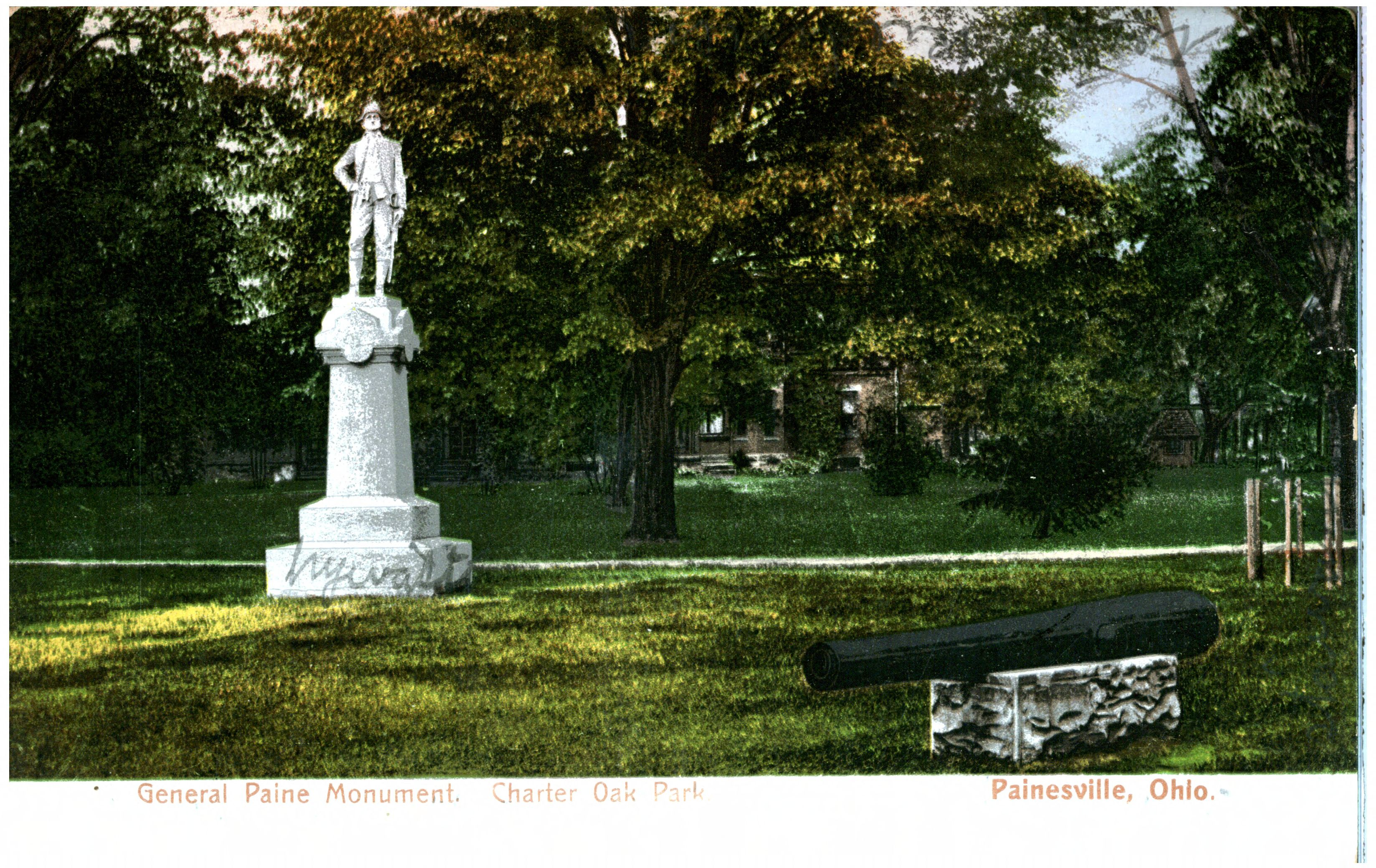
Rochester News Company postcard of the General Paine Monument at Charter Oak Park on Painesville, Ohio

He also served in the New York Militia and lived in Aurora, New York, and served in the state legislature before taking part in an expedition to Ohio. He proceeded on the journey with his eldest son Edward Paine Jr in the fall of 1796. After they located a site he returned to Aurora. His son stayed until the following spring. They secured title to the Ohio Territory lands and gathered a group to settle the area and departed on March 5, 1800. He was elected twice to serve in the Territorial Legislature of Ohio.

He died in Painesville.
