= WHWN =

Radio station in Painesville, Ohio

- Painesville, Ohio; United States
- Broadcast area: Painesville, Ohio; Greater Cleveland (limited)
- Frequency: 88.3 MHz
- Branding: La Nueva Mia

Programming
- Language: Spanish
- Format: Regional Mexican

Ownership
- Owner: Nelson Cintron, Jr.; (La Cadena Mundial Hispana, Inc.)

History
- First air date: March 11, 1997
- Call sign meaning: Hispanic World Network

Technical information
- Licensing authority: FCC
- Facility ID: 85786
- Class: A
- ERP: 700 watts
- HAAT: 44 meters (144 ft)
- Transmitter coordinates: 41°42′17″N 81°14′34″W

Links
- Public license information: Public file; LMS

WHWN (88.3 FM) is a non-commercial educational radio station licensed to Painesville, Ohio, United States. Owned by Nelson Cintron Jr. via La Cadena Mundial Hispana, Inc. (Hispanic World Network), the station broadcasts a Regional Mexican format and serves Lake County and eastern parts of Greater Cleveland. WHWN's studios and transmitter is located in Painesville Township.
