= Painesville, Ohio =

- City
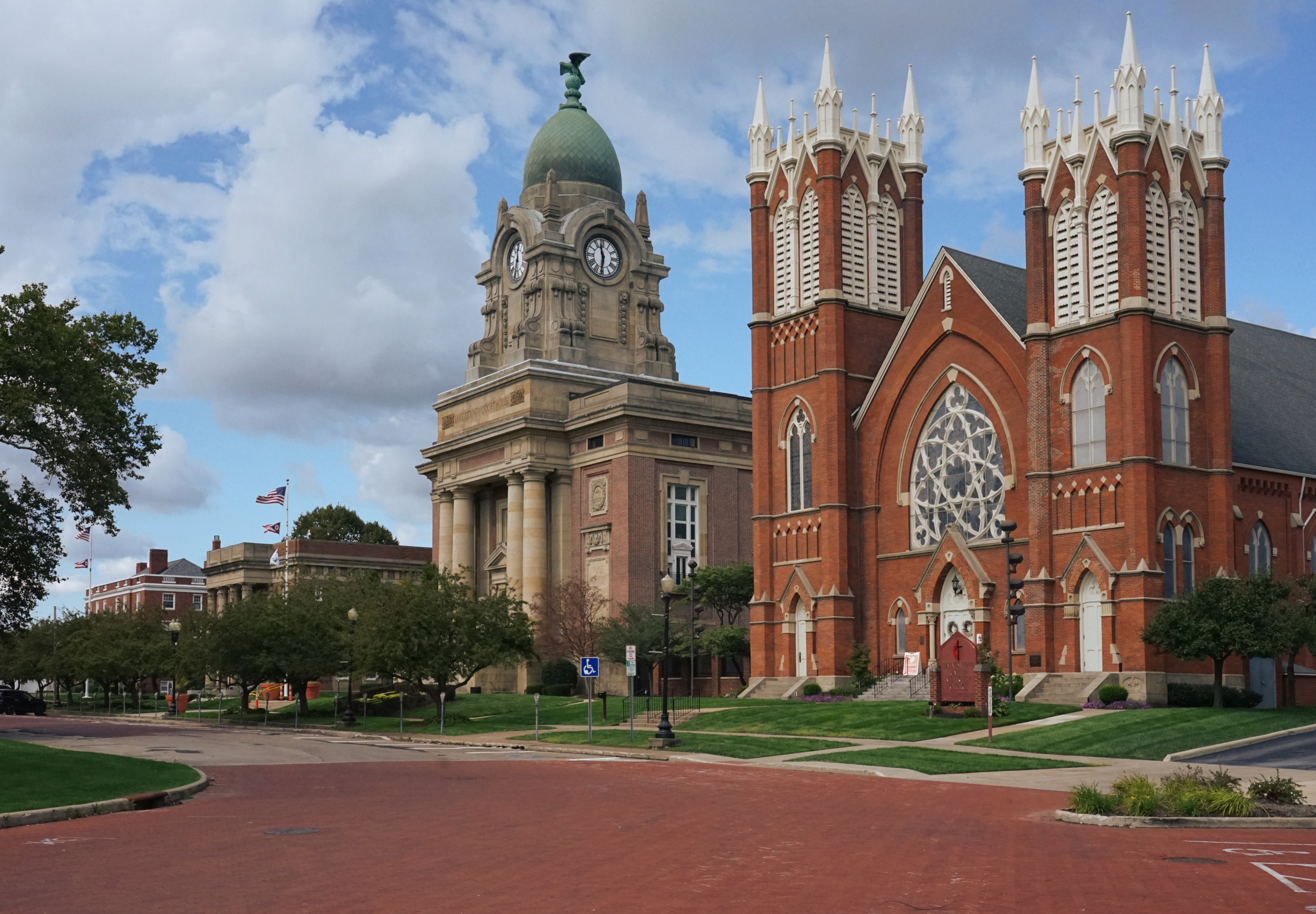
- Downtown Painesville Historic District

- Flag Seal
- Interactive map of Painesville, Ohio
- Location within Ohio Location within the United States
- Coordinates: 41°44′22″N 81°14′59″W
- Country: United States
- State: Ohio
- County: Lake
- Settled: 1800

Government
  - Type: Council–manager government

Area
  - Total: 7.01 sq mi (18.15 km^{2})
  - Land: 6.83 sq mi (17.68 km^{2})
  - Water: 0.18 sq mi (0.47 km^{2})
- Elevation: 643 ft (196 m)

Population (2020)
  - Total: 20,312
  - Density: 2,975.9/sq mi (1,149.02/km^{2})
- Time zone: UTC-5 (Eastern (EST))
  - Summer (DST): UTC-4 (EDT)
- ZIP code: 44077
- Area code: 440
- FIPS code: 39-59416
- GNIS feature ID: 1086428
- Website: www.painesville.com

Painesville is a city in Lake County, Ohio, United States, and its county seat. Located along the Grand River, it is a northeast suburb of Cleveland. Its population was 20,312 at the 2020 census. Painesville is included in the Greater Cleveland metropolitan area.

== History ==
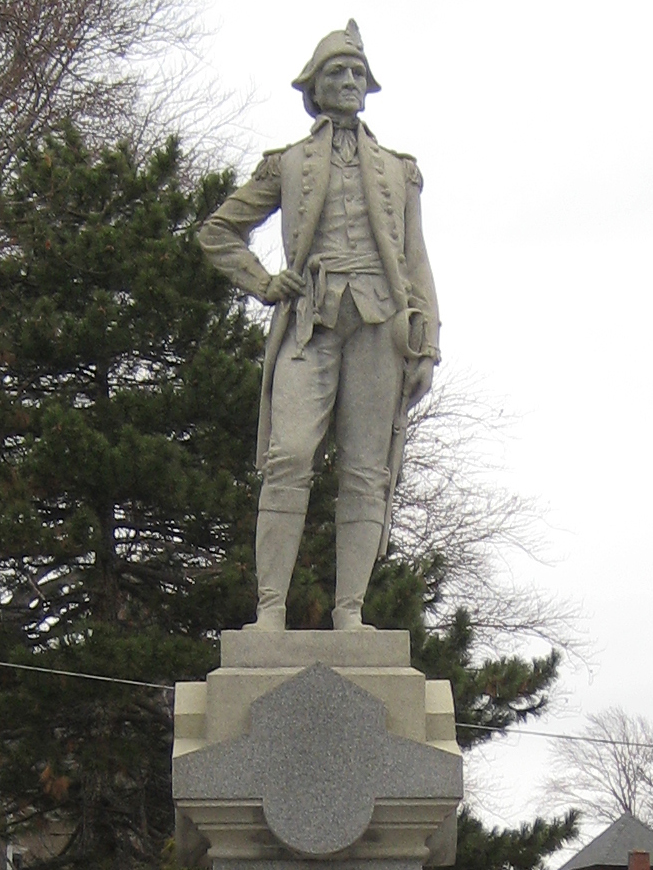
Statue of General Edward Paine, the city's namesake

Painesville is included in what is historically referred to as the Connecticut Western Reserve. General Edward Paine (1746–1841), a native of Bolton, Connecticut, who had served as a captain in the Connecticut militia during the war, and John Walworth arrived in 1800 with a party of sixty-six settlers, among the first in the Western Reserve. General Paine later represented the region in the territorial legislature of the Northwest Territory.

In 1800 the Western Reserve became Trumbull County, Ohio, and at the first Court of Quarter Sessions, the county was divided into eight townships. The smallest of these townships was named Painesville, for General Paine, and encompassed what later became the townships of Perry, Leroy, Hambden, Concord, Chardon, Mentor, and Kirtland. The township government was organized in 1802. The post office in Painesville was opened in 1803 with John Walworth as postmaster.

In what was to become the commercial center of the township was a settlement called Oak Openings, its name being descriptive of the scrub oaks and sandy soil. It was here in 1805 that Gen. Henry Champion laid out a village plat and called it Champion, a name that it carried only until incorporation in 1832 when the name "Painesville" was chosen in honor of General Paine. Two of his descendants, Eleazer A. Paine and Halbert E. Paine, later served as Union Army generals during the American Civil War.

In 1840, Lake County was created from portions of Geauga County and Cuyahoga County, and Painesville was made the county seat. In 1852, the community of Painesville became a village, and in 1902 the village attained city status.

=== Underground Railroad ===
Rider's Inn opened on June 16, 1812, on what is now US Route 20 to serve weary travelers passing through Painesville. But later in the 19th century it served a greater purpose – as a stop on the Underground Railroad. The freedom seekers would come to a dry well located behind the inn. There, they would find a ladder leading down to a door to the inn's basement. Fugitive slaves were able to rest and recharge before making their way across Lake Erie into Canada. Over the years, historians estimate that 3,000 former slaves came through Rider's Inn. The inn served as a meeting spot for the anti-slavery committee in town, and documents have been found detailing their abolitionist movement. After over two hundred years, Riders inn became a bed and breakfast locally owned by two business women. During this ownership the underground tunnel used to hide slaves had caved in and couldn't be entered again. In 2025 Riders Inn closed and remains unoccupied. Historical photographs, memorabilia and documents such as the anti-slavery Bugle are currently on display in the main lobby and can be visible by looking in windows.

== Geography ==
According to the United States Census Bureau, the city has a total area of 7.01 square miles (18.15 km^{2}), of which 6.83 square miles (17.68 km^{2}) are land and 0.18 square miles (0.47 km^{2}), or 2.59%, is water.

Painesville and Concord townships, along with the village of Fairport Harbor and the city of Mentor, are adjacent to Painesville.

=== Climate ===
Painesville has a hybrid between a humid subtropical and humid continental climate (Köppen Cfa/Dfa). In spite of the mild winter days, lake-effect snow usually brings a lot of accumulation in winter. Summers have warm days and quite muggy nights. Precipitation is high year-round.

Climate data for Painesville, Ohio (1991–2020 normals), extremes since 1950
Month	Jan	Feb	Mar	Apr	May	Jun	Jul	Aug	Sep	Oct	Nov	Dec	Year
Record high °F (°C)	70 (21)	77 (25)	82 (28)	91 (33)	93 (34)	98 (37)	96 (36)	96 (36)	96 (36)	91 (33)	81 (27)	75 (24)	98 (37)
Mean maximum °F (°C)	58.9 (14.9)	59.7 (15.4)	70.0 (21.1)	79.8 (26.6)	84.6 (29.2)	89.7 (32.1)	90.2 (32.3)	89.8 (32.1)	87.2 (30.7)	80.0 (26.7)	69.0 (20.6)	60.3 (15.7)	92.5 (33.6)
Mean daily maximum °F (°C)	36.8 (2.7)	38.7 (3.7)	46.1 (7.8)	58.1 (14.5)	69.1 (20.6)	78.1 (25.6)	82.3 (27.9)	81.6 (27.6)	76.2 (24.6)	64.9 (18.3)	52.6 (11.4)	42.0 (5.6)	60.5 (15.8)
Daily mean °F (°C)	30.2 (−1.0)	31.4 (−0.3)	38.2 (3.4)	49.2 (9.6)	60.3 (15.7)	69.8 (21.0)	74.6 (23.7)	73.7 (23.2)	67.8 (19.9)	57.0 (13.9)	45.7 (7.6)	36.2 (2.3)	52.8 (11.6)
Mean daily minimum °F (°C)	23.7 (−4.6)	24.1 (−4.4)	30.2 (−1.0)	40.4 (4.7)	51.4 (10.8)	61.5 (16.4)	66.9 (19.4)	65.7 (18.7)	59.4 (15.2)	49.1 (9.5)	38.8 (3.8)	30.3 (−0.9)	45.1 (7.3)
Mean minimum °F (°C)	5.4 (−14.8)	7.6 (−13.6)	14.2 (−9.9)	27.4 (−2.6)	37.8 (3.2)	48.0 (8.9)	55.3 (12.9)	53.9 (12.2)	45.3 (7.4)	35.6 (2.0)	25.1 (−3.8)	14.4 (−9.8)	2.7 (−16.3)
Record low °F (°C)	−19 (−28)	−9 (−23)	0 (−18)	17 (−8)	25 (−4)	37 (3)	43 (6)	39 (4)	27 (−3)	24 (−4)	5 (−15)	−11 (−24)	−19 (−28)
Average precipitation inches (mm)	3.14 (80)	2.15 (55)	2.83 (72)	3.47 (88)	3.42 (87)	3.63 (92)	4.12 (105)	3.44 (87)	3.91 (99)	4.04 (103)	3.17 (81)	3.14 (80)	40.46 (1,029)
Average precipitation days (≥ 0.01 in)	15.7	12.5	12.6	13.2	12.6	11.4	9.6	9.6	9.1	13.1	13.5	14.1	147.0
Source 1: NOAA
Source 2: National Weather Service

== Demographics ==
Historical population
Census	Pop.	Note	%±
1820	257		—
1830	499		94.2%
1840	1,014		103.2%
1860	2,649		—
1870	3,728		40.7%
1880	3,841		3.0%
1890	4,755		23.8%
1900	5,024		5.7%
1910	5,501		9.5%
1920	7,272		32.2%
1930	10,944		50.5%
1940	12,235		11.8%
1950	14,432		18.0%
1960	16,116		11.7%
1970	16,536		2.6%
1980	16,351		−1.1%
1990	15,699		−4.0%
2000	17,503		11.5%
2010	19,563		11.8%
2020	20,312		3.8%
2025 (est.)	20,660		1.7%

Painesville's Hispanic population increased elevenfold between 1990 and 2010. New residents were primarily immigrants from León, Guanajuato, the fourth-largest city in Mexico. They had settled in Painesville after finding work in its plant nurseries.

=== 2020 census ===
As of the 2020 census, Painesville had a population of 20,312. The median age was 33.4 years. 26.5% of residents were under the age of 18 and 11.8% were 65 years of age or older. For every 100 females there were 99.1 males, and for every 100 females age 18 and over there were 97.1 males age 18 and over.

99.8% of residents lived in urban areas, while 0.2% lived in rural areas.

There were 7,737 households in Painesville, of which 34.0% had children under the age of 18 living in them. Of all households, 35.1% were married-couple households, 24.0% were households with a male householder and no spouse or partner present, and 32.5% were households with a female householder and no spouse or partner present. About 32.8% of all households were made up of individuals and 10.6% had someone living alone who was 65 years of age or older.

There were 8,359 housing units, of which 7.4% were vacant. The homeowner vacancy rate was 1.4% and the rental vacancy rate was 8.6%.

Painesville led the state of Ohio in the percentage of people speaking Spanish at home, with 20.2%.

Educational attainment for residents 25 and older is the following: High School Diploma 84%, Bachelor's degree or higher 20.7%. The median household income is $51,373 and the per capita income for a family of three is $79,086.

Racial composition as of the 2020 census
Race	Number	Percent
White	11,613	57.2%
Black or African American	2,643	13.0%
American Indian and Alaska Native	222	1.1%
Asian	237	1.2%
Native Hawaiian and Other Pacific Islander	5	0.0%
Some other race	3,395	16.7%
Two or more races	2,197	10.8%
Hispanic or Latino (of any race)	5,440	26.8%

=== 2010 census ===
As of the census of 2010, there were 19,563 people, 7,095 households, and 4,381 families living in the city. The population density was 3,110.2 inhabitants per square mile (1,200.9/km^{2}). There were 7,867 housing units at an average density of 1,250.7 per square mile (482.9/km^{2}). The racial makeup of the city was 68.2% White, 13.1% African American, 0.3% Native American, 0.8% Asian, 13.2% from other races, and 4.5% from two or more races. Hispanic or Latino of any race were 22.0% of the population.

There were 7,095 households, of which 37.2% had children under the age of 18 living with them, 37.8% were married couples living together, 18.4% had a female householder with no husband present, 5.5% had a male householder with no wife present, and 38.3% were non-families. 29.9% of all households were made up of individuals, and 8.2% had someone living alone who was 65 years of age or older. The average household size was 2.64 and the average family size was 3.33.

The median age in the city was 30.2 years. 28.3% of residents were under the age of 18; 12.6% were between the ages of 18 and 24; 29.9% were from 25 to 44; 20.5% were from 45 to 64; and 8.7% were 65 years of age or older. The gender makeup of the city was 50.3% male and 49.7% female.

== Economy ==
The largest employers are the city government, county government, and the public school systems. Other notable employers in the area include Avery Dennison, Mar-Bal Corp., Lubrizol, AeroControlex, Guyer Precision, Eckart America, Ranpak and Meritec.

== Government ==
Painesville has a council–manager system of government. The city council consists of seven members who are elected for four-year terms. Three members are elected by the city at large, and four members are elected from wards. Painesville City Hall was built in 1852 and is listed on the National Register of Historic Places.

== Education ==
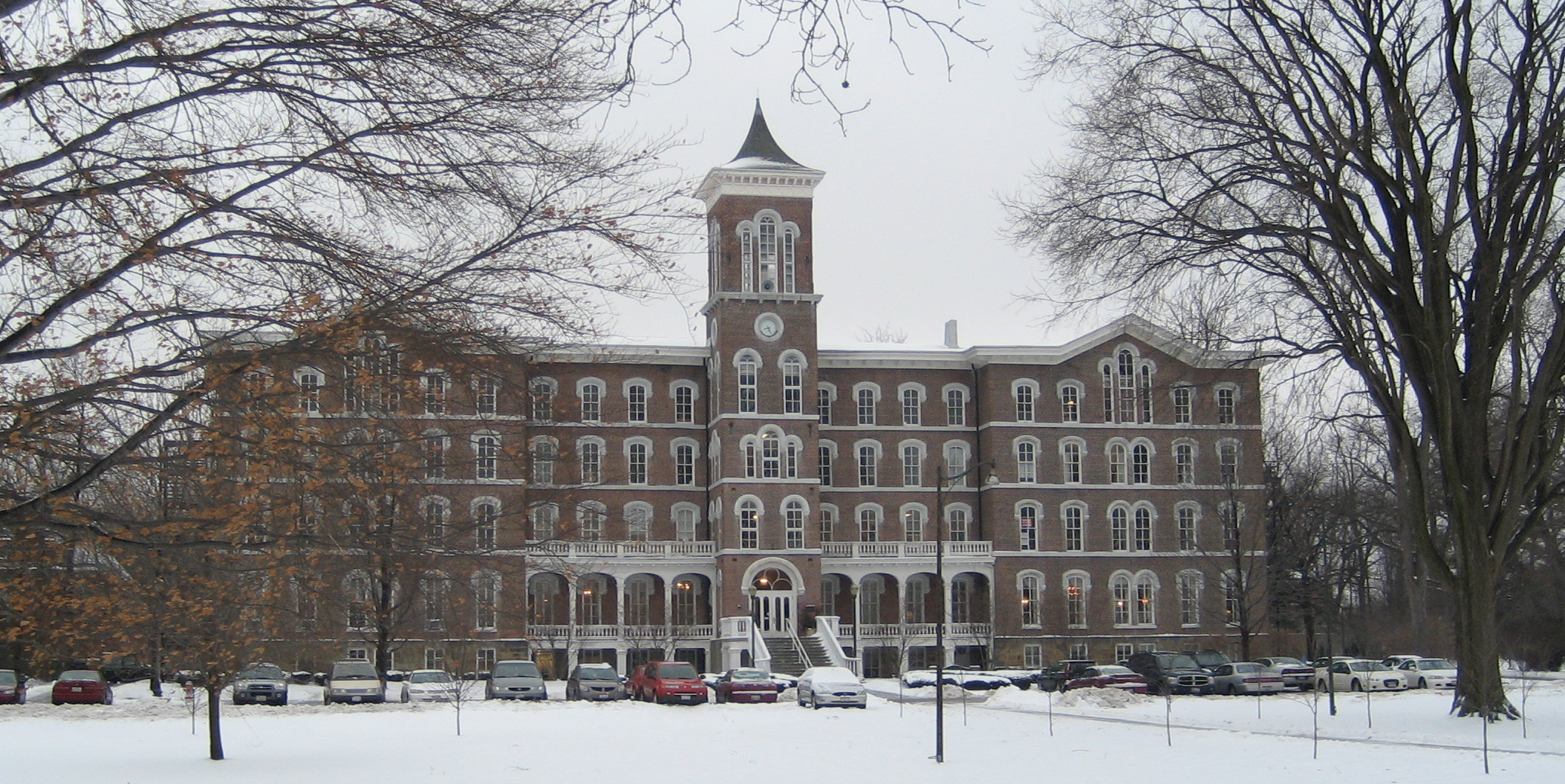
Administration Building, Lake Erie College

Public education in the vast majority of Painesville is provided by the Painesville City Schools, which includes Red Raider Preschool; Chestnut Elementary School, Elm Street Elementary School, and Maple Elementary School (all grades K–5); Heritage Middle School (grades 6–8) and Thomas W. Harvey High School (grades 9–12). A small piece of the city limits is in the Riverside Local School District.

Painesville is the home of Lake Erie College, a private liberal arts college enrolling approximately 1,200 students. The college offers over 60 undergraduate programs and master's programs. The former Andrews Osborne Academy's Painesville campus became part of Lake Erie College in 2008.

Morley Library, serving both Painesville City and Painesville Township, is located within Painesville's 284-acre (115 ha) Historic Downtown District.

== Media ==
- WHWN (88.3 FM) Regional Mexican
- WCCD (1460 AM) Urban contemporary gospel

== Transportation ==
Major transportation routes in the city are U.S. Route 20 and Ohio State Route 2, Ohio State Route 84 and Ohio State Route 44. Painesville is located just north of Interstate 90 and is easily accessed via Route 44. Laketran operates bus lines throughout Lake County as well as into downtown Cleveland and Cleveland's major medical centers in University Circle.

Two major freight railroads, CSX and Norfolk Southern, pass through the city and serve some of the city's industries. There is no passenger rail service in the city, although Painesville station was formerly served from 1893 to 1971 by various railroads, most prominently the New York Central Railroad.

== Healthcare ==
The Painesville City and Painesville Township healthcare needs are provided in neighboring Concord Township by University Hospitals Cleveland Medical Center and Tri-Point Medical Center. The hospital is part of the Lake Health healthcare system.

== In popular culture ==
The area in and around Painesville was used as the location for the filming of the 1964 feature film One Potato, Two Potato. The film, which was selected at that year's Cannes Film Festival, provides a glimpse of the era in the city's downtown, featuring its central park and surrounding architecture. The Lake County Courthouse and Painesville City Hall remain today. The historic Parmly Hotel, which is seen in the opening credits and occasionally throughout the film, has since been replaced by a shopping plaza and office complex.

== Notable people ==
=== Artist, composer, music, author, poet, writer ===
- Robert H. Abel - Writer
- Minerva Dayton Bateham - Poet, hymnwriter
- William Holbrook Beard - Painter
- Jason L Blair - Writer
- Paisley Dodds - News writer and editor
- Joe Dolce - Singer-songwriter and poet
- Harlan Ellison - Author
- TR Ericsson - Artist
- Eber D. Howe - Author and Newspaperman
- William Langson Lathrop - Artist
- Vernita Nemec - Artist
- Pat Torpey - Drummer

=== Business ===
- Frank Burrelle - Company founder, media
- John C. Lincoln - Inventor and Entrepreneur
- Eschines P. Matthews - Businessman

=== Cinema, radio, television, and theater ===
- Emma Sheridan Fry - Actor, playwright
- Shell Kepler - Actor
- James Wakefield - Vaudeville Performer

=== Education ===
- Vivian Blanche Small, president, Lake Erie College

=== Government ===
- Edward P. Branch - Mayor
- William Wellington Corlett - Territorial Delegate
- Ruth Dwyer (politician)
- Lindsey Horvath - Member of the Los Angeles County Board of Supervisors
- Eschines P. Matthews - Wisconsin State Assemblyman
- Robert Maynard Murray - US Congressman
- David R. Paige - US Congressman
- Byron Paine - Wisconsin Supreme Court justice
- Arlington G. Reynolds - Speaker of the Ohio House of Representatives
- Charles W. Stage - Ohio state representative, baseball umpire
- J. William Stanton - US Congressman
- James Wakefield - US Congressman

=== Medical ===
- George Trumbull Ladd - Psychologist

=== Military ===
- John S. Casement - Civil War general
- Marge Hurlburt - Pilot
- Robert William Strong Sr. - US Brigadier General
- Howell B. Treat - Medal of Honor Recipient

=== Organizations ===
- Daniel Carter Beard - Boy Scouts of America co-founder

=== Religion ===
- Bruce Edward Caldwell - Bishop
- Paul John Hallinan - Bishop
- John Henry House - Missionary
- Edward Partridge - Bishop

=== Social Reform ===
- Josephine Penfield Cushman Bateham - Social reformer, editor, writer
- Frances Jennings Casement - Suffragette

=== Sports ===
- Ed Andrews - Baseball player
- James Bond (American football)
- Tony DeCarlo - College coach
- Larry Foust - NBA player
- Joe Galat - College coach
- Wallace Gordon - Baseball player
- Marvin Hawley - Baseball player
- Morgan Lewis (basketball)
- Joe Loth - College coach
- Danny Nardico - Boxer
- Tom Orosz - NFL player
- Steve Ortmayer - NFL player
- David Posey - NFL player
- Tom Rossley - Football coach
- Paul Ryczek - NFL player
- Scott Shafer - Football coach
- Jason Short - NFL player
- Don Shula - NFL player, coach
- Charles W. Stage - Professional umpire
- Whitey Wistert - College Hall of Fame Football player
