= Henry Cowell (disambiguation) =

Henry Cowell may refer to:

- Henry Cowell, an American classical music composer and pianist
- Henry Cowell Redwoods State Park, a California State Park named for a local industrialist

== See also ==
- Henry Cowles (disambiguation)
