= Paisley Dodds =

Paisley Dodds is the former investigations editor for The New Humanitarian. She spent the bulk of her career at The Associated Press, where she was AP's London bureau chief and spent a decade managing the news bureau, as well as writing about terrorism, security, and intelligence before joining the AP's international investigations team. She is currently a fellow at the Ira A. Lipman Center for Journalism and Civil and Human Rights at Columbia's School of Journalism.

== Life and career ==
Dodds is a native of Painesville, Ohio. Dodds attended John Carroll University (University Heights, Ohio) in 1991, where she received a B.A. degree in Communications in 1993. In 2016 she obtained an M.St. degree in International Relations from the University of Cambridge.

She joined the AP in 1994 to cover the South African elections that brought Nelson Mandela to power. After nearly three years covering post-Apartheid South Africa, she worked for the AP in Miami, Little Rock and Boston before joining the international desk in New York.

In 2001, she was promoted to Caribbean News Editor in San Juan, Puerto Rico. From 2001 to 2005, she directed coverage from 30 countries in the Caribbean and Latin America. Her primary and most frequent reporting assignments included Haiti and Guantanamo Bay; she broke several investigative pieces about abuse in the U.S. prison camp.

In 2005, she was named London Bureau Chief, a role she held until late 2016 when she was named a London-based correspondent with security and intelligence matters as her beat. She has reported from many corners of the world.

== Awards ==
She is the recipient of the George Polk award for her foreign reporting in Haiti that covered numerous disasters, conflict and the rebellion that ousted President Jean-Bertrand Aristide.

She also won the Joseph L. Brechner Freedom of Information Award for her work in Guantanamo, the Enterprise Reporting Award from the AP Managing Editors Association, an honourable mention from the Overseas Press Club of America and the Hugh Hefner First Amendment Award for her investigative reporting at the U.S. prison camp in Guantanamo.
