= Joe Dolce =

American-Australian singer-songwriter (born 1947)

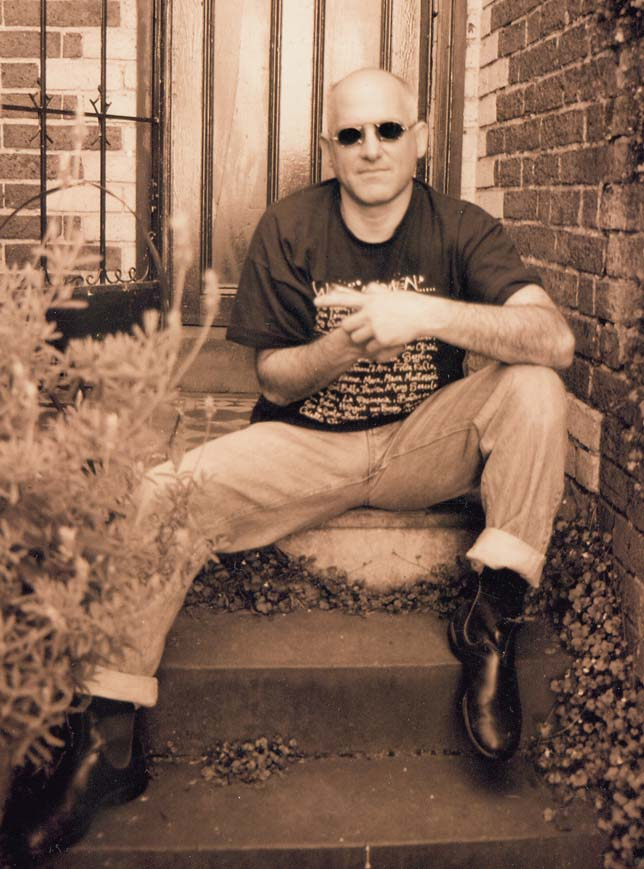
- Dolce in 2003

Background information
- Also known as: Joe Dolce Music Theatre
- Born: Joseph Dolce; 13 October 1947 (age 79); Painesville, Ohio, US
- Occupations: Singer; songwriter; poet; essayist
- Instruments: Vocals; mandolin; acoustic guitar; electric guitar; harmonica
- Years active: 1968–present
- Labels: MCA; Full Moon/Astor; Hammard; PolyGram
- Website: joedolce.net

Joseph Dolce (/ˈdoʊltʃeɪ/, originally /ˈdoʊlts/; born October 13, 1947) is an American and Australian singer, songwriter, poet and essayist.

Dolce achieved international recognition with his multi-million-selling novelty song "Shaddap You Face", released worldwide under the name of his one-man show, Joe Dolce Music Theatre, in 1980–1981. The single reached number one in 15 countries. It has sold more than 450,000 copies in Australia and continues to be the most successful Australian-produced single worldwide, selling an estimated six million copies. It reached No. 1 on the Australian Kent Music Report singles chart for eight weeks from November 1980.

== Life and career ==
=== 1947–1977: Early years ===
Dolce was born in 1947 in Painesville, Ohio, the eldest of three children to Italian-American parents. He graduated from Thomas W. Harvey High School in 1965. During his senior year, he played the lead role of Mascarille in Molière's Les Précieuses Ridicules for a production staged by the French Club of Lake Erie College, which was his first time on stage, acting and singing an impromptu song he created from the script. The play was well received and his performance was noted by director Jake Rufli, who later invited him to be part of his production of Jean Anouilh's Eurydice.

His co-star in Les Précieuses Ridicules was a sophomore on a creative writing scholarship at Lake Erie College, Carol Dunlop, who introduced him to folk music, poetry and the writings of William Faulkner and Ernest Hemingway. Dunlop later married the Argentine novelist Julio Cortázar. Dolce attended Ohio University, majoring in architecture, from 1965 to 1967 before deciding to become a professional musician.

While attending college at Ohio University in Athens, Ohio, he formed various bands including Headstone Circus, with Jonathan Edwards who subsequently went on as a solo artist to have a charting hit song in the US ("Sunshine"). Edwards subsequently recorded five Dolce songs including "Athens County", "Rollin' Along", "King of Hearts", "The Ballad of Upsy Daisy" and "My Home Ain't in the Hall of Fame", the latter song becoming an alt-country classic also recorded by Robert Earl Keen, Rosalie Sorrels, J. D. Crowe & the New South and many others.

=== 1978–1984: Move to Australia, "Boat People" and "Shaddap You Face" ===
Dolce relocated to Melbourne, Victoria, Australia, in 1978. His first single there was "Boat People"—a protest song on the poor treatment of Vietnamese refugees—which was translated into Vietnamese and donated to the fledgling Vietnamese community starting to form in Melbourne. His one-man show, Joe Dolce Music Theatre, was performed in cabarets and pubs with various line-ups, including his longtime partner Lin Van Hek.

In July 1980, he recorded the self-penned "Shaddap You Face", for the Full Moon Records label, at Mike Brady's new studios in West Melbourne. When in Ohio, Dolce would sometimes visit his Italian grandparents and extended family and they used the phrases "What's the matter, you?" and "Eh, shaddap", which Dolce adapted and used in the song. He wrote the song about Italians living in Australia and first performed it at Marijuana House, Brunswick Street, Fitzroy, in 1979. It became a multi-million-selling hit, peaking at No. 1 on the Australian Kent Music Report singleschart for eight weeks from November 1980, in the UK from February 1981 for three weeks, and also No. 1 in Germany, France, Fiji, Puerto Rico, the Canadian province of Quebec, Austria New Zealand and Switzerland. Dolce received the Advance Australia Award in 1981. The song has had hundreds of cover versions over the decades including releases by artists as diverse as Lou Monte, Sheila (France), Andrew Sachs (Manuel in Fawlty Towers), the actor Samuel L. Jackson and the hip-hop artist KRS-One. In 2018, the first Russian-language version was released by two of Moscow's most popular singers, Kristina Orbakaite and Philipp Kirkorov. The song has been translated into 15 languages, including an Australian Aboriginal dialect.

By February 1981, the song had become Australia's best-selling single ever, selling 290,000 copies, entering the Guinness Book of World Records and surpassing the previous record of 260,000 copies by Brady's own "Up There Cazaly".

"Shaddap You Face" has continued to be licensed and recorded by other artists and companies since its release in 1980, with its most recent appearance in 2021 as part of the US series The Morning Show (aka Morning Wars in Australia).

The follow up single, "If You Wanna Be Happy", was released in 1981 and charted in Australia and New Zealand. In December 1981, Dolce released the album Christmas in Australia which peaked at number 92 on the Australian chart.

=== 1984–present ===
With Lin Van Hek, he formed various performance groups including Skin the Wig, La Somnambule (1984) and the ongoing Difficult Women (1993). Van Hek and Dolce co-wrote "Intimacy" for the soundtrack of the 1984 film The Terminator, now part of the US Library of Congress collection. He was a featured lead actor in the Australian film Blowing Hot and Cold (1988). He has continued to perform solo and with Van Hek as part of their music-literary cabaret Difficult Women.

In 2010, two of his photos were selected for publication in the US journal Tupelo Quarterly.

Since 2009, he has been a prolifically published poet in Australia. In 2010, he won the 25th Launceston Poetry Cup at the Tasmanian Poetry Festival. His poems were selected for Best Australian Poems 2014 & 2015. He was the winner of the 2017 University of Canberra Vice-Chancellor's Health Poetry Prize, for a choral libretto, longlisted in the same year for the University of Canberra Vice-Chancellor's Poetry Prize and included in the Irises anthology. He longlisted for the 2018 University of Canberra Vice-Chancellor's Poetry Prize and was included in the Silence anthology. He was Highly Commended for the 2020 ACU Poetry Prize and included in the Generosity anthology. He was selected as the August 2020 City of Melbourne Poet Laureate.

== Poetry ==
Collections

- Dolce, Joe (2010). Hatbox. Carlton North, Victoria: Dolceamore Music.
- Dolce, Joe (2017). On Murray's Run : poems & lyrics. Selected by Les Murray. Port Adelaide, South Australia: Ginninderra Press.
- Dolce, Joe (2023). At the Noisy Cafe : Selected Poems 2017-2023. Carlton North, Victoria: Busybird Publishing.

== Books ==
- Dolce, Joe (2023). Joe Dolce Cooks. My Most Loved Recipes. Carlton North, Victoria: Busybird Publishing.
- Dolce, Joe (2026). Crooked Timber : Studies in Film and Music. Carlton North, Victoria: Dolceamore Publishing.

== Discography ==
=== Albums ===
List of albums, with Australian chart positions
Title	Album details	Peak chart positions
Title	Album details	AUS
Shaddap You Face (as Joe Dolce Music Theatre)	Released: 1981; Format: LP, cassette; Label: Full Moon (FML 12001)	-
Christmas in Australia (as Joe Dolce Music Theatre)	Released: 1981; Format: LP, cassette; Label: Hammard (HAM 065)	92
Steal Away Home: The Songs of Motherwell-Dolce	Released: 1988; Format: Cassette; Label: Dolceamore Music (DM 001)	-
Pundulumura: Two Trees Together (with Lin Van Hek, Gnarayarrahe Waitaire and Ponjyflydu)	Released: 1991; Format: Cassette; Label: Dolceamore Music (DM 002)	-
Difficult Women (with Lin Van Hek)	Released: 1992; Format: Cassette; Label: Difficult Women (DW 001)	-
Difficult Women: Black Pepper with a Hint of Violets (with Lin Van Hek)	Released: 1995; Format: CD; Label: Difficult Women (DW 002)	-
Memoirs of a Mouth Organ	Released: 1997; Format: CD; Label: Dolceamore Music (DM 003)	-
Flower (with Lin Van Hek)	Released: 2000; Format: CD; Label: Difficult Women (DW 003)	-
Freelovedays	Released: 2004; Format: CD; Label: Dolceamore Music (DM 004)	-
The Wind Cries Mary	Released: 2007; Format: CD; Label: Dolceamore Music (DM 005)	-
Live at Poet House (with Lin Van Hek)	Released: 2019; Format: CD; Label: Difficult Women (DW 004)	-
Green-eyed Boy of the Rain	Released: 2024; Format: CD; Label: Dolceamore Music (DM 006)	-

=== Singles ===
List of singles, with Australian chart positions
Year	Title	Peak chart positions	Sales + certification
Year	Title	AUS	Sales + certification
1979	"Boat People"	-	
1980	"Shaddap You Face"	1	AUS: 290,000+
1981	"If You Want to Be Happy"	61	
1981	"Christmas in Australia" / "The 12 Days of Christmas"	-	
1982	"You Toucha My Car I Breaka You Face"	-	
