= Lin Van Hek =

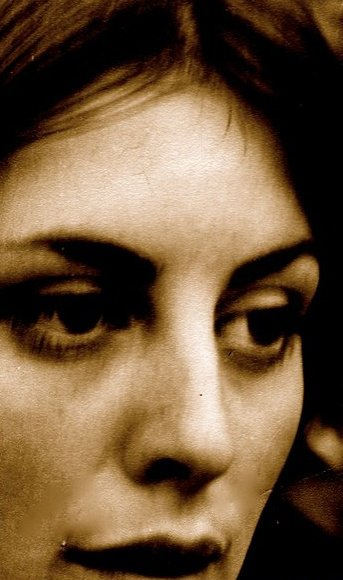

Background information
- Also known as: Lyn van Hecke
- Born: Lyn Whitehead; October 4, 1944 (age 81); Melbourne, Victoria, Australia
- Occupations: Artist, musician
- Formerly of: Difficult Women
- Website: www.linvanhek.com

Lyn Whitehead (born 4 October 1944), known professionally as Lin Van Hek a.k.a. Lyn van Hecke, is an Australian writer, singer, painter, designer and artist. She was a vice-president of the Society of Women Writers and co-founder of the literary-music group Difficult Women.

== Early life ==
Van Hek was born in Melbourne and lived in Europe and India while she was growing up.

== Career ==
Van Hek co-wrote and sang the song "Intimacy" for the soundtrack of the film The Terminator (1984). She later recorded a solo CD River of Life featuring songs of New Zealand writer Kath Tait. More recently, she has performed with her partner, Joe Dolce in Difficult Women, that began with a series of feminist literary salons van Hek held in the 1980s.

Van Hek also worked for over two decades with a group of women in North Vietnam designing, manufacturing and trading in hand-embroidered silk garments and textiles with a focus on fair trade and worker ethics.

Van Hek is a prolific painter and writer. She is described by Booker Prize-winning author Keri Hulme as writing "like an angel giving the devil her due."

== Bibliography ==
=== Novels ===
- The Hanging Girl (Misfit Books, 1988)
- The Ballad of Siddy Church (Spinifex, 1997)
- Katherine Mansfield's Black Paper Fan (Difficult Women, 2010)

=== Short fiction ===
Collections

- The Slain Lamb Stories (Independent, 1979)
- Anna's Box : selected short stories (Difficult Women, 2006)

Stories

Title	Year	First published	Reprinted/collected	Notes
Mrs Black	2003	Van Hek, Lin (2003). "Cat Tales: The Meaning of Cats in Women's Lives". Spinifex Press.		
The Goddess Paddock	2004	Van Hek, Lin (2004). "Horse Dreams: The Meaning of Horses in Women's Lives". Spinifex Press.		
This Most Privileged of Madnesses	2013	Van Hek, Lin (May 2013). "This Most Privileged of Madnesses". Quadrant.		
Mikel's Christmas	2017	Van Hek, Lin (June 2017). "Mikel's Christmas". Quadrant.		
Mrs Black	2017	Van Hek, Lin (December 2017). "Mrs Black". Quadrant.		
Herman and Manning	2019	Van Hek, Lin (June 2019). "Herman and Manning". Quadrant.		

=== Selected book reviews ===
Year	Review article	Work(s) reviewed
2020	Van Hek, Lin (January–February 2018). "Poetry of wildness". Quadrant. 62 (1–2 [543]): 85–86.	Petit, Pascale (2017). Mama Amazonica. Bloodaxe.

== Awards ==
- 1988 winner of the Melbourne The Age Short Story Award
- 2015 Best Australian Poems, edited by Geoff Page.
- 2016 & 2017 winner of the Society of Women Writers short story contest.
