= Edward P. Branch =

American politician (1842–1937)

5th Mayor of Melbourne, Florida
- In office December 6, 1892 – December 12, 1893
- Preceded by: L.P. Ely
- Succeeded by: H.D. Brown

Personal details
- Born: May 24, 1842 Painesville, Ohio
- Died: January 6, 1937 (aged 94) Jacksonville, Florida
- Spouse: Abbie Clark Branch
- Occupation: Merchant and banker

Edward P. Branch (May 24, 1842 – January 6, 1937) was a one-term mayor of Melbourne, Florida from 1892 to 1893.

Edward Branch attended the Madison Seminary, in Madison Ohio, from 1858 to 1860. When the Civil War broke out, he along with several of his schoolmates joined the fight. He enlisted in Co. F, 105th Ohio Volunteer Infantry.

He was a writer and wrote "Plain People - A Story of the Western Reserve". He often wrote to the editor of the Painesville's Telegraph about stories of growing up in Lake County Ohio. One of his letters lead to the Madison Seminary Reunions which were held from 1893 until sometime in the 1930s.

He came to Melbourne, Florida in 1886. He influenced Henry Flagler to bring the Florida East Coast Railway through Melbourne.

In 1889, he organized the First Congregational Church along with his wife, and 10 others. In 1913, he was a member of the National Council of Delegates for the American Congregational Church.

After the death of Richard W. Goode in 1912, he was appointed postmaster of Melbourne.

Preceded by L.P. Ely	Mayor of Melbourne, Florida; December 6, 1892 – December 12, 1893	Succeeded by H.D. Brown
