= Administration Building (Lake Erie College) =

Building in Painesville, Ohio

- Administration Building, Lake Erie College
- U.S. National Register of Historic Places
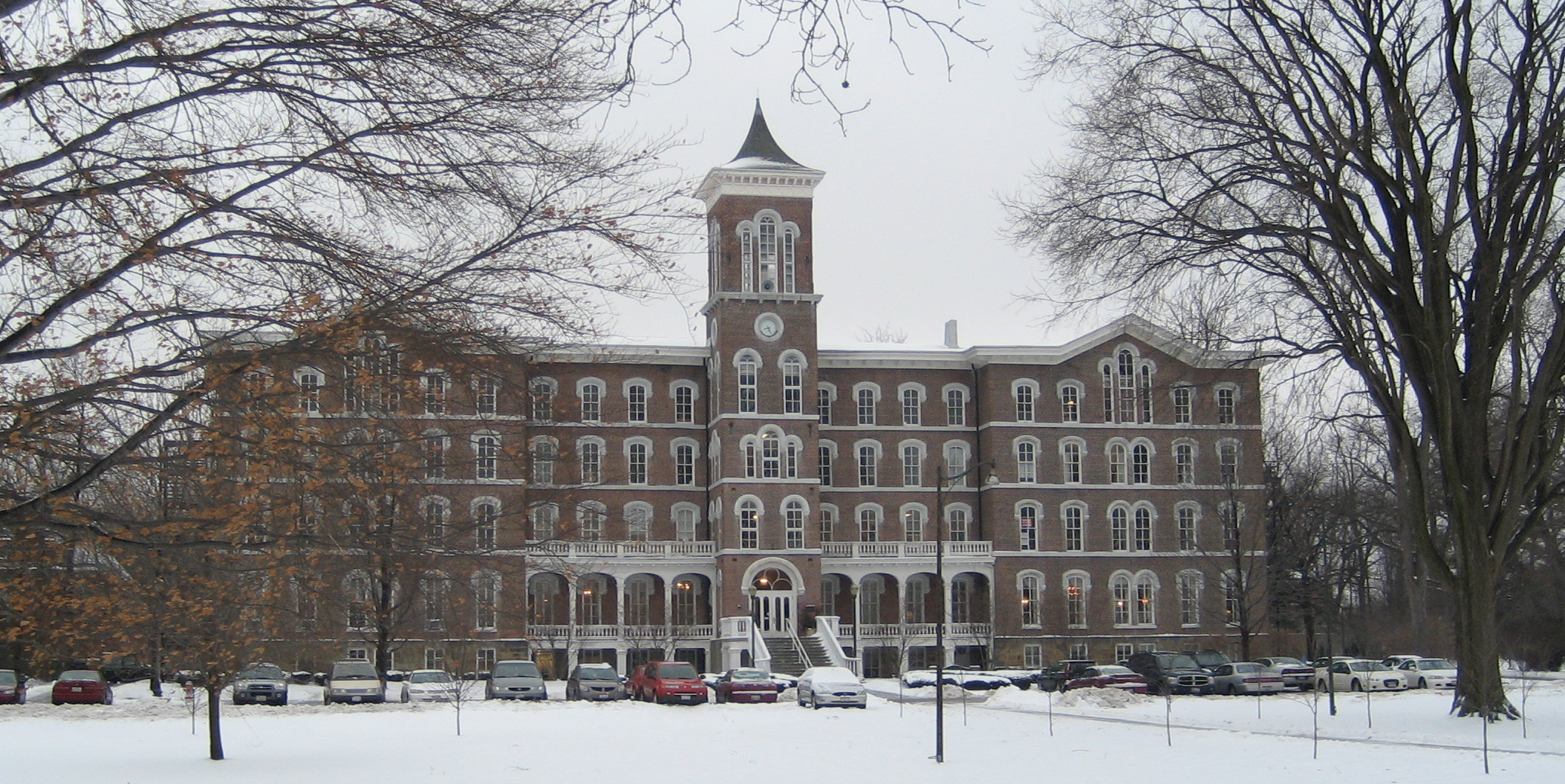
- Front of the Administration Building

- Location within Ohio Location within the United States
- Location: 391 W. Washington St., Painesville, Ohio
- Coordinates: 41°43′3″N 81°15′6″W
- Built: 1859
- Architect: Charles Wallace Heard
- Architectural style: Italian Villa
- NRHP reference No.: 73001486
- Added to NRHP: March 20, 1973

The Administration Building is a historic building on the campus of Lake Erie College in Painesville, Ohio, United States. It was listed on the National Register of Historic Places in 1973.
