= Frank Burrelle =

Frank Burrelle (May 25, 1856 – January 25, 1910) was the founder of Burrelle's Press Clipping Bureau, later called BurrellesLuce and today known as Burrelle's, a company providing media relations planning, media monitoring and media measurement services to public relations agencies, corporations, government agencies, universities and non-profit organizations throughout the United States.

== Personal life ==
Burrelle was born in Painesville, Ohio. He grew up in Ohio and attended school in Philadelphia, Pennsylvania. After he graduated, he pursued a career as a law clerk and tried his hand at the mining business before moving to New York City. In 1888, Frank overheard two businessmen complaining that it was becoming increasingly difficult to keep up with all the news about their company. The idea for a press clipping service was born. With the help of his wife, Burrelle started Burrelle's Press Clipping Bureau.

Burrelle was quick to get involved in organizations related to his business. As second vice president of the New York Press Club, Burrelle presided over the first of the Fall/Winter series of Club dinners in 1892, according to The New York Times. An active member for many years, he left the New York Press Club a small bequest in his will.

== A setback ==
In 1903, a fire broke out at 2 West 19th Street—the site of the four-story brownstone which served Burrelle as both residence and office. This blaze destroyed much of the furniture in the press clipping bureau and consumed thousands of irreplaceable press clippings, including Burrelle's personal collection of “principal articles and engravings relating the cause and effect of the late war with Spain." Fittingly, that building today houses a café called the NewsBar that sells newspapers and magazines alongside breakfast and lunch fare.

== Death ==
Burrelle died on Tuesday, January 25, 1910, at age 55, at sea on the way from Costa Rica to New Orleans. Mr. Burrelle who was accompanied by his second wife had been returning home from a trip to South America. Frank E. Campbell Funeral Home handled the final arrangements.

Arthur Wynne, the long-time general manager of the press clipping business and friend to Frank Burrelle, soon took the reins of the business, which eventually developed into BurrellesLuce
