= Burrelles =

American media monitoring service provider

Burrelles was an American company that provided media relations planning, monitoring, and measurement services, before ceasing operations in 2024.

== History ==
Founded in 1888 by Frank Burrelle and Robert Luce, BurrellesLuce, now Burrelles, was one of the leading media monitoring service providers in the United States. The company's CEO was Charles Waggoner; Chairman of the Board was Robert C. Waggoner. Burrelles was headquartered in Florham Park, New Jersey, and had offices throughout the United States.

=== Timeline ===
- In 1888, Burrelle's Press Clipping Bureau was founded by Frank Burrelle in New York City. Around the same time, Robert Luce founded Luce Press Clippings in Boston.
- In 1935, Burrelle's achieved national newspaper coverage.
- In 1940, Burrelle's achieved magazine coverage.
- In 1951, Southwest Clippings—operated by the French family—purchased Luce Press Clippings from Harvard.
- In 1960, Burrelle's Press Clipping Bureau became Burrelle's Information Services.
- In 1970, Burrelle's achieved broadcast and wire service coverage.
- In 1984, Burrelle's created Express to send the day's headlines and brief news summaries to executives via fax machine.
- In 1994, Burrelle's introduced NewsAlert, an online media monitoring service.
- In 2003, Burrelle's Information Service and Luce Press Clippings merged, forming what was known as BurrellesLuce.
- In 2007, BurrellesLuce introduced a new web portal called BurrellesLuce 2.0.
- In 2010, BurrellesLuce introduced BurrellesLuce WorkFlow, now MYNEWSDASH, its media outreach, monitoring, and analytics service portal.
- In 2012, BurrellesLuce acquired the U.S. print monitoring operations of Cision and becomes the only media monitoring service to provide print coverage.
- In 2019, BurrellesLuce rebranded as Burrelles and launched a significantly expanded portfolio of products and services.
- In 2024, Burrelles announced its exit from media monitoring entirely in a farewell post. All existing clients were transferred to Agility PR Solutions.

== Products and services ==
Burrelles provides communications professionals with a connection to their media data. The company's suite of services includes media monitoring, media outreach, customized reporting, analytical research, publishing, data services, and professional services.
