= Tony DeCarlo =

American football player (1940–2018)

Biographical details
- Born: July 12, 1940; Painesville, Ohio, U.S.
- Died: April 18, 2018 (aged 77); Cleveland, Ohio, U.S.

Playing career

Football
- 1958–1961: Kent State

Coaching career (HC unless noted)

Football
- 1964–1975: John Carroll (DC)
- 1987–1998: John Carroll

Wrestling
- 1964–1987: John Carroll

Administrative career (AD unless noted)
- 1987–2002: John Carroll

Head coaching record
- Overall: 90–27–4 (football)
- Tournaments: 1–2 (NCAA D-III playoffs)

Accomplishments and honors

Championships
- 2 OAC (1989, 1994)

Awards
- Football; 2× OAC Coach of the Year (1994, 1997)

Tony DeCarlo (July 12, 1940 – April 18, 2018) was an American football and collegiate wrestling coach. He served as the head football coach at John Carroll University from 1987 to 1998, compiling a record of 90–27–4.

== Head coaching record ==
=== Football ===
Year	Team	Overall	Conference	Standing	Bowl/playoffs
John Carroll Blue Streaks (Presidents' Athletic Conference) (1987–1988)
1987	John Carroll	5–4	3–3	4th	
1988	John Carroll	7–2	4–2	T–2nd	
John Carroll Blue Streaks (Ohio Athletic Conference) (1989–1998)
1989	John Carroll	9–2	7–1	1st	L NCAA Division III First Round
1990	John Carroll	8–2	8–1	2nd	
1991	John Carroll	5–3–2	5–2–2	T–3rd	
1992	John Carroll	8–2	7–2	T–2nd	
1993	John Carroll	6–4	5–4	4th	
1994	John Carroll	9–1	8–1	T–1st	
1995	John Carroll	6–2–2	5–2–2	3rd	
1996	John Carroll	9–1	8–1	2nd	
1997	John Carroll	10–2	8–1	2nd	L NCAA Division III Quarterfinal
1998	John Carroll	8–2	7–2	3rd	
John Carroll:		90–27–4	75–22–4		
Total:		90–27–4			
National championship Conference title Conference division title or championship game berth
