= Los autonautas de la cosmopista =

Book written by Julio Cortázar

Autonauts of the cosmoroute
- First Spanish edition
- Author: Julio Cortázar; Carol Dunlop
- Original title: Los autonautas de la cosmopista
- Language: Spanish
- Publisher: Muchnik Editores
- Publication date: 1983
- Pages: 308
- ISBN: 848550156X
- OCLC: 148073955

Los autonautas de la cosmopista ("The Autonauts of the Cosmoroute") is a book written by Julio Cortázar in collaboration with Carol Dunlop, who died shortly before it was published. It narrates the couple's extended expedition along the autoroute from Paris to Marseille during the months of May and June 1982.

== Publication ==
The book was written by the authors in Spanish- and French-language versions, which were published simultaneously. An English-language translation (as Autonauts of the Cosmoroute) was published by Archipelago Books in the U.S. in 2007, and Telegram books in the U.K. in 2008.
