= Casement (surname) =

Casement is a surname. Notable people with the surname include:

- Chris Casement (born 1988), Northern Irish professional footballer
- Frances Jennings Casement (1840–1938), American suffragette
- John S. Casement (1829–1909), Union Army officer and a noted railroad contractor.
- Roger Casement (1864–1916), Irish patriot, poet, revolutionary and nationalist
