= Shaddap You Face =

1980 single by Joe Dolce

Single by Joe Dolce Music Theatre
- B-side: "Ain't in No Hurry"
- Released: 1980 (international); April 1981 (U.S.)
- Recorded: 1980
- Genre: Polka; music hall; novelty
- Length: 3:13
- Label: Full Moon; Epic (UK); MCA (US)
- Songwriter: Joe Dolce
- Producers: Joe Dolce and Ian McKenzie

Joe Dolce singles chronology
"Boat People" (1979)	"Shaddap You Face" (1980)	"If You Want to Be Happy" (1981)

"Shaddap You Face" is a novelty song written and performed by Joe Dolce (also released under the name Joe Dolce Music Theatre in certain countries) about a rebellious Italian boy. Released in late 1980, it set a number of sales and longevity records.

It was released by Mike Brady's record label Full Moon Records. By February 1981, the single had sold over 290,000 units in Australia, surpassing Brady's own "Up There Cazaly" to become Australia's best-selling single ever. It was a number one single in 12 countries.

== Writing ==
Dolce, who is Italian-American, said he wrote "Shaddap You Face" based on memories of his childhood, when his family members would speak in broken English.

== Sales ==
"Shaddap You Face" went to number one for eight weeks on the Australia Kent Music Report in 1980. It reached number one on the UK Singles Chart on 21 February 1981 and stayed there for three weeks until 8 March 1981, keeping Ultravox's single "Vienna" out of the top spot throughout. The song became the 15th biggest hit of 1981 in the UK.

"Shaddap You Face" was also number one in 11 other countries. There have been over 50 different foreign language cover versions, and hundreds more published informally on YouTube with new versions of the song being recorded and uploaded every year.

In the US, the song peaked at number 53 in 1981 on the Billboard Hot 100, number 43 on the Cash Box Top 100, and number 24 on Record World. However, it was regularly played on the Dr. Demento show to the point of being number six on the year-end Funny 25 that year. In the Canadian province of Quebec, "Shaddap You Face" reached number one for twelve weeks.

== Other versions ==
Lou Monte released a cover of the song in 1981. Other notable cover versions have been done by KRS-One (hip-hop), EMF (British), Andrew Sachs (Manuel in the British television sitcom Fawlty Towers), Werner Böhm, alias: Gottlieb Wendehals (German, title: "Mensch, ärger dich nicht"), Sheila (French, titled: "Et ne la ramène pas"), Dingetje (Dutch, titled: "Houtochdiekop"), De Strangers (dialect from Antwerp, Belgium, titled: "Agget Mor Fret"), Volker Rosin und die Lollypops (German, titled: "Hörst du nicht die Kuh – Muh!"), Franco Franchi with the duo Franco e Ciccio (Italian, title: "Alì Alì Alè"), Laddi, alias: Eiríkur Fjalar (Icelandic, title: Skammastu þín svo,) a Yindjibarndi language version by Gnarnyarrhe Waitairie, a Papua New Guinean version by the Breeze Band (title: "Pasim Pes Bilong Yu" – Tok Pisin version), and a spoken word interpretation by Samuel L. Jackson.

A Czech interpretation written by Zdeněk Borovec, "Já na bráchu blues", performed by Helena Vondráčková and Jiří Korn, was a hit in Czechoslovakia in 1981.

The National Folk Festival in Canberra featured 'The Inspired Shaddap You Face Contest' in April 2006. Festival artists were invited to perform their interpretations of the classic song. The Cygnet Folk Festival in Tasmania featured the second 'Inspired Shaddap You Face Contest' in the following year. Joe Dolce was invited to be the MC at both events.

== Charts ==
=== Weekly charts ===
Chart (1980–1981)	Peak position
Australia (Kent Music Report)	1
Austria (Ö3 Austria Top 40)	1
Belgium (Ultratop 50 Flanders)	1
Canada Top Singles (RPM)	2
Denmark (IFPI)	5
Ireland (IRMA)	1
Israel (IBA)	4
Netherlands (Dutch Top 40)	4
Netherlands (Single Top 100)	4
New Zealand (Recorded Music NZ)	1
Norway (VG-lista)	2
South Africa (Springbok Radio)	1
Sweden (Sverigetopplistan)	5
Switzerland (Schweizer Hitparade)	1
UK Singles (Official Charts)	1
US Billboard Hot 100	53
US Cash Box Top 100	43
US Record World	24
West Germany (GfK)	1
Zimbabwe (ZIMA)	1

=== Year-end charts ===
Chart (1980)	Position
Australia (Kent Music Report)	45

Chart (1981)	Position
Australia (Kent Music Report)	31
Austria (Ö3 Austria Top 40)	13
Belgium (Ultratop)	19
Canada Top Singles (RPM)	20
Netherlands (Dutch Top 40)	59
Netherlands (Single Top 100)	42
South Africa (Springbok Radio)	1
Switzerland (Schweizer Hitparade)	6
UK Singles (OCC)	8
West Germany (Official German Charts)	17

== Certifications ==
Region	Certification	Certified units/sales
Australia (ARIA)	3× Platinum	300,000^{^}
United Kingdom (BPI)	Gold	500,000^{^}
^{^} Shipments figures based on certification alone.

== Parodies ==
"Bite Your Bum", a parody of "Shaddap You Face", was made in 1981 by Australian artists Peter Plus with Bazz and Pilko (Barry Ion and Tony Pilkington). It reached No. 32 in New Zealand.

Another parody was composed in 1991 for a McCain pizza slices television commercial in the United Kingdom, entitled "Fillap You Face" (fill up your face).
