= TR Ericsson =

American painter

TR Ericsson (born 1972) is an American artist who lives and works in Brooklyn, New York and Painesville, Ohio. Since his mother’s death in 2003, his practice has circulated around her life story, drawing from an inherited archive that documents four generations of family life in the American Midwest.

== Early life and education ==
Ericsson grew up in Willoughby, Ohio where he lived with his mother. From 1990 to 1991, he studied at the Cleveland Institute of Art, before moving to New York to pursue academic training in traditional figurative drawing, painting and printmaking at the Art Students League of New York and National Academy School. During this period he lived at the 92nd Street Y - De Hirsch Residence.

After graduation, Ericsson worked as a portrait painter and was a semi-professional pool player. In 1996, he married the artist Cassandra MacLeod. The couple divorced in 2004. Ericsson remarried several years later. Together with Rosemary Ericsson (née Fakult), he has a daughter named Susie who was born in 2008.

== Crackle and Drag ==
In the years following his mother’s suicide in 2003, Ericsson amassed an archive that would lay the groundwork for his ongoing series Crackle & Drag. “Crackle and Drag,” builds from his family archive, combining a wide range of different media to produce time-based artworks, books, zines, and sculptures as well as works on paper, panel and muslin, which employ DIY silkscreen techniques and materials such as nicotine, alcoholic cocktails, and the funerary ashes of family members.

The title “Crackle and Drag,” is appropriated from a Paul Westerberg song, which pays homage to the poet Sylvia Plath. When Ericsson researched the lyrics to the song, he encountered Plath’s poem “Edge”, written shortly before the young poet killed herself. The poem ends with the following words: “She is used to this sort of thing. Her blacks crackle and drag.” According to Ericsson reading Plath’s poem was an epiphany: “I instantly knew I had found a way to contextualize all the things I was doing around my mother’s death.”

== Exhibitions, collections and awards ==
Notable acquisitions of artist books, photographs, paintings, works on paper and sculptures, include those by the Cleveland Museum of Art, the Dallas Museum of Art, the Indianapolis Museum of Art, the Fine Arts Library of the Harvard Library, the Progressive Collection, the Whitney Museum, the Yale University Arts Library, the Museum of Modern Art Library, and the Smithsonian Institution Libraries.

In 2015, the artist’s first solo museum exhibition, Crackle & Drag, opened at the Cleveland Museum of Art/Transformer Station, accompanied by a Yale University Press monograph that was shortlisted for the Paris Photo-Aperture Foundation and Kraszna Krausz Book awards. A 2017 recipient of the Print Center’s annual international award, “Crackle & Drag” was also the subject of a solo exhibition at the Everson Museum of Art.

In 2018, Ericsson installed a large-scale outdoor bronze sculpture for a private collection in Northeast Ohio that includes works by Richard Serra, Sol Lewitt, Roxy Paine, AI Wei Wei, and Andy Goldsworthy. In 2019 one of his “letter works” was included in the group exhibition Frederick Douglass: Embers of Freedom at SCAD Museum of art in Savannah, Georgia.. Ericsson’s work and writing are included in the publication Amor Mundi: The Collection of Marguerite Steed Hoffman. In 2023, he began his project “57 Years” in which he will paint one work for each year of his mother’s life. According to the dealer Harlan Levey Projects, the project will be completed in 2028 when Ericsson turns 57.
