= Minerva Dayton Bateham =

American hymn writer

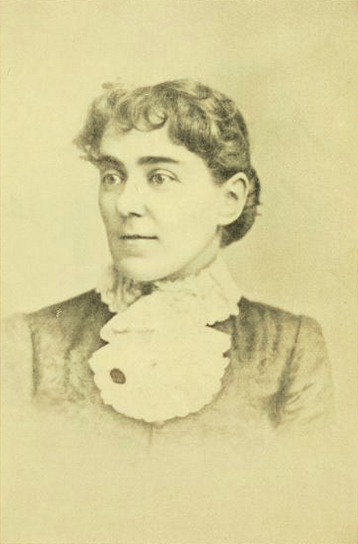
- Minnie D. Bateham, from an 1895 book
- Born: March 14, 1856; Columbus, Ohio
- Died: October 30, 1885 (aged 29); Painesville, Ohio
- Other names: Minnie D. Bateham
- Occupation: Writer

Minerva Dayton Bateham (March 14, 1856 – October 30, 1885), known as Minnie D. Bateham, was an American poet and hymn writer. She was physically disabled by illness from age 12 until her death at age 29.

== Early life ==
Bateham was born in Columbus, Ohio, the oldest daughter of Michael Boyd Bateham and Josephine Abiah Penfield Cushman Bateham. Her father was an editor and publisher, and head of the Ohio State Board of Agriculture. Her mother, a graduate of Oberlin College, was a missionary in Haiti with her first husband, and was active in temperance work. Both parents were active in peace work, and attended an international peace conference in London in 1851.

She attended Oberlin Academy in 1868. At age 12, she was struck by an illness that affected her bones and joints (which was called "necrosis of the bone" at the time, with symptoms similar to avascular necrosis), and caused limitations in her physical activity as well as significant pain. She used a wheelchair and crutches at times. Bateham endured several surgeries in hope of relief. In 1871, she was rescued from a house fire by neighbors. Her younger sister died of peritonitis in 1872.

== Career ==
Bateham read, wrote, studied, did needlework, and taught a younger sibling from her bed. She followed mail-order courses in Greek and other subjects, and entered writing and puzzle contests in magazines. She won one contest from Little Corporal magazine, for writing "Mrs. Higgins's First Night in Mississippi", a story that used "i" as its only vowel throughout.

Bateham was known as a poet and hymn writer. Her hymns include "He who once suffered now reigneth a King", "I am thine, my blessed Lord", and "Praise ye the Lord, all ye people and nations". She wrote new lyrics for the Marseillaise and the Star-Spangled Banner, for the use of local temperance groups, and other occasional songs for holiday celebrations. She was a regular contributor to a children's religious magazine, Young Folks' Record, writing inspirational columns on nature, language, and other topics.

Bateham taught and sang at neighborhood and church events. She assisted her mother in temperance work, and was secretary of the Young Ladies' Mission Society of Painesville.

== Personal life ==
Bateham died from typhoid fever in 1885, aged 29 years, in Painesville, Ohio. In 1895, her mother published a biography and collection of Bateham's writings, under the title The Invalid Singer: Life and Writings of Minnie D. Bateham.
