= Eschines P. Matthews =

American politician

Eschines Pierson Matthews (September 11, 1832 – July 30, 1913) was an American businessman, manufacturer, and politician.

== Biography ==
Born in Painesville, Ohio, Matthews moved to Milwaukee, Wisconsin in 1857. Matthews and his brothers started Matthew Brothers a furniture manufacturing business. Matthews served on the Milwaukee Common Council and was a Republican. In 1881, Matthews served in the Wisconsin State Assembly. Matthews died at his home, in Milwaukee, Wisconsin, after suffering ill health.
