= Painesville City Local School District =

School district in Ohio, United States

Address
- 58 Jefferson Street Painesville, Ohio, 44077; United States
- Coordinates: 41°43′22″N 81°14′59″W

District information
- Type: Public
- Grades: PK–12
- Schools: 6
- NCES District ID: 3910015

Students and staff
- Students: 2,744 (2024–2025)
- Teachers: 162.40 (on an FTE basis) (2024–2025)
- Staff: 282.22 (on an FTE basis) (2024–2025)
- Student–teacher ratio: 16.90 (2024–2025)

Other information
- Website: www.painesville-city.k12.oh.us

The Painesville City Local School District is a public school district based in Painesville, Ohio, United States.

The vast majority of the Painesville city limits is in this district.

== Schools ==
- Thomas W. Harvey High School
- Heritage Middle School
- Chestnut Elementary School
- Elm Street Elementary School
- Maple Elementary School
- Red Raider Preschool

== New buildings ==
From 2005 to 2010, The Painesville City Local School District is building five new school buildings to replace aging facilities.

- Chestnut Elementary School opened August 2007.
- Maple and Elm Street Elementary Schools and Heritage Middle School opened August 2008.
- Harvey High School opened Fall 2009.

== See also ==
- List of school districts in Ohio
