= Josephine Cushman Bateham =

American social reformer, editor and writer

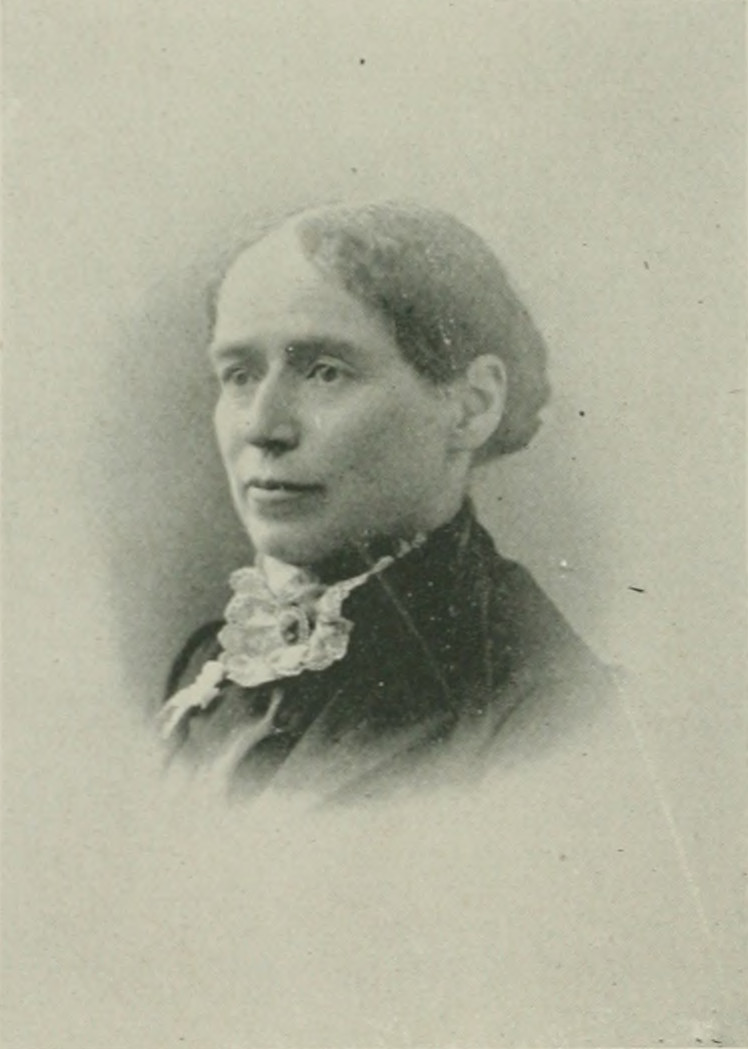
- "A Woman of the Century"
- Born: Josephine Abiah Penfield; November 1, 1829; Alden, New York, U.S.
- Died: March 15, 1901 (aged 71); Oberlin, Ohio, U.S.
- Resting place: Painesville, Ohio, U.S.
- Education: Oberlin College
- Occupations: social reformer; editor; writer
- Spouses: Richard S. Cushman (m. 1848; died 1849); Michael Boyd Bateham (m. 1850; died 1880)
- Children: Anson; Minerva; Josephine; Lizzie; Sarah; Henry; Charles
- Parents: Anson and Minerva (Dayton) Penfield; Henry Cowles (step-father)
- Writing career
- Pen name: Mrs. J. C. Bateham
- Language: English
- Subject: temperance

Josephine Cushman Bateham (née Josephine Abiah Penfield; after first marriage, Cushman, after second marriage, Bateham; pen name, Mrs. J. C. Bateham; November 1, 1829 – March 15, 1901) was an American social reformer, editor, and writer in the temperance movement. The Sabbath Observance Department of the National Woman's Christian Temperance Union (WCTU) was organized at the St. Louis (National) Convention in 1884, and Bateham, then of Painesville, Ohio, was appointed its first Superintendent, continuing in charge of the department until compelled by failing health to resign in 1896. In addition, Bateham was a supporter of social reform for women.

== Early life and education ==
Josephine Abiah Penfield was born on November 1, 1829, in Alden, New York, to Anson and Minerva (Dayton) Penfield. She had one sister and four brothers. When she was five years old, her family moved to Oberlin, Ohio, where her father worked as a mechanic and manufacturer of edge tools. Penfield's father was killed in a machinery accident in 1838, and two of her siblings died in the years following.

In 1844, Penfield's mother married Oberlin College professor Henry Cowles. The family was closely involved with life at Oberlin College, with Penfield's mother serving as a member of the college's Ladies' Board of Managers and both her mother and stepfather contributing to the Oberlin Evangelist.

Penfield went on to attend Oberlin College, graduating in 1847 with an L.B. degree.

== Career ==
After graduating from Oberlin, Penfield taught at a local school for a year. On July 20, 1848, she married Richards Cushman, of Attleboro, Massachusetts, and the couple went on a foreign mission to Saint-Marc, Haiti. Her husband died after eleven months of service, after which Cushman returned to Oberlin.

Upon her return, Cushman taught for a short time at Oberlin College. On September 27, 1850, she married Michael Boyd Bateham (1813–1880), head of the Ohio State Board of Agriculture. He was also the founder, editor, and publisher of the Ohio Cultivator in Columbus, Ohio. They resided in Columbus fourteen years, spending part of their summers in travel in Europe and the United States. Having previously been a contributor to the Oberlin Evangelist, Bateham became the editor of the Ohio Cultivator's ladies department, while Frances Dana Barker Gage was an associate editor. Bateham wrote articles on dress, education, exercise, gardening, health, housekeeping, peace, and woman's rights. She continued to be a contributor to the Ohio Cultivator after her husband sold it in 1855; it merged with the Ohio Farmer in 1864.

Bateham and her husband participated in the Ohio State Peace Society and were delegates to the 1851 international peace congress held in London. They were active members of their church community.

In 1864, Bateham and her family moved to Painesville, Ohio, where they ran a fruit farm and raised their seven children. During this time, Bateham continued to write for agricultural publications and became increasingly involved in the temperance movement.

At the opening of the Women's Temperance Crusade in Ohio, in 1874, Bateham became the leader of the Painesville crusade band, and later, one of the leaders in the State WCTU. Beginning in 1884, Bateham served as national superintendent of the WCTU's Department for the Suppression of Sabbath Desecration, with her eldest daughter, Minerva Dayton Bateham, serving as her secretary. At Bateham's request, the name was changed to "Department of Sabbath Observance". In 1896, owing to failing health, Bateham was forced to decline renomination.

In 1890, Bateham relocated to Asheville, North Carolina and continued her work for the WCTU, traveling to nearly every U.S. state and territory and through the Hawaiian Islands to deliver nearly 300 lectures. She wrote many leaflets on Sabbath questions, of which she sent out more than a million pages every year. On behalf of the "Sunday-law combination" in the U.S., Bateham asked the U.S. Congress to incorporate the dogma of Sunday idleness into a Federal statute.

== Personal life ==
From 1892 to 1897, she lived in Williamsburg, Kentucky with daughter Sarah. In 1897, she removed to Norwalk, Ohio, where two other children made their homes.

The Batehams had seven children: Anson, Minerva (Minnie), Josephine, Lizzie, Sarah, Henry, and Charles. In religion, Mrs. Bateham belonged to the Congregational church before becoming a Presbyterian.

Josephine Penfield Cushman Bateham died in Oberlin, March 15, 1901, and was buried in Painesville.

== Selected works ==
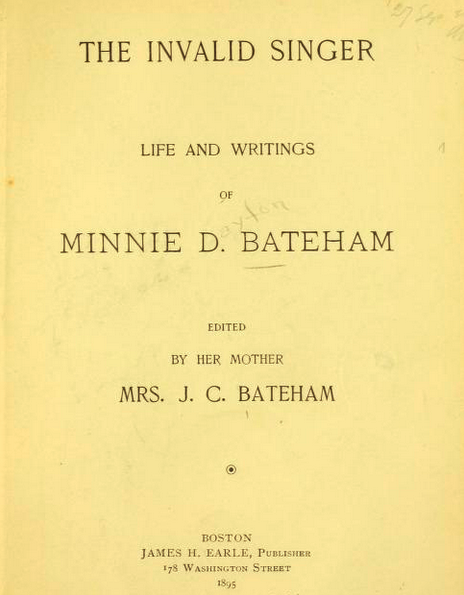
The Invalid Singer (1895)

=== Books ===
- Sabbath Observance Manual (1892)

=== Hymns ===
- "We'll all rise up together"

=== Edited volumes ===
- The invalid singer; life and writings of Minnie D. Bateham, by Mrs. J. C. Bateham (1895)
