= Difficult Women (cabaret) =

Literary-folk music cabaret created in 1992

Difficult Women is a literary-folk music cabaret created in 1992 in Melbourne by Lin Van Hek and Joe Dolce and has been performing internationally for 15 years.

== History ==
Difficult Women, a name taken from the Salem witch trials, was established as a literary-folk music project by Lin Van Hek and her domestic partner, Joe Dolce, in early 1992. Hek performed the roles to Dolce's compositions. Nicole Leedham of The Canberra Times observed, "to some they are difficult women, to others they were courageous... Hek is bringing these women alive with her theatrical collaboration with musician [Dolce]." The group works through a combination of theatrical vignettes, original music, songs, harmony singing and oration, to tell the stories of women who were labelled "difficult" by society for their willingness to defy what was expected of them. The Guardian's David Fickling noted that [the show is] about pioneering feminists who were thought in their time to be 'difficult', rather than visionary."

A typical show contains over four hours of material on important women including Virginia Woolf, Sylvia Plath, Frida Kahlo, Memphis Minnie, Sonya Tolstoi, Gertrude Stein, Alice B. Toklas, Camille Claudel, Katherine Mansfield and Louisa Lawson. Its first run was in mid-June 1992 at La Mama Theatre, Carlton.

A Canberra performance in March 1994 was covered by The Canberra Times: "the portraits were gentle but clear, clever and minor costume changes marking the differences. Strange Australian aunts and the work of Dale Spender on the links between gender and language mingled with Madam Tolstoy, who wrote out War and Peace 53 times by hand for her husband." The run at the Carclew Ballroom, North Adelaide, was over four days in mid-July of that year.

In February 1995, Difficult Women was performed at Budinski's Theatre of Exile, Carlton. In 2007, a performance was in the Victoria rural city of Castlemaine, at the Acquador Room, in April.

== Bibliography ==
- Van Hek, Lin; Dolce, Joe (1998), Difficult Women, L. Van Hek & J. Dolce
