= Henry Cowles (theologian) =

American theological scholar and abolitionist (1803–1881)

Reverend Henry Cowles Doctor Divinitatis

Personal life
- Born: April 24, 1803 Norfolk, Connecticut
- Died: September 7, 1881 (aged 78)
- Children: Step-Daughter; Josephine Penfield Cushman Bateham

Religious life
- Religion: Christianity
- Denomination: Evangelism
- School: Yale, graduated 1826; Yale Divinity School 1826-1888; Hillsdale College, graduated 1863

Henry Cowles (April 24, 1803 – September 7, 1881) was an American theological scholar and abolitionist.

== Personal life ==
Cowles, son of Olive Phelps and Samuel Cowles, was born in Norfolk, Conn., April 24, 1803.

He was married, July 30, 1830, to Alice Welch, daughter of Benjamin Welch, M.D., of Norfolk, Connecticut, who died October 14, 1843. They had three sons and three daughters, of whom one son (John Guiteau Welch Cowles) and one daughter (Sarah Florella Cowles) survived him. In March 1844, he married Minerva Dayton. She was the daughter of William Dayton, of Watertown, and widow of Anson Penfield, of Oberlin, who died November 29, 1880. He became the stepfather of Josephine Penfield Cushman Bateham, social reformer, editor, and writer.

Of September 7, 1881, at the age of 78, Cowles died of ataxia while at his daughter Sarah's home in Janesville, Wisconsin.

== Education ==
Cowles graduated from Yale College in 1826.

After two years of study in the Yale Divinity School, he was ordained, with a view to home-missionary work, at Hartford, Conn., July 1, 1828.

Cowles went to Ohio in 1929, and after laboring about two years in Ashtabula and Sandusky, took charge of the Congregational Church in Austinburg, where he remained until the fall of 1835, when he became Professor of Latin and Greek in Oberlin College. In 1838 he was transferred to the chair of Ecclesiastical History, and in 1840 to that of Hebrew, in the Theological Department, in which he continued until 1848, at that time he became the editor of the Oberlin Evangelist, which he conducted until 1863. For the rest of his life he remained in Oberlin as trustee. During the fourteen years from 1867 he published sixteen volumes of Commentaries, covering the whole Scriptures, and devoted the profits arising from them to the missionary cause.

He received the degree of Doctor of Divinity from Hillsdale College, Michigan, in 1863.

== Publications ==
Cowles’ publications include;

- Holiness Of Christians In The Present Life (1841)
- Gospel Manna for Christian Pilgrims (1847)
- Ezekiel and Daniel with Notes (1867)
- The Minor Prophets with Notes (1867)
- The Minor Prophets with Notes (1867)
- Isaiah with Notes (1868)
- The Psalms with Notes (1872)
- The Pentateuch (1874)
- Excursus On The Atonement
