= Thomas W. Harvey High School =

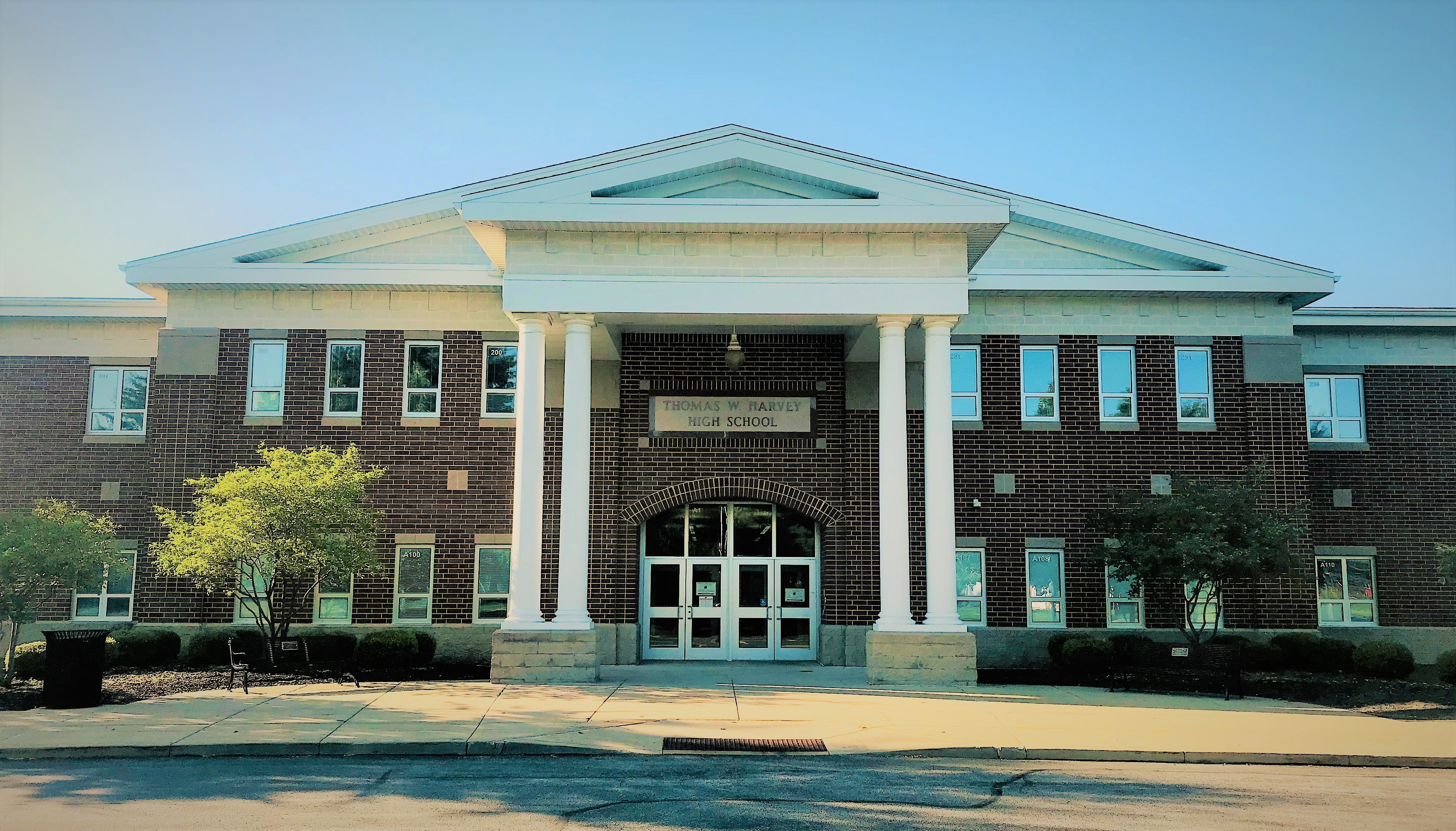
- Thomas W. Harvey High School in August 2022

Location
- 200 West Walnut Avenue; Painesville, (Lake County), Ohio 44077; United States; 41°42′56″N 81°14′47″W

Information
- Type: Public, Coeducational high school
- Motto: Engaging All Students Today For Tomorrow's World
- Opened: 1922
- School district: Painesville City Local School District
- NCES School ID: 391001501488
- Principal: Byron Hopkins
- Staff: 45.00 (on an FTE basis)
- Grades: 9–12
- Enrollment: 847 (2024–25)
- Student to teacher ratio: 18.82
- Colors: Red and black
- Athletics conference: Chagrin Valley Conference
- Team name: Red Raiders
- Accreditation: North Central Association of Colleges and Schools
- Website: harvey.painesville-city.k12.oh.us

Thomas W. Harvey High School is a public high school in Painesville, Ohio, United States. It is the only high school in the Painesville City Local School District. Athletic teams are known as the Red Raiders, and they compete in the Ohio High School Athletic Association as a member of the Chagrin Valley Conference.

== History ==
In November 1922, a new high school building was dedicated on West Washington Street and officially named Harvey High School in honor of Thomas W. Harvey, a longtime educator and superintendent of Painesville schools in the late 19th century. This facility included academic classrooms, laboratories, administrative offices, a gymnasium, and an auditorium and was Painesville’s main high school for decades. Over the years, it expanded with new wings and additions, including classroom space, a library, cafeteria, gym enhancements, and other improvements, reflecting the growth of the school and community throughout the 20th century.

As part of a district‑wide construction program from 2005 to 2010, a brand‑new Thomas W. Harvey High School facility was constructed to replace the aging 1922 building and other older structures. The current high school at 200 West Walnut Avenue opened to students during the 2009–2010 school year, returning from Thanksgiving break on November 30, 2009, and was formally dedicated the following month.

== Extracurricular activities ==
Thomas W. Harvey High School offers a wide range of student‑centered extracurricular activities designed to complement academic learning and enrich the high school experience. These activities are authorized by the Painesville City Local Schools Board of Education and are supported by faculty sponsors, allowing students from all grade levels to participate as long as they meet eligibility requirements.

Students at Harvey can engage in academic and interest‑based clubs that foster creativity, leadership, and community involvement outside the classroom. Among the opportunities available are Academic Challenge teams that encourage critical thinking and competition, an Art Club for visual expression, and a Chess Club that supports strategy and analytical skills.

The school also supports organizations that promote school spirit and student leadership, such as Class Officers, Student Council, and Student Ambassadors, providing platforms for students to have a voice in school events and initiatives. Additionally, groups like Club Red (a drug‑free advocacy club) and ROX (Ruling Our Experience) focus on wellness and positive social engagement.

Harvey’s extracurricular offerings extend into creative and performing arts and community programming. Students can participate in the Fall Play and Spring Musical, join Pep Band or Flag Line to support school events, and contribute to the Yearbook Committee to document school life. Unique interest clubs like Fishing Club, Gaming Club, and Futsal Club provide additional ways for students to connect over shared hobbies.

== Athletics ==
Harvey High School currently offers:

- Baseball
- Basketball
- Cross country
- Cheerleading
- Golf
- Football
- Soccer
- Softball
- Tennis
- Track and field
- Volleyball

== Notable alumni ==
- Joe Dolce, singer-songwriter, poet, and essayist
- Danny Nardico, former professional boxer and wrestler
- Tom Rossley, former professional and college football coach
- Don Shula, former professional football head coach in the National Football League (NFL)
