= Painesville City Hall =

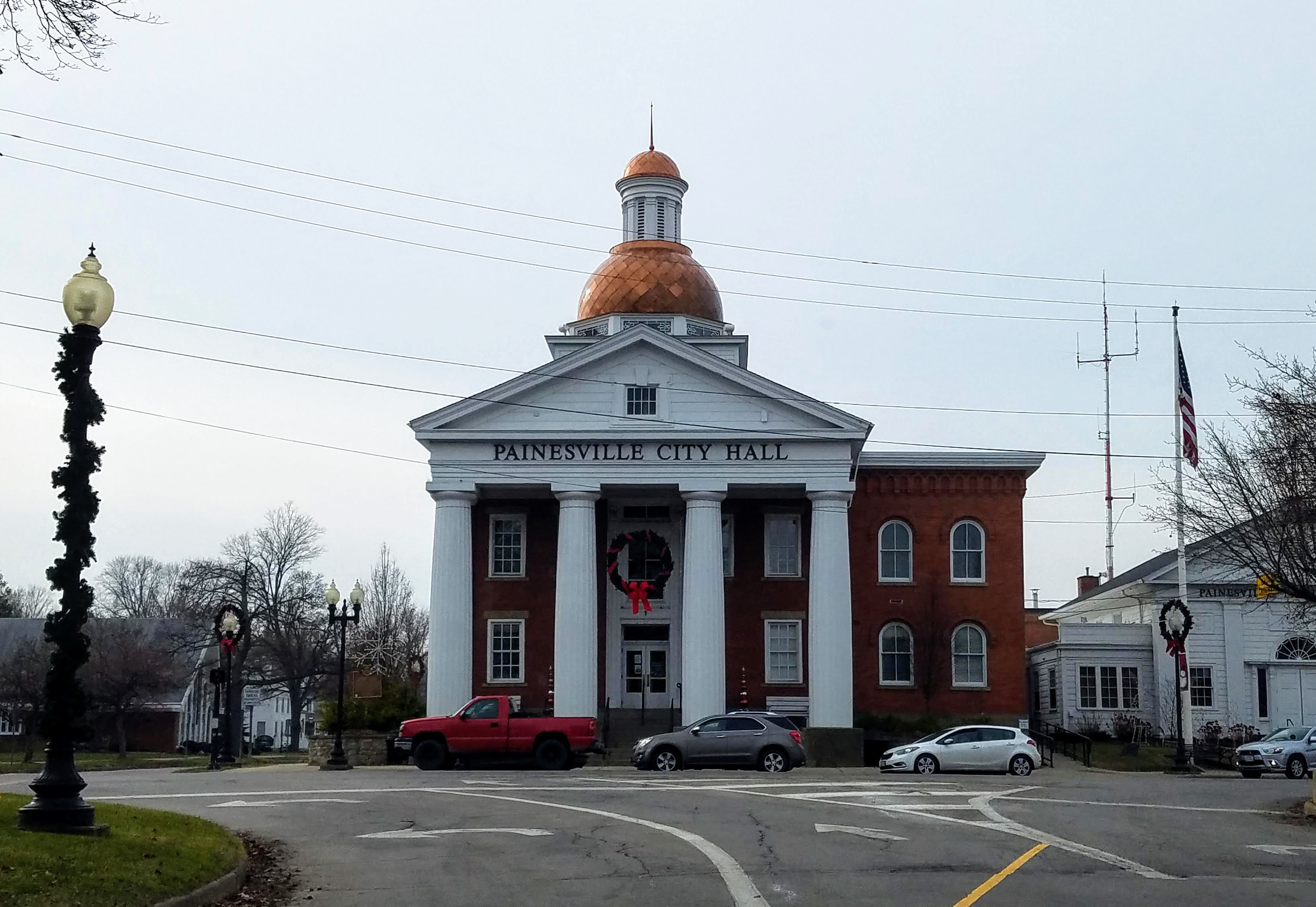
- Interactive map of the Painesville City Hall area
- Alternative names: Old Lake County Courthouse

General information
- Architectural style: Greek Revival
- Location: 7 Richmond Street; Painesville, Ohio; United States
- Coordinates: 41°43′27.3″N 81°14′43.8″W
- Construction started: 1840
- Completed: 1852
- Renovated: 1909

U.S. National Register of Historic Places
- Designated: July 24, 1972
- Reference no.: 72001028

U.S. Historic district – Contributing property
- Designated: August 3, 1978
- Part of: Mentor Avenue Historic District

U.S. Historic district – Contributing property
- Designated: June 29, 2020
- Part of: Downtown Painesville Historic District

The Painesville City Hall is the seat of the municipal government for the city of Painesville in the U.S. state of Ohio. The building is also referred to as the Old Lake County Courthouse due to its initial construction as the county courthouse for Lake County. City Hall was listed on the National Register of Historic Places in 1972, and was designated a contributing property of the Mentor Avenue and Downtown Painesville historic districts in 1978 and 2020, respectively.

== History ==
On March 6, 1840, Lake County was split from Geauga County by an act of the Ohio General Assembly and established Painesville as its county seat. The act also stipulated that the construction of a county courthouse be funded by "voluntary subscription". The foundation for the new courthouse was laid later that year in Painesville. The building was not completed until 1852. A fire in 1841, dubbed the "Courthouse Disaster", destroyed the building materials for the new courthouse, delaying its construction, and was the trigger for the creation of the city's fire department.

On September 10, 2011, a spotlight that illuminates the cupola at night started a fire within the copper-plated, wooden dome. The second floor received heavy smoke and water damage in addition to the fire damage to the cupola. Restoration of City Hall from the fire was completed a year later.

== See also ==
- National Register of Historic Places in Lake County, Ohio

== Sources ==
- Craig, William P (April 25, 1971). "Painesville City Hall". National Register of Historic Places Inventory—Nomination Form. National Archives and Records Administration. NAID 71989593.
- Williams Brothers (1878). A History of Geauga and Lake Counties, Ohio. Philadelphia: J. B. Lippincott & Co.
