= Lake Erie College =

Private college in Painesville, Ohio, U.S.

- Former name: Lake Erie Female Seminary (1856–1898)
- Type: Private liberal arts college
- Established: 1856
- Academic affiliations: Council of Independent Colleges, Ohio Foundation of Independent Colleges
- President: Jennifer Schuller
- Location: Painesville, Ohio, U.S. 41°43′00″N 81°15′06″W
- Campus: Suburban, 52 acres (21 ha)
- Colors: Green and white
- Nickname: Storm
- Sporting affiliations: NCAA Division II – G-MAC
- Mascot: Stormy the Cyclone
- Website: lec.edu

Lake Erie College is a private liberal arts college in Painesville, Ohio, United States. Founded in 1856 as a female seminary, the college converted to a coeducational institution in 1985.

== History ==
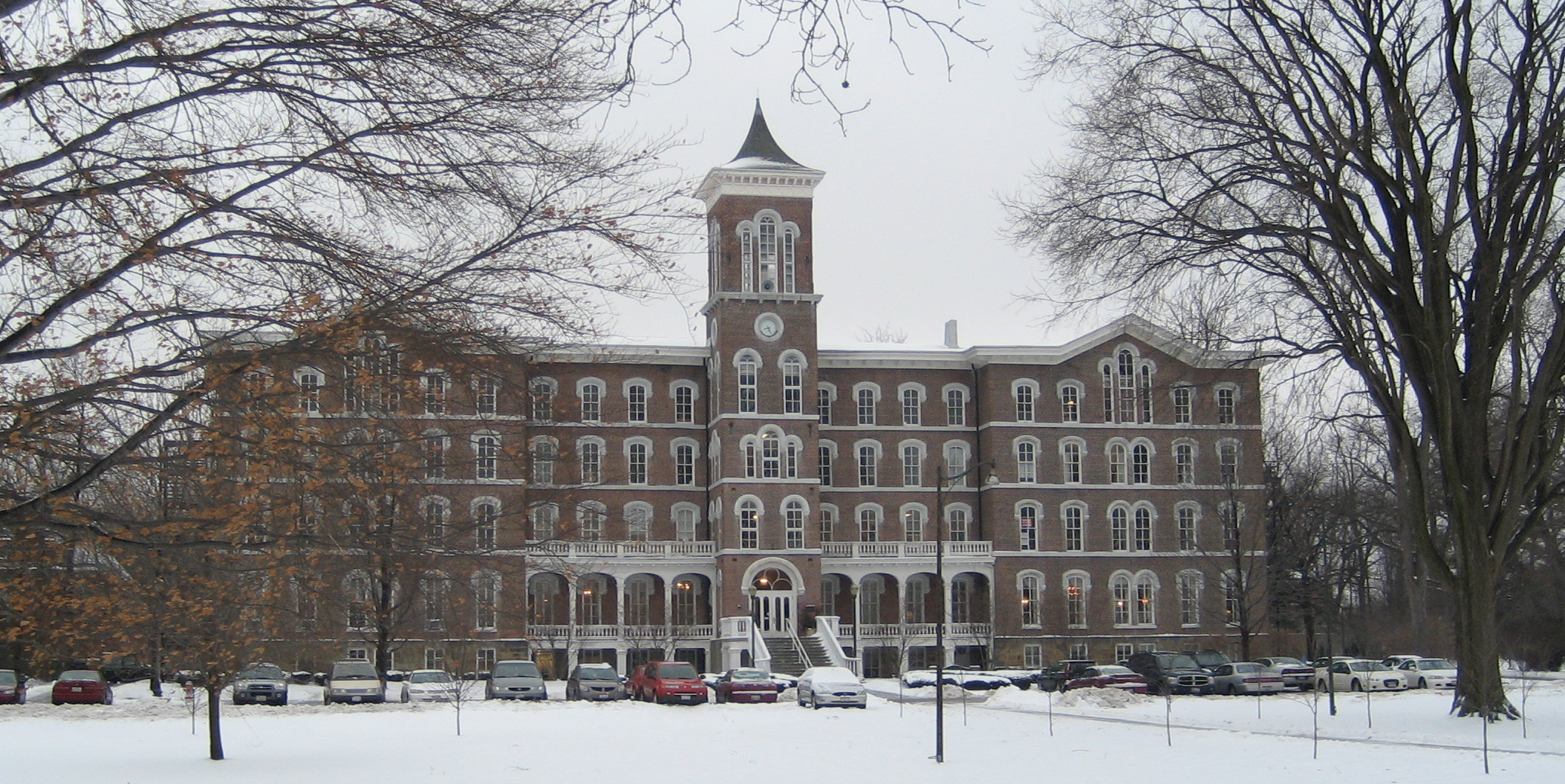
College Hall, built in 1857

The Lake Erie Female Seminary was relocated to Painesville after Willoughby Seminary, founded in 1847, burned to the ground. Its founders include prominent local citizens Timothy Rockwell, general store owner Silas Trumbull Ladd, Judge William Lee Perkins, Mayor and Judge Aaron Wilcox, Charles Austin Avery and Judge Reuben Hitchcock, a president of the Cleveland and Mahoning Railroad and cousin of Edward Hitchcock.

Scholarship was not a chief concern at the Seminary in its earliest years, however. Educating future mothers through domestic work, physical education and etiquette ranked among the Seminary's chief aims. For a tuition of $160, seminarians were trained as teachers.

The Arts took up a home in the halls of Lake Erie. Helen Rockwell Morley Memorial Music Building, opened in 1927 – its classic Greek design, Corinthian pillars, seating for more than 1,000, and four-manual E.M. Skinner organ with 4,359 pipes. The building was designed by Abram Garfield.

The Civil Aeronautics Authority approved Lake Erie for a civilian pilot program in 1939, several years after Amelia Earhart visited the campus to speak to its Aviators Club. In the 1940s, President Helen D. Bragdon, a Harvard alumna, moved the college from more Victorian ideals toward an active, responsible citizenry.

A special exhibit of Modern art signaled the opening of Royce Hall for the Fine and Performing Arts in 1970. Prints, sculpture, graphics and more by celebrated artists such as Dali, dekooning, Magritte, Miro and Picasso were on display. R. Buckminster Fuller spoke at the facility's ground-breaking.

In 1985, Lake Erie College became coeducational, merging Garfield Senior College with Lake Erie College for Women, and men were admitted officially as students.

== Academics ==
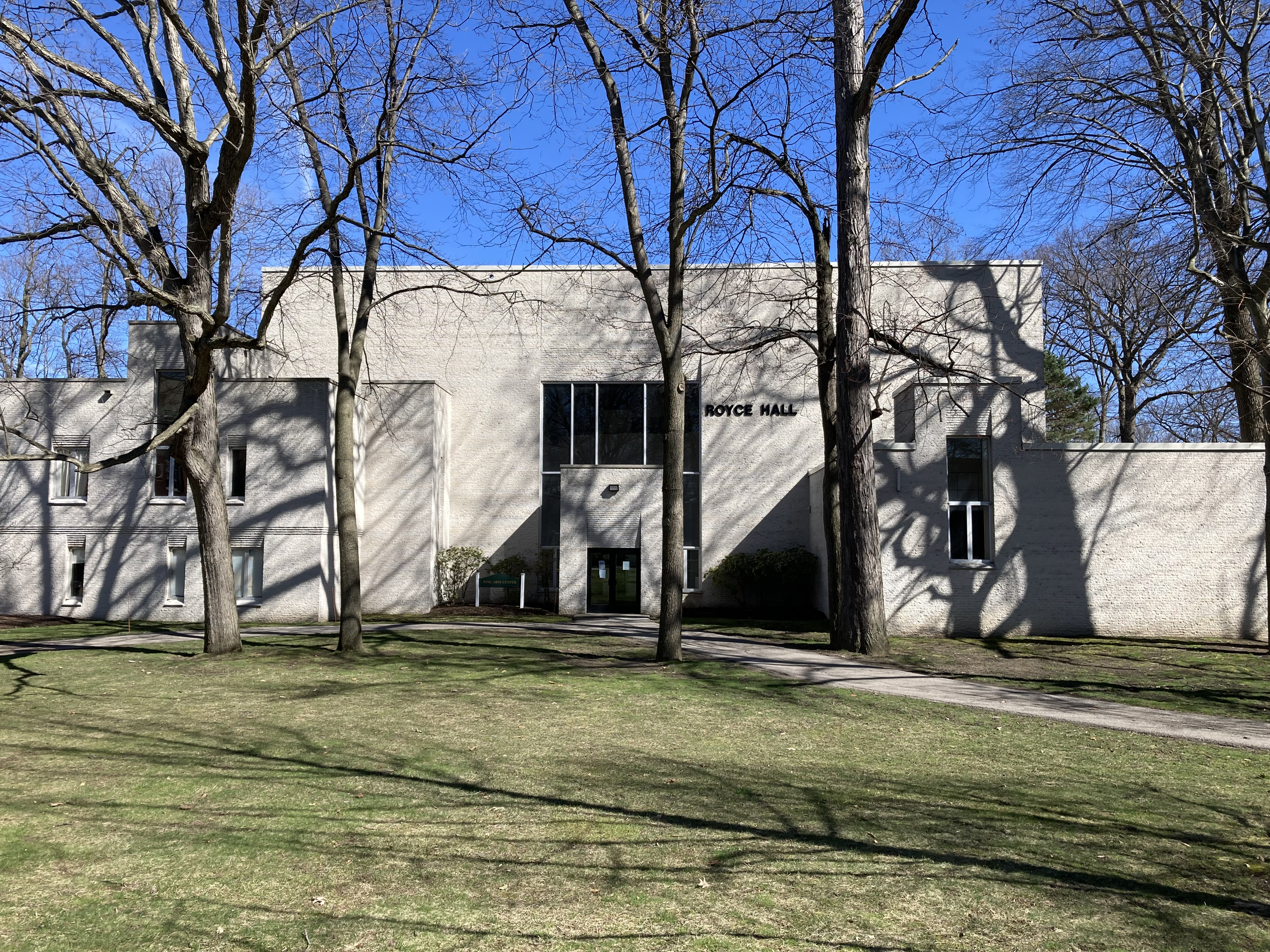
Royce Hall for the Fine and Performing Arts, built in 1970

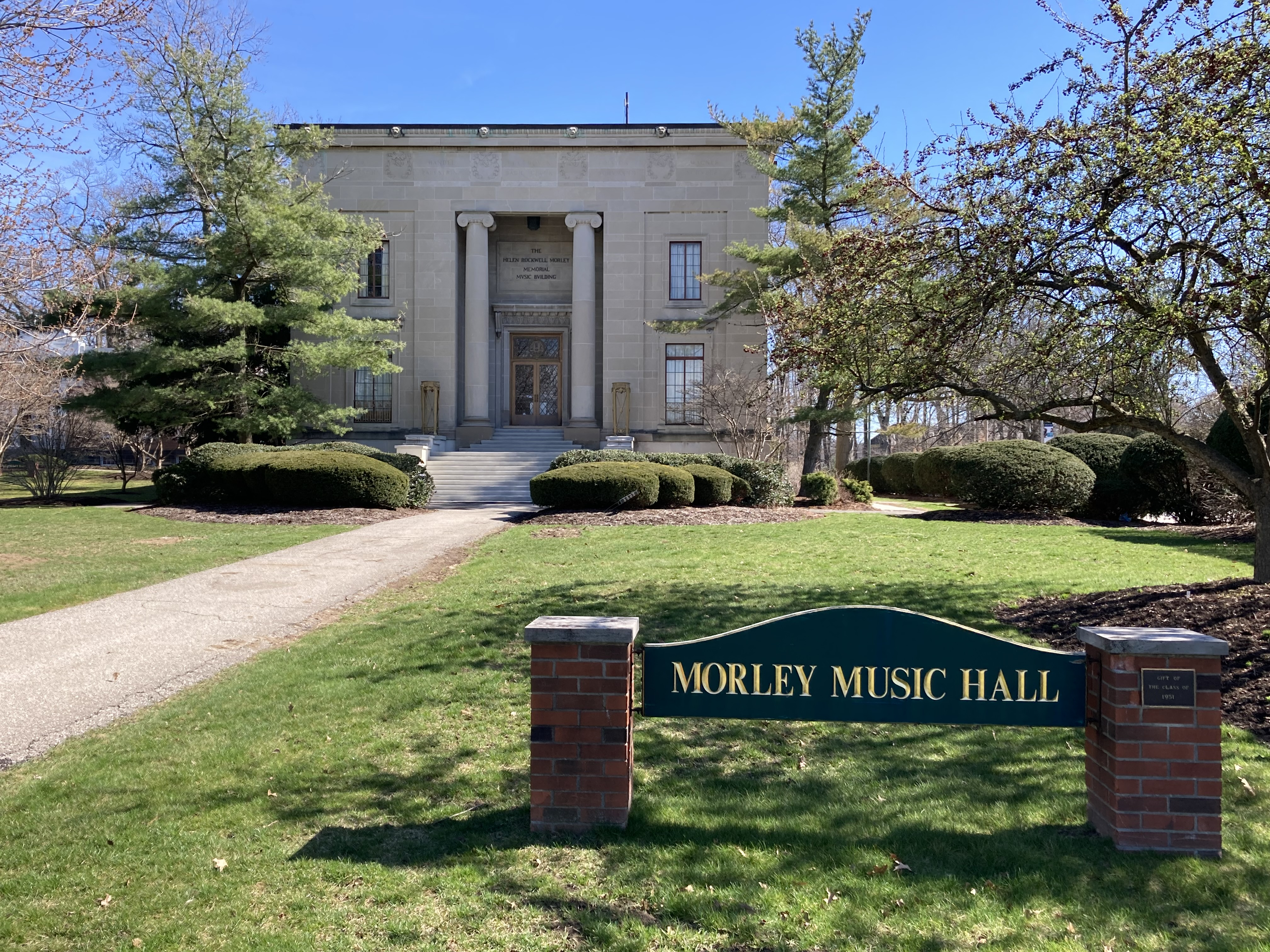
Helen Rockwell Morley Memorial Music Building, built in 1927

Lake Erie College has three academic schools: the School of Education, the School of Business and Professional Studies, and the School of STREAMS (science, technology, research, engineering, animal and medical sciences). Each maintains its own majors, minors, and programs under the direction of its respective dean. All students complete a general curriculum, called CORE, as a foundation to courses required by their major field(s) of study.

The School of Business and Professional Studies is IACBE-accredited and offers its students ten undergraduate majors and six minors. In addition to three undergraduate programs, the School of Education also offers endorsements in TESOL and reading, post-baccalaureate programming, and an M.Ed. degree.

Popular majors at the School of STREAMS include criminal justice, psychology, and English. While most major fields lead to a Bachelor of Arts degree, a Bachelor of Fine Arts degree is also offered. There are four majors in natural sciences and mathematics as well as four majors in equine studies. Equine studies at Lake Erie College began in 1955 and there have been 304 Equine Studies graduates since 2000. Minors such as gender, sexuality & women's studies, as well as comedy studies, fall outside the scope of major fields of study.

Students have access to regional land preserves due to the School's partnership with The Nature Conservancy.

== Athletics ==
The official nickname of the college's athletics teams is the Storm. This name was chosen after Lake Erie College started competing nationally, at which point they held a contest to name the team. "Contestants had to supply the name and a suitable logo and rationale for the name. A Madison woman won by suggesting the name the Storm." The name was chosen to replace the nickname Unicorns when the college added men's intercollegiate athletics beginning in 1988. Their mascot is Stormy, the storm.

Lake Erie College sponsored the first women's national collegiate tennis tournament in 1922, won by Evelyn Ennes of Sandusky, Ohio.

== Notable alumni ==
- Frances Jennings Casement, suffragist
- Joe Dolce, American-Australian singer-songwriter
- Dawn Powell, author and playwright
- Luke Raley, outfielder and first baseman for the Seattle Mariners
