= Old Lake County Courthouse (Florida) =

- U.S. National Register of Historic Places
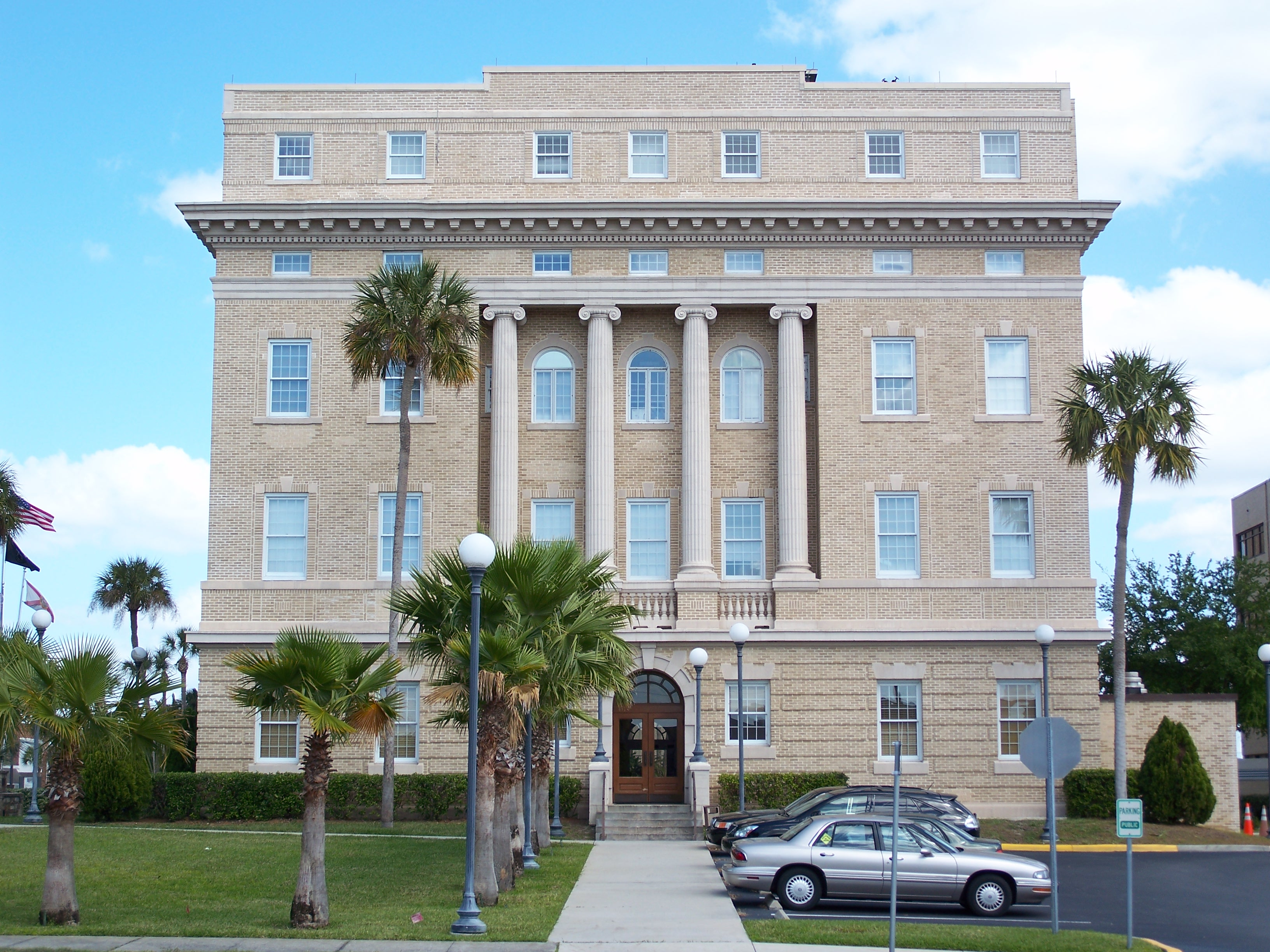

- Location within Florida Location within the United States
- Interactive map showing the location of Old Lake County Courthouse
- Location: Tavares, Florida
- Coordinates: 28°48′6″N 81°43′52″W
- Built: 1922
- Architect: Alan J. MacDonough
- Architectural style: Classical Revival
- NRHP reference No.: 98001199
- Added to NRHP: September 25, 1998

The Old Lake County Courthouse (constructed in 1922) is a historic courthouse in Tavares, Florida, located at 315 West Main Street. On September 25, 1998, it was added to the U.S. National Register of Historic Places.

The Lake County Historical Museum is located on the first floor of the courthouse. The museum's exhibits focus on the county's history and cultural heritage.
