= Frances Jennings Casement =

American suffragist and voting advocate (1840–1928)

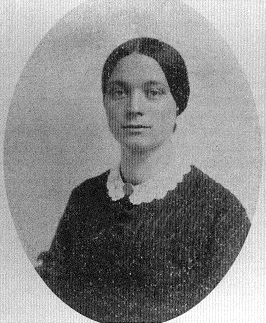
- Frances Jennings Casement, c. 1860
- Born: Frances Jennings; 1840
- Died: 1928 (aged 87–88)
- Education: Willoughby Female Seminary
- Occupation: Suffragist
- Spouse: John Stephen Casement (m. 1857)

Frances Jennings Casement (1840–1928) was an American suffragist and voting advocate from Painesville, Ohio. Her father Charles C. Jennings was a politician active in the abolition movement in the 1830s. Frances married General John S. Casement in 1857. He was elected as representative to congress and lobbied for voting rights for women.

Frances and her husband moved to Wyoming where she became friends with suffragists Susan B. Anthony and Elizabeth Cady Stanton. In 1870 they returned to Painesville, where Frances continued her campaign for women's rights. In 1883, she organized the Equal Rights Association in Painesville and in 1885 helped found Ohio Women's Suffrage Association, serving as president from 1885 to 1889.

Casement lived to see the 19th Amendment to the United States Constitution giving women equal voting rights adopted in 1920.

The Casement House in Painesville Township was added to the National Register of Historic Places in 1975.

Casement was inducted into the Ohio Women's Hall of Fame in 2001.

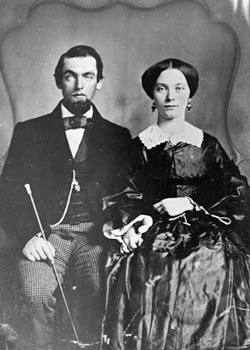
Frances Jennings Casement and her husband, John Stephen Casement
