= List of lighthouses in Ohio =

This is a list of all lighthouses in the U.S. state of Ohio.

"Historic Light Station Information and Photography: Ohio". United States Coast Guard Historian's Office. Archived from the original on May 1, 2017.

Name	Image	Location	Coordinates	Year first lit	Automated	Year deactivated	Current Lens	Focal Height
Ashtabula Harbor Light		Ashtabula	41.9186°N 80.7959°W	1905	1973	Active (Also a museum)	Optic	51 ft (16 m)
Cedar Point Light		Sandusky (Cedar Point)	41.488220°N 82.693441°W	1839 (Former); 1862 (Current)	Never	1975	Unknown	Unknown
Conneaut West Breakwater Lighthouse		Conneaut	N/A	1936	1972	Active	375mm	Unknown
Fairport Harbor West Breakwater Light (Originally: West Pierhead)		Fairport Harbor	41°46′4.30″N 81°16′52.25″W	1911 (Former); 1925 (Current)	Unknown	Active (Also a private home)	Unknown	56 ft (17 m)
Fairport Harbor East Pierhead Light		Fairport Harbor	N/A	1875	Never	1911 (Removed)	None	Unknown
Grand Lake St. Marys Lighthouse (aka: Northwood Light)		Celina	40°32′36″N 84°28′53″W	1923	1982	Active	Unknown	135 ft (41 m)
Fairport Harbor Light		Fairport Harbor	41°45′25.07″N 81°16′38.33″W	1825 (Former); 1871 (Current)	Never	1925	None	Unknown
Green Island Light		Put-in-Bay Township (Green Island)	41.6455°N 82.8675°W	1855 (Former); 1864 (Current)	1926	1939 (Now in ruins)	None	Unknown
Huron Harbor Light		Huron	41°24′16.59″N 82°32′37.65″W	1835 (Former); 1936 (Current)	1972 (Fully)	Active	375mm	80 ft (24 m)
Lorain West Breakwater Light (aka: Lorain Harbor Light)		Lorain	41°28′39.28″N 82°11′25.90″W	1836 (Former); 1917 (Current)	Never	1966	None	Unknown
Manhattan Range Front Light (aka: Manhattan Range Lights)		Toledo	N/A	1895 (Former); 1918(Current)	Unknown	Active	Unknown	40 ft (12 m)
Manhattan Rear Range Light (aka: Manhattan Range Lights)		Toledo	N/A	1895 (Former); 1918 (Current)	Unknown	Active	Unknown	86 ft (26 m)
Marblehead Light		Marblehead	41°32′11.2″N 82°42′42.2″W	1821	1958	Active	300mm	60 ft (18 m)
Port Clinton Light		Port Clinton	41.5150°N 82.9344°W	1833 (Former); 1896 (Current)	1926	Active	Fifth order Fresnel lens (Replica)	26 ft (7.9 m)
Sandusky Pierhead Light		Sandusky	N/A	1925 (Former); 1990s (Current)	Always	Active	Unknown	66 ft (20 m) (Former)
South Bass Island Light		Put-in-Bay Township (South Bass Island)	41.6290°N 82.8415°W	1897	Never	1962	None	Unknown
Toledo Harbor Light		Jerusalem Township	41°45′42″N 83°19′42″W	1904	1965	Active	300mm	72 ft (22 m)
Turtle Island Light		Toledo (Turtle Island)	41°45′09″N 83°23′28″W (Island Coordinates)	1831 (Former); 1866 (Current)	Never	1904 (Now Ruins)	None	Unknown
Vermilion Light		Vermilion	41°25′28.8″N 82°21′59.7″W	1847 (Former); 1877 (Current); 1991 (Replica)	1920	1929 (Dismantled)	Fifth order Fresnel lens (Replica)	Unknown
West Sister Island Light		Jerusalem Township	41°44′23″N 83°6′19″W (Island Coordinates)	1848	1937	Active	Unknown	Unknown
