= Toledo Harbor Light =

Lighthouse in Ohio, US

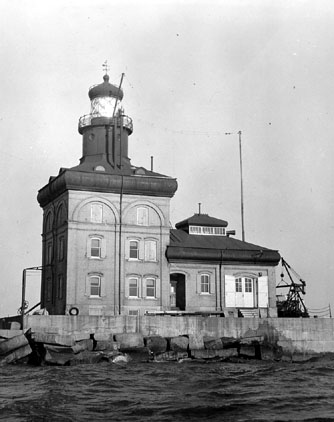
- Location: Toledo Harbor, Jerusalem Township, Lucas County, Ohio
- Coordinates: 41°45′42″N 83°19′42″W

Tower
- Constructed: 1901
- Foundation: Stone and concrete pier on crib
- Construction: Buff brick and steel three-story keeper's dwelling with attached fog signal building.
- Automated: 1965
- Height: 69 feet (21 m)
- Shape: Frustum of a cone on top of square Romanesque dwelling with attached fog signal building
- Markings: natural, black roof, lantern and parapet
- Heritage: National Register of Historic Places listed place
- Fog signal: 1 blast every 30 s (3 s bl) (Apr–Dec)

Light
- First lit: 1904
- Focal height: 72 feet (22 m)
- Lens: 3½-order Fresnel lens (1904)
- Range: 10 nautical miles (19 km; 12 mi)
- Characteristic: isophase W 6 s
- Toledo Harbor Light
- U.S. National Register of Historic Places
- Area: 0.3 acres (0.12 ha)
- Architectural style: Romanesque
- MPS: U.S. Coast Guard Lighthouses and Light Stations on the Great Lakes TR
- NRHP reference No.: 83002005
- Added to NRHP: August 4, 1983

The Toledo Harbor Lighthouse is a lighthouse in Lake Erie near Toledo, Ohio, in the United States. The light replaced the 1837 lighthouse on Turtle Island at the mouth of the Maumee River. It is an active aid to navigation.

The lighthouse is built on a 20-foot-deep (6 m) stone crib, 8.4 miles (13.5 km) from the mouth of the Maumee River, marking the entrance to the Toledo harbor. It sits about 7 miles (11 km) north of Maumee Bay State Park.

The need for a lighthouse became apparent after the shipping channel was widened and deepened in 1897 and shipping traffic increased. Construction began in 1901 when the United States Army Corps of Engineers sunk a large crib, filled it with stone, and then topped the portion above water with a concrete base to create an artificial island.

Crib construction had been perfected on the Great Lakes on such earlier lights as White Shoal Light, Stannard Rock Light, and Rock of Ages Light, which was developed by Engineer Col. Orlando M. Poe.

The tip of the lantern vent is 85 feet (26 m) high above the lake. It has a three-story dwelling and is brick with a steel frame. Its Romanesque style is unique among Great Lakes lighthouses. Built for $152,000, almost as much as Spectacle Reef Light, the most expensive lighthouse on the Great Lakes. The Toledo light was first illuminated on May 23, 1904, by a 3½-order Fresnel lens that featured a 180-degree bull's-eye, two smaller 60-degree bull's-eyes and a ruby-red half cylinder glass made in Paris by Barbier and Bernard.

The engineers next put steel frames in place, providing stability for a three-story brick lighthouse and an attached one-story fog signal building. The dwelling was designed to accommodate one lighthouse keeper and two assistants. It rises 69 feet (21 m). A cylindrical tower has a diameter of 13 feet, upward from the center of the dwelling roof. The lantern room measures 8.5 feet (2.6 m) in diameter. Helical bars support the glass panes in the onion-domed topped lantern room. The lantern room originally housed an unusual 3½-order Fresnel lens manufactured by Barbier & Benard of Paris. The lens featured a 180-degree bull's-eye, two smaller 60-degree bull's-eyes, and a ruby-red half cylinder of glass, and when revolved produced two white flashes followed by a single red flash. A suspended weight was used to rotate the lens, which first sent forth its penetrating beams of light on the night of May 23, 1904.

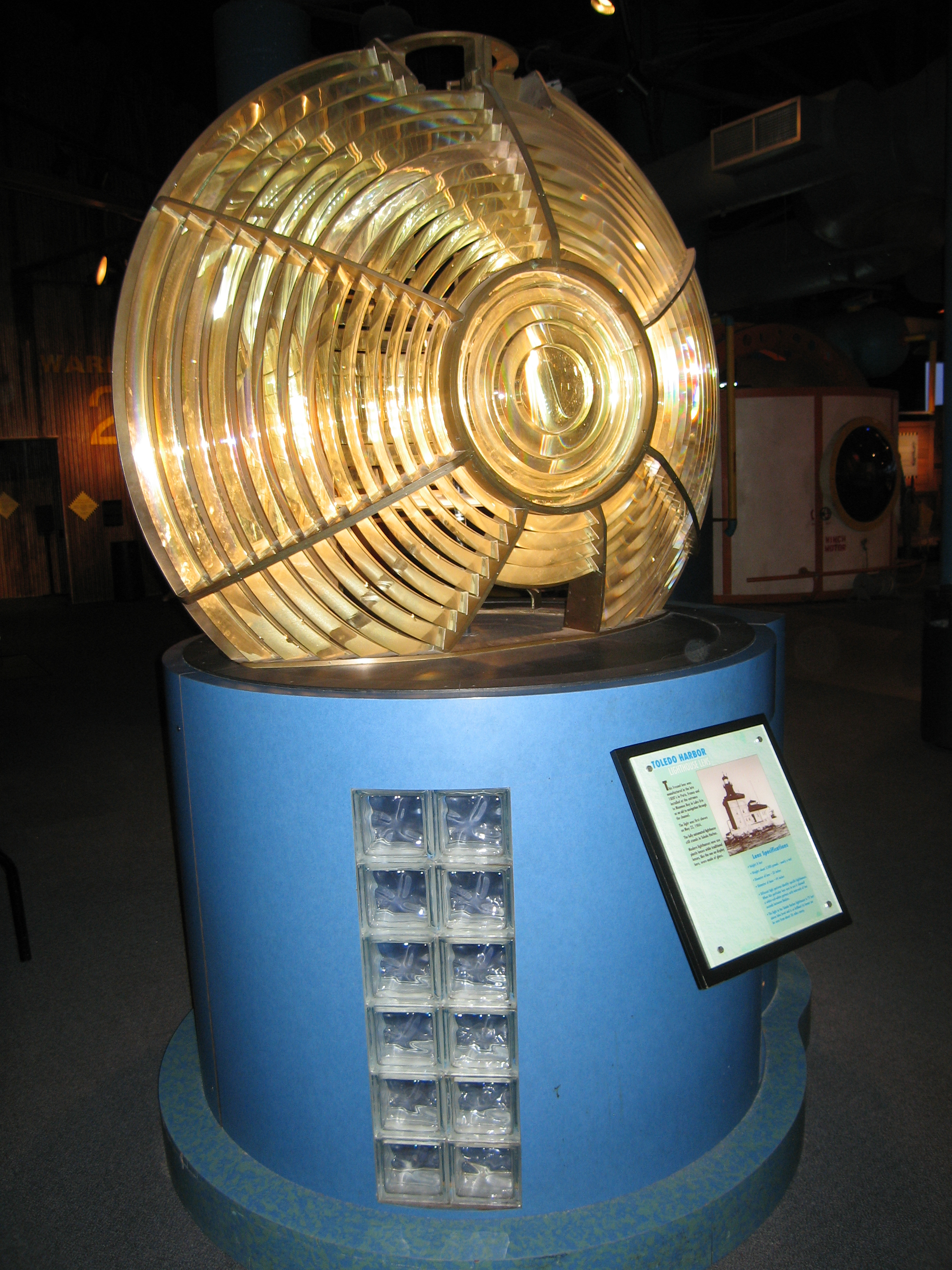
The lighthouse's original Fresnel lens on display at Maumee Bay State Park Lodge

By 1966, human keepers were replaced by an electric motor to rotate the lens. The lighthouse was fortified to protect it from vandalism in the absence of lighthouse keepers. One part of the security system was fully uniformed mannequin placed in an upper window. His manner or dress, facial hair and wigs was varied. This gave rise to an urban legend that the facility was haunted and the figure beckoning. It has been reported that the mannequin became "part of the Coast Guard's tradition" so new Toledo-stationed officers sign its shirt as an initiation ritual.

Toledo Harbor Lighthouse is still an active aid to navigation. The federal government maintained ownership of the site until 2006, and the US Coast Guard still maintains the navigational light. The Toledo Harbor Lighthouse Society, with help from Duket Architects, filed an application to own the lighthouse on September 20, 2005. On October 5, 2006, the Secretary of the Interior approved the Toledo Harbor Lighthouse Preservation Society application for ownership. The lighthouse is open to the public for special events. In the late 1990s, the original Fresnel lens was removed and eventually placed on display at the COSI museum in Toledo. In its place is a 12 inches (300 mm) lens, powered by solar cells. U.S. Coast Guardsmen regularly visit the lighthouse to clean and service the lens, solar panel and backup batteries.

In 1965, the light was automated by the U.S. Coast Guard and powered by solar cells. To deter vandalism, a uniformed mannequin officer was placed in the window and the boat basin removed.

As part of the commemoration of the light's centennial, the Toledo Harbor Lighthouse Society was formed in 2003 as a nonprofit organization to document the history of the lighthouse, preserve the lighthouse and to provide public access. The Toledo Harbor Lighthouse Preservation Society was formed to work for restoration of the lighthouse. Restoration will cost approximately $1.5 million. A grant was awarded in 2010 for windows, doors, shutters and tucking the brick. A 'My Lighthouse Window' capital campaign for the $138,000 match is underway. The infrastructure will include solar, a marine waste water system and a gray water treatment process. Potable water will be boated in. When the restoration is complete, four 'keepers' will stay at the lighthouse to schedule visits to tour the lighthouse.

The light's unique form made it the subject of artwork, including paintings.

In 2008, the Fresnel lens was relocated to Quilter Lodge in Maumee Bay State Park, which is within sight of the Toledo Harbor Lighthouse on clear days.

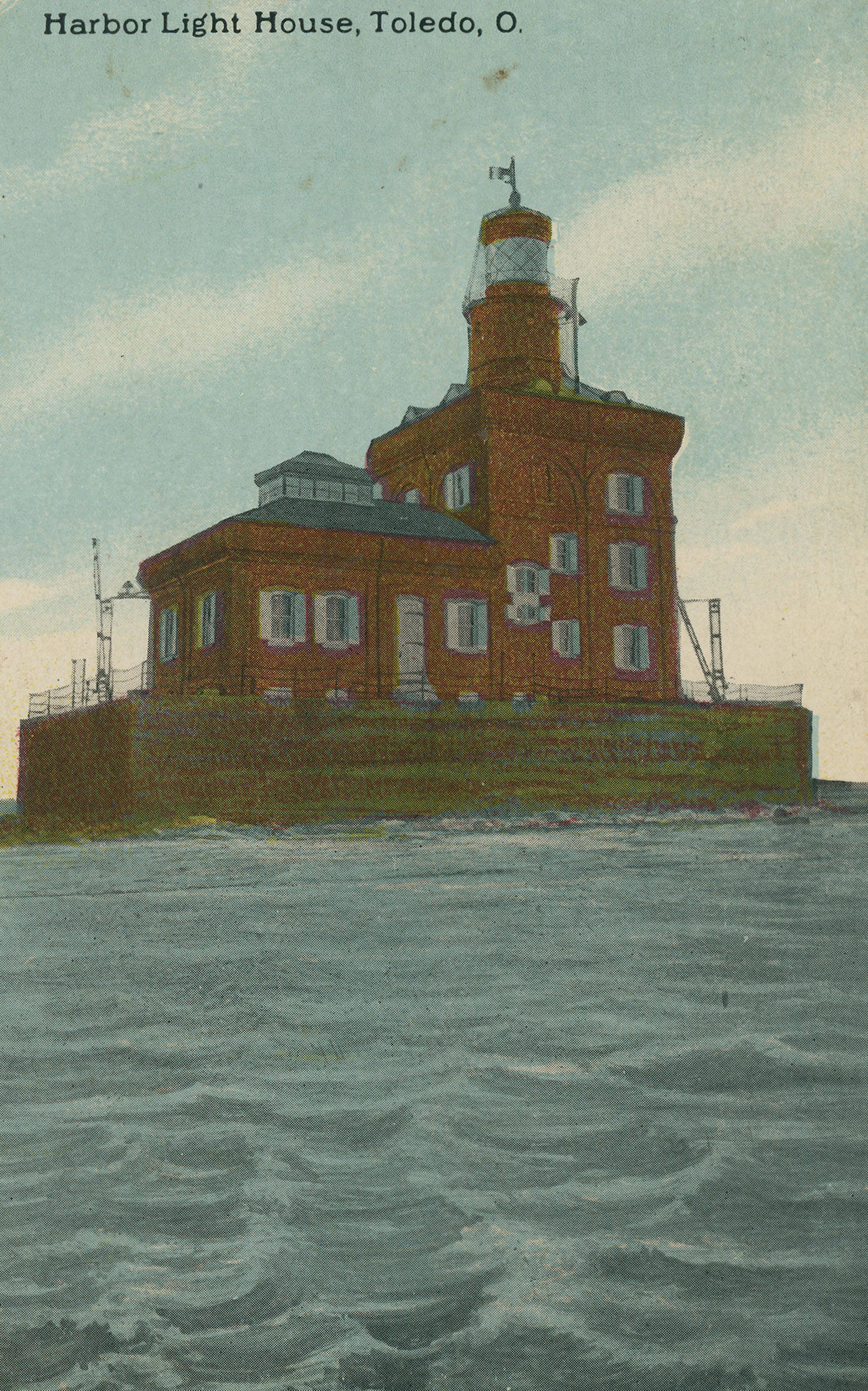
Toledo Harbor Light House, 1914

It is listed on the National Register of Historic Places, Reference #83002005, name of Listing: TOLEDO HARBOR LIGHT (U.S. COAST GUARD/GREAT LAKES TR). It is not on the state list.
