= Alpena Light =

Lighthouse in Michigan, United States

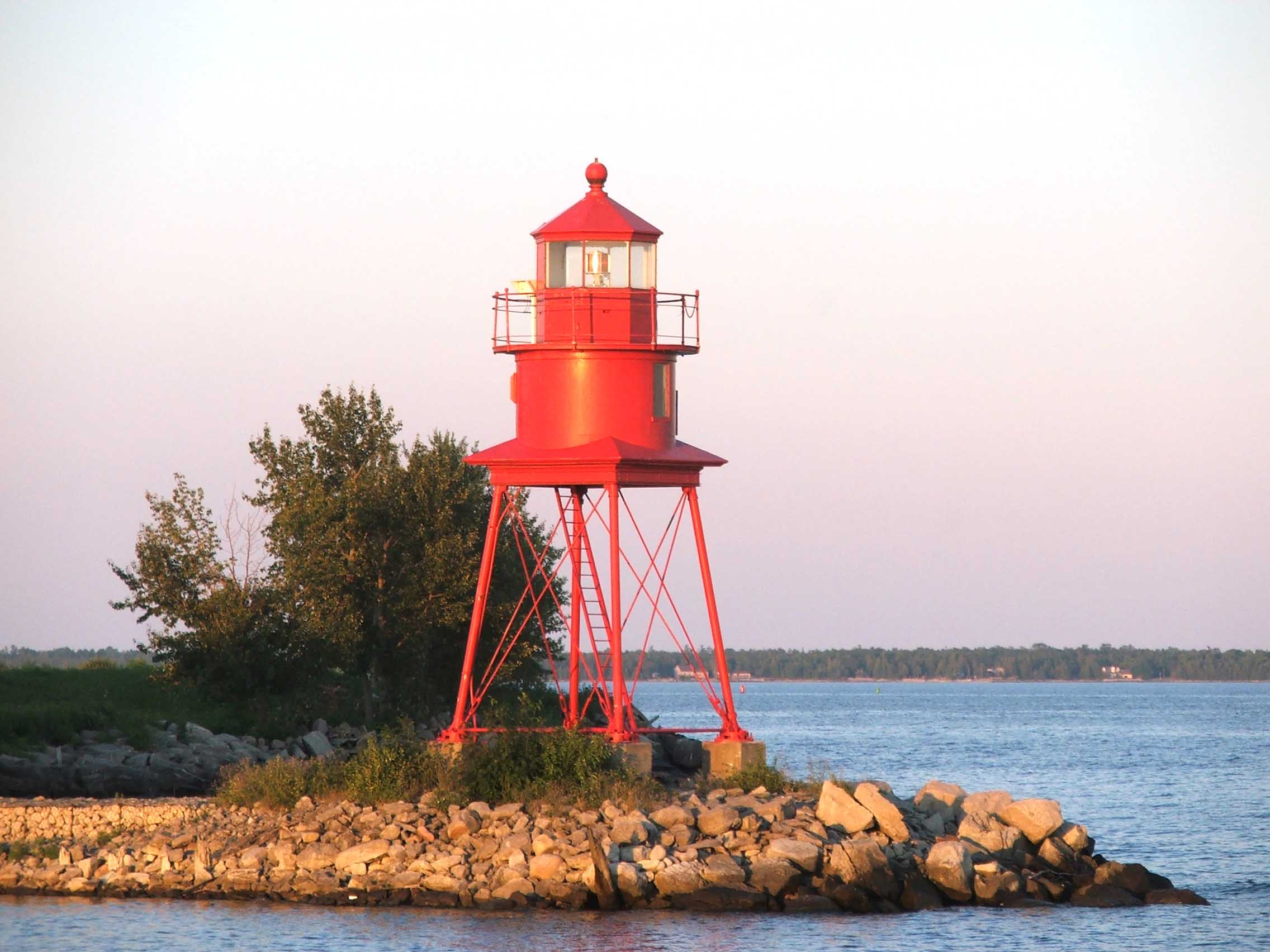
- Location: End of N breakwater at Thunder Bay River mouth, 150 ft. from shore, Alpena, Michigan
- Coordinates: 45°3′37.5″N 83°25′22.44″W

Tower
- Constructed: 1914
- Foundation: Breakwater
- Construction: Cast iron
- Height: 34 feet (10 m)
- Shape: four-legged pyramid skeleton tower
- Markings: Red Daymark with upper part enclosed
- Heritage: National Register of Historic Places listed place
- Fog signal: HORN: 1 blast ev 15s (2s bl). Operates May 1 to Oct. 20.

Light
- First lit: 1914
- Focal height: 42 feet (13 m)
- Lens: Fourth order Fresnel lens (original), 9.8-inch (250 mm) Tideland Signal acrylic optic (current)
- Range: 12 nautical miles (22 km; 14 mi)
- Characteristic: Fl R 5 secs
- Alpena Light
- U.S. National Register of Historic Places
- Area: less than one acre
- Architect: US Lighthouse Service
- MPS: Light Stations of the United States MPS
- NRHP reference No.: 06000197
- Added to NRHP: March 29, 2006

The Alpena Light, also known as the Thunder Bay River Lighthouse or Alpena Breakwater Light, is a lighthouse on Lake Huron near Alpena, Michigan. Standing on the north breakwater of Alpena Harbor, the light marks the entrance to the Thunder Bay River from Thunder Bay. The current lighthouse, built in 1914, replaced earlier wooden structures which had been in use since 1877 and 1888. The current light is a weather-protected structure on a steel frame. It was added to the National Register of Historic Places in 2006, and the state inventory list the same year.

== History and description ==
The history of the Alpena Lights closely follows the history of the local timber industry. Shipping in and out of the Thunder Bay River has historically concentrated on logs, cut lumber, and rolls of paper and newsprint. The first petition for a lighthouse at the mouth of the Thunder Bay River, from a consortium of men active in the local lumber industry, came in 1857. Other pleas followed.

Congress partly responded to these appeals in 1867 with an appropriation of $10,000 to build a light at nearby Trowbridge Point. After further appeals directly to the United States Lighthouse Board, the Board advised Congress to move the location of the prospective light to the mouth of the Thunder Bay River. This recommendation was a key element in the final location of the Alpena Light. Congress approved the recommendation in 1868.

=== First and second lights ===
In August 1875, the first Alpena Light was established as a temporary 25-foot (7.6 m)-tall "pole light" approximately ten miles off shore.

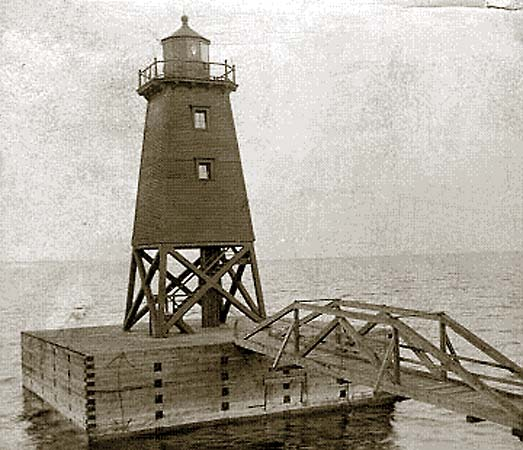
The 1877 light before being destroyed by fire

In 1877, a second light was built from a timber design of Major Godfrey Weitzel. It was a brown wooden pyramidal tower, complete with a Sixth Order Fresnel lens. In July 1888 it burned with much of the town. After it burnt, keeper E.G. Howard—who had managed to save the keeper's house from the conflagration—again put up a temporary pole with a light. The original fog bell from the "1870 light" [sic] is on display at the Huron Lights Museum north of town.

=== Current (third) light ===
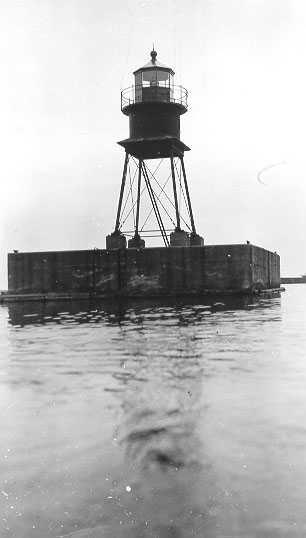
The rebuilt 1914 light on its original crib base

The current Alpena Light (1914), the third light of that name, is thought to be the only lighthouse of this type in the U.S. Russ Rowlett, who maintains the online Lighthouse Directory, flatly states that: "this tower is the only surviving example of its design." However, the structure of this light is similar in concept to Lake Superior's Chequamegon Point Light. There are also skeletal towers of various other designs in the western Great Lakes.

Originally painted black, its daymark function was enhanced in 1950 by painting it bright red.

The current lens was installed circa 1996. The original Fresnel lens is presently located at the Grand Traverse Lighthouse.

From 1878 to 1965 there were five lighthouse keepers at this location.

The Alpena Light fog horn has gone through different iterations. In 1891, there was a fog bell with an automated striking mechanism, which was upgraded in 1920 to an electric alarm, and in 1932 to the current modern automated fog horn.

The Alpena Light onshore complex once included a brick oil storage building, built in 1896; it was removed after the light's electrification. The light was automated in 1974.

The current Alpena Light is 34 feet (10 m) tall; references in some sources to this light being "80 feet (24 m) tall" are factually incorrect. Compare the U.S. Coast Guard Light List, the Terry Pepper Seeing the Light database of heights, and the Lighthouse Directory.

== Getting there ==
The Alpena Light is best viewed from the transient docks at the City of Alpena’s marina. It has been variously called "Sputnik" and "Little Red" by locals. Others are dismissive, opining that it is "Long on duty, short on beauty." Another colorful local phrase is, "Don't kick the can." The light marks the Alpena harbor of refuge and is located just east of downtown Alpena.

== The light today ==
Over the years, this light has been a source of civic pride, and has been the subject of many postcards. The Great Lakes lighthouse festival is centered in Alpena in the second weekend of each October, and this light was used in 1999 as a pictorial cancellation of stamps celebrating the event. Passing freighters in the river come very close to the light.

As of 2010, the Alpena Light is an active aid to navigation.

In June 2011, the General Services Administration made the Alpena Light (along with 11 others) available at no cost to public organizations willing to preserve them.

== Replica ==
A scaled down replica of this light was built on Lake Havasu at Lake Havasu City, Arizona. The replica is in Mohave County, Arizona, was sponsored by the County Board of Supervisors, and was built by members of the Lake Havasu Lighthouse Club. It was dedicated on November 5, 2006, and is at GPS:3 4° 26.99' N - 114° 22.38' W. It is on the western tip of Havasu Island, and has a red light that flashes sixty times per minute.

== See also ==
- List of lighthouses in the United States
- Thunder Bay National Marine Sanctuary
