= Stannard Rock Light =

Lighthouse in Michigan, United States

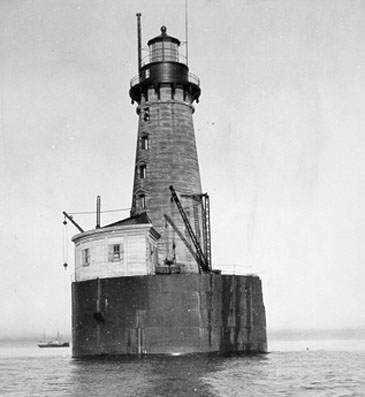
- Location: Off Keweenaw Peninsula in Lake Superior
- Coordinates: 47°11′0.62″N 87°13′30.42″W

Tower
- Constructed: 1883
- Foundation: Crib
- Construction: Dressed stone, Monolithic limestone/iron bolts.
- Automated: 1962
- Height: 100 feet (30 m)
- Shape: Frustum of a cone tower on cylindrical crib
- Markings: Natural with black lantern
- Heritage: National Register of Historic Places listed place
- Fog signal: Air diaphone (originally steam whistle)

Light
- First lit: 1883
- Focal height: 102 feet (31 m)
- Lens: – 3rd-order Fresnel lens (original), solar powered 12-inch (300 mm) Tideland Signal ML-300 acrylic lens (current)
- Intensity: 3,000 candlepower
- Range: 18 nautical miles (33 km; 21 mi)
- Characteristic: Flashing, white, 6 sec
- Stannard Rock Lighthouse
- U.S. National Register of Historic Places
- Michigan State Historic Site
- Area: less than one acre
- Architect: US Lighthouse Board: Major Godfrey Weitzel
- Architectural style: limestone monolith
- NRHP reference No.: 73000953
- Added to NRHP: March 30, 1973

The Stannard Rock Light is a lighthouse located on a reef that was the most serious hazard to navigation on Lake Superior. The exposed crib of the Stannard Rock Light is rated as one of the top ten engineering feats in the United States. It is 24 miles (39 km) from the nearest land, making it the most distant (from shore) lighthouse in the United States. It was one of the "stag stations", manned only by men, and had the nickname "The Loneliest Place in the World".

The lighthouse was automated in 1962 and the United States Coast Guard still maintains it as an active aid to navigation. It is closed to the public and can only be viewed by boat or airplane. It was listed on the National Register of Historic Places in 1971.

== Stannard Rock Reef ==
The Stannard Rock Reef is located off Keweenaw Peninsula about 24 miles (39 km) south of Manitou Island and 44 miles (71 km) north of Marquette, Michigan. In 1835, Captain Charles C. Stannard of the vessel John Jacob Astor first discovered this underwater mountain that extends for 0.25 miles (0.40 km) with depths as shallow as 4 feet (1.2 m) and averaging 16 feet (4.9 m). This reef was the most serious danger to navigation on Lake Superior and it was first marked by a day beacon in 1868, at which time tests were undertaken to determine if a light could survive in this harsh location, "atop a mile long reef" more than 50 miles northwest of Marquette. A temporary marker was placed at the location in 1866. The opening of the Soo Locks and the rapid increase in commerce between Duluth, Minnesota, and the lower Great Lakes demanded construction of a lighthouse. The lighthouse was named for Captain Stannard. The Stannard Rock Light is 24 miles (39 km) from the nearest land making it the most distant from shore of any lighthouse in the United States. Stannard Rock Reef provides a year-round structure for a superior lake trout fishery. Michigan's state record for lake trout, a 61-pound-8-ounce (27.9 kg) specimen, was caught on 12-pound (5.4 kg) line at Stannard Rock Reef by 16-year-old Lucas Lanczy on August 17, 1997.

== Construction ==
Orlando Metcalfe Poe of the Lighthouse Board solved the logistics problem of constructing a lighthouse on the remote Stannard Rock by using the same process and all the apparatus and machinery used to build the tower and permanent protective crib of the Spectacle Reef Light on Lake Huron. The machinery included a steam and pulley operated cement mixer and a steam powered planing machine used to shape timbers.

The brief season for work on the remote reef in Lake Superior lasted from May to October with many days lost to inclement weather. All of the machinery used to construct the Spectacle Reef Light was moved to the depot at Huron Bay on Lake Superior for construction of the crib for the Stannard Rock Light, which began in July 1877. Blocks of stone were cut at Marblehead, Ohio and shipped to the site for construction of the tower. The crib was taken out to Stannard Rock in August 1877, and soundings were made for fitting the crib to the reef. The crib was then returned to Huron Bay and built up to 14 courses; it was returned to Stannard Rock in August 1878 and placed in position on the reef. By October 1878 the crib was filled with concrete and stone from a quarry opened on Huron Island. By June 1879 an iron pier had been built up to the surface of the water. By mid-1880 the structure was 14 feet (4.3 m) above the water. The tower was completed and the first light was exhibited on July 4, 1882. Work on the tower continued until 1883. It took five years to complete the construction of the Stannard Rock Light at the cost of $305,000, (just $5,000 more than the original estimate) 126 tons of iron, 76 tons of brick, 1,270 tons of tower stone, and 7,276 tons of concrete were used in the lighthouse's construction. The exposed crib of the Stannard Rock Light is rated by the National Park Service as one of top ten engineering feats in the United States.

It is said to be the farthest offshore of any lighthouse in the United States. "This is probably the most exposed of all Great Lakes lighthouses."

The light output varied from 156,000 to 248,000 candlepower over many years.

== Lighthouse service ==
In early winter Lake Superior's waves splashing against the stone tower of the Stannard Rock Light built a layer of ice that forced maintenance crews to hack away the ice around the door to reach the men. If an illness, accident, or fire occurred at the Stannard Rock Light it could be days or even weeks before the keepers got assistance. As one of the rock lighthouses, it was designated as a "stag station" where only men could serve. The keepers called the Stannard Rock Light the "Loneliest Place in the World" and it has always carried the distinction of being the "loneliest place" in the continental United States. Maritime historian Wes Oleszewski reported that duty at the Stannard Rock Light was so rough that of the keepers and assistant keepers, there were four resignations and three transfers in the first three seasons of the station's operation.

The lighthouse keepers were taken off the Stannard Rock at the close of shipping season in early December. The towers were locked until the keepers returned in March for the start of the shipping season. Landing at the Stannard Rock Light was difficult, but often the more serious problem at the start of the season was the need to take sledgehammers and pickaxes to clear away layers of thick ice (1 to 2 feet (0.30 to 0.61 m) deep) on the entry door, lantern, and foghorns.

The Stannard Rock Light keepers operated the lantern and the living quarters with flammable illuminants for 60 years; the lighthouse was not electrified until after World War II. By this time, lighthouses around the country were gradually being automated. On June 18, 1961, Stannard Rock Light was in the process of being converted to automation when gasoline and propane tanks used to fuel the station plant suddenly exploded and destroyed the buildings on the pier and severely damaged the interior of the tower. The explosion killed one keeper and left three others stranded on the concrete pier at the base of the tower for three days before the men were rescued by the Coast Guard tender Woodrush.

After the accident, the Coast Guard repaired the fire damage and continued with the automation of the lighthouse which was completed in 1962. The 1,400,000 candlepower light was replaced with a 3,000 candlepower light. The Coast Guard carefully disassembled the 2nd-order, 12 bulls-eyed Fresnel lens, hauled it down 141 tower stairs, packed it in six wooden crates, and then lowered the crates by block and tackle 80 feet (24 m) down to the crib for shipment. After a protracted search, the Fresnel lens was found 37 years later at the Coast Guard Academy's storage warehouse in New London, Connecticut. The base unit for the lens was relocated from the tower to the museum in 2000. The lens is now on display at the Marquette Maritime Museum. See, Marquette Harbor Light.

== Double mission and current status ==
The Stannard Rock Light continues to be operated and maintained by the Coast Guard as an active aid to navigation. The lighthouse can only be viewed by airplane or boat and it is closed to the public. In 2008, after more than a century of warning mariners away from the treacherous reef, the lighthouse was given a second mission, when scientists placed equipment atop the tower to measure increased evaporation as a possible cause of receding water levels in the Great Lakes.

Boat trips out to the lighthouse are available, although visitors are not allowed to enter it.

A team of amateur radio (ham) operators “activated” Stannard Rock Lighthouse as “W8L” during the U.S. National Lighthouse-Lightship Weekend, August 7–8, 2021.
