= Turtle Island Light =

Lighthouse in Ohio, US

- Location: Turtle Island (Lake Erie)
- Coordinates: 41°45′09″N 83°23′30″W

Tower
- Constructed: 1831; 1866 (current tower)
- Construction: Brick
- Automated: No
- Height: 44 feet (13 m)
- Shape: Square

Light
- First lit: 1866
- Deactivated: 1904
- Lens: removed
- Range: 12 nautical miles; 23 kilometres (14 mi)

Turtle Island Light is a deactivated lighthouse located on Turtle Island in Lake Erie. The small island is divided between the U.S. states of Michigan and Ohio, with the abandoned lighthouse structure located within Ohio.

When Turtle Island fell back to federal ownership, the newly established Port of Toledo received $5,000 of federal funding from the United States Congress to build the lighthouse in 1831. At the time, the island's area was approximately 6.67 acres (2.70 ha), and the island included the lighthouse, the lighthouse keeper's residence, and a small farm.

Unlike most islands in Lake Erie, Turtle Island consists primarily of clay and gravel deposits and was subjected to constant erosion, which is why some believed it to not be a real island. By 1839, lake storms and waves reduced the island by approximately 77% down to an area of only 1.5 acres (0.61 ha). Congress spent tens of thousands of dollars to no avail to prevent the erosion of the island. In 1866, an updated lighthouse costing $12,000 was constructed. It was described as one of the finest lighthouses on the Great Lakes, and its light could be seen up to 14 miles (23 km) away. However, the erosion of the island continued to threaten the lighthouse to the point where a 4-foot (1.2 m) tall concrete wall was constructed in 1883 around the lighthouse to prevent crashing waves and erosion from damaging the structure. Constant lake storms bombarded the tiny island. When the nearby Toledo Harbor Light was completed in 1904, the Turtle Island Lighthouse was no longer needed and was decommissioned. During those 72 years, there were no shipwrecks within the vicinity of Turtle Island.

There were two keepers of the lighthouse: Ann Edson (1869–1870) and William Haynes (1875–1904).
