= Finnish Heritage Museum =

Museum of Finnish culture and heritage in Ohio

Coordinates: 41°45′20″N 81°16′38″W

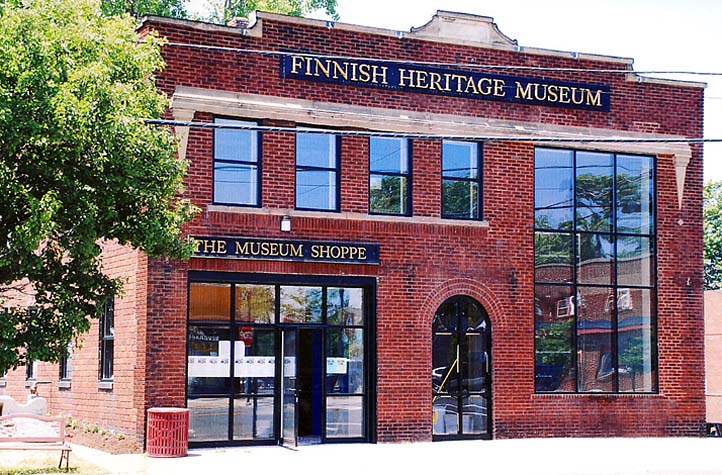
- The Finnish Heritage Museum, on High Street.
- Location: Fairport Harbor, Ohio

The Finnish Heritage Museum of Fairport Harbor, Ohio, United States is an incorporated non-profit organization founded to preserve and perpetuate Finnish heritage and cultural traditions.

== Overview ==
The museum's primary interest is the further education of its membership and the public at large in matters of Finnish heritage and culture. Museum staff archive Finnish and Finnish-American history through collection, preservation, and exhibition of special books, documents, records and artifacts. Such items are acquired, or documented, for their value in Finnish and Finnish-American history, biography, genealogy, commerce and folklore.

The museum recently acquired the building that once served as the town hall, police department and fire station. Work to renovate the building, which was suffering from structural deficiencies and other problems, began in the fall of 2006. The museum opened on June 30, 2007.
