= Godfrey Weitzel =

Union Army general

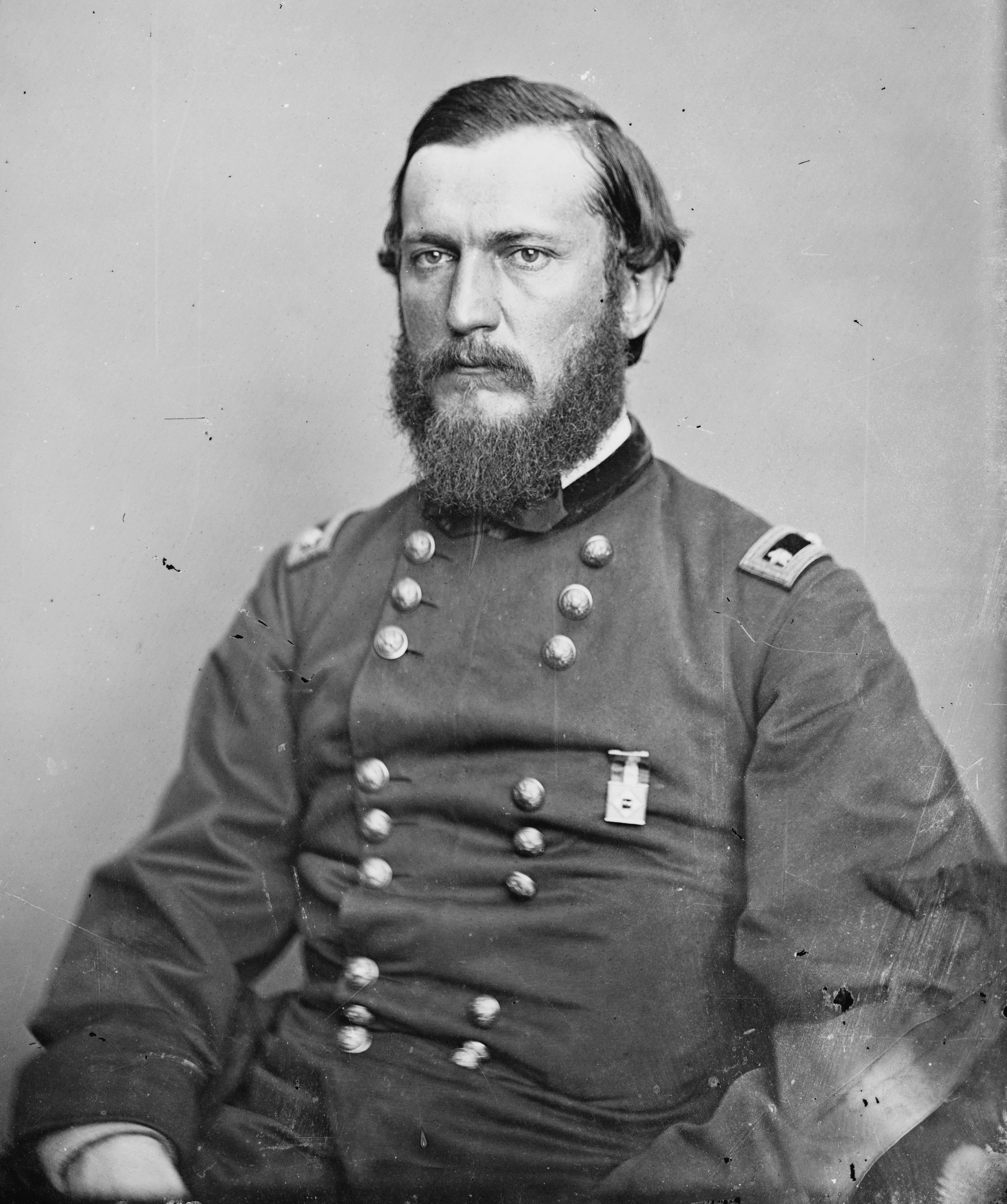
- Born: November 1, 1835; Winzeln, Bavaria (now Winzeln, Pirmasens, Germany)
- Died: March 19, 1884 (aged 48); Philadelphia, Pennsylvania
- Burial place: Spring Grove Cemetery, Cincinnati, Ohio
- Military career
- Allegiance: United States of America; Union
- Branch: United States Army; Union Army
- Service years: 1855–1884
- Rank: Major General
- Commands: XVIII Corps; XXV Corps
- Conflicts: American Civil War

Godfrey (Gottfried) Weitzel (November 1, 1835 – March 19, 1884) was a German-American major general in the Union army during the American Civil War. He was the acting Mayor of New Orleans during the Union occupation of the city and also captured and occupied the Confederate capitol, Richmond, Virginia. Weitzel is also known for his post-war accomplishments with the U.S. Army Corps of Engineers in designing and constructing internal improvements, particularly along the Ohio River and the Great Lakes region.

== Early and family life ==
Gottfried Weitzel was born in Winzeln, near Pirmasens in the Palatinate, which was then part of the Kingdom of Bavaria. His father, Ludwig, had served in the Bavarian military, and wanted to emigrate to America like his brother Wilhelm, in search of a better life. When his wife, the former Susanna Krummel, became pregnant with what turned out to be a second son, the family immigrated to the United States. They settled in Cincinnati, Ohio in 1837, where Ludwig changed his name to Lewis and his two-year-old son's to Godfrey, perhaps to avoid prejudice against German immigrants, or to Americanize the family. Lewis Weitzel operated a grocery store in the Tenth Ward, which included the "Over-the-Rhine" neighborhood with many Germanic immigrants, and also became involved in Democratic party politics. In 1853, Lewis Weitzel became a city commissioner (serving for three years) and also served on the local school board, whose chairman was lawyer and former U.S. Congressman Bellamy Storer.

Educated with his younger brother (Lewis Jr.) in the city schools (including the new "central" high school in the basement of the German Lutheran Church on Walnut below Ninth), Godfrey finished at the top of his class. Storer offered to pay for the boy's college tuition, but then with the help of publisher Heinrich Roedter contacted congressman David Tiernan Disney and managed to secure an appointment to the United States Military Academy, although the process started when Godfrey was just 14 (the minimum entrance age was 16) and the tall youth arrived in West Point, New York months after his 15th birthday.

There, Godfrey was nicknamed "Dutch" and continued to excel academically, demonstrating proficiency in mathematics and engineering. His roommates included Cyrus Comstock (who became a lifelong friend), and future Louisiana governor Francis T. Nicholls of Donaldsonville, Louisiana. When Weitzel was a sophomore, Captain Henry Brewerton was replaced as superintendent by Colonel Robert E. Lee, who took an interest in the top student, but was reassigned himself in March 1855, shortly before Weitzel's class graduated. Nonetheless, Weitzel graduated 2nd out of 34 cadets in the Class of 1855 (his roommate Comstock was first).

Second Lieutenant Weitzel's first assignment was helping improve the defenses of New Orleans under Major P.G.T. Beauregard, who had also graduated second in his class (as had Robert E. Lee in his). His work on Fort Jackson, Fort St. Philip and the Customs house earned the respect of Major Beauregard and Secretary of War Jefferson Davis, so Weitzel was promoted to First Lieutenant. Knowledge of those defenses proved crucial later in his career.

In 1859, Weitzel returned to West Point as assistant professor of Civil and Military Engineering, working under professor Dennis Mahan. During home leave in 1858, he had become engaged to Louisa C. Moor of Cincinnati, and they married at Cincinnati's German Lutheran Church on November 3, 1859. However, three weeks later, her skirts caught fire as she prepared Thanksgiving dinner, and despite Godfrey's efforts to douse them, she suffered severe burns and died within hours. Weitzel accompanied her body to Cincinnati. The grief-stricken widower was granted eight months' leave, including permission to travel to Germany.

While remaining close to the Moor family (who had no other children and virtually "adopted" him as a son), eventually, Weitzel became engaged on another furlough home. On January 6, 1865, he married Louise Bogen, daughter of Peter Bogen, a prominent pork-packer and grower of Catawba grapes for winemaking. They had three children, only one of whom survived infancy. Their first child was a stillborn son named Godfrey Weitzel, delivered on September 26, 1865. Their second child, Blanche Celeste Weitzel, was born on February 16, 1868, but contracted measles and died on April 5. Their third child, Irene Weitzel, born on April 11, 1876, lived until 1936 and left descendants.

== Career ==
Weitzel was promoted to first lieutenant of engineers in 1860. In 1861, he was reassigned to Washington, D.C. in the Corps of Engineers. His company served as the bodyguard during the inauguration of U.S. President Abraham Lincoln.

=== American Civil War ===
External videos
- "Life and Career of Godfrey Weitzel", presentation by G. William Quatman at the Museum of the Confederacy, C-SPAN

When the American Civil War began, Weitzel was assigned to construct defenses, including in Cincinnati and Washington, as well as for George McClellan in the Army of the Potomac in late 1861. He was then attached to the staff of Major General Benjamin F. Butler as chief engineer of the Department of the Gulf. When Union troops captured New Orleans, Weitzel became assistant military commander and acting mayor. He was promoted to brigadier general in August 1862 and two months later routed a large force of the enemy at Labadieville, Louisiana, which earned him a brevet promotion to major in the Regular Army. Weitzel commanded a brigade in the XIX Corps advancing in Major General Nathaniel P. Banks's operations in western Louisiana during April and May 1863, which led to the siege of Port Hudson. Weitzel was later brevetted lieutenant colonel in the Regular Army, "for gallant and meritorious services at the siege of Port Hudson," which fell on July 9, 1863, days after Vicksburg, Mississippi, about 120 miles upriver, the last Confederate stronghold on the great Mississippi, had fallen. Together those successful sieges and the continuing blockage of Southern ports completed the Anaconda Plan.

Beginning in May through September 1864, Weitzel was assigned as chief engineer of the Army of the James, still under General Benjamin F. Butler, which was targeting the Confederate capitol, as well as its naval defenses under the remnants of the James River Squadron. He was engaged in May at Swift's Creek and the actions near Drewry's Bluff and the Bermuda Hundred Campaign (against his former commander, now Confederate General P.G.T. Beauregard), and the Deep Bottom in August. By month's end, Weitzel was brevetted major general of volunteers "for meritorious and distinguished services during the civil war."

General Weitzel assumed command of the XVIII Corps from September 1864 through the end of the year, and was brevetted colonel in the regular army for the capture of Fort Harrison (renamed Fort Burnham for the Union commander dying in the assault) on September 29.

On November 7, 1864, Weitzel became a major general of volunteers and on December 3 was assigned command of the XXV Corps, consisting of U.S. Colored Troops under white officers. As the year ended, he participated in the unsuccessful First Battle of Fort Fisher, guarding Wilmington, North Carolina, the last major Confederate port. He and his corps were reassigned to Virginia two weeks later, when General Butler was relieved of duty in favor of General Alfred H. Terry, who captured the port on January 15.

During the war's final months, Ulysses S. Grant named Weitzel to command all Union troops north of the Appomattox River during the final operations against Robert E. Lee's Army of Northern Virginia. Speaking to his men on February 20, 1865, Weitzel told them:

Let history record that on the banks of the James 30,000 freemen not only gained their own liberty, but shattered the prejudice of the world, and gave to the land of their birth peace, union and glory.

After the fall of Petersburg, Confederate forces considered their capitol, Richmond, indefensible. They evacuated and set fire to its military and tobacco storehouses during their retreat on the night of April 2. The blaze spread to surrounding residential and commercial buildings. The city's mayor, Joseph Mayo traveled out along the Osborn Turnpike to Tree Hill Farm to find a Union commander to whom to surrender the city that night, and ask for help quelling the blaze. He found Majors Atherton H. Stevens Jr. and Eugene E. Graves who took his note to Major General Weitzel, who rode in to Richmond's city hall and accepted the formal surrender document at 8:15 that morning. Thus, Weitzel took possession of Richmond on April 3, 1865, and his Union forces extinguished the fires.

Weitzel soon established his headquarters in the home of Jefferson Davis. His aide, Lieutenant Johnston de Peyster, is credited with raising the first U.S. flag over the city after its capture by the Union. The next day, President Abraham Lincoln visited the Confederacy's capital. Weitzel served as Lincoln's confidential aide and bodyguard during two days of peace negotiations with Confederate representatives. Days after Lincoln's assassination, Secretary of War Edwin M. Stanton refused to believe the generous terms on which Lincoln would have allowed Virginia to rejoin the Union.

In histories of Masons' Hall in Richmond, it has been noted that Weitzel protected Masons' Hall from burning and looting in the time immediately after the Confederates' retreat from Richmond. Weitzel, who was a Freemason, was requested by old Masons of the city to protect the Hall, and Weitzel granted their request and had sentinels posted so that no harm was done to it.

In New Orleans in 1863, Weitzel had said that he didn't believe in "colored troops" and didn't want to command them, but after they had taken Richmond in 1865, in 1866, after the war's end, he reflected on the service of African American soldiers in the Union Army, stating:

Its organization was an experiment which has proven a perfect success. The conduct of its soldiers has been such to draw praise from persons most prejudiced against color, and there is no record which should give the colored race more pride than that left by the 25th Army Corps.

=== Postwar career ===
While other generals were feted at the end of the war, the German immigrant and his all-black Army corps were sent to Texas to evict the French who had occupied Mexico, which was considered one of the most difficult assignments. Weitzel remained in command of the District of Rio Grande until 1866, when he was mustered out of the volunteer service on March 1. He reverted to his regular Army rank, but was promoted to major of engineers later that year and to lieutenant colonel in 1882. In August 1866, he began designing an expanded canal around the Falls of the Ohio on the Indiana side.

In 1875, he established the temporary lighthouse on a pole in the lake at Alpena, Michigan. In 1877, he built a crib for the second Alpena Light. He also designed it as a timber building in the form of a brown wooden pyramidal tower, complete with a Sixth Order Fresnel lens. In July 1888, it burned with much of the town.

In 1881, Weitzel completed the building of a 515-foot (157 m) lock at the Soo Canal, at that time the largest canal lock in the world, and the next year the Stannard Rock Lighthouse on Lake Superior. He also helped design and build the Spectacle Reef Light with Colonel Orlando M. Poe. Transferred to Philadelphia, he was in charge of engineering projects in the region and Chairman of the Commission Advisatory to the Board of Harbor Commissioners.

== Death and legacy ==
Weitzel caught typhoid fever after being reassigned to Philadelphia. He lived near the University of Pennsylvania, but toured the city, and the fetid water of the Aramingo Canal about five miles away was blamed. Medical treatment was ineffective. He died from complications after about a month, on March 19, 1884.

His body was returned to Cincinnati for burial in Spring Grove Cemetery, in his in-laws' plot. Although Weitzel had wanted a private funeral, his hometown wanted to express gratitude for his service and conducted its largest gathering in many years. Ohio's First National Guard and Jacob D. Cox, as well as members of Cincinnati's Society of Ex-Army and Navy Officers, accompanied his remains to the English Lutheran Church (which was packed), and thousands lined the streets to the cemetery. He was survived by his elderly mother, his brother State Senator Lewis Weitzel, and his widow (who died on August 18, 1927) and daughter Irene (1876–1936).

The U.S. Army named one of the major streets in Arlington National Cemetery "Ord & Weitzel Drive" after the unassuming engineer, although the northern gate with that name was later removed upon the cemetery's expansion.

== See also ==
- List of American Civil War generals (Union)
- German Americans in the Civil War
- Saginaw River Light
- XXV Corps
