= Fairport Harbor, Ohio =

- Village
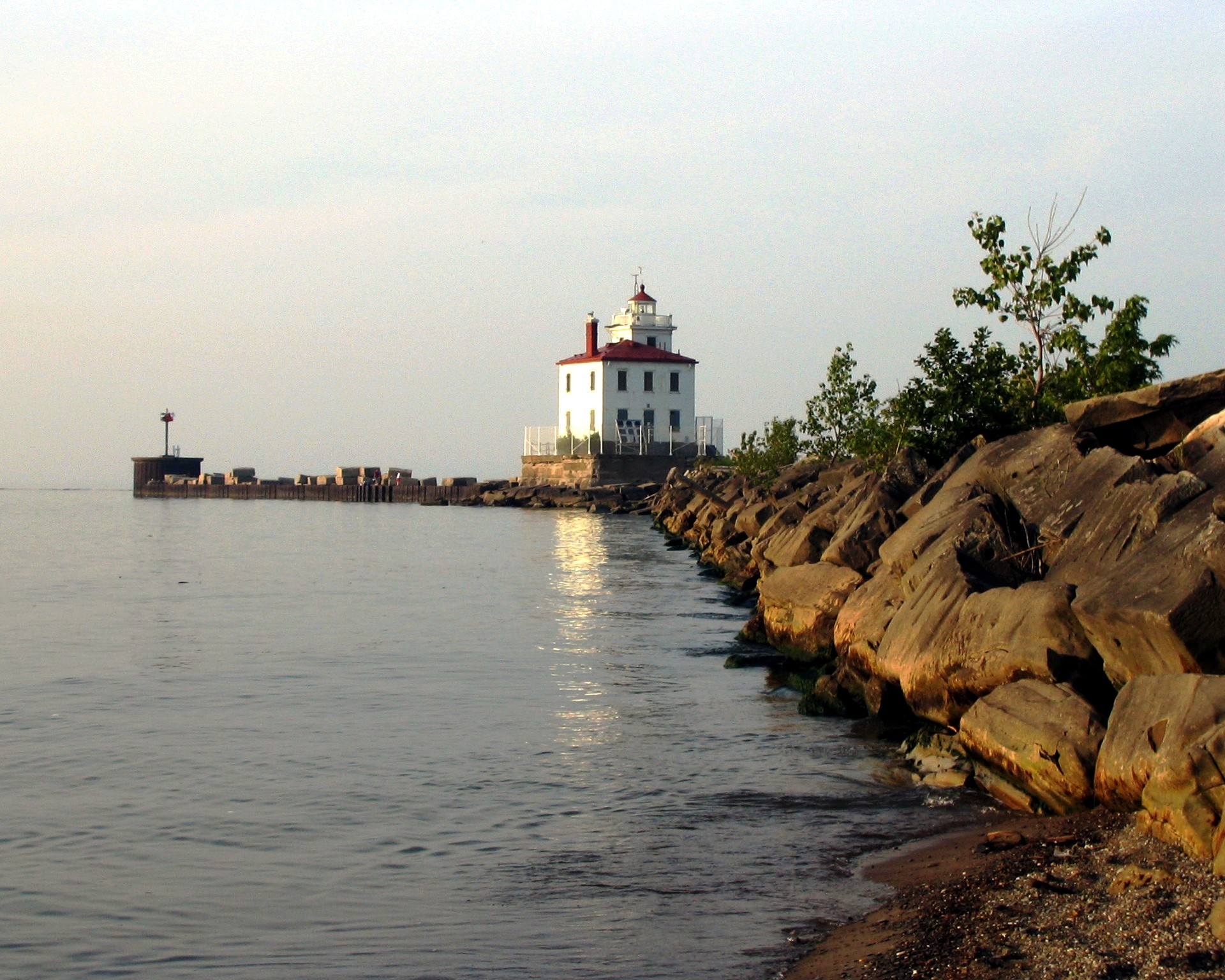
- Fairport Harbor West Breakwater Light viewed from the Headlands Dunes State Nature Preserve

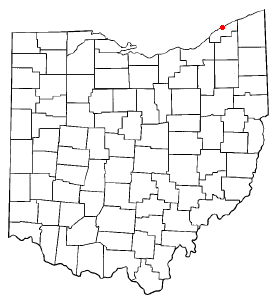
- Location of Fairport Harbor, Ohio

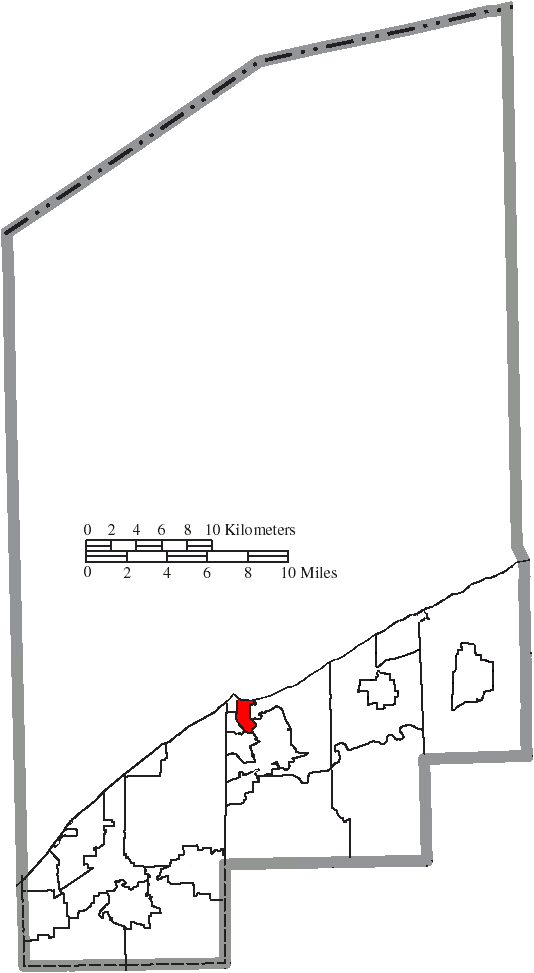
- Location of Fairport Harbor in Lake County
- Coordinates: 41°44′52″N 81°16′23″W
- Country: United States
- State: Ohio
- County: Lake
- Township: Painesville

Government
  - Type: Mayor–council
  - Mayor: Timothy Manross (D)

Area
  - Total: 1.11 sq mi (2.87 km^{2})
  - Land: 1.03 sq mi (2.66 km^{2})
  - Water: 0.081 sq mi (0.21 km^{2})
- Elevation: 610 ft (190 m)

Population (2020)
  - Total: 3,108
  - Estimate (2023): 3,081
  - Density: 3,026.1/sq mi (1,168.37/km^{2})
- Time zone: UTC-5 (Eastern (EST))
  - Summer (DST): UTC-4 (EDT)
- ZIP code: 44077
- Area code: 440
- FIPS code: 39-26306
- GNIS feature ID: 2398857
- Website: www.fairportharbor.org

Fairport Harbor is a village in Lake County, Ohio, United States, along Lake Erie at the mouth of the Grand River. The population was 3,108 at the 2020 census. A far-eastern suburb of Cleveland, it is part of the Cleveland metropolitan area.

Fairport Harbor is home to two lighthouses: the Fairport Harbor West Breakwater Light in Painesville Township, operated by the United States Coast Guard and the Fairport Harbor Light operated by the Fairport Harbor Historical Society. It is also the home of the Finnish Heritage Museum.

== History ==
Fairport Harbor's location at the mouth of the Grand River made it an ideal place for a settlement. After being claimed as part of the Connecticut Western Reserve by the Connecticut Land Company in 1796–1797, the town of Grandon was platted there on May 16, 1812. When the town incorporated in 1836, the name was changed to "Fairport." Fairport is a commendatory name. The current name was adopted in 1959.

After receiving federal sponsorship, the village's port flourished, and an influx of Finns, Hungarians, and Slovaks arrived there. The port also imported iron ore for use at area steel mills. The port continues operation at a more limited capacity.

Later in the village's history, the Diamond Alkali Company operated from 1912 to 1976.

In recent years Fairport Harbor has hosted the Lake County Perch Fest and opened the Finnish Heritage Museum.

On January 24, 2011, an overpressurized Dominion East Ohio natural gas pipeline caused devices in at least 17 dwellings to explode, causing the structures to burn and leading to a mass evacuation. The excess pressure has been attributed to ice present in a sensor line causing a false reading in a pressure regulator. The backup regulator for the pipeline also failed. While no injuries were reported in the community, the cost of damage was placed at approximately $1.2 million.

== Geography ==
Fairport Harbor is located within Painesville Township.

According to the United States Census Bureau, the village has a total area of 1.11 square miles (2.87 km^{2}), of which 1.03 square miles (2.67 km^{2}) are land and 0.08 square miles (0.21 km^{2}) are water.

== Demographics ==
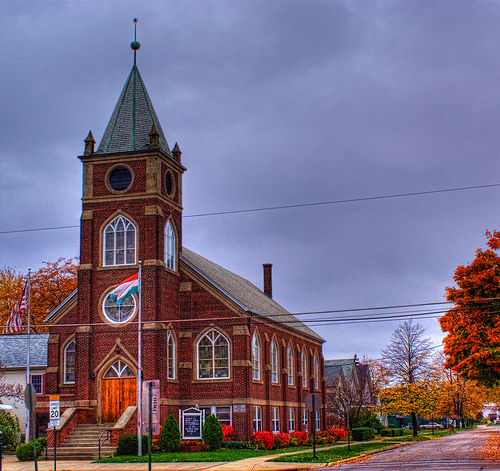
Hungarian Reformed Church in Fairport Harbor

Historical population
Census	Pop.	Note	%±
1880	296		—
1890	1,171		295.6%
1900	2,073		77.0%
1910	2,263		9.2%
1920	4,211		86.1%
1930	4,972		18.1%
1940	4,528		−8.9%
1950	4,519		−0.2%
1960	4,267		−5.6%
1970	3,665		−14.1%
1980	3,357		−8.4%
1990	2,978		−11.3%
2000	3,180		6.8%
2010	3,109		−2.2%
2020	3,108		0.0%
2023 (est.)	3,081	▼	−0.9%
U.S. Decennial Census

=== 2020 census ===
As of the 2020 census, Fairport Harbor had a population of 3,108. The median age was 45.2 years. 17.7% of residents were under the age of 18 and 21.2% of residents were 65 years of age or older. For every 100 females there were 91.7 males, and for every 100 females age 18 and over there were 90.9 males age 18 and over.

100.0% of residents lived in urban areas, while 0.0% lived in rural areas.

There were 1,502 households in Fairport Harbor, of which 21.7% had children under the age of 18 living in them. Of all households, 32.4% were married-couple households, 25.0% were households with a male householder and no spouse or partner present, and 34.0% were households with a female householder and no spouse or partner present. About 41.8% of all households were made up of individuals and 16.4% had someone living alone who was 65 years of age or older.

There were 1,661 housing units, of which 9.6% were vacant. The homeowner vacancy rate was 1.3% and the rental vacancy rate was 7.5%.

Racial composition as of the 2020 census
Race	Number	Percent
White	2,788	89.7%
Black or African American	92	3.0%
American Indian and Alaska Native	7	0.2%
Asian	17	0.5%
Native Hawaiian and Other Pacific Islander	2	0.1%
Some other race	45	1.4%
Two or more races	157	5.1%
Hispanic or Latino (of any race)	123	4.0%

=== 2010 census ===
As of the census of 2010, there were 3,109 people, 1,427 households, and 764 families living in the village. The population density was 3,018.4 inhabitants per square mile (1,165.4/km^{2}). There were 1,677 housing units at an average density of 1,628.2 per square mile (628.7/km^{2}). The racial makeup of the village was 94.7% White, 2.1% African American, 0.2% Native American, 0.3% Asian, 0.6% from other races, and 2.1% from two or more races. Hispanic or Latino of any race were 2.2% of the population.

There were 1,427 households, of which 25.1% had children under the age of 18 living with them, 35.8% were married couples living together, 13.0% had a female householder with no husband present, 4.8% had a male householder with no wife present, and 46.5% were non-families. 38.6% of all households were made up of individuals, and 12.4% had someone living alone who was 65 years of age or older. The average household size was 2.17 and the average family size was 2.90.

The median age in the village was 41 years. 20.7% of residents were under the age of 18; 9% were between the ages of 18 and 24; 25.7% were from 25 to 44; 29.8% were from 45 to 64; and 14.8% were 65 years of age or older. The gender makeup of the village was 48.6% male and 51.4% female.

=== 2000 census ===
As of the census of 2000, there were 3,180 people, 1,404 households, and 839 families living in the village. The population density was 3,052.2 inhabitants per square mile (1,178.5/km^{2}). There were 1,546 housing units at an average density of 1,483.8 per square mile (572.9/km^{2}). The racial makeup of the village was 97.96% White, 0.57% African American, 0.09% Native American, 0.16% Asian, 0.03% Pacific Islander, 0.13% from other races, and 1.07% from two or more races. Hispanic or Latino of any race were 1.38% of the population. 15.9% were of German, 12.3% Finnish, 11.5% Hungarian, 11.2% Irish, 9.3% Italian and 5.2% English ancestry according to Census 2000. 95.5% spoke English, 2.4% Finnish and 2.1% Hungarian as their first language.

There were 1,404 households, out of which 26.9% had children under the age of 18 living with them, 41.6% were married couples living together, 12.3% had a female householder with no husband present, and 40.2% were non-families. 34.3% of all households were made up of individuals, and 11.1% had someone living alone who was 65 years of age or older. The average household size was 2.26 and the average family size was 2.90.

In the village, the population was spread out, with 23.0% under the age of 18, 8.8% from 18 to 24, 31.4% from 25 to 44, 22.1% from 45 to 64, and 14.7% who were 65 years of age or older. The median age was 37 years. For every 100 females there were 98.0 males. For every 100 females age 18 and over, there were 95.2 males.

The median income for a household in the village was $35,205, and the median income for a family was $45,142. Males had a median income of $31,971 versus $24,657 for females. The per capita income for the village was $20,722. About 5.9% of families and 7.4% of the population were below the poverty line, including 7.8% of those under age 18 and 6.6% of those age 65 or over.

== Education ==
It is in the Fairport Harbor Exempted Village School District.
