= Port Clinton Light =

Lighthouse in Ohio, US

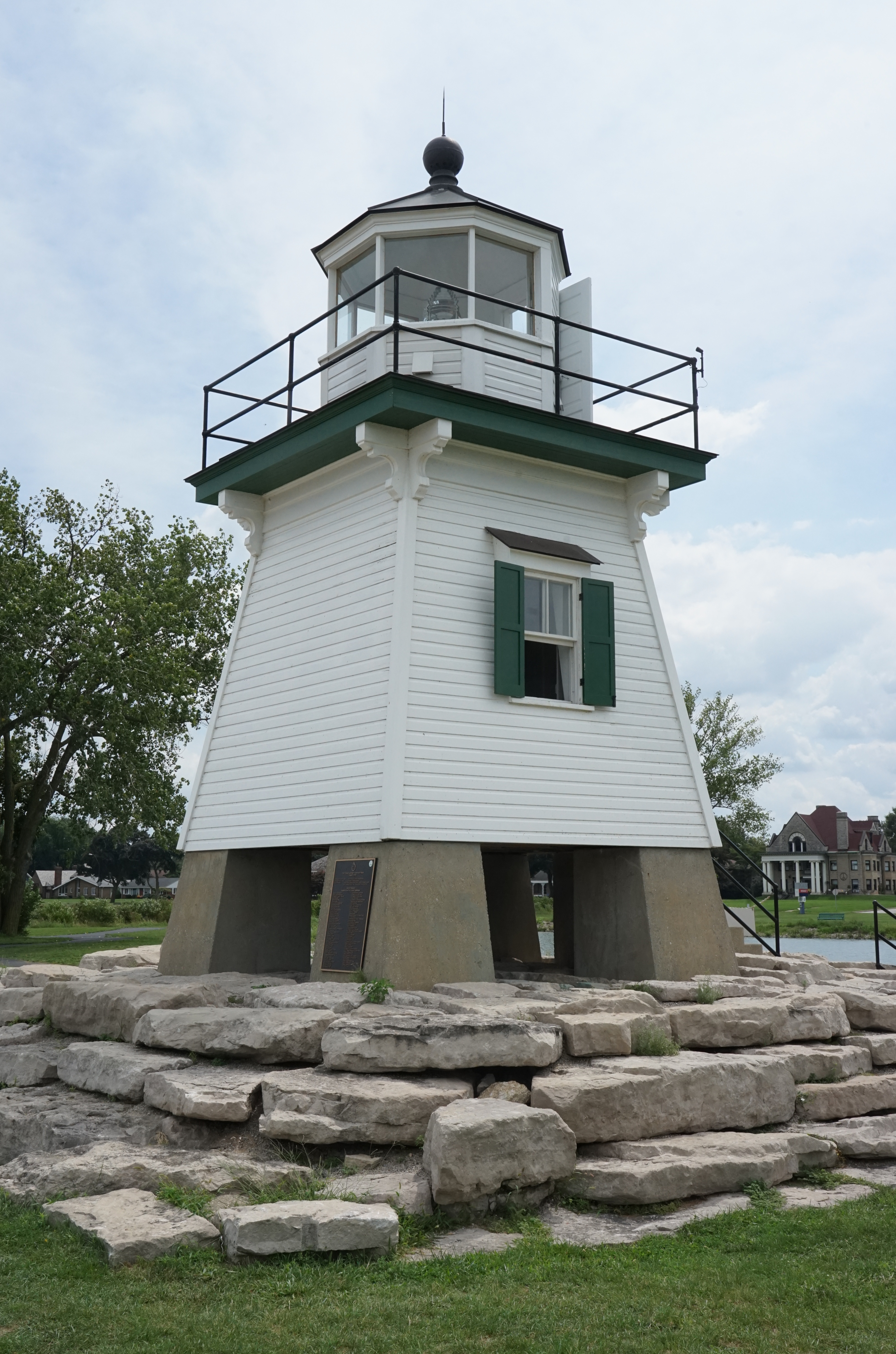
- Location: Port Clinton, Ohio
- Coordinates: 41.5150°N 82.9344°W

Tower
- Constructed: 1833
- Foundation: Stone
- Construction: Wood
- Automated: 1926
- Height: 20 ft (6.1 m)
- Shape: Pyramidal (Four sided)
- Markings: White with brown foundation, black lantern roof

Light
- First lit: 1833 (First Tower); 1896 (Current)
- Deactivated: 1927 - 2016^{A}
- Focal height: 26 ft (7.9 m)
- Lens: Sixth order Fresnel lens (original), Fifth order Fresnel lens (Replica) (current)
- Characteristic: Fixed Red

Port Clinton Light is a lighthouse in Port Clinton, Ohio, United States at the northern end of Water Works Park. It was previously located on the outer end of the west pier which is located at the city's harbor entrance. This lighthouse has two incarnations that were built with different materials. Only the present structure survives as it was moved to a marina and replaced by a skeleton tower in 1952. The marina then sold the lighthouse back to the city, and it was placed in the park fully restored. At just 20 ft (6.1 m), Port Clinton Light is recorded as the shortest lighthouse in the state.

== History ==
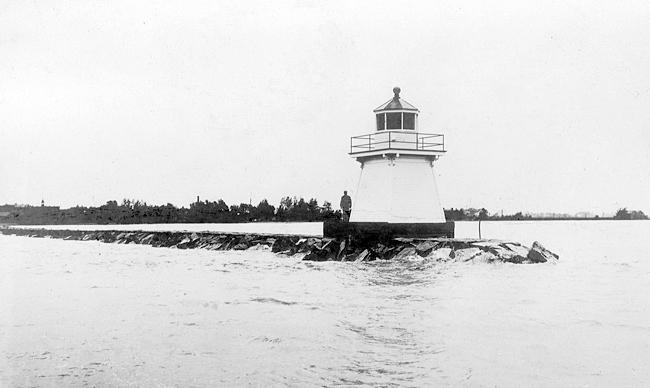
The Port Clinton Light at its original location in 1904.

The first lighthouse was constructed of split-stone and was 40 feet tall in height. Austin Smith was the first keeper of the lighthouse six months after it was built. Despite calls for the light to be discontinued due to a lack of harbor traffic, it remained until 1870. In that year the lantern room was removed from the tower which resulted in complaints from residents regarding its aid. In 1883, piers in the port were extended into Lake Erie which prompted congress to act in 1895 on the construction of a new lighthouse. The new lighthouse was constructed from wood and went into service on the outer end of the west pier in 1896. The old tower was razed in 1899, and the original keeper's dwelling was replaced in 1901 in favor for a more modern residence.

The lighthouse was automated in 1926, and was sold the following year which resulted in its deactivation. The Keeper's residence was used as an apartment building in the 1940s and later as a restaurant in 1983. The wooden lighthouse was removed from the pier in 1952 and was relocated to the new owner's marina on the Portage River. That same year a new white skeleton tower was erected on the spot which used a modern 375 mm lens.

In 2009 the restaurant that had been in the Keeper's residence closed due to a fire. The owner was arrested and charged with arson in 2010 which resulted in the residence being sold to Croghan Colonial Bank in 2013. The wooden lighthouse tower was donated in 2011 to the city of Port Clinton by the owners of the same marina that had acquired it 59 years prior. Repairs were made to the old tower which resulted in a complete restoration but there were legal battles on where the structure should be placed. The Port Clinton Lighthouse Conservancy and the city finally had everything settled on July 14, 2015, with the placement in the northern end of Water Works Park. While the structure is illuminated during nightfall it is no longer considered a navigational aid.

== Keepers ==
Name	Tenure
Austin Smith	1833–1848
William B. Craighill	1848–1849
Benjamin J. Orcutt	1849–1853
George O. Momeny	1853–1859
A. Borden	1859
Leander S. Porter	1864–1870
Robert P. Waterfield	1896–1900
Daniel Finn	1900
George H. Pope	1900–1911
David C. Sutherland	1912–1926^{B}

== Notes ==
A. The lighthouse is considered active as lit but is no longer used as a navigational aid.
B. David's son Wallace looked after the lighthouse for a few months until automation.
