= Turtle Island (Lake Erie) =

Island in the United States of America

- Turtle Island seen from the east (2021)

- Location within Michigan

Geography
- Location: Lake Erie
- Coordinates: 41°45′09″N 83°23′28″W
- Area: 1.5 acres (0.61 ha)

Administration
- United States
- States: Michigan / Ohio
- Counties: Monroe County, Michigan / Lucas County, Ohio

Demographics
- Population: Uninhabited

Turtle Island is a 1.5-acre (0.61 ha) island in the western portion of Lake Erie in the United States. The island is divided between the U.S. states of Michigan and Ohio. Turtle Island is located about five miles (8.0 km) northeast of the mouth of the Maumee River in Maumee Bay. Today, the island houses several abandoned structures and the ruins of Turtle Island Light, a lighthouse dating back to 1866. According to the Census Bureau, most of the island physically lies in Jerusalem Township in Lucas County, Ohio with the smaller Michigan portion being part of Erie Township in Monroe County, Michigan. It was sold in 1995, and there was a failed housing project in the early 2000s, and it was sold again in 2022 to private ownership.

The island has been eroded by Lake Erie. The lighthouse has been damaged by winter storms and it is one of the most endangered lighthouses in the nation. The island was once over 6 acres in the 19th century, but is now less than an acre. It is the only sand and gravel island in the whole lake, and is more vulnerable. There are periodic efforts to try to rebuild the island, save the lighthouse, and make a park area.

== History ==
The Miami tribe was the first to inhabit the small island prior to 1800. They used the island primarily to gather seagull eggs. The island was named after Miami chief Mishikinakwa (c. 1747–1812), who was an influential Native American leader in the Northwest Territory during the American Revolution. Nicknamed Little Turtle, he later became popular among the American people after dissenting from his native tribe in the pursuit of peace negotiations with the Americans.

The British operated a small fort on the island around 1794 in defense of the mouth of the Maumee River, but the fort was soon abandoned. There are conflicting accounts as to who maintained control of the island during this time. Local folklore alludes to the belief that the Indians controlled the island and used it as a military fort, while others claim the British held control of it until losing it during the War of 1812. Official accounts of the history of Turtle Island date back to 1827, when the island itself was sold at a federal government auction in nearby Monroe, Michigan. The island was bought but sold back to the United States four years later. Turtle Island was believed to not even be a true island on its own but rather a former extension of Little Cedar Point Peninsula.

=== Early 1900s ===
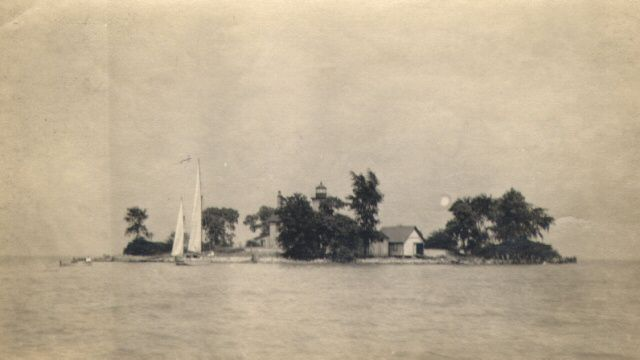
Turtle island in the early 1900s

With the completion of the Toledo Harbor Light in 1904, the shallower shipping lane around Turtle Island was rerouted to deeper waters, and the lighthouse on Turtle Island was abandoned. Turtle Island Light was officially decommissioned on May 15, 1904. Federal officials removed the components of the lighthouse but left all the structures in place. The island was sold at an auction to A. H. Merrill for $1,650 in December 1904. The island went unused and was subsequently vandalized over the next 30 years. Most of the original structures were completely stripped of their elements. In the late 1920s, the Toledo Blade reported on the status of the island by saying, “Vandals have wrecked the house, stealing everything that could be salvaged from the structure except the grim, bare walls which stand as a monument to the service this light rendered for nearly half a century.”

In 1933, A. H. Merrill transferred ownership of the island to George Merrill. He signed a lease with the Associated Yacht Club of Toledo (AYC) for them to build a series of docks and use the island for recreational purposes. However, the AYC ran out of money during the Great Depression and was forced to abandon their plans for rejuvenating Turtle Island. The AYC attempted to work with the state of Ohio to receive funding to revamp the island, but the state determined the cost of restoring the island would exceed its beneficial use by the public since the island was too small and remote. The AYC abandoned the island in 1937, and the island continued to decay with no improvements. The lighthouse keeper's headquarters were demolished, and the island suffered further damage from strong winds and waves during the 1965 Palm Sunday tornado outbreak.

=== Border dispute ===
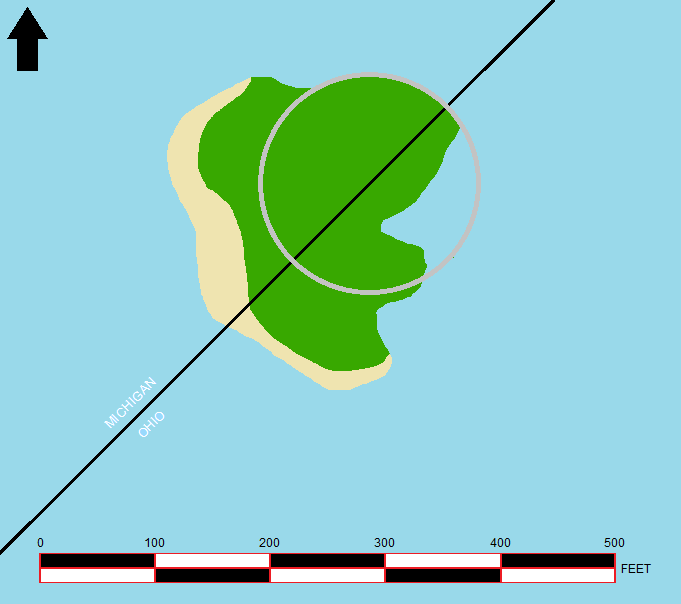
The rough location of the Michigan-Ohio boundary running through Turtle Island. The gray circle is the sea wall that was built on the island prior to 1945 to "hold" the island together and wound up being the reference for where the state line was set.

The small strip of land surrounding the mouth of the Maumee River was under the jurisdiction of the Michigan Territory, because the borders originally drawn up for the Northwest Ordinance of 1787 set a territorial boundary as a straight line from the southernmost edge of Lake Michigan. When Ohio became the first in the Northwest Territory to gain statehood in 1803, the state's northern border did not include this important area, which was later given to the Michigan Territory when it was formally organized in 1805. Turtle Island fell under the jurisdiction of the Michigan Territory, and when the first Turtle Island Light was constructed in 1831, it was within the boundaries of the territory. When Toledo was founded in 1833, it was part of the Michigan Territory, and the Port of Toledo operated the lighthouse. Because Ohio disputed Michigan's ownership over this area, it led to the heated Toledo War, a border dispute between the Michigan Territory and the state of Ohio for the area known as the Toledo Strip. In late 1836, President Andrew Jackson intervened on behalf of Ohio and gave the Toledo Strip to Ohio in exchange for Michigan getting a portion of the Upper Peninsula when it became a state soon after on January 26, 1837.

The Toledo Strip and the city of Toledo became part of Ohio, but Turtle Island remained part of the Michigan Territory. The lighthouse was still operated by the Port of Toledo, but the island was still claimed and charted as Michigan territory within Monroe County. Control of the island was not disputed by either state, and the political status of the island was forgotten after the lighthouse was decommissioned in 1904. The state boundary of Ohio and Michigan remained unchanged from 1837 until 1973 when the status of Turtle Island was finally recognized and resolved long after tensions over the Toledo War had ended. The Supreme Court of the United States intervened, and on February 22, 1973, an agreement was reached between the two states. The state lines were redrawn for the last time to cut exactly through the center of the tiny island's 190-foot (58 m) diameter sea wall at a 45° angle, while the ruins of the lighthouse itself were included in the Ohio half. The island was divided between Monroe County and Ohio's Lucas County. This was merely an act of politics, as the island had been abandoned and continually decaying for the past 70 years. The Michigan half fell under the jurisdiction of Erie Township, while the city of Toledo assumed full control over the other half.

Turtle Island Lighthouse Restoration Association bought the island in the early 1990s with plans to expand the island and rebuild the lighthouse, but it did not work out leading to sale in 1995. In 1995 the island was bought by a Jim Neumann, who had dreamed of buying it since his childhood vacations to the area.

=== 21st century ===
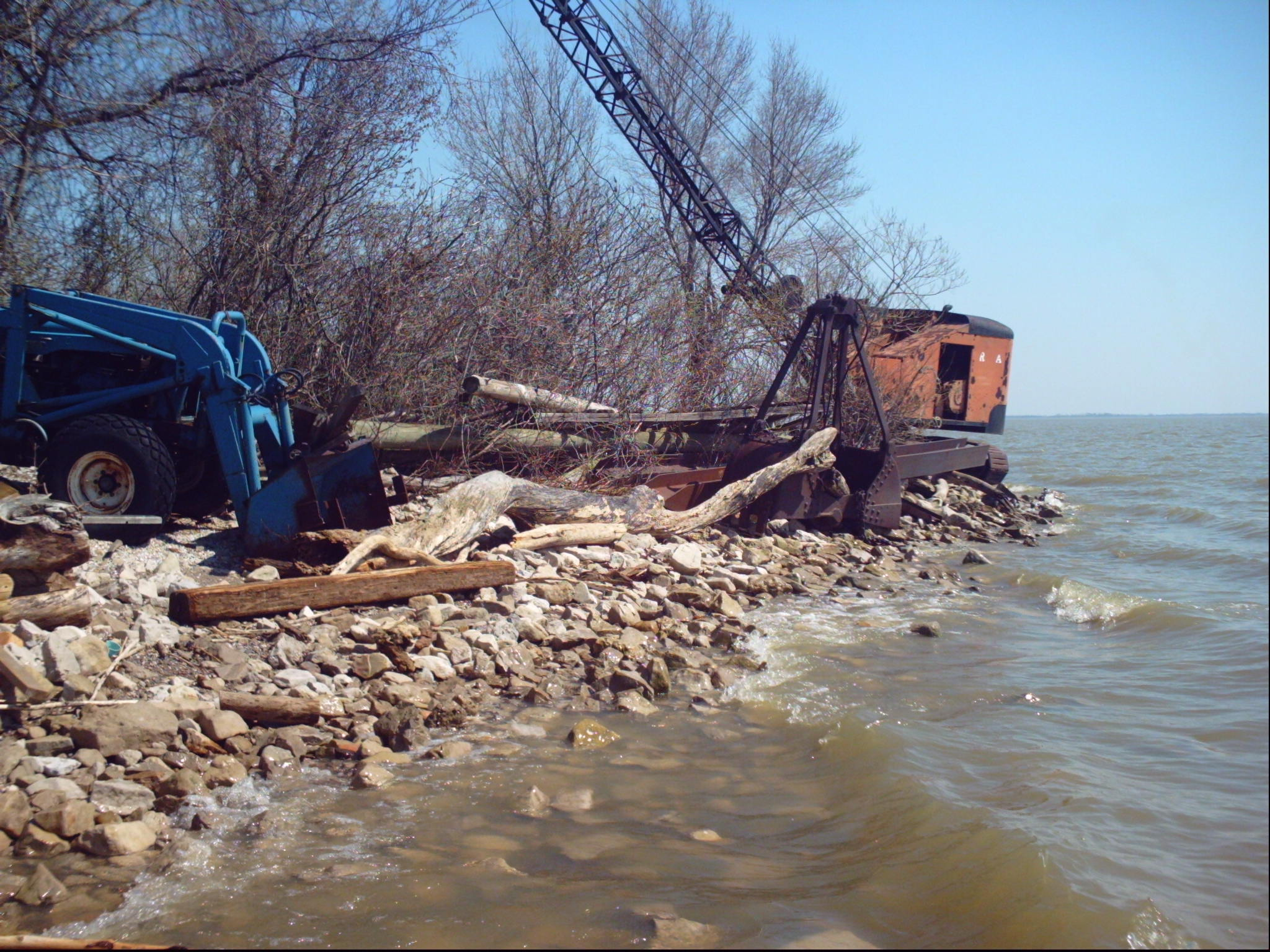
Construction of new structures on the island was halted by a court order.

The island remains privately owned, and Turtle Island only has remnants of structures still standing. In February 2002, the owner of the island attempted to build three new buildings on the island with the reported intent of using them for summer vacation rentals. Authorities in Monroe County issued a decree to stop the construction, because the owner failed to get the building permits to build on the Michigan side of the island. The decree was ignored, but the structures were never completely finished before they were mostly destroyed by large ice packs during the winter of 2009. Erie Township, which has jurisdiction over the Michigan half of Turtle Island, planned to remove the now-destroyed structures from the island and clean up the remaining debris. As of 2008, this had not taken place yet, because the cost of doing so would be too expensive. Eventually, the structures were burned down. The township has continually debated on what to do with the island.

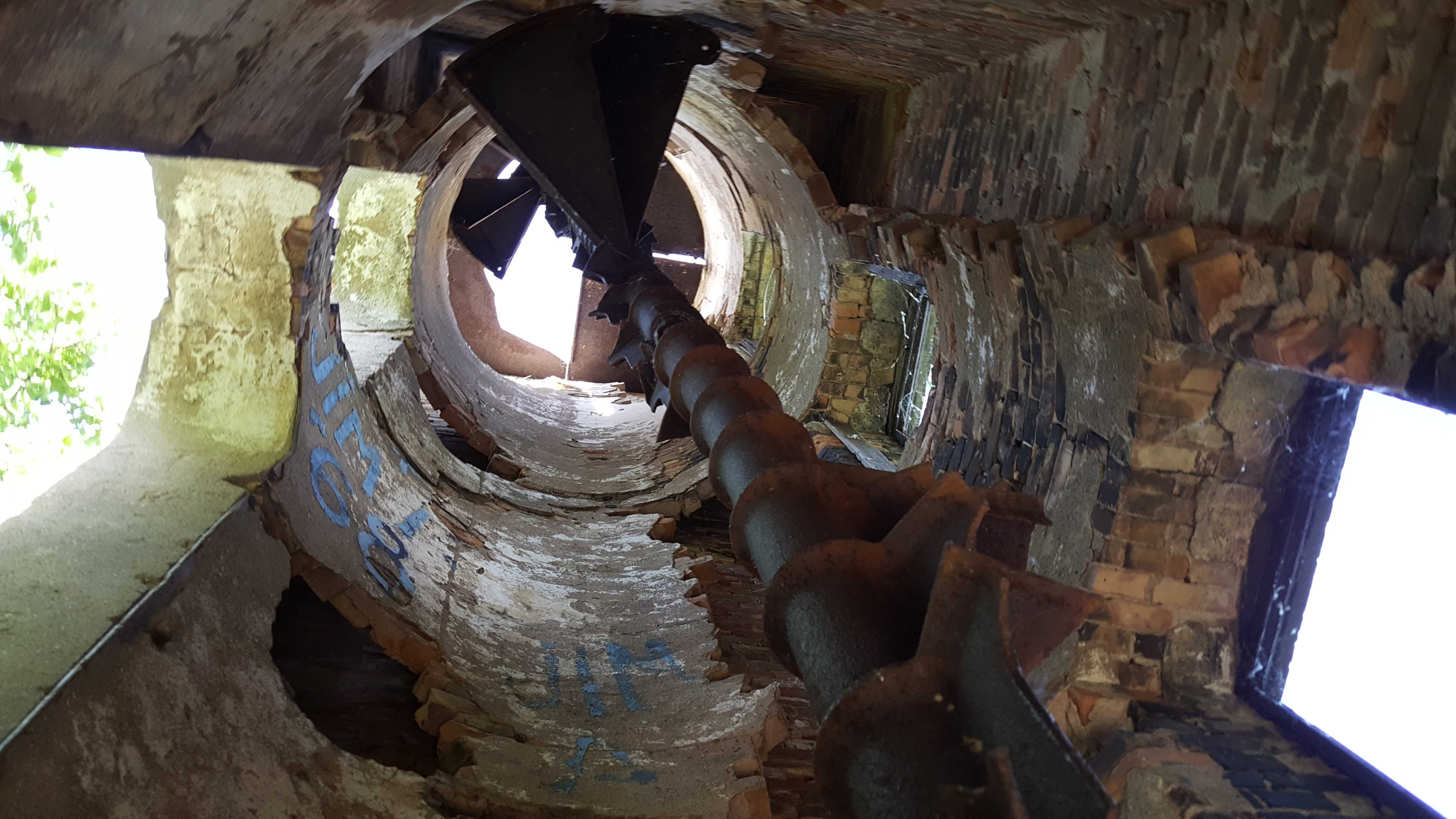
Interior of old lighthouse on Turtle Island

On the island are the remains of the 1866 Turtle Island Light; the tower still stands but the top was blown off during a windstorm on Palm Sunday in 1965, exposing the iron spikes that once held the lantern in place. Continued efforts at restoring the lighthouse have been unsuccessful. Portions of the concrete wall constructed to originally protect the lighthouse have also eroded away, further exposing the island. Lighthouse Digest lists the decaying Turtle Island Light as critically endangered on its Doomsday List of threatened lighthouses. Even though the island is remote, it is currently closed to the public, although it is impossible for this to be enforced.

As of 2019, the island was still owned by the same person, who had plans to try to restore the lighthouse and occasionally visited the island to clean up debris. The island was sold again in 2022, to someone that had also bought the Detroit River Lighthouse; as part of the deal the previous owner was still allowed visitation rights.

== See also ==
- Lost Peninsula (A nearby peninsula also split between Ohio and Michigan)
