= South Bass Island Light =

Lighthouse on Lake Erie in Ohio, United States

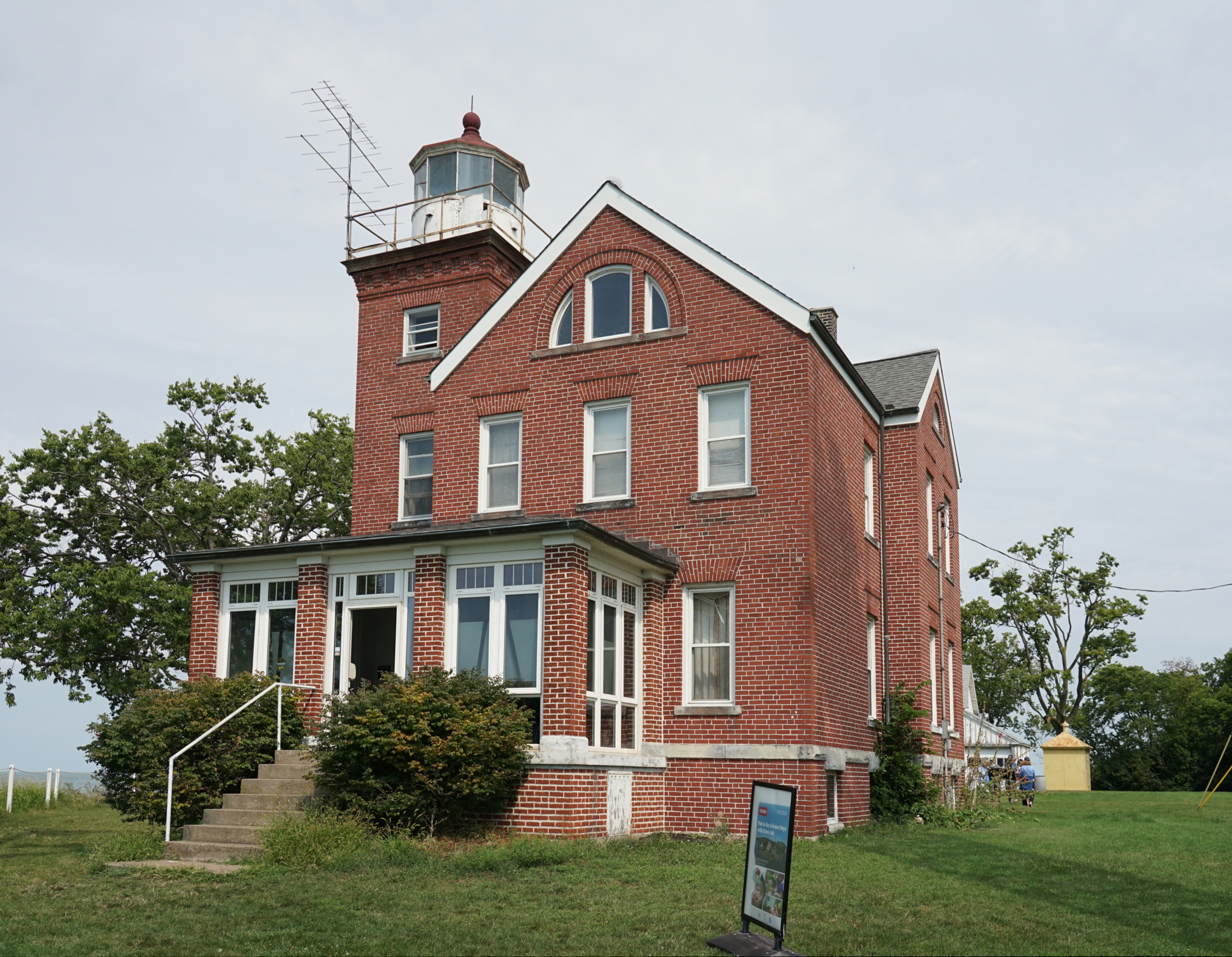
- Location: South Bass Island, Ohio in Lake Erie
- Coordinates: 41.6290°N 82.8415°W

Tower
- Constructed: 1895
- Foundation: Brick
- Construction: Brick
- Height: 60 feet (18 m)
- Shape: Two-story house with square tower at corner
- Heritage: National Register of Historic Places listed place

Light
- First lit: 1897
- Deactivated: 1962
- Focal height: 22.5 m (74 ft)
- Lens: Fourth-order Fresnel lens
- Range: 13 nautical miles; 24 kilometres (15 mi)
- Characteristic: fixed red
- South Bass Island Light
- U.S. National Register of Historic Places
- Built: 1897
- Architect: Smith, Lt. Col. Jared A.; Corps of Engineers
- Architectural style: Queen Anne
- MPS: Light Stations of Ohio MPS
- NRHP reference No.: 90000473
- Added to NRHP: April 05, 1990

South Bass Island Light is a lighthouse on the southern end of its eponymous island in Lake Erie. It was listed in the National Register of Historic Places on April 5, 1990 and is thought to be the only lighthouse in the United States owned by a university - Ohio State.

== History ==
Increasing tourist traffic to the island in the late 1800s prompted the Lighthouse Board to approve construction of a light in 1893. The light was to help to mark the southern passage from Sandusky to Toledo, along with several other lights in the vicinity. The site chosen was Parker Point on the southwest corner of the island, and in 1895 a two-acre plot was purchased. Construction was protracted due to the failure of the original contractors to secure proper bonds, and the light was not brought into service until 1897. It is an atypical structure for its era, a large 2 1/2-story brick Queen Anne house with a 3-story tower built into one corner. It was fitted with a fourth order Fresnel lens, originally lit by oil, but eventually converted to electricity.

The tenure of the first keeper, Harry Riley, and his assistant, Sam Anderson, was brief. Concerns about a smallpox outbreak on the island were realized in August 1898, though as it happened the cases were mild and there were no deaths. Nevertheless, a newspaper report on September 1 told of Anderson, who had been hired just the previous month, drinking heavily out of fear of the disease and hiding himself in the lighthouse's basement, where he kept a number of snakes. He then emerged and threw himself into the lake, shouting, "God save them all." His body was recovered the following day. On the same day that this report appeared, Riley was picked up by the police in Sandusky, apparently insane. He was committed to the state mental hospital and died there the following March. Tragedy struck again in 1925, when the keeper, Charles B. Duggan, was killed in a fall from a cliff on the west side of the island.

In 1962 the light was deactivated, replaced by a steel tower standing adjacent to the old house. The lens was transferred to the Lake Erie Island Historical Museum, where it can still be seen. Five years later, the property was declared surplus. Ohio State, which maintains the Stone Laboratory on Gibraltar Island at nearby Put-in-Bay, saw an opportunity for expanded facilities; eventually a thirty-year quit claim deed was negotiated, and when this expired in 1997, the university took permanent possession, save for the replacement light tower. An automated NOAA meteorological station was placed on the property in 1983. The lighthouse is used to house university researchers and staff; beginning in the summer of 2007 it was also made available for occasional tours. The exterior of the house is almost unaltered, and in 1990 it was added to the National Register of Historic Places.
