= Spectacle Reef Light =

Lighthouse in Michigan, United States

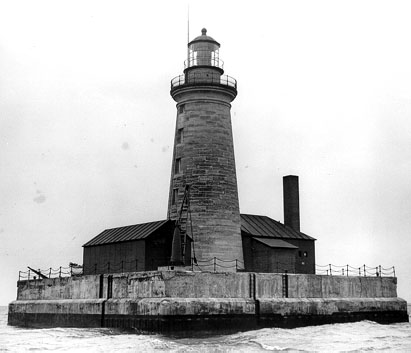
- U.S. Coast Guard Archive
- Location: Cheboygan County, Michigan, Lake Huron
- Coordinates: 45°46′24″N 84°8′12″W

Tower
- Constructed: 1874
- Foundation: cofferdam/timber exposed crib
- Construction: Monolithic limestone/iron bolts
- Automated: 1972
- Height: 80 feet (24 m)
- Shape: Frustum of a cone on a rectangular house
- Markings: natural with red roofs
- Heritage: National Register of Historic Places listed place
- Fog signal: HORN: air–diaphone

Light
- First lit: 1874
- Focal height: 86 feet (26 m)
- Lens: Second-order Fresnel lens (original), Solar powered 300 mm Tideland Signal acrylic lens (current)
- Intensity: 400,000 candlepower white; 80,000 candlepower red
- Range: 11 nautical miles (20 km; 13 mi)
- Characteristic: Flashing alternately white every 60 seconds, red every 5 seconds. Operates year round. 100 candlepower white winter light which flashes every 5 seconds
- Spectacle Reef Light Station
- U.S. National Register of Historic Places
- Nearest city: Benton Township, Michigan
- Area: 0.9 acres (0.36 ha)
- Built: 1874
- Architects: US Lighthouse Board: Colonel Orlando Metcalfe Poe, and Major Godfrey Weitzel
- MPS: U.S. Coast Guard Lighthouses and Light Stations on the Great Lakes TR
- NRHP reference No.: 05000744
- Added to NRHP: July 27, 2005

Spectacle Reef Light is a lighthouse 11 miles (18 km) east of the Straits of Mackinac and is located at the northern end of Lake Huron, Michigan. It was designed and built by Colonel Orlando Metcalfe Poe and Major Godfrey Weitzel, and was the most expensive lighthouse ever built on the Great Lakes.. Orlando Metcalfe Poe is also remembered as the Chief Engineer for William T. Sherman’s Army as it fought through Tennessee to capture Atlanta in 1864, during the American Civil War, and which then went on to march into Georgia, South and North Carolina. His engineer duties then were largely the building of fortifications and railways, which after the fall of Atlanta became destruction of those same in enemy territory, and of any building considered to be of use to the Confederate war effort. Trestle bridge and pontoon bridge construction also fell under his command, very important in crossing the many water challenges of the Confederate states.

Because of the challenges of building on a shoal, including laying an underwater crib, it is said to be the "most spectacular engineering achievement" in lighthouse construction on Lake Huron. It took four years to build because weather limited work to mostly the summer season. Workers lived in a structure at the site; one of the limiting conditions. It ranks high as an engineering achievement among all the lighthouses built on the Great lakes.

In 2020, The Spectacle Reef Preservation Society was formed and began to restore the lighthouse.

== Background and planning ==
From 1852 to the beginning of the 20th century, the United States Lighthouse Board was active in building lighthouses to support ship traffic on the Great Lakes. Between 1852 and 1860, it built 26 new lights. Even as the American Civil War and its aftermath slowed construction, it completed a dozen new lights in that decade. In the 1870s alone, it built 43 new lights on the lakes. During the 1880s, more than 100 lights were constructed.

As the new century began, the Lighthouse Board operated 334 major lights, 67 fog horns and 563 buoys on the Great Lakes. During the 19th century, design of Great Lakes lights slowly evolved. Until 1870 the most common design was to build a keeper's dwelling with the light on the dwelling's roof or on a relatively small square tower attached to the house. In the 1870s, so as to raise lights to a higher focal plane, conical brick towers, usually between 80 and 100 feet tall, were constructed. In the 1890s steel-lined towers began to replace the older generation of brick buildings, such as Big Sable Point Light.

The Spectacle Reef Light was built during a forty-year period—between 1870 and 1910—when engineers began to build lights on isolated islands, reefs, and shoals that were significant navigational hazards. To that time, light ships such as the Huron were the only practical way to mark the hazards. They were dangerous for the sailors who crewed them and difficult to maintain.

"Worse, regardless of the type of anchors used, lightships could be blown off their expected location in severe storms, making them a potential liability in the worst weather when captains would depend on the charted location of these lights to measure their own ship's distance from dangerous rocks."

Using underwater crib designs, the Board built the Waugoshance Light (1851) on a shoal, and demonstrated a "new level of expertise" in constructing of the Spectacle Reef Light (1874), Stannard Rock Light (1882), and Detroit River Light (1885). "The long and expensive process of building lights" in remote and difficult sites "ended in nationally publicized engineering projects that constructed" Rock of Ages Light (1908) and the White Shoal (1910) lights.

In the early 20th century, the Lighthouse Board and the new Lighthouse Service continued to build new lights on the Great Lakes. For 1925, the Board administered around the Great Lakes: 433 major lights; ten lightships; 129 fog signals; and about 1,000 buoys. Of these 1,771 navigational aids, only 160 stations had resident keepers. By that time, most navigational aids were automated. Most of the 21st century's Great Lakes lighthouses (excepting e.g., Poe Reef Light and Gravelly Shoal Light) had been constructed by 1925.

Building on shoals was part of a larger pattern of building 14 reef lights around Michigan, also intended to help ships navigate through and around the shoals and hazards around the Straits of Mackinac.

== Construction ==
The site was first marked by a buoy in 1868. The construction was undertaken under the auspices of the Lighthouse Board and was a feat of civil engineering and endurance. Construction began in 1870, in answer to the disastrous loss of a large number of ships during the 1860s at the site; in particular, two schooners ran aground and broke up in 1867. The massive cost of the loss helped convince Congress that it would be more cost effective to build a light and reduce the potential of future shipwrecks. The lighthouse is built upon a reef shaped like a pair of eyeglasses (hence its name) and is located in the path of littoral commerce on Lake Huron. The increase in freighter traffic through the straits increased the risk of more ship losses without better signing of hazards. The Spectacle Reef Lighthouse cost $406,000. One costly item was the purchase of a steamer to convey the materials to the site.

The foundation was laid in a cofferdam protected by a crib made from 12-inch-thick (0.30 m) timber and submerged 11 feet (3.4 m) below the surface. The crib was constructed upon slipways at the depot, like building a ship, then launched and towed by tugboats to the reef, where it was sunk and grounded on the site. This crib is massive: 8,464 square feet (786.3 m^{2}) and 24 feet (7.3 m) high (203,136 cubic feet (5,752.2 m^{3})). It created a protected pond, making a base for the cofferdam, a wharf, and worker's quarters. The cofferdam was pumped out to expose the bedrock, upon which the masonry courses were laid. The light's 20-month construction process had to be spread out over a calendar period of four years (1870–1874). No work was possible during the winter, most of the spring, and most of the fall, because of the inclement weather.

Bois Blanc Island is the nearest point of land, 10 miles (16 km) to 12 miles (19 km) to the northwest; but neither it nor Ninemile Point, 10.3 miles (16.6 km) to the south, formed a suitable staging area for construction. This took place entirely on site. After the construction of workers' quarters on the pier, a fourth-order Fresnel lens was temporarily installed on the roof of one of the buildings. Construction was almost complete in the fall of 1873, when the onset of winter's storms forced the work site to be abandoned until the following spring. In the spring of 1874, work on the lighthouse began again. With the installation of the cast-iron lantern room and a new second-order Fresnel lens, the work was complete, and the light was put into service in June 1874.

The combination of a crib foundation with monolithic stone masonry worked so well that the Lighthouse Board used the design and a similar process in constructing the Stannard Rock Light in Lake Superior in 1878. The Board achieved economies by getting 'double duty' from the "costly apparatus and machinery purchased" for the Spectacle Reef project.

== Description ==
The location of the lighthouse makes it susceptible to wave fetch, which for this reef is 170 miles (270 km) to the southeast. Lake Huron ice fields, known as drift ice, which in this lake can be as much as two or more feet thick and measure thousands of acres in size, are moved by wintertime currents. Masses of these dimensions create "an almost irresistible force", which for Spectacle Reef Light was "overcome by interposing a structure against which the ice is crushed and by which its motion is so impeded that it grounds on the 7–foot shoal." This creates an effective wall "against other ice fields."

The tower is formed as a "frustum of a cone". The 32-foot-diameter (9.8 m) base rises 93 feet (28 m) above water level, and is 11 feet (3.4 m) below water level. As the Coast Guard notes: "The focal plane is 4 feet 3 inches (1.30 m) above the top of the parapet, making it 97 feet 3 inches (29.64 m) above the top of the submerged rock and 86 feet 3 inches (26.29 m) above the surface of the water. For 34 feet (10 m) up the tower is solid and from them on up it is hollow. In it are five rooms, one above the other each 14 feet (4.3 m) in diameter, with varying heights. The walls of the hollow portion are 5 feet 6 inches (1.68 m) at the bottom, tapering to 16 inches (410 mm) at the spring of the cornice."

Just below the cornice, the blocks of stone are 2 feet (0.61 m) thick. They are interlocked in each course, and fastened together with wrought iron bolts 2 1/2 inches (64 mm) thick and 2 feet (0.61 m) long. Likewise, the tower is bolted to the foundation rock with bolts 3 feet (0.91 m) long. After "the stones were in place they were plugged with pure portland cement, which is now as hard as the stone itself. Hence the tower is, in effect, a monolith."

The stones were cut at the depot at Scammon's Harbor, 16 miles (26 km) away. They were fitted, course by course, on a platform of masonry. The stones fit so well that each course was laid in three days: to set, drill, and bolt. The light has been described as "the best specimen of monolithic stone masonry in the United States" and "one of the greatest engineering feats on the Great Lakes." The light has an attached fog signal building, oil house and storage building. There are davits to raise and lower boats.

== History ==
In September 1872, a severe gale did considerable damage to the lighthouse, which had to be repaired at very great expense. The term "gale" is being used loosely, as there was no wind speed device being monitored in the winter at that location. But in a similar location and storm on Lake Superior at Granite Island, Michigan, wind speeds of 143 miles per hour (230 km/h) were recorded on January 18, 2003.

"After the winter of 1873–74, when the keepers returned to the newly completed tower, they found the ice piled against it at a height of 30 feet (9.1 m), or 7 feet (2.1 m) higher than the doorway, and they could not gain entrance until they had cut away the iceberg of which the lighthouse formed the core."

The Lighthouse Board built a model of this light that was featured in the Aids to Navigation display at the 1893 World's Columbian Exposition, also known as "The Chicago World's Fair" in Chicago, Illinois.

== Current status ==
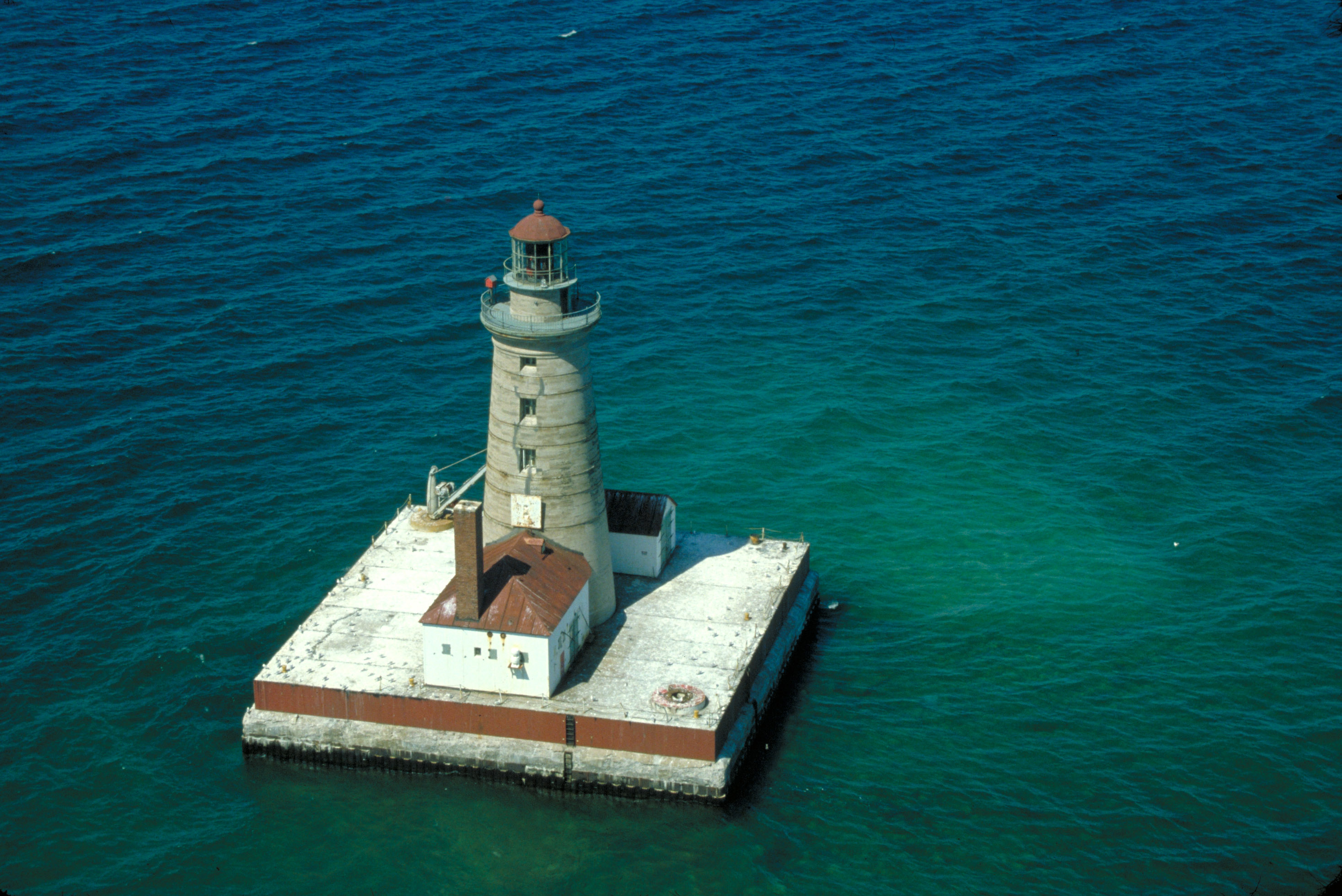
Undated aerial view by USCG

The original second-order Fresnel lens (by Henry–Lepaute of Paris, France) was removed in 1982. It is now on display at the Inland Seas Maritime Museum (also known as the Great Lakes Historical Society Museum) at the Vermilion Light in Vermilion, Ohio. Since the Fresnel lens was replaced by a modern acrylic lens, the Spectacle Reef Light has continued to serve as an active aid to navigation as of 2007.

In July 2005, "Spectacle Reef Light Station" was listed on the National Register of Historic Places as site #05000744, defined as "Located in northern Lake Huron, 10.3 miles (16.6 km). NNE of Ninemile Point, Benton Township, Michigan".

Spectacle Reef Lighthouse was one of five lighthouses chosen for the "Lighthouses of the Great Lakes" series; the postage stamp was designed by Howard Koslow in 1995. One lighthouse was chosen on each of the Great Lakes for this series. The five lighthouses are Split Rock Light on Lake Superior, St Joseph Light on Lake Michigan, Spectacle Reef Light on Lake Huron, Marblehead Light (Ohio) on Lake Erie and Thirty Mile Point Light on Lake Ontario.

In 2020, The Spectacle Reef Preservation Society was formed and swiftly began the process of restoring the lighthouse.
