= Fairport Harbor Light =

Lighthouse in Ohio, United States

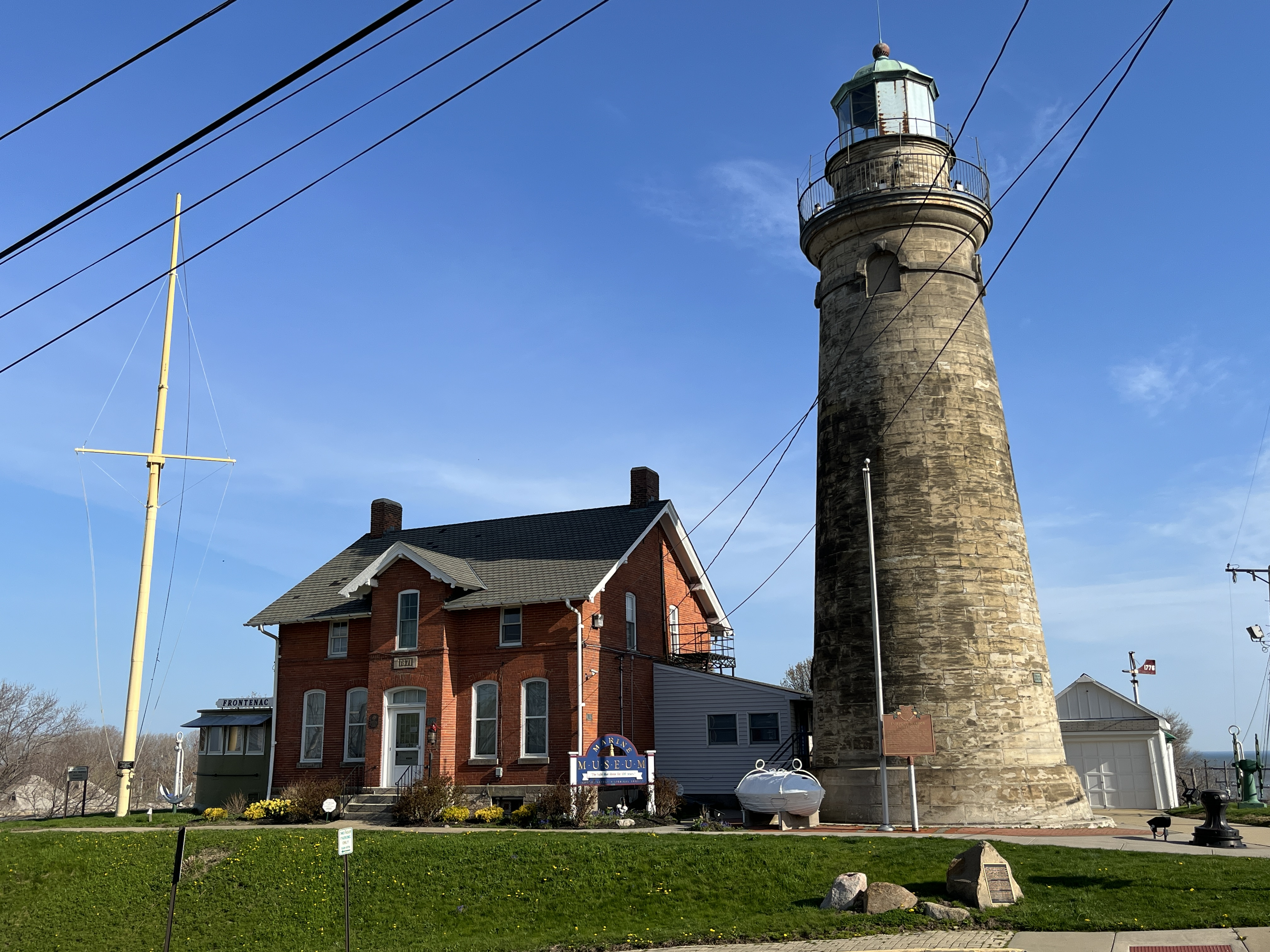
- Location: 129 2nd Street; Fairport Harbor, Ohio; United States
- Coordinates: 41°45′25.07″N 81°16′38.33″W

Tower
- Constructed: 1871
- Foundation: Dressed Stone, Timber/Piling
- Construction: Sandstone
- Height: 60 feet (18 m)
- Shape: Conical
- Heritage: Listed on the NRHP

Light
- First lit: August 11, 1871
- Deactivated: 1925
- Lens: 3rd-order Fresnel
- Characteristic: F W

U.S. National Register of Historic Places
- Official name: Fairport Marine Museum
- Designated: November 5, 1971
- Part of: Light Stations of Ohio MPS
- Reference no.: 71000642

The Fairport Harbor Light, also known as the Grand River Light, is a lighthouse located on Lake Erie in Fairport Harbor, Ohio. It is one of two lighthouses in Fairport Harbor, along with the Fairport Harbor West Breakwater Light. It consists of a 60-foot (18 m), sandstone tower with a detached, lighthouse keeper's house. The lighthouse also serves as the Fairport Harbor Marine Museum.

A lighthouse and accompanying keepers' house was first constructed in Fairport Harbor in 1825. Both were removed and replaced when a new tower and keeper's house were completed in 1871 on the same location. The light remained in service until 1925 when it was decommissioned after the West Breakwater Light went into service. It was expected that Fairport Harbor Light would then be demolished, but a letter-writing campaign by local residents preserved the structure. In 1945, ownership of the lighthouse was turned over to the village and a maritime museum was founded to conserve the site. The lighthouse and keeper's house were listed on the National Register of Historic Places in 1971.

== Location and design ==
The Fairport Harbor Light is located at the intersection of Second and High Streets in the village of Fairport Harbor, Lake County in northeast Ohio, halfway between Cleveland and Ashtabula. The lighthouse is at an elevation of 605 feet (184 m) above mean sea level and 35 feet (11 m) above the mean level of Lake Erie. When it was in operation, the lighthouse beacon was a fixed, white light with a focal height of 102 feet (31 m) above the lake. A third-order Fresnel lens was used to focus the light and was visible up to 18 miles (29 km) away; after decommissioning, the lens was moved to the adjoining maritime museum.

== History ==
The site of the village of Fairport Harbor was first deeded to settlers by the Connecticut Land Company in 1798. In the early 1800s, steamships began plying the waters of Lake Erie with the first, the Walk-in-the-Water, making a stop at Fairport Harbor in summer 1818 to disembark ten passengers using a tender due to the unimproved nature of the harbor. From May to June 1823, the steamship Superior had regular cargo and passenger service to Fairport, in addition to several schooners. The increase in ship traffic prompted residents of Fairport to begin petitioning the federal government for funding to improve the harbor, a need that was reinforced when the steamship Pioneer later ran aground in the Fairport harbor on October 1825. The U.S. Representative Elisha Whittlesey assisted in securing funding by debating the matter in Congress, and appropriation bills in 1824 and 1825 provided funding of $8,000 and of $1,000 for, respectively, the construction of a lighthouse and a pier "at the mouth of the Grand River."

=== First lighthouse ===
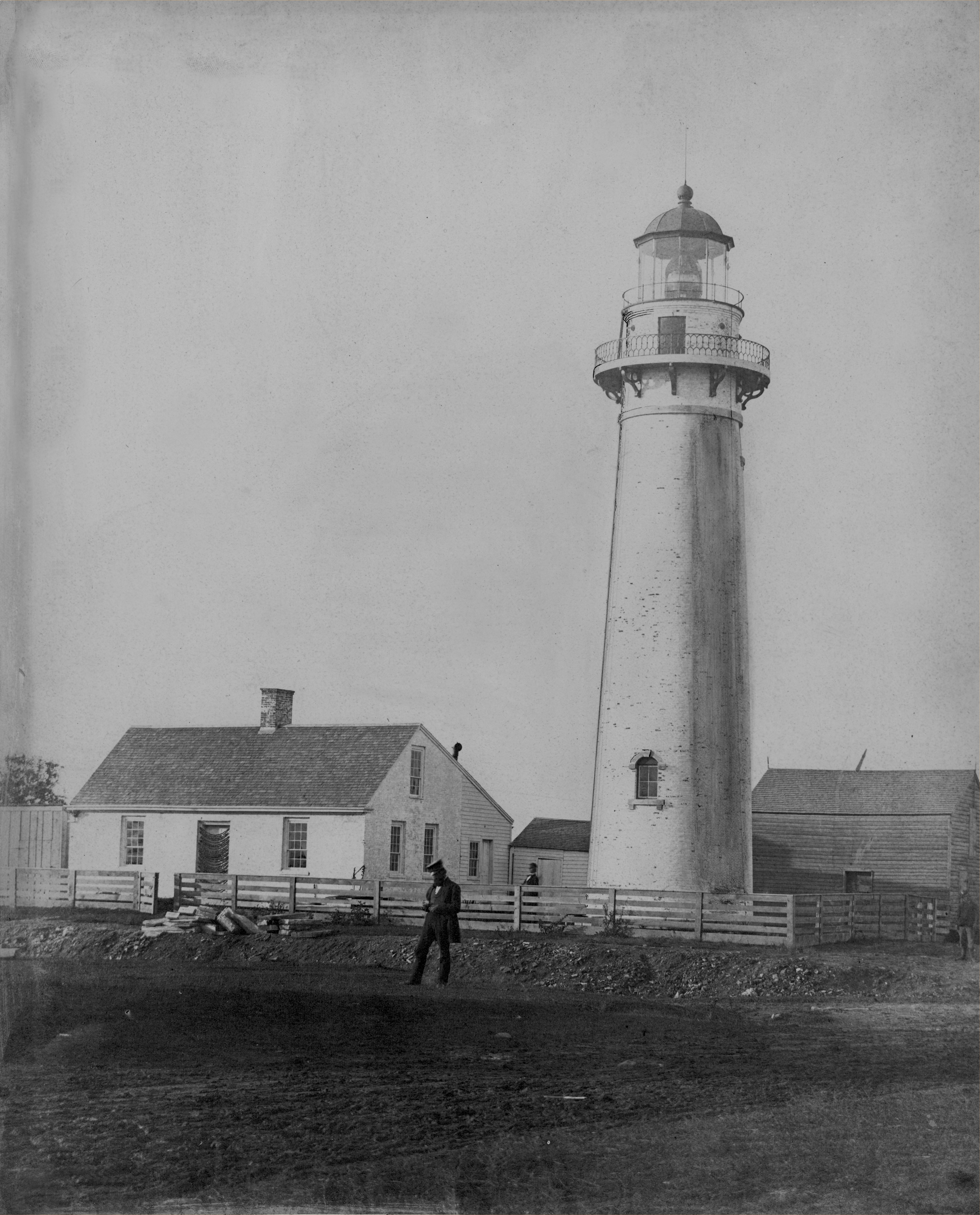
The first Fairport lighthouse and keeper's house, as constructed by Johnathan Goldsmith, in October 1859.

On March 26, 1825, a request for proposals was placed in a local newspaper for "building a Light-House and Dwelling House, at the mouth of the Grand River" by the customs collector in Cleveland. The contract for the construction was signed with local builder Johnathan Goldsmith with a completion data of "on or before" October 10, 1826. The completed lighthouse was made of whitewashed brick and was 56 feet (17 m) tall with a focal height of approximately 90 feet (30 m) above the lake. The total cost for the lighthouse and keeper's house was $5,032.41. Within ten years of its construction, the settling of the lighthouse tower required repairs to the foundation. In letters from U.S. Representative Joshua Reed Giddings in 1841, Goldsmith was also noted as being unsuccessful at petitioning for the position of lighthouse keeper at the lighthouse he built due to the Congressman's stance on patronage jobs.

By 1844, the piers in the harbor were extended to 480 yards (440 m) allowing vessels with a draft of 12 feet (3.7 m) to dock. Further enhancements to port infrastructure at Fairport were held up, after U.S. President James K. Polk exercised a presidential veto over the perceived unconstitutionality of the use of public funds on internal improvements such as harbors focused on domestic, maritime trade where the majority of which were on the Great Lakes. Public backlash over the decision lead to the Chicago River and Harbor Convention of 1847 made up of 2,300 delegates in support of federal funding—one delegate who attended was the first keeper of the Fairport Harbor Light, Samuel Butler.

=== Construction and service ===
In 1868, inspectors from the United States Lighthouse Board found the lighthouse and keeper's house to be in poor condition and recommended that they be replacement. Congress appropriated $30,000 for the construction of a replacement lighthouse on March 3, 1869. Temporary repairs were made to the tower and keeper's house to keep serviceable through the winter in 1869, while a temporary lighthouse tower was also built to operate during the removal of the original tower and was lit on December 10. Construction began on the new lighthouse on April 4, 1870, starting with a new foundation to prevent a recurrence of the problems that plagued its predecessor. Work progressed steadily with nearly two-thirds of the tower completed by September 5, 1870. Additional federal funding for the completion of the lighthouse and for the construction of the keeper's house was issued on March 3, 1871. The new lighthouse was lit for the first time on August 11, 1871; the keeper's house was not completed until October 20.

The need for a lighthouse located on a pier in the harbor, instead of one on the bluffs overlooking the lake, was recognized as early as 1838. It was not until 1917 that funding was allocated for a pierhead lighthouse. The onset of U.S. involvement in World War I paused the disbursement of funds for the new lighthouse until after the war. The cast-iron, main structure for what would become the Fairport Harbor West Breakwater Light was prefabricated in Buffalo before being transported by the steambarge Wotan, arriving in Fairport on June 21, 1921. After a lantern was added by crane, the breakwater lighthouse was lit on June 5, 1925. Subsequently, the now-obsolete Fairport Light was deactivated.

Part of the appropriations that funded the construction of the West Breakwater Light also allocated $1,600 for the demolition of the old lighthouse tower. The residents of Fairport and other local communities protested the decision to raze the structure with a regional chapters of Civitan International, the Daughters of the American Revolution, Kiwanis and other organizations, sending letters to the U.S. Secretary of Commerce Herbert Hoover, as well as entreaties from both U.S. Senators from Ohio Simeon D. Fess and Frank B. Willis. Though the government relented and allowed the lighthouse to stand, for the next 20 years it remained mostly abandoned.

=== Marine museum ===
In 1935, Congress authorized the Secretary of Commerce to dispose of the lighthouse, and transfer it and the property to the village of Fairport with the stipulation that the village convey "to the United States...free of all encumbrances, of a parcel of land...and the construction thereon without cost to the United States of a brick dwelling" for use by the United States Lighthouse Service. The village, however, was unable to fulfill the terms set by the government to receive the lighthouse (i.e. providing property and a suitable house) due a shortage of funds. In July 1941, the United States Coast Guard, successor to the Lighthouse Service, opted to lease the lighthouse to the village for a period of five years. The lease was renewed for a second, five-year period in July 1946.The Fairport Marine Museum was founded by the Fairport Historical Society in 1945. The museum was officially dedicated on July 2, 1946 as part of the 150th anniversary of the founding of Fairport village. Ownership of the lighthouse was transferred from the federal government to the village government in 1953, who then leased it to the Historical Society. The museum and the lighthouse were listed on the National Register of Historic Places on November 5, 1971.

The museum features exhibits about the history of the lighthouse and its keepers, a Fresnel lens, lifesaving equipment, life on the Great Lakes, ship models and maritime artifacts. The former pilothouse from the Great Lakes carrier the Frontenac is attached to the museum's building. The museum is open seasonally, and is located at 129 Second Street. The lighthouse and museum are alleged to be haunted by a ghost cat and was featured on an episode of My Ghost Story on The Biography Channel in 2011. During the solar eclipse of April 8, 2024, the Fairport Harbor Light was situated within and near the center of the path of totality, experiencing 3 minutes, 52 seconds of darkness. It was also the site of the community's viewing party for the eclipse, which included a viewing from the lighthouse tower balcony.

== See also ==
- List of maritime museums in the United States
- National Register of Historic Places in Lake County, Ohio

== Sources ==
- DeWire, Elinor (Winter 2009). "Fairport Harbor Lighthouse: The Freedom Light" (PDF). The Keeper's Log. 25 (2). San Francisco: United States Lighthouse Society: 2–11. ISSN 0883-0061.
- Fairport Harbor Bicentennial Committee (1976). A History of Fairport Harbor. Fairport Harbor, Ohio: Lake Photo Engraving Inc.
- Harrison, Timothy (October 2001). "The Lights and Lost Lights of Fairport Harbor". Lighthouse Digest.
- Killinen, Pearl E (April 25, 1971). "Fairport Marine Museum". National Register of Historic Places Inventory—Nomination Form. National Archives and Records Administration. NAID 71989611.
- Lupold, Harry Forrest (Summer 1981). "Fairport: The Transformation of a Lake Erie Port, 1812–1870". Inland Seas. 37 (2). Vermilion, Ohio: Great Lakes Historical Society: 90–101. ISSN 0020-1537.
- Williams Brothers (1878). A History of Geauga and Lake Counties, Ohio. Philadelphia: J. B. Lippincott & Co.
