= Fairport Harbor West Breakwater Light =

Lighthouse in Ohio, United States

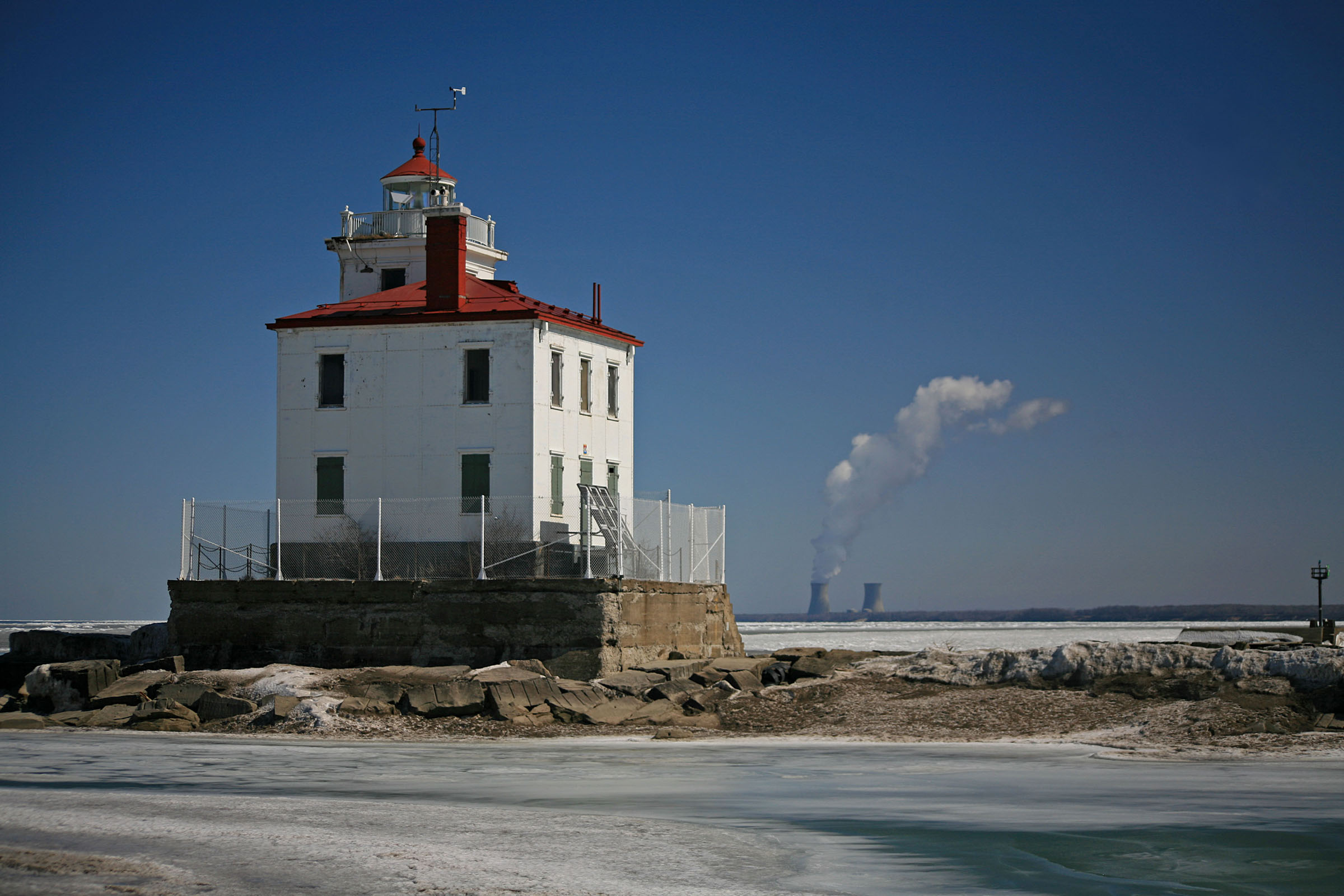
- Fairport Harbor West Breakwater Light at the entrance to the Grand River on Lake Erie
- Location: Fairport Harbor, Ohio; United States
- Coordinates: 41°46′4.33″N 81°16′52.22″W

Tower
- Constructed: 1925
- Foundation: Concrete pier
- Construction: Brick with steel frame
- Height: 42 feet (13 m)
- Shape: Square
- Markings: White tower with red roof
- Heritage: Listed on the NRHP

Light
- First lit: 1925
- Focal height: 56 feet (17 m)
- Lens: 4th-order Fresnel
- Range: 13 nmi (24 km; 15 mi)
- Characteristic: Iso W 6s

U.S. National Register of Historic Places
- Designated: April 10, 1992
- Part of: Light Stations of Ohio MPS
- Reference no.: 92000242

The Fairport Harbor West Breakwater Light is a lighthouse on Lake Erie located at the end of a breakwater near the mouth of the Grand River in the U.S. state of Ohio. Along with the Fairport Harbor Light, it is one of two lighthouses near Fairport Harbor and was built in 1925 to replace the other located within the village.

The light is automated and closed to the public. However, it is possible to walk out along the breakwater to view the structure and grounds. It was added to the National Register of Historic Places on April 10, 1992.

In 2006, an effort began by a group of community activists to take ownership of the lighthouse with the goal of preserving the facility for future generations. The United States Coast Guard will continue to maintain the light and foghorn as a navigational aid.

In September 2009, the United States General Services Administration put the lighthouse up for public auction via an online auction. After two more auctions, a bidder secured the lighthouse in August 2011 and converted it into a summer residence.

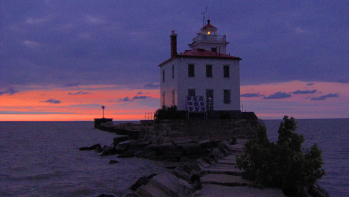
