= Huron Harbor Light =

Lighthouse in Ohio, US

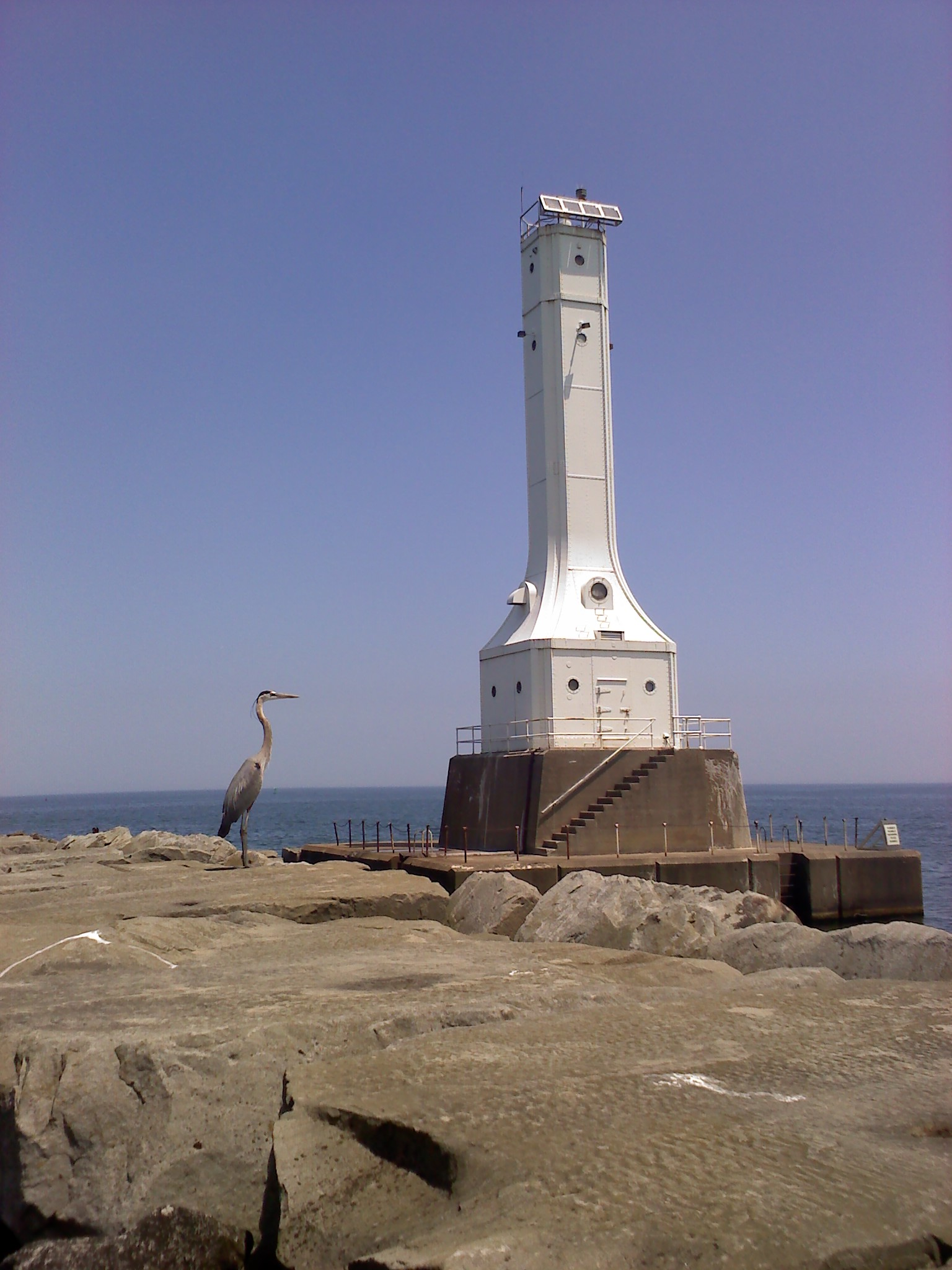
- Huron Harbor Light
- Location: Huron, Ohio, United States
- Coordinates: 41°24′16.59″N 82°32′37.65″W

Tower
- Constructed: 1939
- Foundation: cement
- Height: 22 m (72 ft)
- Shape: Square
- Heritage: National Register of Historic Places listed place

Light
- First lit: 1936
- Focal height: 24 m (79 ft)
- Range: 10 nmi (19 km; 12 mi)
- Characteristic: Iso W 6s

The Huron Harbor Light is a lighthouse in Huron, Ohio on Lake Erie, on the west pier of the Huron Harbor.
