= Crib lighthouse =

Type of lighthouse

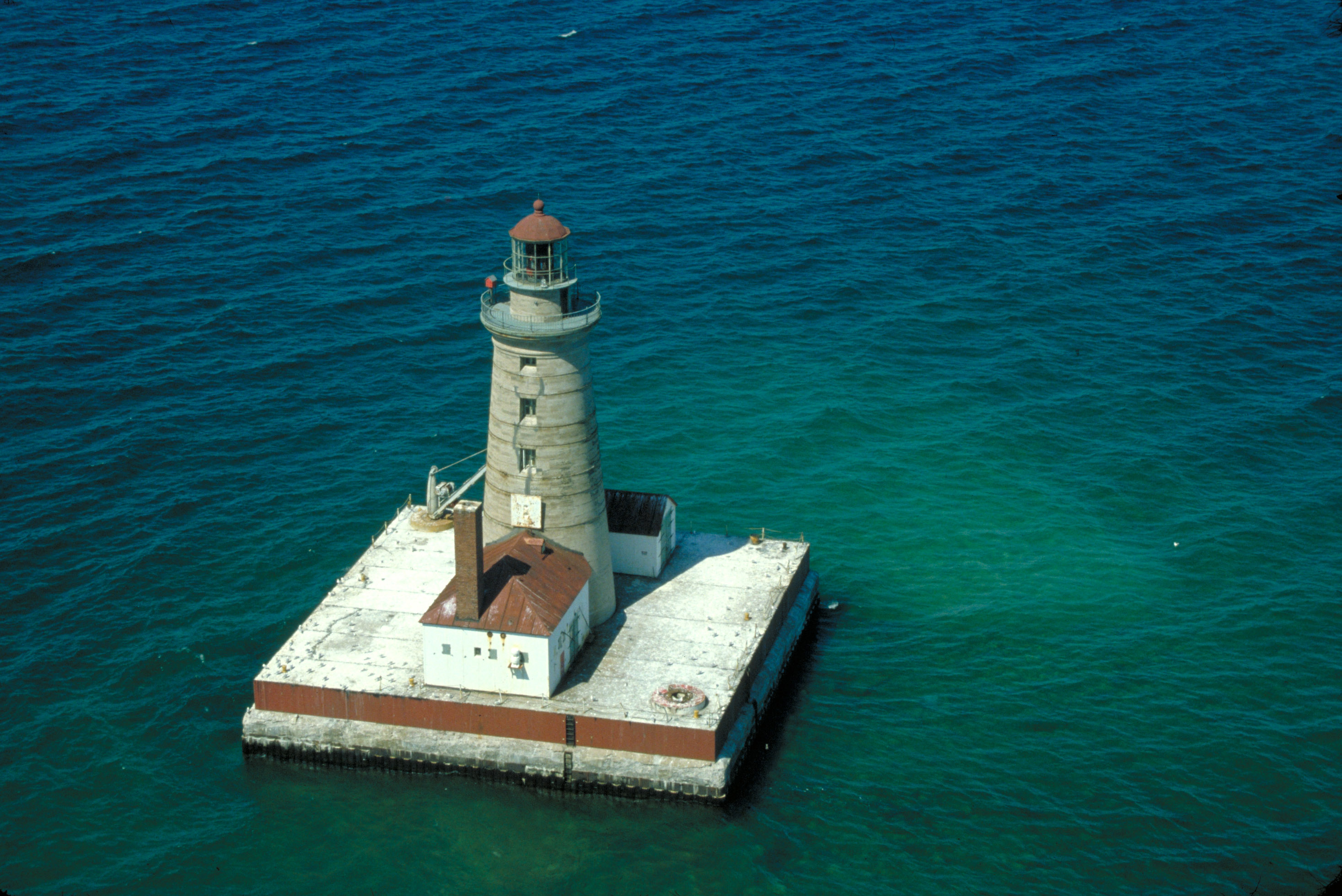
Spectacle Reef Light rests on a "crib" foundation

A crib lighthouse is a type of lighthouse whose structure rests on a concrete or masonry foundation supported with wooden beams. The name "crib" refers to the wooden crib pier style of construction which was used as a foundation for lighthouses. When it came time to build, wooden cribs were constructed onshore then towed to the site where they were filled with stone so they sank in place. The crib was then leveled and capped with concrete or masonry on which the lighthouse structure was constructed. Crib lighthouses were built extensively in the Great Lakes region, as the hardrock bottoms of these water bodies provided ideal foundations. Problems arose however if the crib settled unevenly into the earth as was the case with the Detroit River Light.

The Spectacle Reef Light is an example of this type of structure.

== See also ==
- Water crib
