= Lake County, Ohio =

County in Ohio, United States

- County
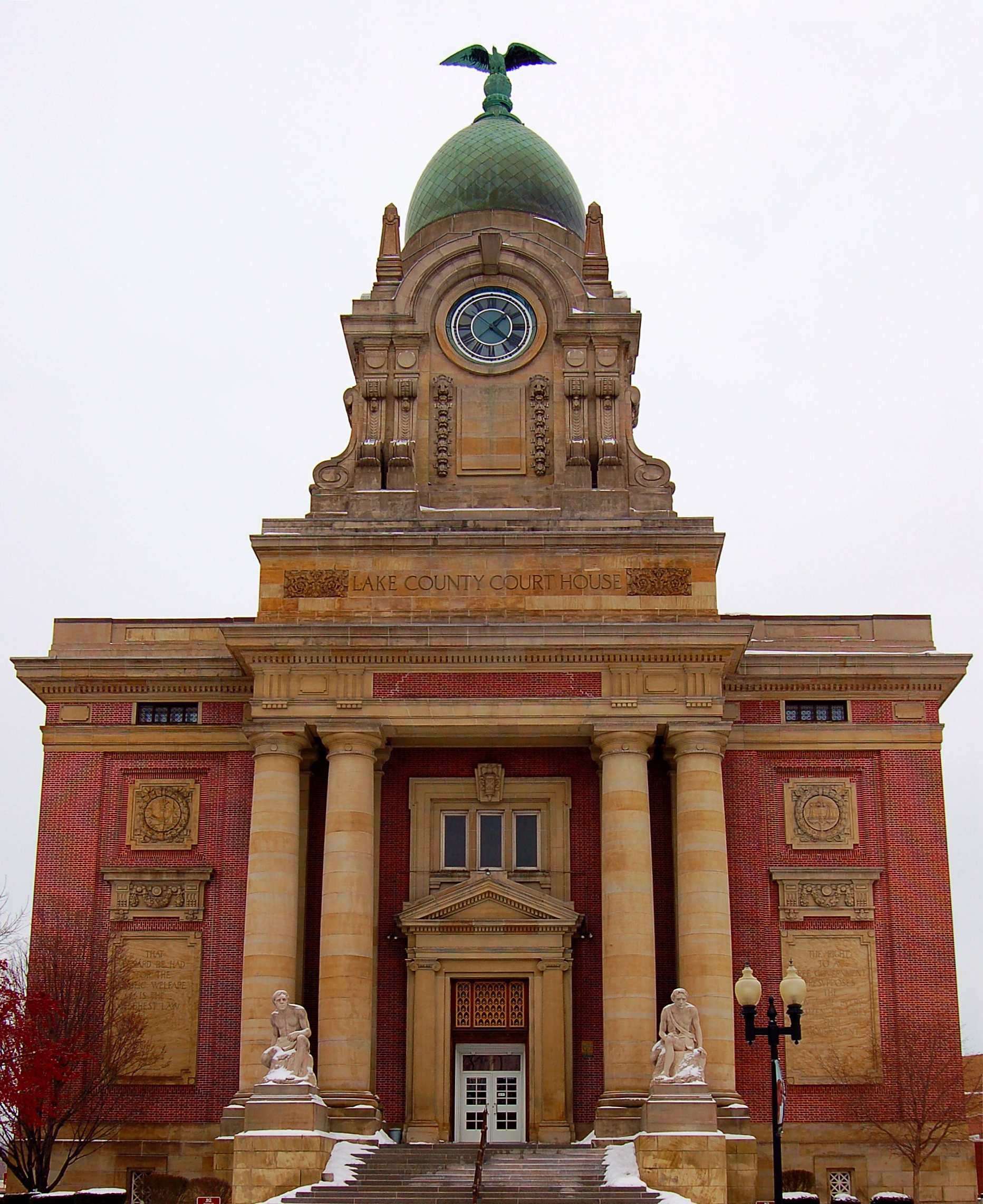
- Lake County Courthouse

- Flag Seal Logo

- Location within the U.S. state of Ohio
- Coordinates: 41°49′N 81°14′W
- Country: United States
- State: Ohio
- Founded: March 6, 1840
- Named for: Lake Erie
- Seat: Painesville
- Largest city: Mentor

Area
  - Total: 979 sq mi (2,540 km^{2})
  - Land: 227 sq mi (590 km^{2})
  - Water: 752 sq mi (1,950 km^{2}) 77%

Population (2020)
  - Total: 232,603
  - Estimate (2025): 232,217 ▼
  - Density: 1,020/sq mi (396/km^{2})
- Time zone: UTC−5 (Eastern)
  - Summer (DST): UTC−4 (EDT)
- Congressional district: 14th
- Website: www.lakecountyohio.gov

Lake County is a county in the U.S. state of Ohio. As of the 2020 census, the population was 232,603. Its county seat is Painesville, and its largest city is Mentor.

The county was established on March 6, 1840, from land given by Cuyahoga and Geauga counties. Its name is derived from its location on the southern shore of Lake Erie and the fact that the majority of the county’s land lies beneath Lake Erie. Lake County is part of the Cleveland, OH Metropolitan Statistical Area.

== History ==
The land that became Lake County was home to the indigenous Erie people prior to the arrival of the French in the region during the early 1600s and was considered by the French to be part of their Colony of New France. After France's defeat in the Seven Years' War in 1763, France ceded the area to Great Britain, and the area became part of the Province of Quebec through the Quebec Act of 1774. Following the American Revolutionary War, it became part of the Connecticut Western Reserve in the Northwest Territory, then was purchased by the Connecticut Land Company in 1795. It was separated out of Geauga County in March 1840.

Although today the county is mostly suburban, Lake County was once known as a rural country retreat for wealthy Cleveland residents. During the early 1900s, many wealthy families in Cleveland maintained large estates in the county for use as their summer homes.

== Geography ==
According to the United States Census Bureau, the county has an area of 979 square miles (2,540 km^{2}), of which 227 square miles (590 km^{2}) is land and 752 square miles (1,950 km^{2}) (77%) is water. It is Ohio's smallest county by land area but the third-largest by total area, with said area owing to land beneath the lake (which is owned by the county).

The county’s coast line along Lake Erie spans 31 miles. Additionally, Lake County has an international border with Ontario (across Lake Erie).

=== Adjacent counties ===
- Ashtabula County (east)
- Geauga County (south)
- Cuyahoga County (southwest)

=== Physical geography ===
Ridges on the Lake Plain physiographic region, and on which some roads are laid, are beaches formed by the various glacial lakes which occurred as the glaciers receded. Lake Maumee was the highest glacial lake at about 760 feet, and left Maumee II beach. Whittlesey beach, formed by Lake Whittlesey at 740 feet, is known as South Ridge. Arkona beach (Lake Arkona) is Middle Ridge, and occurs at about 690 feet. North Ridge is the remnant of Warren beach (Lake Warren), at an elevation of 685 feet. Elkton beach is the northernmost ridge, at 625 feet, an occurred at the time of Lake Elkton. Lake Shore Boulevard follows Elkton beach in Mentor Township.

Mentor Marsh, an abandoned channel of the Grand River, is an Ohio State Nature Preserve.

== Demographics ==
Historical population
Census	Pop.	Note	%±
1840	13,719		—
1850	14,654		6.8%
1860	15,576		6.3%
1870	15,935		2.3%
1880	16,326		2.5%
1890	18,235		11.7%
1900	21,680		18.9%
1910	22,927		5.8%
1920	28,667		25.0%
1930	41,674		45.4%
1940	50,020		20.0%
1950	75,979		51.9%
1960	148,700		95.7%
1970	197,200		32.6%
1980	212,801		7.9%
1990	215,499		1.3%
2000	227,511		5.6%
2010	230,041		1.1%
2020	232,603		1.1%
2025 (est.)	232,217	▼	−0.2%
U.S. Decennial Census; 1790–1960 1900–1990; 1990–2000 2010–2020

=== 2020 census ===
As of the 2020 census, Lake County had 232,603 people living in 99,590 households. The median age was 44.7 years, 19.5% of residents were under the age of 18, and 21.1% were 65 years of age or older. For every 100 females there were 95.0 males, and for every 100 females age 18 and over there were 92.8 males age 18 and over.

Of those households, 25.1% had children under the age of 18 living in them, 46.1% were married-couple households, 19.0% were households with a male householder and no spouse or partner present, and 28.0% were households with a female householder and no spouse or partner present. About 31.3% of all households were made up of individuals and 14.2% had someone living alone who was 65 years of age or older.

There were 105,315 housing units, of which 5.4% were vacant. Among occupied housing units, 74.2% were owner-occupied and 25.8% were renter-occupied. The homeowner vacancy rate was 1.3% and the rental vacancy rate was 6.8%.

92.5% of residents lived in urban areas, while 7.5% lived in rural areas.

The racial makeup of the county was 85.7% White, 4.7% Black or African American, 0.2% American Indian and Alaska Native, 1.4% Asian, <0.1% Native Hawaiian and Pacific Islander, 2.4% from some other race, and 5.5% from two or more races. Hispanic or Latino residents of any race comprised 4.9% of the population.

In terms of ancestry, 23.0% were German, 18.0% were Irish, 15.3% were Italian, 9.8% were English, and 6.8% were Polish.

33.0% of the adult population has a Bachelor's Degree or higher, slightly above the 32.0% rate for Ohio as a whole.

=== Racial and ethnic composition ===
Lake County, Ohio – Racial and ethnic composition Note: the US Census treats Hispanic/Latino as an ethnic category. This table excludes Latinos from the racial categories and assigns them to a separate category. Hispanics/Latinos may be of any race.
Race / ethnicity (NH = Non-Hispanic)	Pop 1980	Pop 1990	Pop 2000	Pop 2010	Pop 2020	% 1980	% 1990	% 2000	% 2010	% 2020
White alone (NH)	207,140	208,835	214,881	208,994	197,069	97.34%	96.91%	94.45%	90.85%	84.72%
Black or African American alone (NH)	2,920	3,461	4,447	7,156	10,778	1.37%	1.61%	1.95%	3.11%	4.63%
Native American or Alaska Native alone (NH)	202	240	226	234	236	0.09%	0.11%	0.10%	0.10%	0.10%
Asian alone (NH)	1,152	1,416	2,034	2,586	3,255	0.54%	0.66%	0.89%	1.12%	1.40%
Native Hawaiian or Pacific Islander alone (NH)	x	x	37	31	38	x	x	0.02%	0.01%	0.02%
Other race alone (NH)	289	78	142	175	604	0.14%	0.04%	0.06%	0.08%	0.26%
Mixed race or Multiracial (NH)	x	x	1,865	3,040	9,261	x	x	0.82%	1.32%	3.98%
Hispanic or Latino (any race)	1,098	1,469	3,879	7,825	11,362	0.52%	0.68%	1.70%	3.40%	4.88%
Total	212,801	215,499	227,511	230,041	232,603	100.00%	100.00%	100.00%	100.00%	100.00%

=== 2010 census ===
As of the 2010 census, there were 230,041 people, 94,156 households, and 62,384 families residing in the county. The population density was 1,011.2 inhabitants per square mile (390.4/km^{2}). There were 101,202 housing units at an average density of 444.9 units per square mile (171.8 units/km^{2}). The racial makeup of the county was 92.5% white, 3.2% black or African American, 1.1% Asian, 0.1% American Indian, 1.6% from other races, and 1.5% from two or more races. Those of Hispanic or Latino origin made up 3.4% of the population. In terms of ancestry, 26.4% were German, 18.9% were Irish, 16.4% were Italian, 11.5% were English, 7.6% were Polish, 5.4% were Hungarian, and 3.9% were American.

Of the 94,156 households, 29.4% had children under the age of 18 living with them, 50.5% were married couples living together, 11.2% had a female householder with no husband present, 33.7% were non-families, and 28.3% of all households were made up of individuals. The average household size was 2.41 and the average family size was 2.97. The median age was 42.3 years.

The median income for a household in the county was $54,896 and the median income for a family was $67,206. Males had a median income of $49,240 versus $36,906 for females. The per capita income for the county was $28,221. About 6.0% of families and 8.1% of the population were below the poverty line, including 13.0% of those under age 18 and 4.4% of those age 65 or over.

In 2010, 92.4% spoke English, 2.7% Spanish, and 1.4% Croatian.

== Environment ==
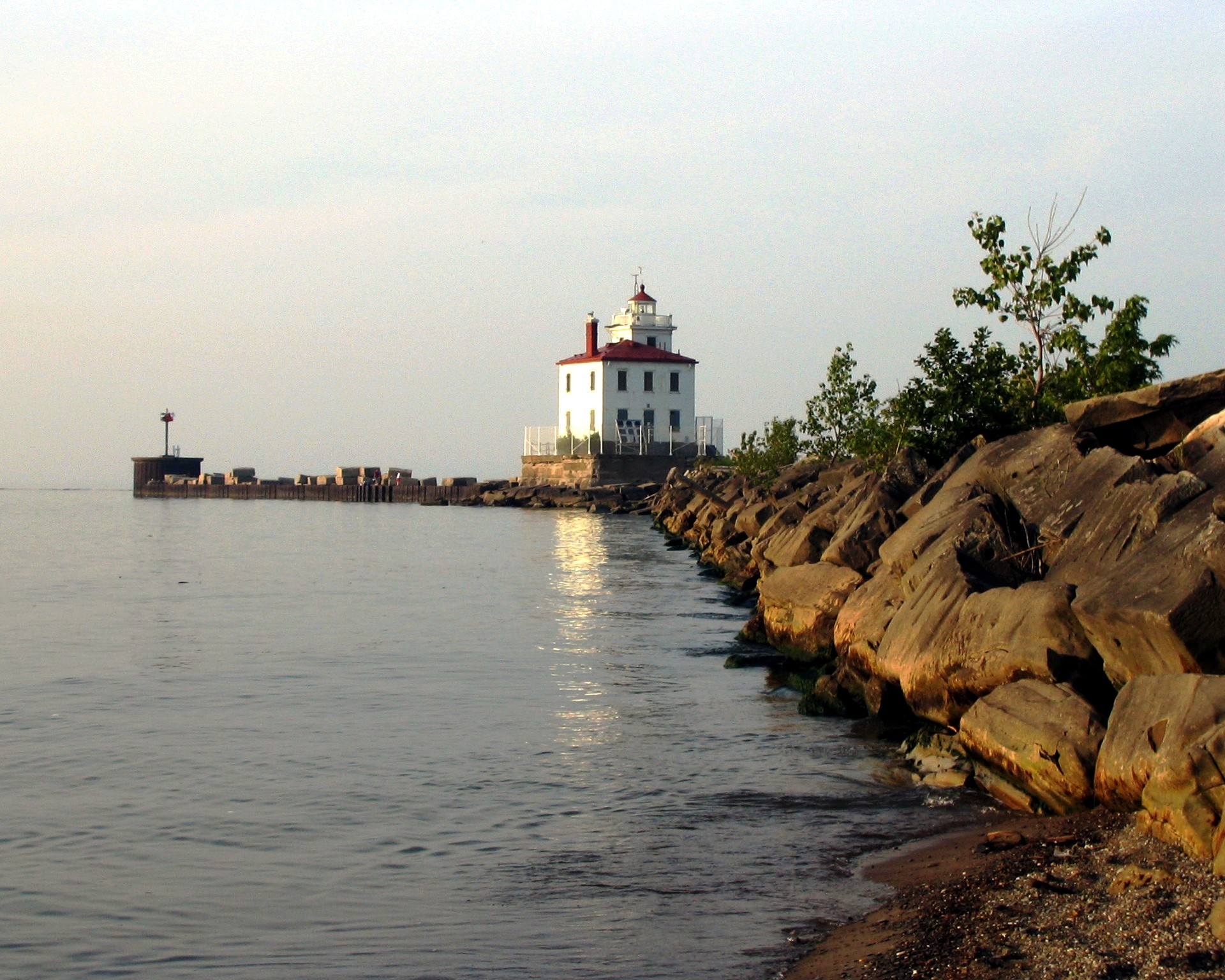
Fairport Harbor West Breakwater Light, Fairport Harbor viewed from the Headlands Dunes State Nature Preserve

Scorecard’s 2002 report ranks Lake County among the worst 10% of counties in the U.S. in terms of cancer risk, developmental and reproductive toxicants, and other categories as well. This rating is comparable with most major cities and densely populated areas. In 2004, Scorecard ranked the county among the cleanest or best 10% of all counties in the U.S. in terms of the number of designated Superfund sites.

Lake County has a large public park system, including Lake Metroparks Farmpark. Kirtland is home to the Holden Arboretum and Gildersleeve Mountain. Headlands Beach State Park is in Mentor. The Grand River is a state wild and scenic river, and the Chagrin River is a state scenic river.

== Transportation ==
Laketran is the transit agency that serves Lake County, providing bus service throughout the county and to downtown Cleveland. It is the third-largest transit system in Northeast Ohio. In 2025, the system had a ridership of 698,500, or about 3,000 per weekday as of the second quarter of 2026.

The Lake County Executive Airport is located three nautical miles (3.5 mi; 5.6 km) north of Willoughby's central business district.

Interstate 90 runs northeast–southwest through Lake County, roughly parallel to State Route 2; along with the north–south State Route 44 connects the two together. These freeways make up the major traffic arteries in the county.

Lake County does not have passenger rail service, though Amtrak's New York City-Chicago Lake Shore Limited service schedules an eastbound and westbound train through Lake County nightly with stops at Cleveland and Erie. CSX and Norfolk Southern provide railroad main line through-freight service. The recently formed Grand River Railroad, operating on former Baltimore & Ohio track, serves the Fairport Harbor area linking the Morton Salt plant with CSX at Painesville.

=== Major highways ===
- I-90
- I-271
- US 6
- US 20
- SR 2
- SR 44
- SR 84
- SR 86
- SR 91
- SR 174
- SR 283
- SR 306
- SR 307
- SR 528
- SR 535
- SR 608
- SR 615
- SR 633
- SR 640

== Education ==
=== Post-secondary institutions ===
- Lake Erie College in Painesville
- Lakeland Community College in Kirtland
- Saint Mary Seminary and Graduate School of Theology in Wickliffe

=== Public schools ===
The following public school districts are located in Lake County:

- Fairport Harbor Exempted Village School District (serving Fairport Harbor and Painesville Township (portion))
  - Fairport Harding High School
- Kirtland Local School District (serving Kirtland, Kirtland Hills (portion), Waite Hill (portion), and Willoughby (portion))
  - Kirtland High School
- Madison Local School District (serving Madison and Madison Township)
  - Madison High School
- Mentor Public Schools (serving Concord Township (portion), Kirtland Hills (portion), Mentor, and Mentor-on-the-Lake)
  - Mentor High School
- Painesville City Local School District (serving Painesville)
  - Thomas W. Harvey High School
- Perry Local School District (serving North Perry, Perry, and Perry Township)
  - Perry High School
- Riverside Local School District (serving Concord Township (portion), Grand River, Leroy Township, and Painesville Township)
  - Riverside High School
- Wickliffe City School District (serving Wickliffe)
  - Wickliffe High School
- Willoughby-Eastlake City School District (serving Eastlake, Lakeline, Timberlake, Waite Hill (portion), Willoughby, Willoughby Hills, and Willowick)
  - North High School in Eastlake
  - South High School in Willoughby

Additionally, the Chardon Local School District has some territory in the county.

=== Private schools ===
- Andrews Osborne Academy, a private, coeducational boarding and day school for Grades Pre-K through 12 in Willoughby
- Cornerstone Christian Academy in Willoughby Hills
- Lake Catholic High School in Mentor
- Telshe Yeshiva in Wickliffe
- Mentor Christian School in Mentor

== Libraries ==
The following libraries serve Lake County:

- Fairport Harbor Public Library in Fairport Harbor
- Kirtland Public Library in Kirtland
- Madison Public Library in Madison
- Mentor Public Library in Mentor
- Morley Library in Painesville
- Perry Public Library in Perry
- Wickliffe Public Library in Wickliffe
- Willoughby-Eastlake Public Library, headquartered in Eastlake and with branches in Willoughby, Willoughby Hills, and Willowick.

Additionally, as of 2019, all Lake County libraries are all CLEVNET members.

== Media ==
Lake County is part of the Cleveland-area media and television market.

The News-Herald, a Lake County newspaper, has been headquartered in Willoughby since its inception.

== Government ==
Lake County leans strongly Republican in local elections. As of 2024, all but one county-wide elected officials are Republicans.

Lake County Elected Officials
Position	Name	Party
Commissioner	John Plecnik	Republican
Commissioner	Richard Regovich	Republican
Commissioner	John Hamercheck	Republican
Auditor	Christopher Galloway	Republican
Prosecuting Attorney	Charles Coulson	Republican
Clerk of Courts	Faith Andrews	Republican
Sheriff	Frank Leonbruno	Republican
Recorder	Becky Lynch	Republican
Treasurer	Michael Zuren	Republican
Engineer	James Gills	Republican
Coroner	David Keep	Republican

Lake County Judges
Position	Name	Party
Common Pleas - General	Patrick Condon	Republican
Common Pleas - General	Vincent Culotta	Republican
Common Pleas - General	Jeffrey Ruple	Republican
Common Pleas - General	John O'Donnell	Republican
Domestic Relations Division	Colleen Falkowski	Democrat
Juvenile Division	Michael DeLeone	Republican
Probate Division	Mark Bartolotta	Republican

== Politics ==
Lake County has traditionally been known as a "purple" or "swing" county within the state. A 2008 analysis of Ohio presidential election results from 1960 to 2004 found no other county more closely followed Ohio's statewide voting pattern. Although it did not always vote with the winner, it had consistently been closer to the winner's Ohio vote percentage than any other Ohio county. More recently, however, the county has trended more strongly Republican than the state as a whole. For example, in 2020 Republican presidential candidate Donald Trump won the county by nearly a fourteen point margin while winning the state as a whole by only eight points.

United States presidential election results for Lake County, Ohio
Year	Republican		Democratic		Third party(ies)	
Year	No.	%	No.	%	No.	%
1856	2,371	78.04%	628	20.67%	39	1.28%
1860	2,521	77.74%	622	19.18%	100	3.08%
1864	2,787	82.63%	586	17.37%	0	0.00%
1868	2,909	76.59%	889	23.41%	0	0.00%
1872	2,751	73.56%	979	26.18%	10	0.27%
1876	2,941	71.28%	1,141	27.65%	44	1.07%
1880	2,978	71.06%	1,104	26.34%	109	2.60%
1884	2,925	69.64%	1,120	26.67%	155	3.69%
1888	2,987	68.37%	1,157	26.48%	225	5.15%
1892	2,846	67.46%	1,158	27.45%	215	5.10%
1896	3,745	68.40%	1,682	30.72%	48	0.88%
1900	3,929	68.41%	1,733	30.18%	81	1.41%
1904	3,824	76.42%	871	17.41%	309	6.18%
1908	3,635	66.97%	1,605	29.57%	188	3.46%
1912	1,155	22.91%	1,429	28.34%	2,458	48.75%
1916	2,887	51.39%	2,596	46.21%	135	2.40%
1920	7,465	72.31%	2,711	26.26%	147	1.42%
1924	7,727	70.71%	974	8.91%	2,226	20.37%
1928	11,823	74.24%	4,024	25.27%	79	0.50%
1932	11,792	61.43%	6,801	35.43%	603	3.14%
1936	9,386	43.24%	11,213	51.66%	1,108	5.10%
1940	13,464	52.04%	12,408	47.96%	0	0.00%
1944	13,697	51.86%	12,713	48.14%	0	0.00%
1948	12,973	53.81%	10,844	44.98%	291	1.21%
1952	23,483	60.48%	15,346	39.52%	0	0.00%
1956	31,017	61.14%	19,718	38.86%	0	0.00%
1960	32,038	48.94%	33,425	51.06%	0	0.00%
1964	23,282	37.65%	38,552	62.35%	0	0.00%
1968	28,450	43.40%	27,932	42.61%	9,177	14.00%
1972	42,488	58.90%	27,523	38.15%	2,130	2.95%
1976	36,390	45.83%	40,734	51.30%	2,284	2.88%
1980	43,485	50.31%	35,246	40.78%	7,697	8.91%
1984	54,587	59.12%	36,711	39.76%	1,027	1.11%
1988	52,963	56.63%	39,667	42.41%	894	0.96%
1992	40,766	38.46%	37,682	35.55%	27,542	25.99%
1996	40,974	41.92%	43,186	44.19%	13,576	13.89%
2000	51,747	50.45%	46,497	45.33%	4,320	4.21%
2004	62,193	51.05%	59,049	48.47%	581	0.48%
2008	59,142	48.62%	60,155	49.45%	2,345	1.93%
2012	58,744	49.50%	57,680	48.61%	2,241	1.89%
2016	64,255	54.83%	46,397	39.59%	6,538	5.58%
2020	73,278	56.03%	55,514	42.45%	1,990	1.52%
2024	72,924	56.46%	54,484	42.18%	1,751	1.36%

United States Senate election results for Lake County, Ohio1
Year	Republican		Democratic		Third party(ies)	
Year	No.	%	No.	%	No.	%
2024	64,089	50.76%	58,125	46.04%	4,045	3.20%

== Communities ==
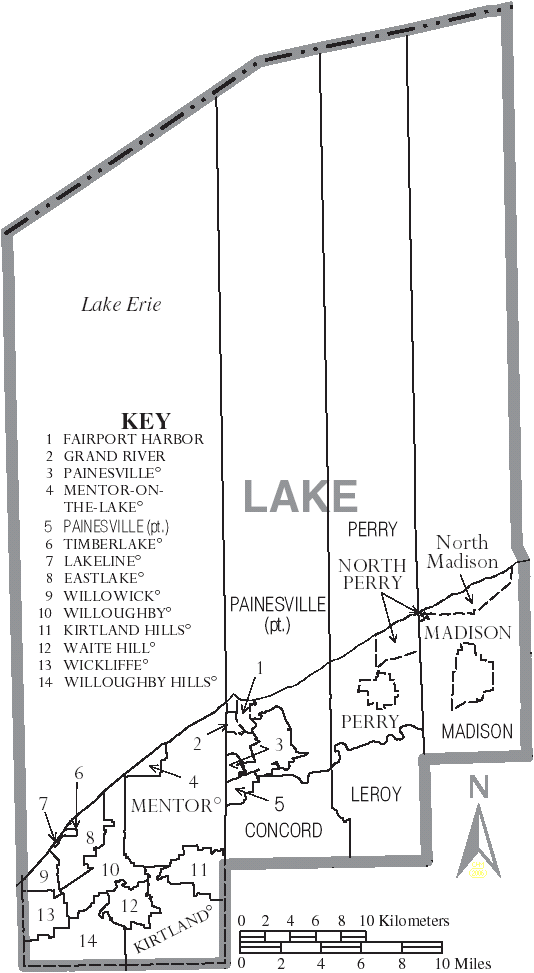
Map of Lake County, Ohio with Municipal and Township Labels

=== Cities ===
- Eastlake
- Kirtland
- Mentor
- Mentor-on-the-Lake
- Painesville (county seat)
- Wickliffe
- Willoughby
- Willoughby Hills
- Willowick

=== Villages ===
- Fairport Harbor
- Grand River
- Kirtland Hills
- Lakeline
- Madison
- North Perry
- Perry
- Timberlake
- Waite Hill

=== Townships ===
- Concord
- Leroy
- Madison
- Painesville
- Perry

=== Census-designated place ===
- North Madison

=== Unincorporated communities ===
- Painesville-on-the-Lake
- Unionville

== Points of Interest ==
Holden Arboretum, one of the largest arboreta and botanical gardens in the United States, is located in Kirtland.

The James A. Garfield National Historic Site is located in Mentor. The site preserves the Lawnfield estate and surrounding property of James A. Garfield, the 20th president of the United States, and includes the first presidential library established in the United States.

Kirtland Temple, the first temple built by adherents of the Latter Day Saint movement, is located in Kirtland. Kirtland, which served as the headquarters for the Latter Day Saint movement during most of the 1830s, also hosts the nearby Historic Kirtland Village, which is owned and operated by the Church of Jesus Christ of Latter-day Saints and is made up of historic buildings and sites important to the early Latter Day Saint movement.

Several other historic churches are located in the county, including the Methodist Episcopal Church of Painesville, Old South Church in Kirtland, St. James Episcopal Church in Painesville, and the South LeRoy Meetinghouse in Leroy Township.

A portion of the Grand River Valley American Viticultural Area is located in the eastern half of the county.

Squire's Castle is located within the North Chagrin Reservation of the Cleveland Metroparks in Willoughby Hills.

Classic Park, the home field of the Lake County Captains, a Class A minor league baseball team affiliated with the Cleveland Guardians, is located in Eastlake.

== See also ==
- Burning River Buckets, 2023 ABA Champions
- Melon heads, a local urban legend
- National Register of Historic Places listings in Lake County, Ohio
- Historic Country Estates in Lake County, Ohio
