= National Register of Historic Places listings in Lake County, Ohio =

Location of Lake County in Ohio

This is a list of the National Register of Historic Places listings in Lake County, Ohio.

This is intended to be a complete list of the properties and districts on the National Register of Historic Places in Lake County, Ohio, United States. The locations of National Register properties and districts for which the latitude and longitude coordinates are included below, may be seen in an online map.

There are 81 properties and districts listed on the National Register in the county, including 2 National Historic Landmarks.

This National Park Service list is complete through NPS recent listings posted August 7, 2026.

== Current listings ==
	Name on the Register	Image	Date listed	Location	City or town	Description
1	Administration Building, Lake Erie College	Administration Building, Lake Erie College	March 20, 1973 (#73001486)	391 W. Washington St. 41°43′03″N 81°15′06″W	Painesville	
2	Julia F. Boyce Country Estate	Julia F. Boyce Country Estate	July 24, 2023 (#100009151)	37813-19 Euclid Ave. 41°38′03″N 81°24′43″W	Willoughby	
3	Brick Vernacular House No. 1	Brick Vernacular House No. 1	October 20, 1980 (#80003108)	98 Lake St. 41°46′24″N 81°02′50″W	Madison	
4	Brick Vernacular House No. 2	Brick Vernacular House No. 2	October 20, 1980 (#80003109)	120 N. Lake St. 41°46′26″N 81°02′50″W	Madison	
5	Casement House	Casement House	July 30, 1975 (#75001454)	436 Casement Ave. 41°44′11″N 81°13′39″W	Painesville Township	
6	Cheese-vat Factory	Cheese-vat Factory	October 20, 1980 (#80003110)	16 Eagle St. 41°46′18″N 81°03′05″W	Madison	
7	Alpha Charles Childs House	Alpha Charles Childs House	October 20, 1980 (#80003111)	319 W. Main St. 41°46′14″N 81°03′17″W	Madison	
8	Robertus W. Childs House	Robertus W. Childs House	October 20, 1980 (#80003112)	307 W. Main St. 41°46′14″N 81°03′16″W	Madison	
9	Connecticut Land Company Office	Connecticut Land Company Office	August 14, 1973 (#73001491)	7877 E. Main St. in Unionville; 41°46′48″N 81°00′18″W	Madison Township	
10	Corning-White House	Corning-White House	November 7, 1972 (#72001027)	8353 Mentor Ave. 41°39′58″N 81°20′31″W	Mentor	
11	Harry Coulby Mansion	Harry Coulby Mansion	August 24, 1979 (#79001875)	28730 Ridge Rd. 41°35′43″N 81°28′41″W	Wickliffe	Named for Harry Coulby
12	George Damon House	George Damon House	October 20, 1980 (#80003113)	841 W. Main St. 41°46′08″N 81°03′54″W	Madison	
13	James Dayton House	James Dayton House	October 20, 1980 (#80003114)	939 W. Main St. 41°46′08″N 81°03′15″W	Madison	
14	James Dayton House II	James Dayton House II	October 20, 1980 (#80003115)	417 W. Main St. 41°46′12″N 81°03′24″W	Madison	
15	Albert DeHeck House	Albert DeHeck House	October 20, 1980 (#80003116)	431 W. Main St. 41°46′12″N 81°03′26″W	Madison	
16	Downtown Painesville Historic District	Downtown Painesville Historic District	June 29, 2020 (#100005323)	Veterans Park, 22 Liberty St., 7 Richmond St., 7-71 North Park Pl., 30-100 South Park Pl., 15-34 South Saint Clair St., 105-270 Main St., excluding 177 Main St., 8-124 North State St., 1-83 South State St., excluding 54 South State St., 41°43′30″N 81°14′37″W	Painesville	
17	Downtown Willoughby Historic District	Downtown Willoughby Historic District	November 29, 1995 (#95001362)	Approximately nine blocks centered around the junction of Erie and River Sts. and Euclid Ave. 41°38′21″N 81°24′25″W	Willoughby	
18	Fairport Harbor West Breakwater Light	Fairport Harbor West Breakwater Light	April 10, 1992 (#92000242)	Western breakwater pierhead at harbor entrance, northeast of Fairport Harbor; 41°46′02″N 81°16′53″W	Painesville Township	
19	Fairport Marine Museum	Fairport Marine Museum	November 5, 1971 (#71000642)	129 2nd St. 41°45′25″N 81°16′39″W	Fairport Harbor	
20	Claud Foster House	Claud Foster House	June 16, 2004 (#04000611)	30333 Lakeshore Boulevard; 41°38′21″N 81°28′37″W	Willowick	
21	Frances Ensign Fuller House	Frances Ensign Fuller House	October 20, 1980 (#80003117)	790 W. Main St. 41°46′11″N 81°03′57″W	Madison	
22	Garfield Library	Garfield Library	February 23, 1979 (#79001872)	7300 Center St. 41°40′19″N 81°20′25″W	Mentor	
23	Jane Gilbert House	Jane Gilbert House	October 20, 1980 (#80003118)	189-195 W. Main St. 41°46′15″N 81°03′06″W	Madison	
24	H. Gill House	H. Gill House	October 20, 1980 (#80003119)	232 River St. 41°46′01″N 81°02′58″W	Madison	
25	Norma Grantham Site (33-La-139)	Norma Grantham Site (33-La-139)	May 31, 1984 (#84003757)	600 meters (2,000 ft) south of the Fairport Harbor Village Site, along East Street about 0.75 miles (1.21 km) south of Lake Erie; 41°44′27″N 81°16′08″W	Fairport Harbor	
26	Gray-Coulton House	Gray-Coulton House	December 3, 1975 (#75001452)	8607-8617 Mentor Ave. 41°40′11″N 81°19′56″W	Mentor	
27	Lucius Green House	Lucius Green House	July 12, 1976 (#76001462)	4160 Main St. 41°45′31″N 81°08′21″W	Perry	
28	Leonard C. Hanna, Jr., Estate	Leonard C. Hanna, Jr., Estate	March 12, 1979 (#79001870)	Little Mountain Rd. 41°38′25″N 81°19′02″W	Kirtland Hills	
29	Francis Hendry House	Francis Hendry House	October 20, 1980 (#80003120)	239-243 W. Main St. 41°46′15″N 81°03′10″W	Madison	
30	Indian Point Fort	Indian Point Fort	July 30, 1974 (#74001543)	East of Painesville; 41°43′13″N 81°10′17″W	LeRoy Township	
31	Cyrus J. Ingersoll House	Cyrus J. Ingersoll House	October 20, 1980 (#80003121)	249 W. Main St. 41°46′14″N 81°03′11″W	Madison	
32	John J. Jones House	John J. Jones House	October 20, 1980 (#80003122)	298 Lake St. 41°46′37″N 81°02′50″W	Madison	
33	John Kellogg House and Barn	John Kellogg House and Barn	October 20, 1980 (#80003123)	30 E. Main St. 41°46′14″N 81°02′46″W	Madison	
34	Addison Kimball House	Addison Kimball House	March 27, 1975 (#75001449)	390 W. Main St. 41°46′15″N 81°03′23″W	Madison	
35	Lemuel Kimball, II, House	Lemuel Kimball, II, House	October 15, 1974 (#74001540)	467 W. Main St. 41°46′12″N 81°03′29″W	Madison	
36	Solomon Kimball House	Solomon Kimball House	October 20, 1980 (#80003124)	391 W. Main St. 41°46′13″N 81°03′23″W	Madison	
37	Kirtland Temple	Kirtland Temple	June 4, 1969 (#69000145)	9020 Chillicothe Rd. 41°37′31″N 81°21′44″W	Kirtland	
38	Ladd's Tavern	Ladd's Tavern	May 22, 1978 (#78002091)	5466 S. Ridge Rd. 41°45′46″N 81°05′36″W	Madison Township	
39	Lake Shore and Michigan Southern RR Depot and Freight House	Lake Shore and Michigan Southern RR Depot and Freight House	January 31, 1978 (#78002092)	8445 Station St. 41°40′44″N 81°20′18″W	Mentor	
40	Lawnfield-James A. Garfield Estate	Lawnfield-James A. Garfield Estate	October 15, 1966 (#66000613)	8095 Mentor Ave. 41°39′44″N 81°20′50″W	Mentor	Also designated a National Historic Landmark
41	Lutz's Tavern	Lutz's Tavern	April 23, 1973 (#73001487)	792 Mentor Ave. 41°42′47″N 81°15′37″W	Painesville	Houses a restaurant as of 2026
42	William Lyman House	William Lyman House	October 20, 1980 (#80003125)	734 W. Main St. 41°46′11″N 81°03′50″W	Madison	
43	Madison Fort	Madison Fort	July 30, 1974 (#74001541)	On a ridge between the Grand River and Mill Creek, southeast of Madison; 41°44′42″N 81°01′20″W	Madison Township	
44	Madison Seminary and Home	Madison Seminary and Home	February 22, 1979 (#79001871)	North of central Madison at 6769 Middle Ridge Rd. 41°47′25″N 81°02′45″W	Madison	
45	James Mason House	James Mason House	September 18, 1975 (#75001453)	8125 Mentor Ave. 41°39′52″N 81°20′57″W	Mentor	
46	Mathews House	Mathews House	April 23, 1973 (#73001488)	309 W. Washington St. 41°43′09″N 81°14′59″W	Painesville	
47	Mentor Avenue District	Mentor Avenue District	August 3, 1978 (#78002093)	Wood St. and Mentor Ave. from Liberty to Washington St. 41°43′17″N 81°14′56″W	Painesville	
48	Mentor Village Hall	Mentor Village Hall	September 10, 2014 (#14000591)	8383 Mentor Ave. 41°40′00″N 81°20′26″W	Mentor	Renovated 2015–2017
49	Mentor Village School	Mentor Village School	February 9, 2005 (#05000026)	7482 Center St. 41°40′01″N 81°20′26″W	Mentor	
50	Rev. Harlan Metcalf House	Rev. Harlan Metcalf House	October 20, 1980 (#80003126)	275 W. Main St. 41°46′14″N 81°03′14″W	Madison	
51	Methodist Episcopal Church of Painesville	Methodist Episcopal Church of Painesville	January 30, 1998 (#98000043)	71 N. Park Place; 41°43′31″N 81°14′40″W	Painesville	
52	Edward W. and Louise C. Moore Estate	Edward W. and Louise C. Moore Estate	March 10, 1988 (#88000209)	7960 Garfield Rd. 41°38′19″N 81°21′24″W	Kirtland	
53	Lewis Morley House	Lewis Morley House	March 30, 1978 (#78002094)	231 N. State St. 41°43′47″N 81°14′40″W	Painesville	
54	Norfolk and Western Freight Station	Norfolk and Western Freight Station	October 20, 1980 (#80003127)	Lake St. 41°46′29″N 81°02′48″W	Madison	
55	Old South Church	Old South Church	September 20, 1973 (#73001485)	9802 Chillicothe Rd. 41°36′16″N 81°21′01″W	Kirtland	
56	John G. Oliver House	John G. Oliver House	October 1, 1981 (#81000444)	7645 Little Mountain Rd. 41°39′40″N 81°19′30″W	Mentor	
57	David R. Paige House	David R. Paige House	December 23, 1975 (#75001450)	21-29 W. Main St. 41°46′16″N 81°02′53″W	Madison	Destroyed by fire in 2022.
58	Painesville City Hall	Painesville City Hall	July 24, 1972 (#72001028)	7 Richmond St. 41°43′27″N 81°14′45″W	Painesville	
59	George Pease House	George Pease House	October 20, 1980 (#80003128)	553 W. Main St. 41°46′11″N 81°03′34″W	Madison	
60	Louis A. Penfield House	Louis A. Penfield House	February 7, 1997 (#96001622)	2203 River Rd. 41°37′09″N 81°24′31″W	Willoughby Hills	
61	St. James Episcopal Church	St. James Episcopal Church	July 7, 1975 (#75001455)	141 N. State St. 41°43′41″N 81°14′36″W	Painesville	
62	Sawyer-Wayside House	Sawyer-Wayside House	October 29, 1974 (#74001542)	9470 Mentor Ave. 41°40′50″N 81°18′01″W	Mentor	Demolished April 2021
63	Uri Seeley House	Uri Seeley House	August 14, 1973 (#73001489)	969 Riverside Dr. 41°42′54″N 81°12′30″W	Painesville Township	
64	Orland Selby House	Orland Selby House	October 20, 1980 (#80003129)	564 E. Main St. 41°46′27″N 81°02′05″W	Madison	
65	Sessions House	Sessions House	August 14, 1973 (#73001490)	157 Mentor Ave. 41°42′45″N 81°14′55″W	Painesville	
66	Smart Building	Smart Building	September 29, 1983 (#83001989)	4143-4145 Erie St. 41°38′22″N 81°24′24″W	Willoughby	
67	Smead House	Smead House	November 21, 1974 (#74001544)	187 Mentor Ave. 41°43′15″N 81°15′01″W	Painesville	
68	David Smead House	David Smead House	October 20, 1980 (#80003130)	269 E. Main St. 41°46′24″N 81°02′28″W	Madison	
69	South Leroy Meetinghouse	South Leroy Meetinghouse	May 8, 1979 (#79001873)	Southeast of Painesville at State Route 86 and Brakeman Rd. 41°39′51″N 81°08′48″W	LeRoy Township	
70	Mr. and Mrs. Karl A. Staley House	Mr. and Mrs. Karl A. Staley House	March 4, 2014 (#14000042)	6363 Lake Rd., W., north of Madison; 41°49′53″N 81°03′40″W	Madison Township	
71	Joseph Talcott House	Joseph Talcott House	October 20, 1980 (#80003131)	354 River St. 41°45′55″N 81°02′55″W	Madison	
72	Judge Abraham Tappan House	Judge Abraham Tappan House	May 8, 1979 (#79001874)	7855 S. Ridge Rd. in Unionville; 41°46′48″N 81°00′15″W	Madison Township	
73	Town Center District	Town Center District	October 20, 1980 (#80004247)	Main St. between River and Lake Sts. 41°46′16″N 81°02′56″W	Madison	
74	Unionville District School	Unionville District School	December 29, 1978 (#78002095)	3480 West St. in Unionville; 41°46′45″N 81°00′24″W	Madison Township	
75	Unionville Tavern	Unionville Tavern	July 26, 1973 (#73001492)	On State Route 84 in Unionville; 41°46′49″N 81°00′11″W	Madison Township	
76	Edwin L. Ware House	Edwin L. Ware House	October 20, 1980 (#80003132)	293 W. Main St. 41°46′14″N 81°03′15″W	Madison	
77	Newel K. Whitney Store	Newel K. Whitney Store	August 30, 1984 (#84003759)	8881 Chillicothe Rd. 41°37′46″N 81°21′42″W	Kirtland	
78	George D. Wilson House	George D. Wilson House	October 20, 1980 (#80003133)	367 River St. 41°45′54″N 81°02′53″W	Madison	
79	Dr. J. C. Winans House	Dr. J. C. Winans House	April 26, 1976 (#76001461)	143 River St. 41°46′07″N 81°02′58″W	Madison	
80	John and Carrie Yager House	John and Carrie Yager House	March 17, 1994 (#94000240)	7612 S. Center St. 41°39′51″N 81°20′25″W	Mentor	
81	Benjamin and Mary Young House	Benjamin and Mary Young House	August 8, 1996 (#96000867)	7597 S. Center St. 41°39′52″N 81°20′24″W	Mentor	

== Former listings ==
	Name on the Register	Image	Date listed	Date removed	Location	City or town	Description
1	Octagon House		July 25, 1974 (#09000103)	November 10, 1975	1615 Mentor Avenue	Painesville	

== See also ==
- List of National Historic Landmarks in Ohio
- Listings in neighboring counties: Ashtabula, Cuyahoga, Geauga
- Historic country estates in Lake County, Ohio
- National Register of Historic Places listings in Ohio
