= Kimball House =

Kimball House may refer to:

in the United States (by state then town)

- Kimball House (Dardanelle, Arkansas), listed on the National Register of Historic Places (NRHP) in Yell County
- Kimball House (Atlanta), Georgia, historic hotels
- William W. Kimball House, Chicago, Illinois, listed on the NRHP in Cook County
- Kimball–Stevenson House, Davenport, Iowa, listed on the NRHP in Scott County
- W.W. Kimball House, Arlington, Massachusetts, listed on the NRHP in Middlesex County
- Farley-Hutchinson-Kimball House, Bedford, Massachusetts, listed on the NRHP in Middlesex County
- C. Henry Kimball House, Chelsea, Massachusetts, listed on the NRHP in Suffolk County
- Hazen-Kimball-Aldrich House, Georgetown, Massachusetts, listed on the NRHP in Essex County
- Solomon Kimball House (Wenham, Massachusetts), listed on the NRHP in Essex County
- Mary Rogers Kimball House, Omaha, Nebraska, listed on the NRHP in Douglas County
- Kimball Castle, Gilford, New Hampshire, listed on the NRHP in Belknap County
- Lemuel Kimball, II, House, listed on the NRHP in Lake County
- Solomon Kimball House (Madison, Ohio), listed on the NRHP in Lake County
- Addison Kimball House, Madison, Ohio, listed on the NRHP in Lake County
- Kimball House (Mechanicsburg, Ohio), listed on the NRHP in Champaign County
- Burt Kimball House, Park City, Utah, listed on the NRHP in Summit County
- Ernest Lynn Kimball House, Park City, Utah, listed on the NRHP in Summit County
- Alanson M. Kimball House, Pine River, Wisconsin, listed on the NRHP in Waushara County

== See also ==
- Solomon Kimball House (disambiguation)
