= Kyle Beyer =

Current position
- Title: Interim head coach
- Team: UTEP
- Conference: Mountain West
- Record: 0–0

Biographical details
- Education: Grove City College

Playing career
- 2014–2017: Grove City
- Position: Free safety

Coaching career (HC unless noted)
- 2018: Indiana Wesleyan (DB)
- 2019–2021: Indiana Wesleyan (ST/LB)
- 2022: Indiana Wesleyan (DC)
- 2023: Roosevelt (DC)
- 2024–2025: UTEP (Defensive analyst)
- 2026: UTEP (Interim HC/DC/LB)

Head coaching record
- Overall: 0–0

Kyle Beyer is an American football coach. He is the interim head coach and defensive coordinator at UTEP. He first joined the UTEP staff in 2024. He was previously an assistant coach at Roosevelt University and Indiana Wesleyan University.

== Early life ==
Beyer grew up in Perry, Ohio, east of Cleveland, Ohio, and attended Perry High School. He started all four years (2014–2017) at Grove City College, playing free safety, and graduated in 2018 with a degree in elementary education.

== Coaching career ==
Beyer began his coaching career in 2018 at Indiana Wesleyan in Marion, Indiana, where he was hired to coach defensive backs on the staff of head coach Jordan Langs. 2018 was the inaugural season for the Indiana Wesleyan football team, which competed as a member of the NAIA Mid-States Football Association. Beyer remained on the staff through the end of the 2022 season. He coached special teams and linebackers from 2019 to 2021, and was defensive coordinator in 2022, succeeding J. J. Clark.

Following the 2022 season, in which Indiana Wesleyan reached the NAIA semifinals, Langs departed to become special teams coordinator and running backs coach at Division I FBS Iowa State. Beyer departed as well, to become defensive coordinator at Roosevelt University in Chicago. Roosevelt had resumed its athletics programs in 2010. It added football in 2020 after merging with Robert Morris University Illinois, which already had a program. As Beyer arrived to join Jared Williamson's staff in 2023 Roosevelt was reclassifying from the NAIA to NCAA Division II, a process that it completed in 2026.

Following the 2023 season, incoming University of Texas at El Paso head coach Scotty Walden hired Beyer as a defensive analyst. UTEP competed in Division I FBS as a member of Conference USA. Walden promoted Beyer to defensive coordinator for the 2026 season, after Bobby Daly returned to Montana State. UTEP fired Walden on November 16, 2026, and named Beyer interim coach for the final two games of the season.

== Head coaching record ==
Year	Team	Overall	Conference	Standing	Bowl/playoffs	Coaches^{#}	STATS^{°}
UTEP Miners (Mountain West Conference) (2026–present)
2026	UTEP	0–0 (Note: Beyer replaced Walden with two games remaining)	0–0				
UTEP:		0–0	0–0				
Total:		0–0					
National championship Conference title Conference division title or championship game berth
