= Addison Kimball =

American architect

Addison Kimball was a "noted local architect and builder" in Madison, Ohio in the 19th century.

A number of his works are listed on the U.S. National Register of Historic Places.

Works include (attribution):

- George Damon House (built 1840), 841 W. Main St. Madison, OH (Kimball, Addison), NRHP-listed
- James Dayton House, 939 W. Main St. Madison, OH (Kimball, Addison), NRHP-listed
- Addison Kimball House, 390 W. Main St. Madison, OH (Kimball, Addison), NRHP-listed
- Ladd's Tavern, 5466 S. Ridge Rd. Madison, OH (Kimball, Addison), NRHP-listed
- David R. Paige House, 21-29 W. Main St. Madison, OH (Kimball, Addison), NRHP-listed
- George Pease House, 553 W. Main St. Madison, OH (Kimball, Addison), NRHP-listed
- Orland Selby House, 564 E. Main St. Madison, OH (Kimball, Addison), NRHP-listed
