= Anthony Kukwa =

American football player (born 1992)

Profile
- Position: Long snapper

Personal information
- Born: October 30, 1992 (age 34); Perry, Ohio, U.S.
- Listed height: 6 ft 3 in (1.91 m)
- Listed weight: 221 lb (100 kg)

Career information
- High school: Perry High School
- College: Lake Erie
- NFL draft: 2017: undrafted

Career history
- Oakland Raiders (2017)*; Los Angeles Chargers (2018)*; Houston Texans (2020–2021)*
- * Offseason or practice squad member only

Awards and highlights
- College Gridiron Showcase Offensive MVP (2017)
- K/KukwAn00.htm Stats at Pro Football Reference

Anthony Kukwa (born October 30, 1992) is an American former football long snapper. He initially attended Ball State University and later transferred to Lake Erie College, where he played long snapper and tight end. Kukwa is Lake Erie's first ever student-athlete to sign an NFL contract.

== Professional career ==
=== Oakland Raiders ===
Kukwa signed with the Oakland Raiders as an undrafted free agent on May 5, 2017. He was waived by the Raiders on July 7, 2017.

=== Los Angeles Chargers ===
On January 4, 2018, Kukwa signed a reserve/future contract with the Los Angeles Chargers. On May 30, 2018, he was waived by the Chargers.

=== Houston Texans ===
Kukwa had a mini-camp tryout with the Houston Texans in 2019, but was not signed to a contract. He signed with the team on April 25, 2020. He was waived on July 27, 2020. Kukwa had a tryout with the Texans on August 20, 2020, and re-signed with the team three days later. He was waived on September 5, 2020. On December 15, 2020, Kukwa made his first official NFL regular season roster, by being signed to the 2020 Houston Texans Practice Squad. He signed a reserve/future contract on January 4, 2021. He was waived on March 23, 2021.
