= Perry Local School District =

Perry Local School District is the name of two school districts in Ohio:

- Perry Local School District (Stark County) in Stark County, sometimes referred to as "Massillon Perry"
- Perry Local School District (Lake County) in Lake County
