= Cecil V. Thomas =

- Born: September 17, 1892; Perry, Ohio, U.S.A
- Died: November 28, 1947 (aged 55); Cleveland, Ohio, U.S.A
- Occupation: First President of Fenn College
- Spouse: Sylvia Mae Thomas

Dr. Cecil Vincent "Tommy" Thomas September 17, 1892, Perry, Ohio – November 28, 1947, Cleveland, Ohio), was a distinguished American educator, administrator, and the first president of Fenn College.

== Fenn College ==
It is unclear when he first was officially given the title of President of Fenn College. The first reference to it is in a letter Thomas wrote on May 1, 1934.

== Personal life ==
He was married to Sylvia Mae Thomas (née Moore). He died in his office at Fenn College on November 28, 1947.
