= Lake County Executive Airport =

- IATA: LNN; ICAO: KLNN; FAA LID: LNN

Summary
- Airport type: Public
- Owner/Operator: Lake County, Ohio
- Serves: Willoughby, Ohio
- Time zone: UTC−05:00 (-5)
  - Summer (DST): UTC−04:00 (-4)
- Elevation AMSL: 626 ft (191 m)
- Coordinates: 41°41′02″N 081°23′23″W
- Website: lcport.org/lake-county-executive-airport

Map
- Location of airport in Ohio LNN (the United States)

Runways
Direction	Length		Surface
Direction	ft	m	Surface
05/23	5,028	1,533	Asphalt
10/28	4,272	1,302	Asphalt

Statistics (2020)
- Aircraft operations: 45,085
- Based aircraft: 90
- Source: Federal Aviation Administration

Lake County Executive Airport (IATA: LNN, ICAO: KLNN, FAA LID: LNN), formerly Lost Nation Airport, is a public use airport in Lake County, Ohio, United States. Located approximately 3 miles (5 km) north-northeast of the central business district of the City of Willoughby, it was owned and operated by that city until October 8, 2014, when it was transferred to Lake County and the Lake County Port and Economic Development Authority. The airport's name was changed from Lost Nation Airport to Lake County Executive Airport, alternately "Lake County Executive Airport at Lost Nation Field," in March 2020.

This airport was included in the National Plan of Integrated Airport Systems for 2011–2015, which categorized it as a general aviation reliever airport for Cleveland Hopkins International Airport.

== History ==
The area that became the airport was first used as a flying field in 1929 by the Osborn family. By 1933 it was known as Lost Nation Airport. The Lake Erie Flying Club, a women's flying club from Lake Erie College founded in 1935, was based at the airport. It was purchased by Kent Smith and rededicated on 25 August 1940. The airport was taken over by the Civil Air Patrol in July 1943 and operated by the organization until 1946, when it was acquired by William F. McNeely. A second runway, 05/23, was built in 1956. The extension of the runway in 1963 caused consternation among some nearby residents. They stated that it brought airplanes too close to their houses and objected to approach lighting. They argued that the airport should either close the runway or purchase and demolish their houses. A 1969 plan by the Cleveland Electric Illuminating Company to build a 600 ft (180 m) smokestack nearby was opposed by pilots from the airport. By 1973, the airport had expanded to over 500 acres (200 ha). It was donated to Case Western Reserve University in the early 1980s. Around that time, Kucera International, an aerial photography company, began operations at the airport. In October 1980, the City of Willoughby lost a lawsuit against two developers for refusing to rezone land next to the airport. The city subsequently purchased the airport in 1986. The city began modernizing the airport with approximately $14 million in grants. Work included enlarging the runways and removing obstructions, such as nearby houses and the old airport terminal. Construction had begun on a hangar and headquarters for Cleveland Jet Center by late 1991. However, within a year the airport began receiving noise complaints from engine testing. CJC attempted to address the complaints by offering a tour of its 75,000 sq ft (7,000 m^{2}) hangar to local leaders. However, amid concerns that the airport might close, CJC announced it was leaving in 1996. The following July a fly-in of a B-17 and CASA 2.111 was held, during which a plan for an aviation museum at the airport was proposed. (Note: The group behind the effort, the United States Aviation Museum, continued to hold the "Gathering of Eagles Air Show" intermittently at the airport until at least 2014.) In 1998, plans were announced to demolish four dilapidated hangars at the airport. A proposal to turn 13 acres (5.3 ha) of airport property into a soccer complex was announced in 2001. The airport was transferred to the Lake County Ohio Port and Economic Development Authority in 2014 and renamed to Lake County Executive Airport in 2019.

== Facilities and aircraft ==
Lake County Executive Airport covers an area of 400 acres (162 ha) at an elevation of 626 feet (191 m) above mean sea level. It has two runways with asphalt surfaces: 5/23 is 5,028 by 100 feet (1,533 x 30 m) and 10/28 is 4,272 by 100 feet (1,302 x 30 m).

For the 12-month period ending July 21, 2020, the airport had 45,085 aircraft operations, an average of 123 per day: 97% general aviation, 3% air taxi, and <1% military. At that time there were 90 aircraft based at this airport, up from 73 in 2011: 67 single-engine and 12 multi-engine airplanes, 9 jets, and 2 helicopters.

The airport has a fixed-base operator that sells fuel, both avgas and Jet A, and offers amenities such as general maintenance, avionics services, catering, courtesy transportation, a conference room, a crew lounge, showers, and more.

In 2022, the aircraft got funding to remove a power pole obstruction in the runway protection zone as well as to redesign its main runway and taxiway.

== Accidents and incidents ==
- On July 21, 1935, a 22-year old woman was killed when she jumped from an airplane as part of a publicity stunt and her parachute failed to open after being deployed.
- On September 5, 1937, a pilot and student were killed when their airplane crashed on the adjacent golf course. (Note: The pilot, Fred Montague, had previously escaped a crash in 1933 that killed another pilot.)
- On November 27, 2002, a Cessna TR182 was substantially damaged when it landed with the landing gear partially extended at the Lake County Executive Airport. Soon after departure, Air Traffic Control stopped receiving a signal from the aircraft's transponder, and the plane requested a return to the airport. The cockpit lights then started to flash, and the pilot reported an electrical problem to ATC. At some point, the radios began to malfunction, and the airplane lost all electrical power. While maneuvering to land, the pilot selected the landing gear to the down position, and the flaps to 10 degrees. The pilot thought the gear had locked, but with no electrical power to illuminate the safe gear indicators, he was not sure. Prior to touchdown, he selected full flaps. The airplane touched down with the landing gear partially extended, started to slide, and overran the runway before coming to a stop. The probable cause of the incident was found to be the pilot's failure to select the alternator to the "ON" position before initiating the flight.
- On April 21, 2004, a Piper PA-34 Seneca was substantially damaged while landing at the Lake County Executive Airport. The airplane encountered moderate rain and gusty winds as it descended on final approach. The pilot further stated that, as the airplane approached the runway, she did not add enough engine power in an adequate time frame to prevent a hard landing. The airplane bounced and came to rest on the runway. Subsequent inspection of the airplane revealed damage to the wing spar, fuselage, both engines, and both propellers. The probable cause of the accident was found to be the pilot's improper flare, which resulted in a hard landing. A factor in this accident was the gusty wind conditions associated with thunderstorm activity.
- On May 15, 2004, a Cessna 310 was destroyed when it impacted terrain shortly after takeoff from Lake County Executive Airport. The airplane was operated by an aerial surveying company. The pilot intended to fly to Dayton to pick up a passenger, who was to operate surveying equipment installed on the airplane. Radar shows that, during the last minute of the plane's flight, it climbed, began a turn, and slowed by 20 knots before radar contact was lost. Several witnesses reported hearing the sound of a "low, loud" airplane, followed by an explosion. One witness observed the airplane about tree top level as it descended toward the ground. He noticed a bluish- green/red light illuminated on the airplane and stated that he did not observe any smoke or fire coming from the airplane. The probable cause of the accident was found to be the pilot's failure to maintain aircraft control during the initial climb after takeoff.
- On February 21, 2016, a Cessna 172 Skyhawk crashed while simulating an engine failure on takeoff during an instructional flight. The student pilot performed a short field takeoff, and after rotation and the retraction of the flaps at about 200 feet above ground level, the throttle was retarded to idle to simulate an engine failure. The instructor told the student to lower the nose multiple times to maintain airspeed before inputting forward pressure himself. The aircraft's sink rate was high and the instructor moved the airplane to a flare for landing. The instructor applied full throttle just before the plane touched down hard in a tail low attitude, and the nose wheel subsequently struck the runway. The aircraft taxied in without further incident, and damage to the firewall was later discovered. The probable cause of the incident was found to be the student pilot's failure to reduce pitch attitude during a simulated engine failure during takeoff initial climb, resulting in a high descent rate and hard landing. Contributing to the accident was the flight instructor's delayed remedial action.
- On August 24, 2020, a Cessna 152 crashed while operating at the Lake County Executive Airport.

== See also ==
- List of airports in Ohio
