= Rachel Jamison Webster =

American writer (born 1974)

- Born: 1974 (age 51–52) Madison, Ohio
- Occupation: Poet; Teacher

Rachel Jamison Webster (born 1974) is an American writer. She is the author of the book Mary is a River, which was a finalist for the National Poetry Series in 2018.

She published two chapbooks with Dancing Girl Press: The Blue Grotto (2009) and Hazel and the Mirror (2015).

She edited two anthologies of creative writing by Chicago Teens, Alchemy (2001) and Paper Atrium (2205). Webster co-founded the online anthology of international poetry, UniVerse, with her late partner Richard Fammeree.

In 2003 she wrote Benjamin Banneker and Us, having discovered Benjamin Banneker was an ancestor, and got in contact with some of his other decedents.

== Early life ==
Webster was born in Madison, Ohio. She attended DePaul University in Chicago, Illinois and then transferred to Lewis & Clark College in Portland, Oregon, where she graduated magna cum laude with a BA in English literature. Her MFA is from Warren Wilson’s Program for Writers.

== Honors ==
Webster has received awards from the Academy of American Poets, the American Association of University Women, the Howard Foundation, and the Poetry Foundation. From 2017-2018, she participated in the OpEd/Public Voices Fellowship. In 2017, Webster was named a Hewlett Fellow for her establishment of curriculum highlighting diversity and social inequalities. In 2018, Northwestern University recognized her with an Arts and Sciences Alumni Teaching Award for excellence in teaching.

== Works ==
- September, TriQuarterly, 2013;
- The Endless Unbegun, Twelve Winters Press, 2015,
- Mary is a River, Kelsay Books 2018.
- Webster, Rachel Jamison (2023-03-21). Benjamin Banneker and Us. Henry Holt. ISBN 978-1-250-82730-2.
