= Lake Metroparks Farmpark =

Farm museum in Kirtland, Ohio

Coordinates: 41°34′31″N 81°19′39″W

- Location: Lake County, Ohio
- Nearest city: Kirtland, Ohio
- Area: 235 acres (95 ha)
- Opened: 1990

Lake Metroparks Farmpark is a working farm located in Kirtland, Ohio. Opened in 1990, the farm is located on 235 acres (95 hectares) with fields, gardens and standard farm buildings.

The park hopes to help people understand how farm life has developed over time, and reinforces that farming is a current and viable lifestyle. Lake Farmpark strives not only to help people understand the past of agriculture but also to draw attention to the present situation of the industry while envisioning future applications.

The farm features dairy cows and daily milking sessions, wagon rides, a plant science center and a building with historic and modern tractors and farm equipment. The barnyard animals include pigs, sheep, chickens, rabbits, horses, llamas, alpacas and goats. Seasonal and weekend activities include cheese making, sheep-shearing, maple sugaring and harvesting.

It was named one of the top 10 educational sites to learn about farming by USA Today.
