= Karl A. Staley House =

Historic house in Ohio, United States

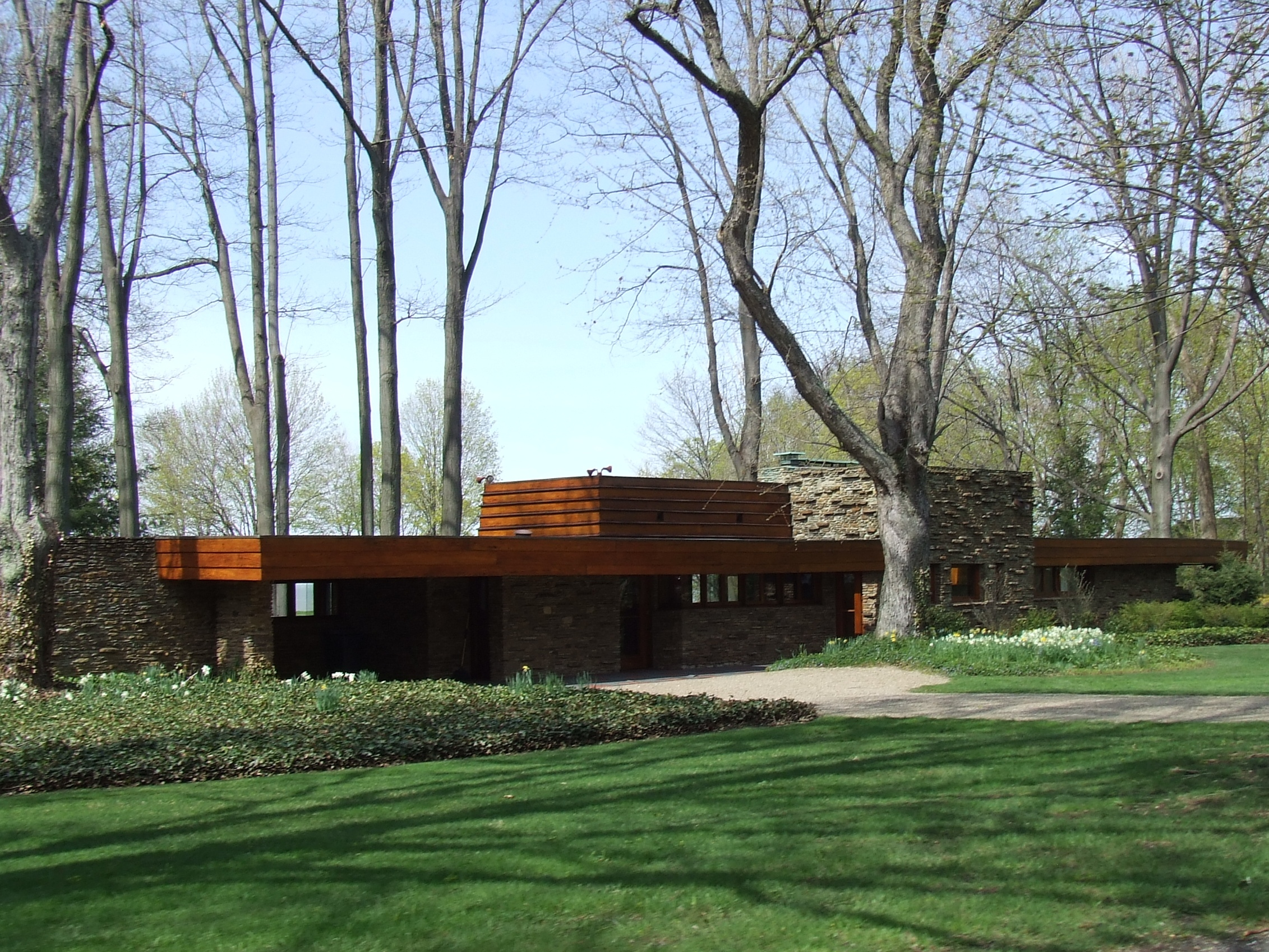

- Location within Ohio
- Interactive map showing the location of Karl A. Staley House

General information
- Type: House
- Architectural style: Usonian
- Location: North Madison, Ohio
- Coordinates: 41.831264°N 81.061155°W
- Construction started: 1951

Design and construction
- Architect: Frank Lloyd Wright

The Karl A. Staley House was designed in 1950 by Frank Lloyd Wright. Situated on the shores of Lake Erie in North Madison, Ohio, this home is constructed with stone, in an I-plan form. The home originally had two bedrooms (a master bedroom, and a guest bedroom), as well as a separate workspace and study. In addition, there was a shop accessible on the other side of the carport (the shop was turned into a guest bedroom when restoration of the space was done in 1980).

The house was added to the National Register of Historic Places in 2014. The Karl A. Staley House is considered significant under Criterion C according to the National Register of Historic Places. The Staley House is one of only a handful of "user-built" Wright buildings in Ohio. An example of one of Wright's Usonian designs, the house was planned in 1950–51, with construction taking place between 1951 and 1954. Noted for its strict adherence to Wright's original design, it is unique among Ohio Wright structures in that it utilizes natural, local river stone collected at Mill Creek in Madison (unlike other Ohio Wright homes in Ohio that use brick). The view of the home from the street is actually the rear facade. The front window-wall faces Lake Erie and offers panoramic views of the water and shoreline.

== See also ==
- List of Frank Lloyd Wright works
- National Register of Historic Places listings in Lake County, Ohio
