= Cornerstone Christian Academy (Ohio) =

Private, coeducational school in Willoughby Hills, Ohio, United States

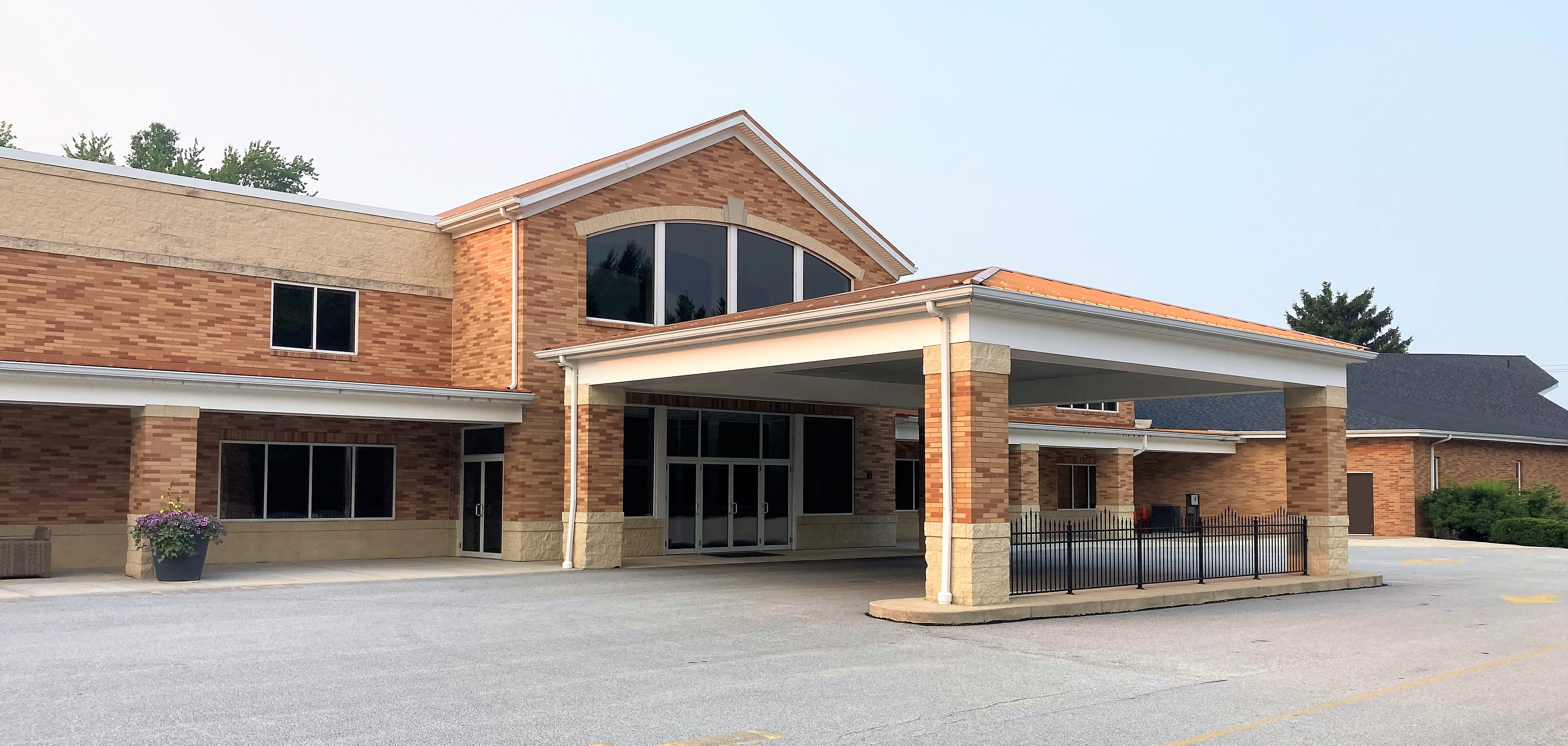

Location
- 2846 SOM Center Road; Willoughby Hills, (Lake County, Ohio), Ohio 44094; United States; 41°34′54″N 81°26′27″W

Information
- Type: Private, Coeducational
- Motto: Students who will impact their world for the glory of God
- Religious affiliation: Christian
- Established: 1999
- Dean: Isaiah Mcqueen
- Principal: Anthony Roberts (HS principal)
- Grades: K-12
- Colors: Red, White and Blue
- Team name: Patriots
- Accreditation: Ohio Department of Education
- School fees: Variable
- Tuition: Variable
- Affiliation: None

Cornerstone Christian Academy (CCA) is a coeducational, non-denominational, private Christian school serving grades K-12, in Willoughby Hills, Ohio.

== Athletics ==
- Soccer - Middle School (coed), Junior High (coed), Varsity teams for both boys and girls
- Volleyball - Junior High, JV, and Varsity (girls)
- Golf - Varsity (boys and girls)
- Basketball - Middle School, Junior High, JV, and Varsity teams for boys and girls
- Cheerleading - Varsity (girls)
- Track and field - Junior High and Varsity (coed)
- Baseball - Junior High and Varsity (boys)
- Fastpitch softball - Varsity (girls)
- Flag football (girls)

The high school boys varsity basketball team won the Division IV State Championship in 2016. The final score was 72–54, against Van Wert Lincolnview.
