= Perry Local School District (Lake County) =

School district in Ohio, United States

Address
- 4325 Manchester Avenue Perry, Ohio, 44081; United States
- Coordinates: 41°46′11″N 81°07′59″W

District information
- Type: Public
- Grades: PK–12
- Schools: 3
- NCES District ID: 3904790

Students and staff
- Students: 1,490 (2024–2025)
- Teachers: 85.70 (on an FTE basis) (2024–2025)
- Staff: 144.26 (on an FTE basis) (2024–2025)
- Student–teacher ratio: 17.39 (2024–2025)

Other information
- Website: perry-lake.org

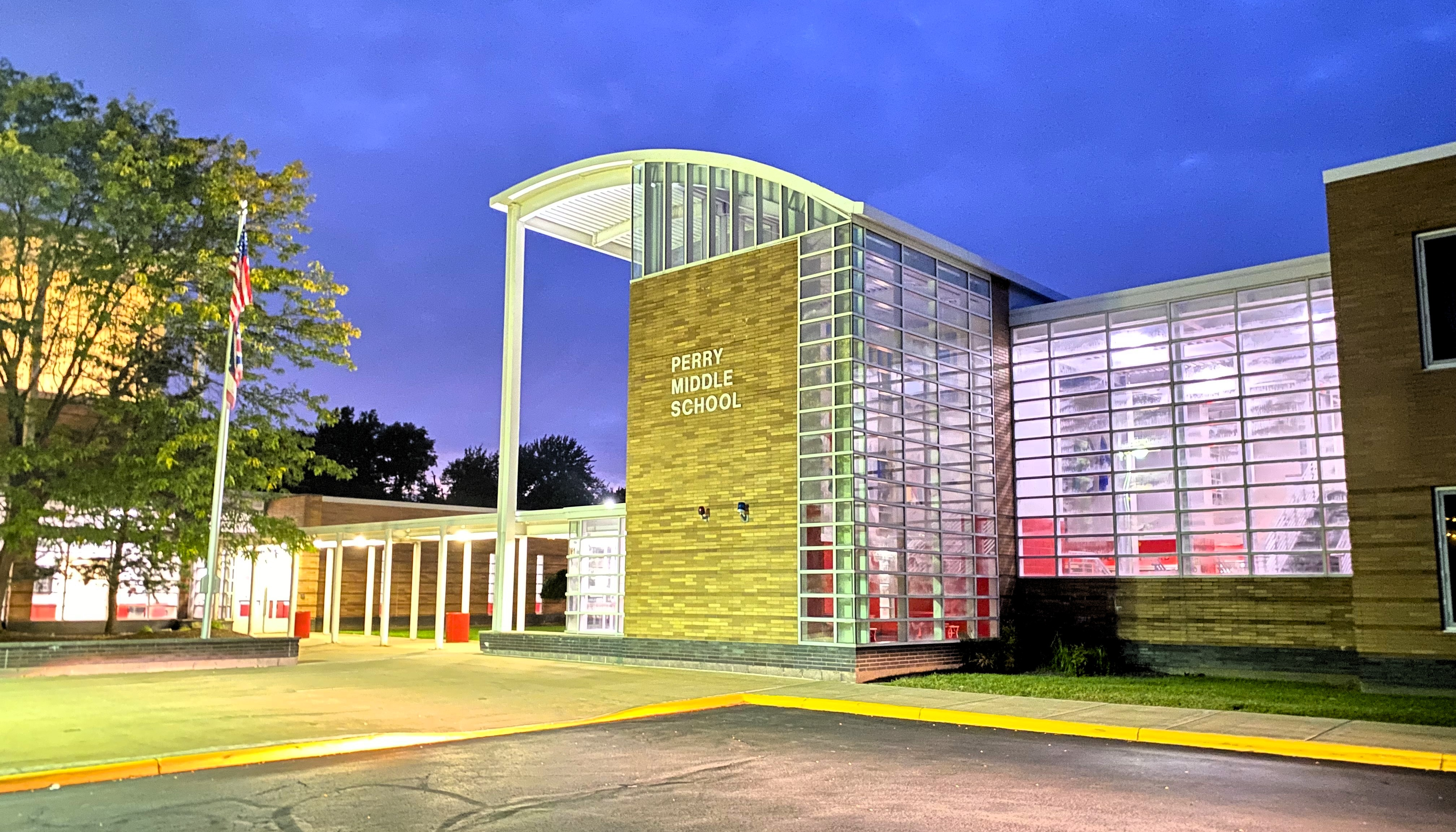
Perry Middle School

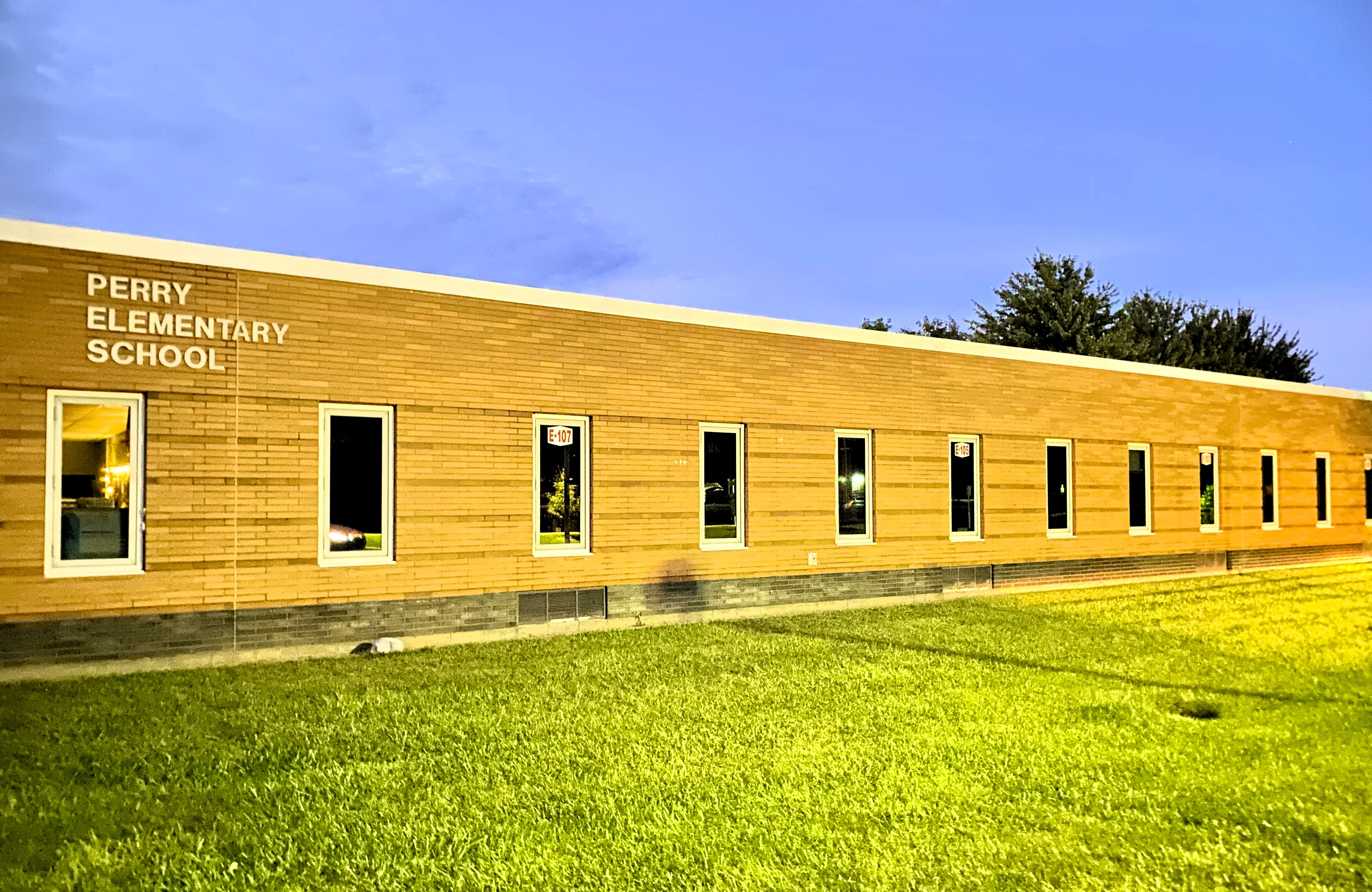
Perry Elementary School

Perry Public Schools is a school system located in Perry, in Lake County, Ohio.

The U.S. Department of Education's No Child Left Behind Blue Ribbon Schools Program named Perry High School as a Blue Ribbon School from 1994 to 1996; Perry Middle School achieved the same status in 1999 and 2000 (one of only about 20 schools statewide in that year.) The three schools (elementary, middle, and high) are all connected on a beautiful, expansive campus with the high school connected to the other two by a long indoor bridge over a small valley. At the high school, connected to the Community Fitness Center (CFC), there is the Alumni Stadium. A track runs around the Fieldturf football field, which is also used as the soccer field. Tennis courts are behind the stadium's video scoreboard. Before the stadium was redone in 2006–2007, it had an Astroturf field and rubberized track.
