= Kimball–Stevenson House =

Historic house in Iowa, United States

- U.S. National Register of Historic Places
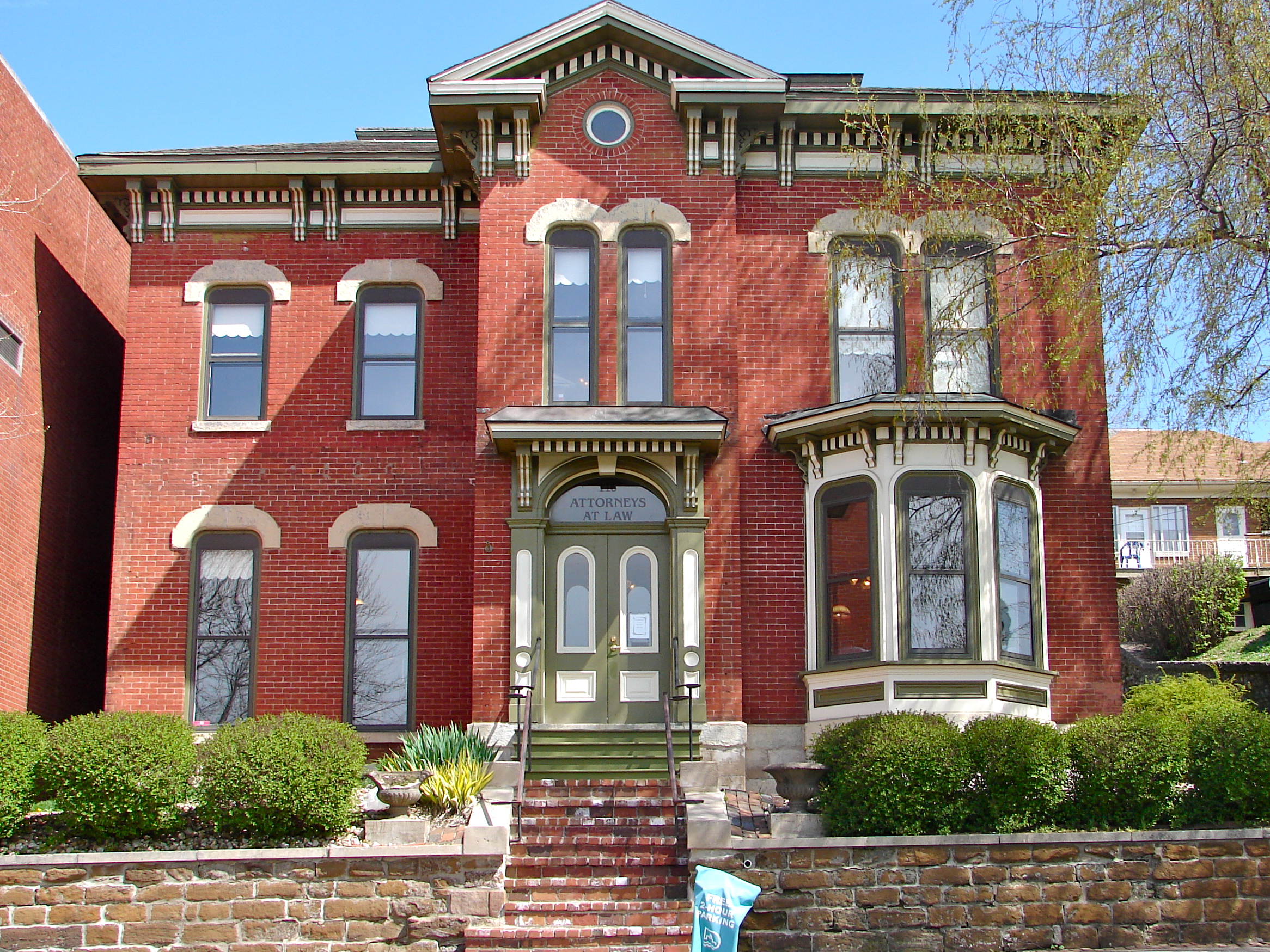

- Location within Iowa Location within the United States
- Location: 116 E. 6th St. Davenport, Iowa
- Coordinates: 41°31′33″N 90°34′23″W
- Area: less than one acre
- Built: 1873
- Architectural style: Italianate
- MPS: Davenport MRA
- NRHP reference No.: 83002458
- Added to NRHP: July 7, 1983

The Kimball–Stevenson House is a historic building located just north of downtown Davenport, Iowa, United States. It was built in 1873 and it has been listed on the National Register of Historic Places since 1983.

== History ==
The building is thought to have been constructed by Davenport builder Thomas McClelland, who owned it briefly in 1873. The house was home to railroad, banking and industry executives. They include Abel Kimball, who was the Superintendent of the Iowa Division of the Chicago, Rock Island and Pacific Railroad and Dr. John Stevenson. From the early 1900s and into the 1940s the house served as a brothel. It was best known as Geraldine's Place. It is thought to be the only known brothel on the National Register of Historic Places. In the years following the house fell into disrepair until it was purchased by attorney Michael Liebbe who restored the building for his law office in the 1990s.

== Architecture ==
The two-story house is built of brick in the Italianate style. The house's layout is somewhat irregular and features gabled projections and a window bay on the front. Bracketed eaves run along the top of the house. The front entrance into the house projects forward and the wall extends beyond the roofline giving the suggestion of a tower.
