= St. James Episcopal Church (Painesville, Ohio) =

Historic church in Ohio, United States

- U.S. National Register of Historic Places
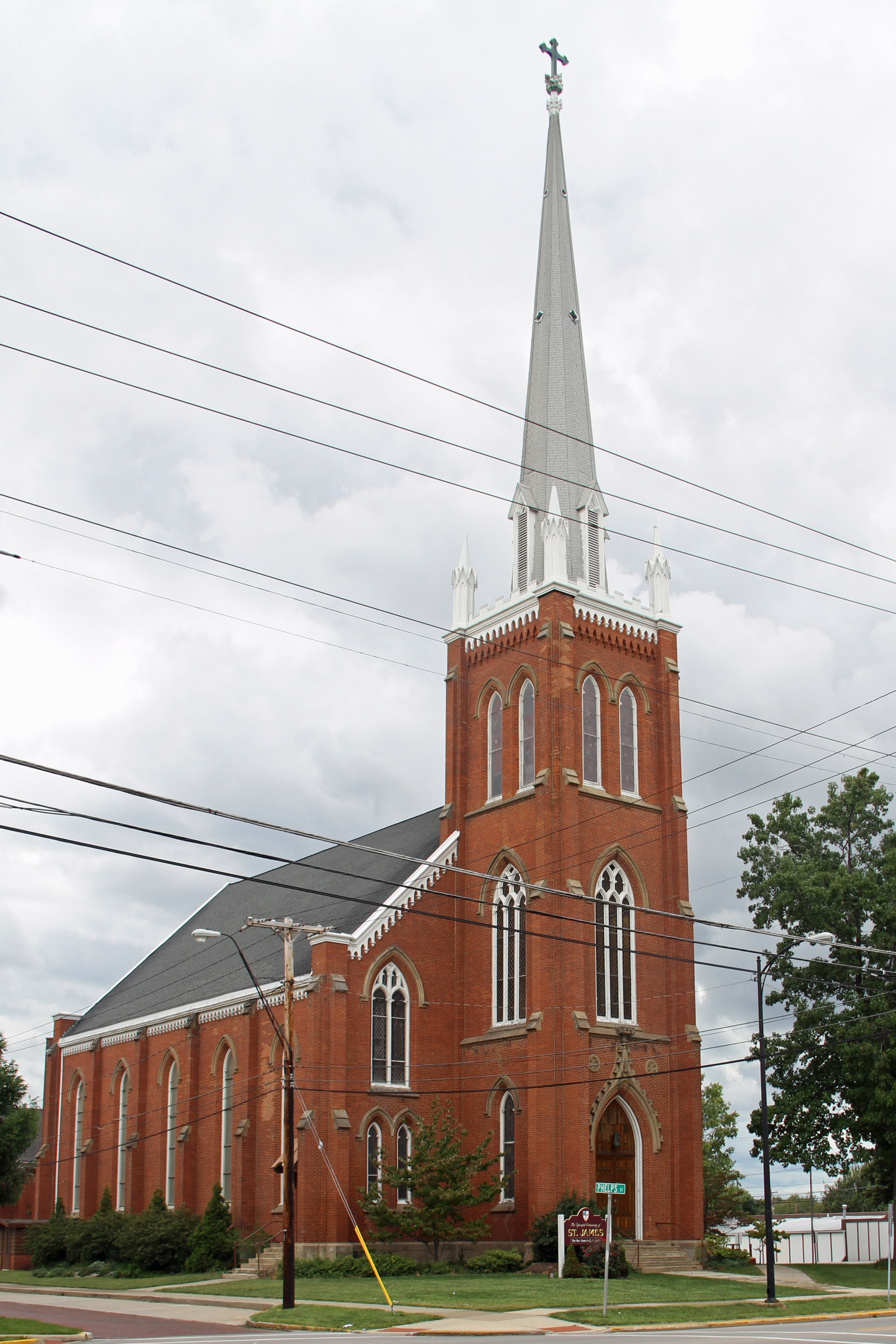

- Location within Ohio Location within the United States
- Location: 131 N. State St., Painesville, Ohio
- Coordinates: 41°43′41″N 81°14′36″W
- Area: less than one acre
- Built: 1865
- Architect: Heard, Charles Wallace
- Architectural style: Gothic Revival
- NRHP reference No.: 75001455
- Added to NRHP: July 7, 1975

St. James Episcopal Church is a historic Episcopal church at 131 North State Street in Painesville, Ohio. It is a congregation of the Episcopal Diocese of Ohio. The main building was built in 1865 in a Gothic Revival style and was added to the National Register of Historic Places in 1975.

In 2017, the church reported 312 members; in 2023, it reported 202 members. No membership statistics were reported in 2024 national parochial reports. Plate and pledge financial support reported by the church in 2023 was $275,397. Average Sunday Attendance (ASA) reported in 2024 was 65 persons. This was a relative decrease on ASA of 142 in 2015.

The Rev. Rachel Jagielski Harrison is the church's rector.

== See also ==
National Register of Historic Places listings in Lake County, Ohio
