= Madison Local School District =

Madison Local School District is the name of multiple public school districts in the U.S. state of Ohio:

- Madison Local School District (Butler County)
- Madison Local School District (Lake County)
- Madison Local School District (Richland County)
