= Burt Kimball House =

- U.S. National Register of Historic Places
- Location within Utah Location within the United States
- Location: 817 Park Ave., Park City, Utah
- Coordinates: 40.647586°N 111.499311°W
- Area: less than one acre
- Built: 1882
- MPS: Mining Boom Era Houses TR
- NRHP reference No.: 84002325
- Added to NRHP: July 12, 1984

The Burt Kimball House, at 817 Park Ave. in Park City, Utah, was built in 1882. It was listed on the National Register of Historic Places in 1984.

It was a one-story hall-parlor plan house.

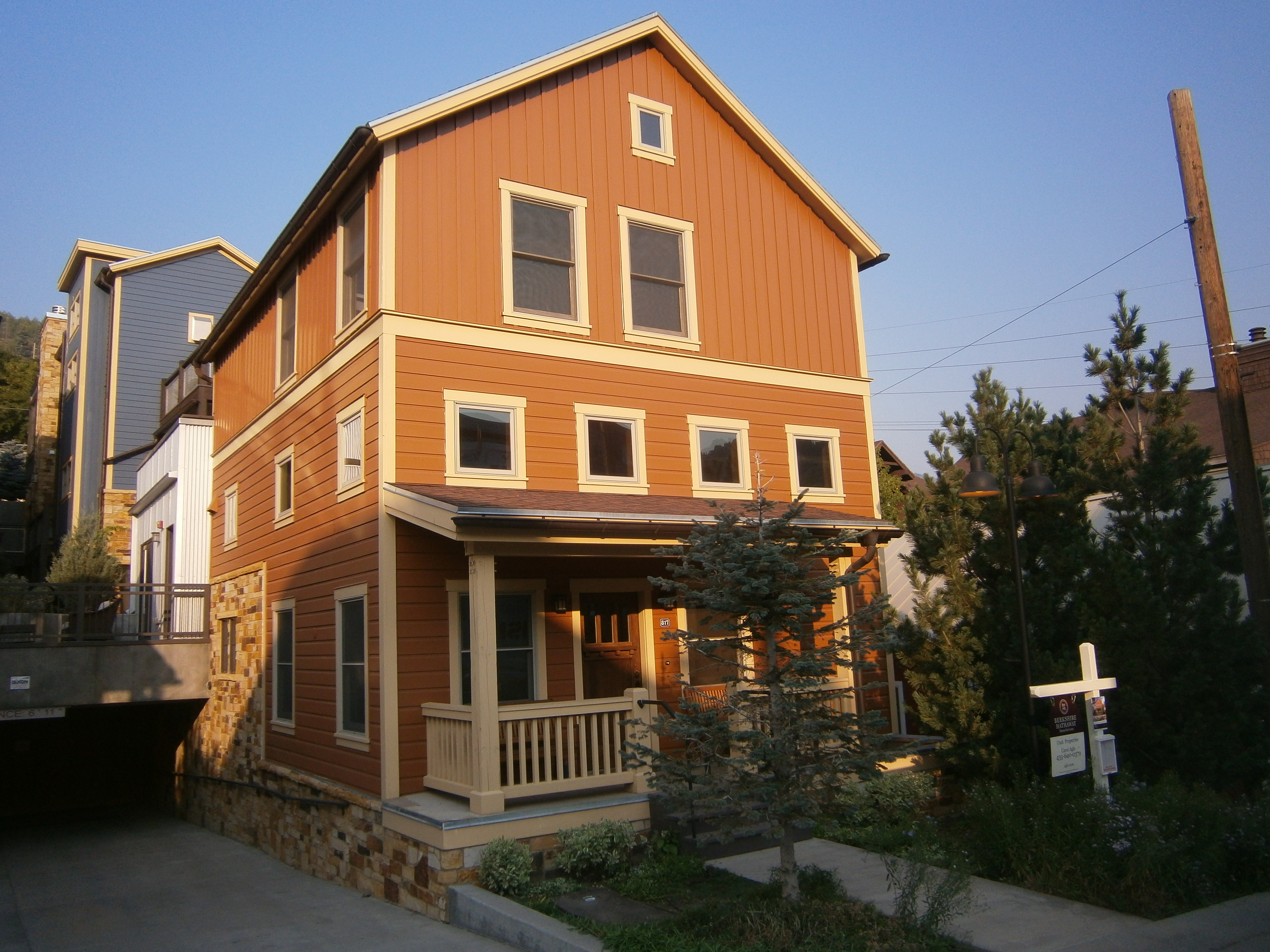
Pic of 817 Park Ave nowadays, seems not to be the historic Burt Kimball House
