= W. W. Kimball House =

Historic house in Massachusetts, United States

- W.W. Kimball House
- U.S. National Register of Historic Places
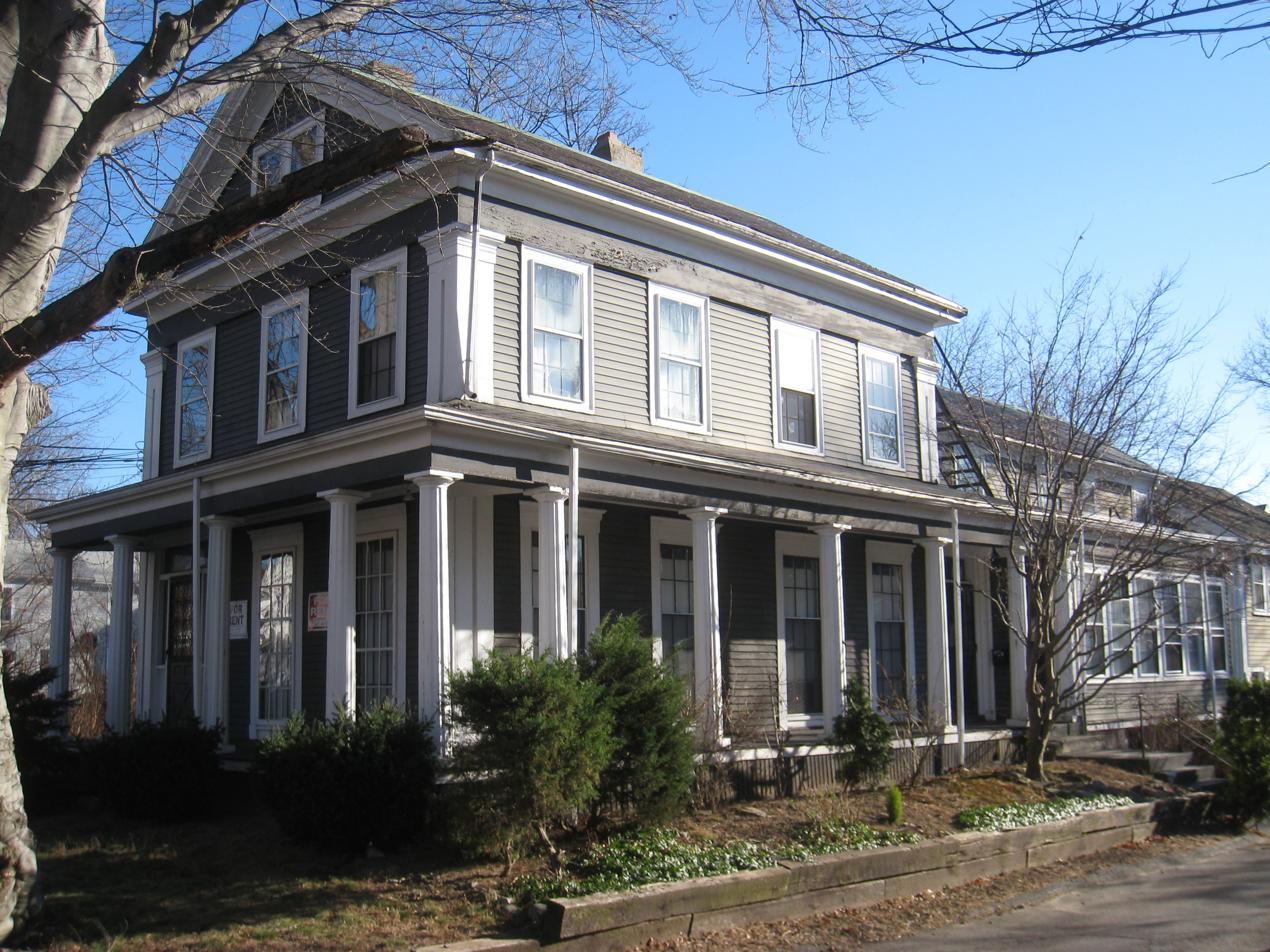

- Location within Massachusetts Location within the United States
- Location: 13 Winter Street, Arlington, Massachusetts
- Coordinates: 42°24′23″N 71°8′30″W
- Built: 1850
- Architectural style: Greek Revival
- MPS: Arlington MRA
- NRHP reference No.: 85001039
- Added to NRHP: April 18, 1985

The W.W. Kimball House is a historic house in Arlington, Massachusetts. The 2.5-story wood-frame house was built sometime between 1847 and 1865, and is one of two houses (the other is the House at 5-7 Winter Street) built by John Squire. Squire probably never lived in the house, but sold it in 1865 to William and Nancy Kimball, who apparently rented it out. The house has well-preserved Greek Revival detailing, including a colonnaded porch that wraps around on two sides. There is a period carriage house on the property.

The house was listed on the National Register of Historic Places in 1985.

== See also ==
- National Register of Historic Places listings in Arlington, Massachusetts
