= Sessions House (Painesville, Ohio) =

Historic house in Ohio, United States

- U.S. National Register of Historic Places
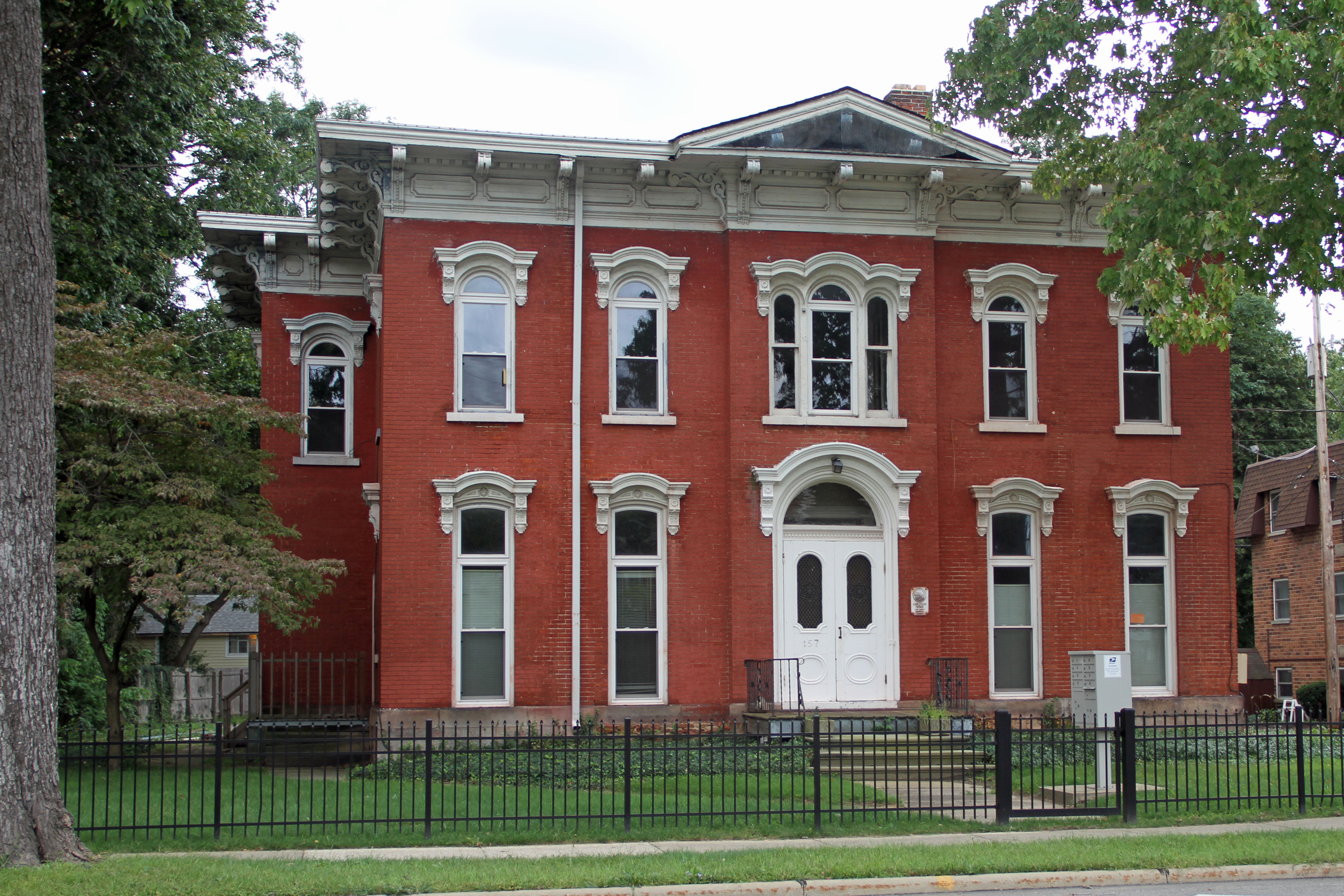

- Location within Ohio Location within the United States
- Location: 157 Mentor Ave., Painesville, Ohio
- Coordinates: 41°42′45″N 81°14′55″W
- Area: less than one acre
- Built: 1870
- Architect: Heard, Charles Wallace
- Architectural style: Italianate
- NRHP reference No.: 73001490
- Added to NRHP: August 14, 1973

Sessions House (also called the "Tuscan House") is a historic Italianate style house at 157 Mentor Avenue in Painesville, Ohio.

Constructed in Italianate style in 1873 for the widow of one of the region's pioneers, the building was added to the National Register of Historic Places in 1973.
