= Addison Kimball House =

Historic house in Ohio, United States

- U.S. National Register of Historic Places
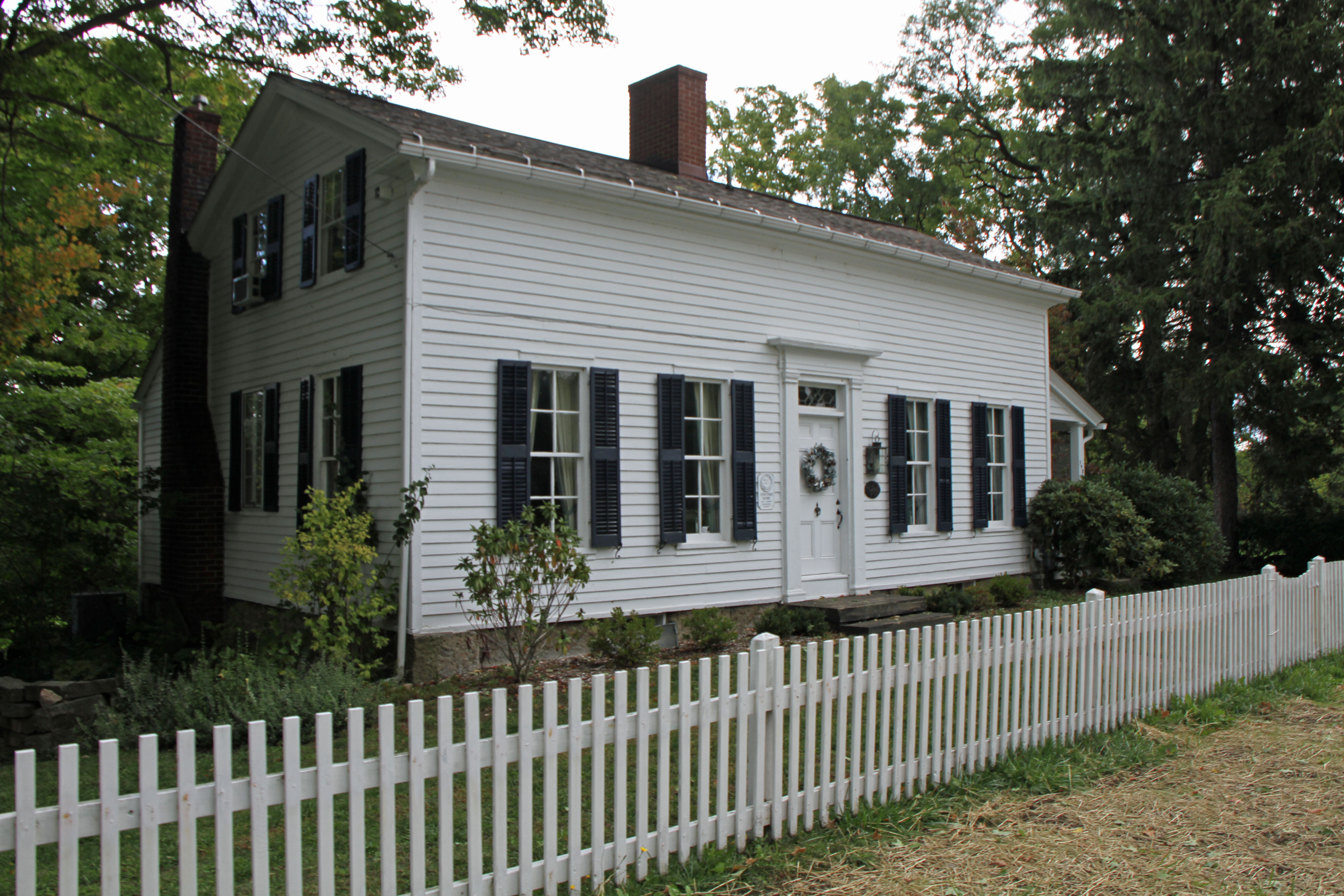

- Location within Ohio Location within the United States
- Location: 390 W. Main St., Madison, Ohio
- Coordinates: 41°46′15″N 81°3′23″W
- Area: less than one acre
- Built: 1815
- Built by: Kimball, Addison
- Architectural style: Federal Vernacular
- MPS: Madison MRA (AD)
- NRHP reference No.: 75001449
- Added to NRHP: March 27, 1975

The Addison Kimball House in Madison, Ohio is a house with corner post construction on a fieldstone foundation that was built in 1815. It appears to be a 1 1/2-story house but is a full two-story house on the inside. It was built by Addison Kimball, son of Lemuel Kimball. Addison was the first homebuilder in Madison; this house is notable as the only house that can definitely be attributed to him.

It was listed on the National Register of Historic Places in 1975.
