= Old South Church (Kirtland, Ohio) =

Historic church in Ohio, United States

- U.S. National Register of Historic Places
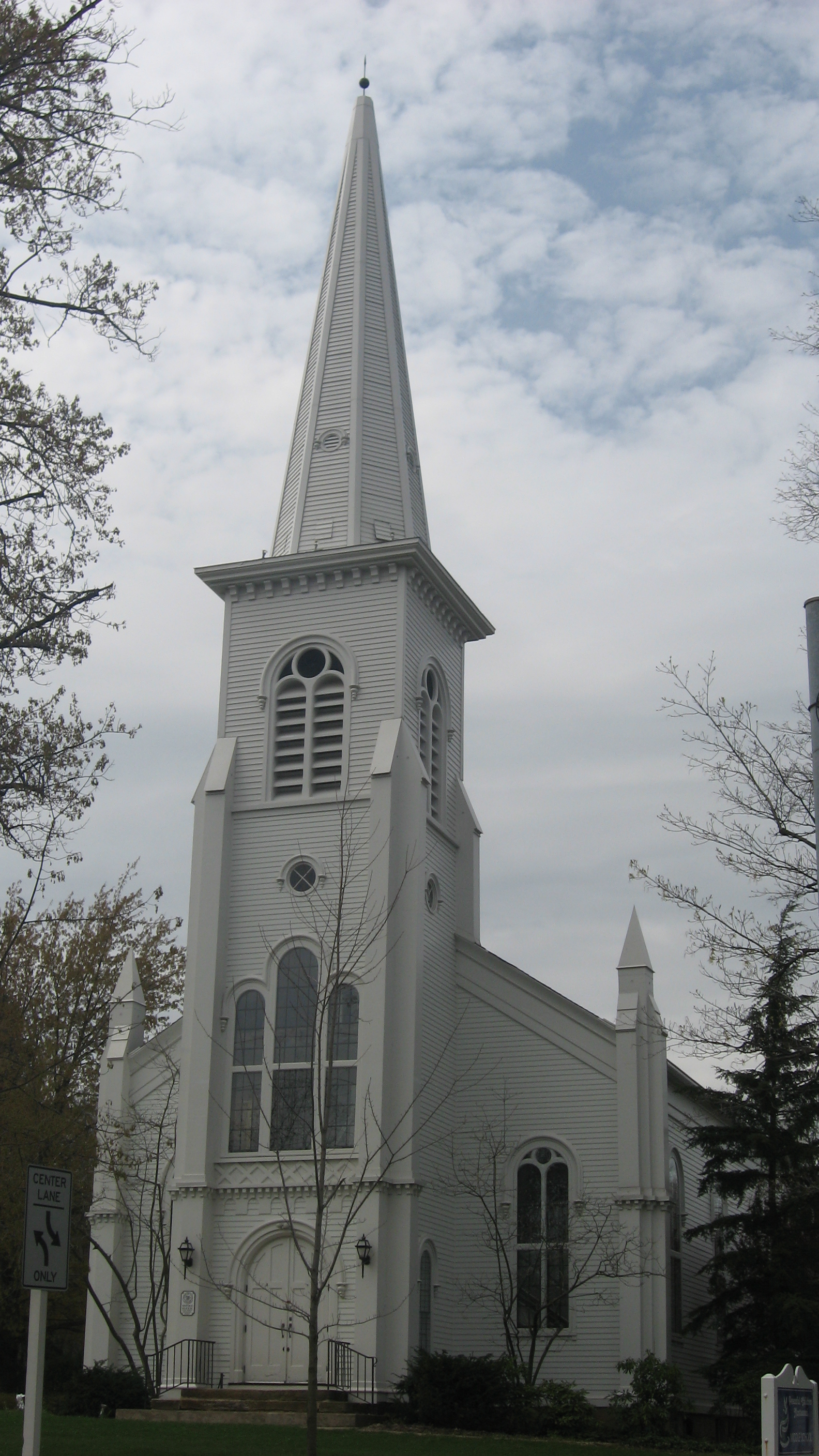
- Front of the church

- Location within Ohio Location within the United States
- Location: 9802 Chillicothe Rd., Kirtland, Ohio, U.S.
- Coordinates: 41°36′16″N 81°21′1″W
- Area: 1 acre (0.40 ha)
- Built: 1859
- Architectural style: Romanesque Revival, Carpenter Gothic
- NRHP reference No.: 73001485
- Added to NRHP: September 20, 1973

Old South Church is a historic church at 9802 Chillicothe Road in Kirtland, Ohio, United States.

It was built in 1859 with Romanesque and Carpenter Gothic elements and added to the National Register of Historic Places in 1973.

It was built on the site of the first church in Kirtland, which was a log cabin built by the first congregation, which formed in 1819. It has a gable roof and a three-story tower topped by an octagonal spire.

The congregation is currently affiliated with the United Church of Christ.
