= Methodist Episcopal Church of Painesville =

Historic church in Ohio, United States

- Methodist Episcopal Church of Painesville, The
- U.S. National Register of Historic Places
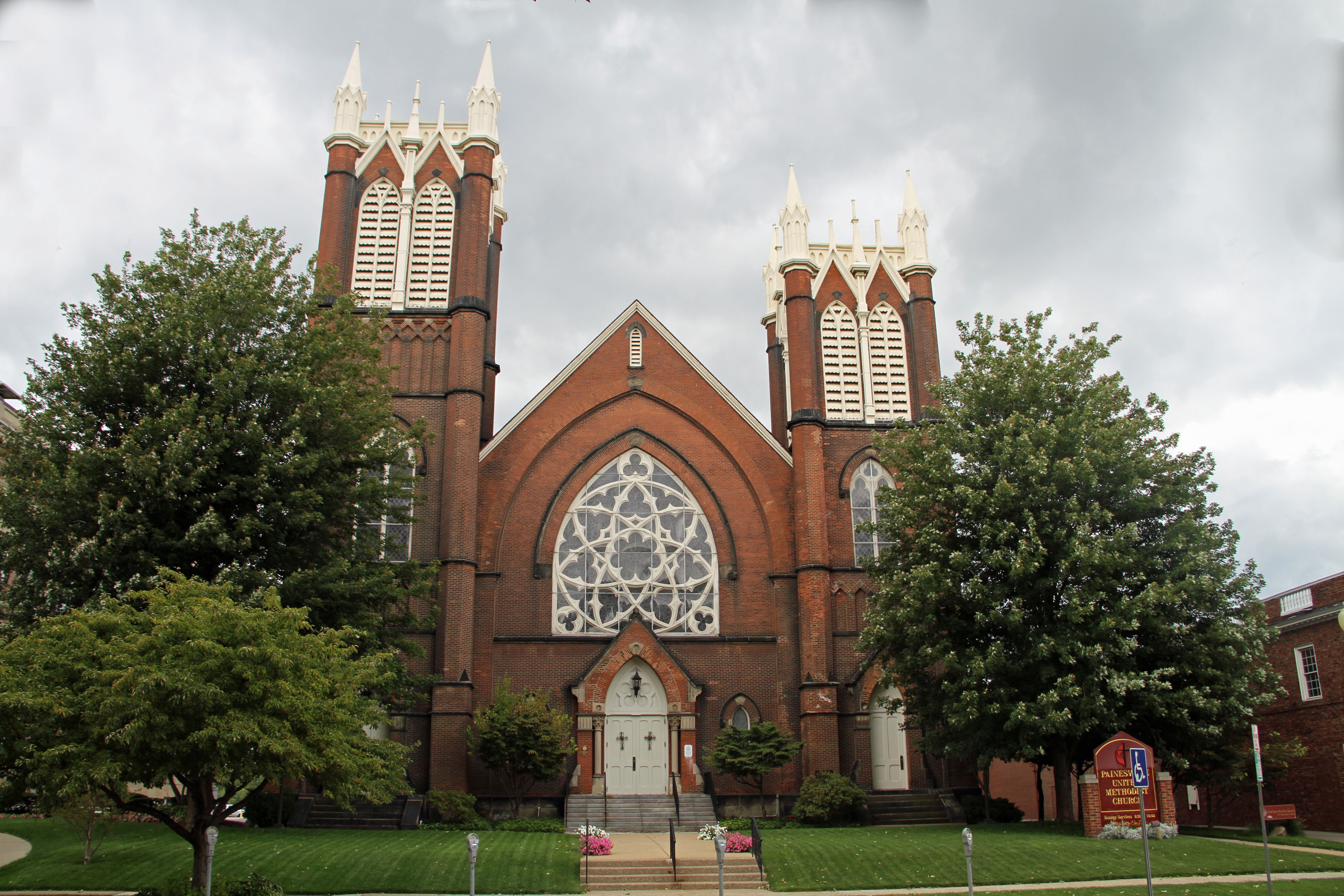

- Location within Ohio Location within the United States
- Location: 71 N. Park Place, Painesville, Ohio
- Coordinates: 41°43′31″N 81°14′40″W
- Area: less than one acre
- Built: 1873
- Architect: Jacob Snyder, Ira J. Lewis
- Architectural style: Gothic Revival
- NRHP reference No.: 98000043
- Added to NRHP: January 30, 1998

The Methodist Episcopal Church of Painesville (also known as Painesville United Methodist Church) is a historic church building at 71 N. Park Place in Painesville, Ohio.

It was built in 1873 in a Gothic Revival style and added to the National Register of Historic Places in 1998.
