= Perry, Ohio =

- Village
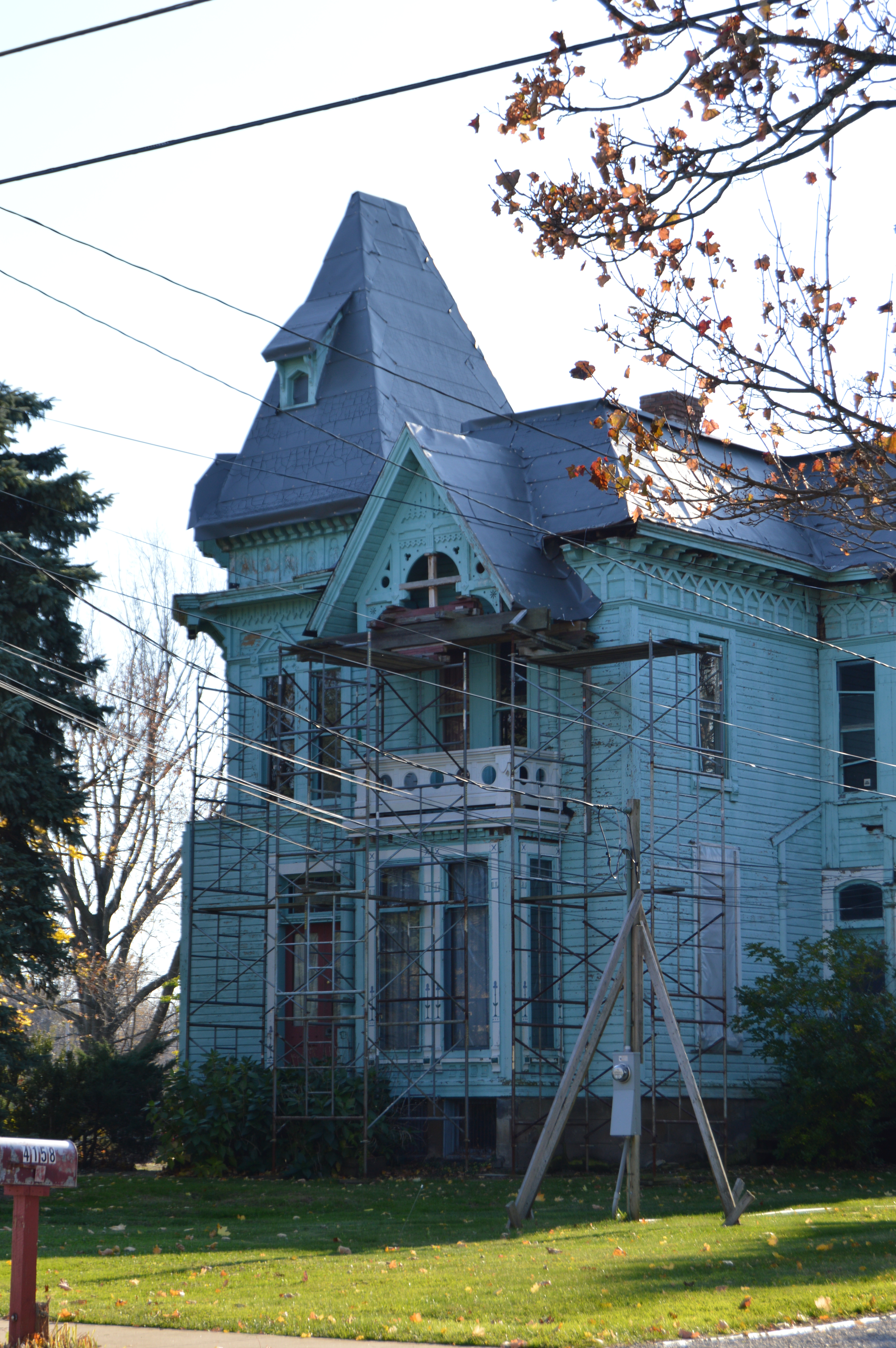
- The Lucius Green House, built 1880
- Motto: "Together We Take Pride"
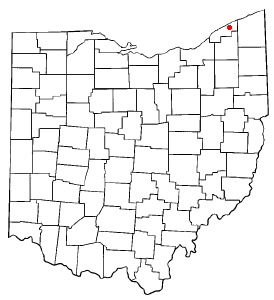
- Location of Perry, Ohio

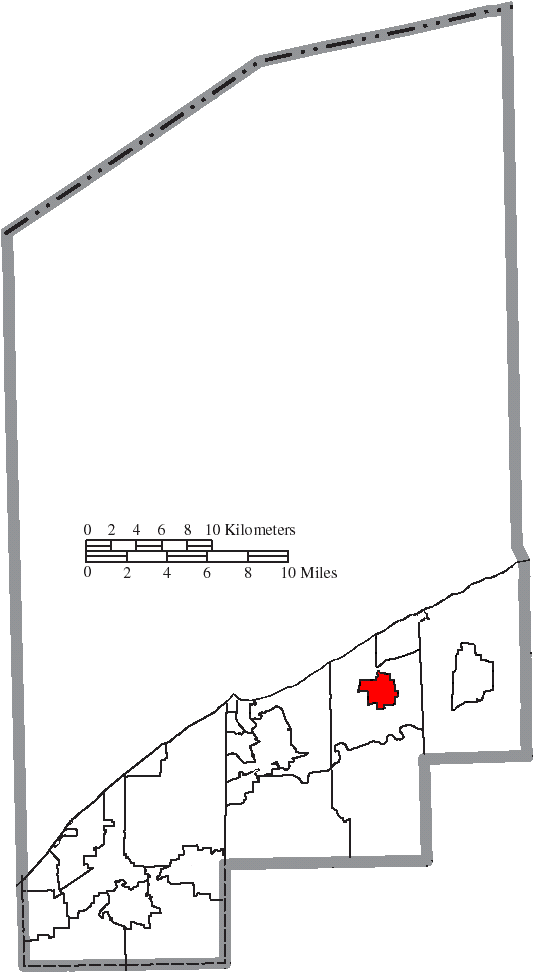
- Location of Perry in Lake County
- Coordinates: 41°45′49″N 81°08′35″W
- Country: United States
- State: Ohio
- County: Lake
- Township: Perry

Government
  - Type: Mayor–council government
  - Mayor: James Gessic

Area
  - Total: 2.27 sq mi (5.88 km^{2})
  - Land: 2.27 sq mi (5.88 km^{2})
  - Water: 0 sq mi (0.00 km^{2})
- Elevation: 699 ft (213 m)

Population (2020)
  - Total: 1,602
  - Density: 706/sq mi (272.5/km^{2})
- Time zone: UTC-5 (Eastern (EST))
  - Summer (DST): UTC-4 (EDT)
- ZIP code: 44081
- Area code: 440
- FIPS code: 39-61882
- GNIS feature ID: 1086431
- Website: perryvillageohio.com

Perry is a village in Lake County, Ohio, United States. The population was 1,602 at the 2020 census.

== History ==
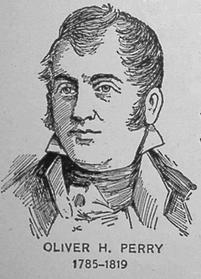
Commodore Oliver Hazard Perry

It is named in honor of Commodore Oliver Hazard Perry to commemorate his victory over the British fleet at the Battle of Lake Erie in September 1813. The battle was a turning point in the western theater during the War of 1812. Perry is known for its public schools, whose recent construction was influenced by the nearby Perry Nuclear Generating Station.

== Geography ==
According to the United States Census Bureau, the village has a total area of 2.18 square miles (5.65 km^{2}), all land.

== Demographics ==
Historical population
Census	Pop.	Note	%±
1880	170		—
1920	473		—
1930	602		27.3%
1940	645		7.1%
1950	665		3.1%
1960	885		33.1%
1970	917		3.6%
1980	961		4.8%
1990	1,012		5.3%
2000	1,195		18.1%
2010	1,663		39.2%
2020	1,602		−3.7%
U.S. Decennial Census

=== 2010 census ===
As of the census of 2010, there were 1,663 people, 593 households, and 456 families living in the village. The population density was 762.8 inhabitants per square mile (294.5/km^{2}). There were 630 housing units at an average density of 289.0 per square mile (111.6/km^{2}). The racial makeup of the village was 96.1% White, 0.8% African American, 1.4% Asian, 0.6% from other races, and 1.1% from two or more races. Hispanic or Latino of any race were 2.6% of the population.

There were 593 households, of which 40.3% had children under the age of 18 living with them, 60.7% were married couples living together, 12.0% had a female householder with no husband present, 4.2% had a male householder with no wife present, and 23.1% were non-families. 20.4% of all households were made up of individuals, and 8.5% had someone living alone who was 65 years of age or older. The average household size was 2.78 and the average family size was 3.21.

The median age in the village was 39.9 years. 28.8% of residents were under the age of 18; 6.7% were between the ages of 18 and 24; 23.8% were from 25 to 44; 30.2% were from 45 to 64; and 10.6% were 65 years of age or older. The gender makeup of the village was 49.6% male and 50.4% female.

=== 2000 census ===
As of the census of 2000, there were 1,195 people, 426 households, and 325 families living in the village. The population density was 548.2 inhabitants per square mile (211.7/km^{2}). There were 438 housing units at an average density of 200.9 per square mile (77.6/km^{2}). The racial makeup of the village was 98.41% White, 0.08% African American, 0.17% Native American, 0.67% Asian, 0.25% from other races, and 0.42% from two or more races. Hispanic or Latino of any race were 0.42% of the population. 20.7% were of German, 16.0% Italian, 12.9% English, 10.5% Irish and 6.0% American ancestry according to Census 2000.

There were 426 households, out of which 42.0% had children under the age of 18 living with them, 64.1% were married couples living together, 8.7% had a female householder with no husband present, and 23.7% were non-families. 20.0% of all households were made up of individuals, and 7.5% had someone living alone who was 65 years of age or older. The average household size was 2.81 and the average family size was 3.24.

In the village, the population was spread out, with 30.3% under the age of 18, 6.2% from 18 to 24, 29.9% from 25 to 44, 24.5% from 45 to 64, and 9.1% who were 65 years of age or older. The median age was 38 years. For every 100 females there were 94.3 males. For every 100 females age 18 and over, there were 91.9 males.

The median income for a household in the village was $52,955, and the median income for a family was $58,281. Males had a median income of $41,898 versus $28,672 for females. The per capita income for the village was $22,078. About 1.5% of families and 2.7% of the population were below the poverty line, including 2.6% of those under age 18 and 1.9% of those age 65 or over.

== Government ==
Perry village has an elected mayor and council form of government.

Perry is served by the Perry Local School District. The District includes Perry High School.

In 2005, the Perry Public Library loaned more than 245,000 items to its 8,000 cardholders. Total holdings are over 52,000 volumes with over 275 periodical subscriptions.

== Notable people ==
- William B. Allison, U.S. congressman from Iowa
- Brandon Staley, former head coach of the Los Angeles Chargers and current defensive coordinator of the New Orleans Saints
- Cecil V. Thomas, first president of Fenn College
- Guy Wyman, founder of the community of Navarre, Florida
- Luke Farrell, active tight end for the San Francisco 49ers
- Anthony Kukwa, former long snapper for the Houston Texans
