= Perry High School (Perry, Ohio) =

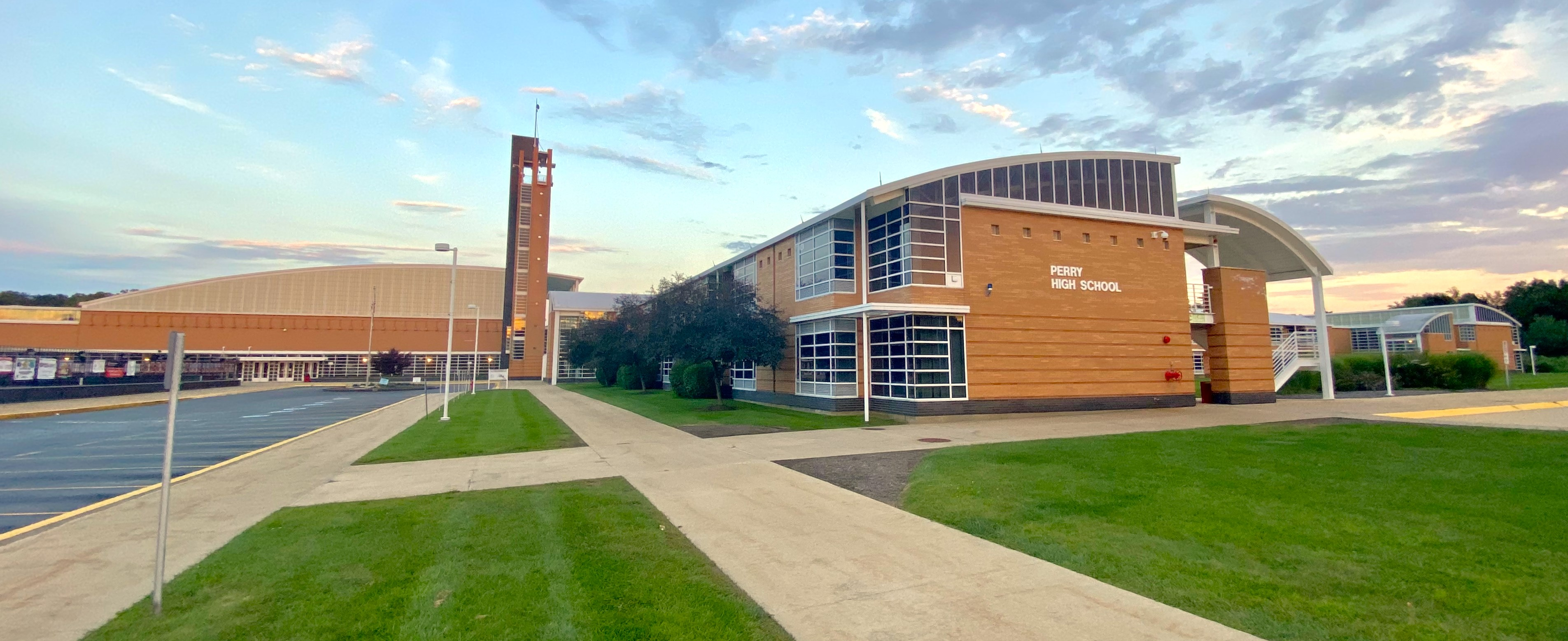

Location
- One Success Boulevard; Perry, Ohio 44081; United States; 41°46′23″N 81°8′25″W

Information
- Type: Public, coeducational
- School district: Perry Local School District
- Principal: Todd Porcello
- Teaching staff: 74.34 (FTE)
- Grades: 9-12
- Enrollment: 1,456 (2024-2025)
- Student to teacher ratio: 19.59
- Colors: Scarlet red and white
- Fight song: Dear Old Nebraska U
- Athletics: Football, basketball, baseball, wrestling, volleyball, softball, swimming and diving, cheerleading, soccer, track, cross country, tennis, golf
- Athletics conference: Chagrin Valley Conference
- Team name: Pirates
- Rival: Madison Blue Streaks, Riverside Beavers
- Accreditation: Ohio Department of Education
- Website: phs.perry-lake.org

Perry High School is a public high school located in Perry, Ohio, United States. It is the only high school in the Perry Local School District. Perry High School is located next to the middle school and Elementary school. The school's athletic teams are nicknamed the Pirates and compete in the Chagrin Valley Conference.

== Athletics ==
=== State championships ===
Perry High School alumni hold many individual state championships, including:

- Football - 2023

== Alumni ==
- Kyle Beyer - college football coach
- Luke Farrell (class of 2016) - professional football player in the National Football League (NFL)
- Todd Kapostasy (class of 2002) - nine-time Sports Emmy winning film producer
- Brandon Staley (class of 2001) - former head coach in the NFL
