= Madison, Ohio =

- Village
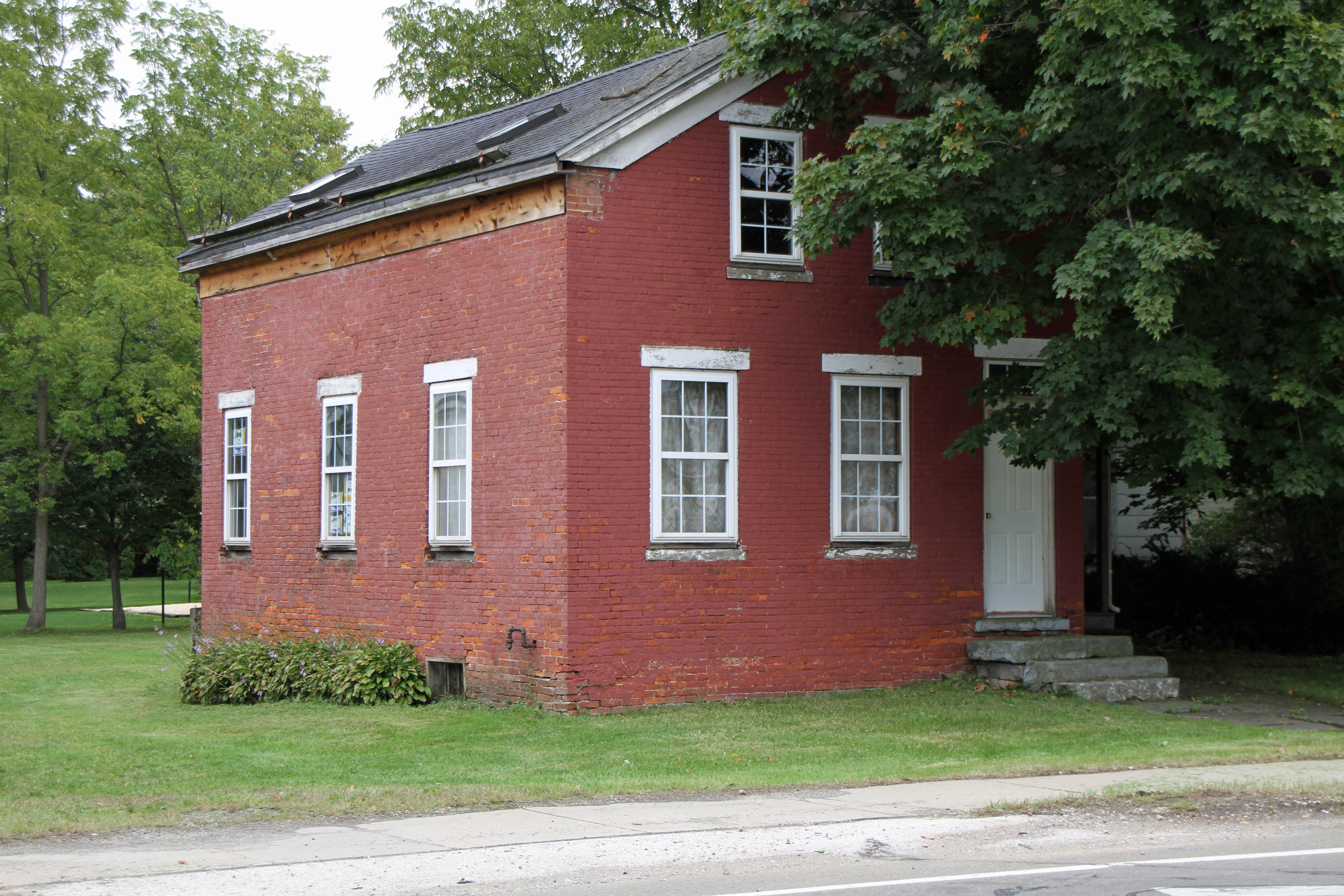
- Old Brick School

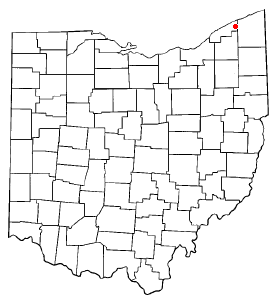
- Location of Madison, Ohio

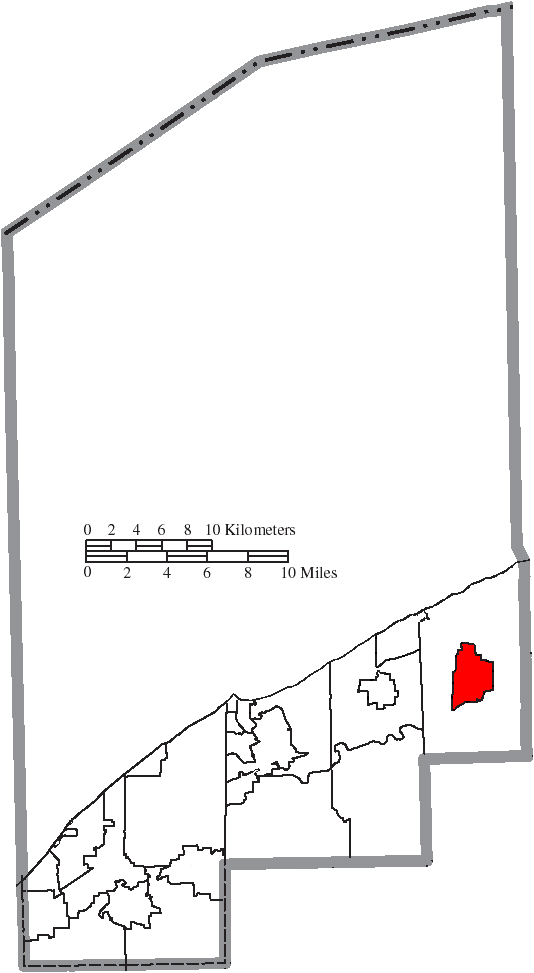
- Location of Madison in Lake County
- Coordinates: 41°46′18″N 81°3′11″W
- Country: United States
- State: Ohio
- County: Lake
- Township: Madison

Government
  - Mayor: Sam Britton (R)

Area
  - Total: 5.08 sq mi (13.17 km^{2})
  - Land: 5.08 sq mi (13.17 km^{2})
  - Water: 0 sq mi (0.00 km^{2})
- Elevation: 728 ft (222 m)

Population (2020)
  - Total: 3,435
  - Density: 675.3/sq mi (260.73/km^{2})
- Time zone: UTC-5 (Eastern (EST))
  - Summer (DST): UTC-4 (EDT)
- ZIP code: 44057
- Area code: 440
- FIPS code: 39-46480
- GNIS feature ID: 1061460
- Website: www.madisonvillage.org

Madison is a village in Lake County, Ohio, United States. The population was 3,435 at the 2020 census.

Madison was incorporated as a village in 1867.

== Geography ==
According to the United States Census Bureau, the village has a total area of 5.09 square miles (13.18 km^{2}), all land.

== Demographics ==
Historical population
Census	Pop.	Note	%±
1870	757		—
1880	793		4.8%
1890	738		−6.9%
1900	768		4.1%
1910	863		12.4%
1920	893		3.5%
1930	927		3.8%
1940	979		5.6%
1950	1,127		15.1%
1960	1,347		19.5%
1970	1,678		24.6%
1980	2,291		36.5%
1990	2,477		8.1%
2000	2,921		17.9%
2010	3,184		9.0%
2020	3,435		7.9%
U.S. Decennial Census

=== 2020 census ===
As of the 2020 census, Madison had a population of 3,435. The median age was 42.5 years. 23.6% of residents were under the age of 18 and 17.9% of residents were 65 years of age or older. For every 100 females there were 96.5 males, and for every 100 females age 18 and over there were 93.4 males age 18 and over.

68.7% of residents lived in urban areas, while 31.3% lived in rural areas.

There were 1,354 households in Madison, of which 31.0% had children under the age of 18 living in them. Of all households, 52.7% were married-couple households, 15.4% were households with a male householder and no spouse or partner present, and 24.3% were households with a female householder and no spouse or partner present. About 26.5% of all households were made up of individuals and 12.6% had someone living alone who was 65 years of age or older.

There were 1,434 housing units, of which 5.6% were vacant. The homeowner vacancy rate was 1.6% and the rental vacancy rate was 5.0%.

Racial composition as of the 2020 census
Race	Number	Percent
White	3,097	90.2%
Black or African American	47	1.4%
American Indian and Alaska Native	6	0.2%
Asian	23	0.7%
Native Hawaiian and Other Pacific Islander	1	0.0%
Some other race	38	1.1%
Two or more races	223	6.5%
Hispanic or Latino (of any race)	103	3.0%

=== 2010 census ===
As of the 2010 census there were 3,184 people, 1,241 households, and 903 families living in the village. The population density was 625.5 inhabitants per square mile (241.5/km^{2}). There were 1,323 housing units at an average density of 259.9 per square mile (100.3/km^{2}). The racial makeup of the village was 96.3% White, 0.6% African American, 0.1% Native American, 0.5% Asian, 0.8% from other races, and 1.6% from two or more races. Hispanic or Latino of any race were 1.5% of the population.

There were 1,241 households, of which 34.6% had children under the age of 18 living with them, 58.5% were married couples living together, 11.0% had a female householder with no husband present, 3.2% had a male householder with no wife present, and 27.2% were non-families. 23.7% of all households were made up of individuals, and 10.5% had someone living alone who was 65 years of age or older. The average household size was 2.55 and the average family size was 2.98.

The median age in the village was 41.1 years. 25.2% of residents were under the age of 18; 5.6% were between the ages of 18 and 24; 26.4% were from 25 to 44; 28% were from 45 to 64; and 14.7% were 65 years of age or older. The gender makeup of the village was 47.5% male and 52.5% female.

=== 2000 census ===
As of the 2000 census there were 2,921 people, 1,107 households, and 801 families living in the village. The population density was 638.1 inhabitants per square mile (246.4/km^{2}). There were 1,171 housing units at an average density of 255.8 per square mile (98.8/km^{2}). The racial makeup of the village was 90.45% White, 8.36% African American, 0.14% Native American, 0.21% Asian, 0.14% from other races, and 0.72% from two or more races. Hispanic or Latino of any race were 0.82% of the population. 22.0% were of German, 14.4% Irish, 13.0% American, 10.4% English, 9.1% Italian and 6.9% Polish ancestry according to Census 2000. There were 1,107 households, out of which 35.1% had children under the age of 18 living with them, 61.1% were married couples living together, 7.9% had a female householder with no husband present, and 27.6% were non-families. 24.0% of all households were made up of individuals, and 10.7% had someone living alone who was 65 years of age or older. The average household size was 2.61 and the average family size was 3.11

In the village, the population was spread out, with 26.2% under the age of 18, 6.0% from 18 to 24, 31.7% from 25 to 44, 23.3% from 45 to 64, and 12.7% who were 65 years of age or older. The median age was 37 years. For every 100 females there were 98.7 males. For every 100 females age 18 and over, there were 96.8 males.

The median income for a household in the village was $50,786, and the median income for a family was $56,761. Males had a median income of $43,897 versus $25,639 for females. The per capita income for the village was $20,621. About 2.3% of families and 3.4% of the population were below the poverty line, including 3.2% of those under age 18 and 2.5% of those age 65 or over.

== Notable people ==
- Lauren Bernard, professional ice hockey player in the PWHL
- Rosa Miller Avery (1830–1894), American abolitionist, political reformer, suffragist, writer
- Steve LaTourette, former member of the U.S. House of Representatives, representing Ohio's 14th congressional district.
- Frederick Burr Opper, a pioneer of U.S. newspaper comic strips.
- John Spano, American businessman, one time owner of the NHL's New York Islanders and admitted fraudster.
- Rachel Jamison Webster, an award-winning poet, writer, and teacher affiliated with Northwestern University.
