= Historic country estates in Lake County, Ohio =

Location of Lake County in Ohio

This is a list of historic country estates in Lake County, Ohio built between the years 1895 and 1930. Around 1885 the city of Cleveland, Ohio was home to an estimated 70 millionaires. While, at the same time, within three mile radius of the city of Willoughby in neighboring Lake Co. there were none, however, by 1918 there were then over 30 millionaires using large estates as their summer homes.

This wave of wealthy families migrating out to Lake County had many causes. As James Borchert wrote in the Encyclopedia of Cleveland History

Electrified streetcar development in the late 1880s transformed the metropolis. Three times faster than horse-drawn streetcars (15 vs. 5 mph), they permitted radial suburban development up to 10(–20) miles from the city center. The new technology arrived as Cleveland confronted a series of challenges: huge migrations from Southern and Eastern Europe; industrial and business expansion into residential neighborhoods; pollution from new industries; and corrupt government. Urbanites looked to the suburbs as both rural haven and escape from urban disorder. Unlike previous suburban developments, streetcar suburbs deliberately distanced themselves from the city. Privately owned, franchised electric streetcar companies (often controlled by land developers) laid out tracks on EUCLID AVE.

This resulted in bringing major changes to the county's westernmost villages and townships.

On the front page of the Painesville Telegraph dated Thursday, April 16, 1903, under the heading "Mentor Real Estate" was the following.

Demand For Good Residence property has put up the price.
Few people are aware that real estate in Mentor is worth several times as much as in Painesville. The demand, by prominent Cleveland people, for residence property along the C. P. & E. railway is what has put prices up on Mentor real estate, and now $1,000 an acre is considered cheap in many instances.
The improvements, which Clevelander people have made and are making on the lands which they have purchased, has also had much to do with advance in price.
In 1892 real estate in Mentor was no higher than here, but since the construction of the electric railway, prices have gone steadlly [sic] upward.

== Map of estates' locations ==
The country estates were so densely packed into the western portion of Lake County that you could walk from the ReedHurst Estate on the Panesville-Mentor Line to Hillandale on the Wickliffe-Euclid line, a distance of some 12 miles, staying entirely on estate's property with only the need to occasionally cross a country dirt road.

A map showing the locations of the Historic country estates in Lake County, Ohio

== Estate details (66 of 70) ==
Estate	Image	Owner	Occupations	Year Build	Sq. Ft. - Rooms	Status	Architect	Acreage	City	Location	Maps
Hawgood's Summer Estate	No available image	Hawgood, Captain Arthur Harrison.(1865-1945) and(M-1892); Belle L. (Dibley)(1869-1941); Owners(1903-1916) Hawgood, Harry Bourn(1887-1939) and Nellie Doan (Shepard)(1888-1971) Owners(1916-1971)	Owner of several Great Lakes Ships. Manager of the Minerva Steamship Company and Later with brothers owner of The Commonwealth Steamship company Belle was a painter, also made important contributions to regional botany by collecting specimens. Donated Collection to Cleveland Museum of Natural History	@1900	00000-00	Demolished, Now a shopping Center	Architect Unknown	64	Painesville Township	1555 Mentor Ave. Winter Residence: 1942 E. 107th street	1915 Atlas Painesville Twp. Tract-4, Lot-45
Cherry Farms	The Home of Frank W. Hart in Painesville Township, Ohio @1903	Hart, Frank W. (1853-1910) and (M-1877) Jennie (Griswold)(1856-1942) Owners(1897- )	owner of a wholesale millinery business Cattle Breeder	1841; Updated:1900	00000	Hellriegel's Inn	Architect unknown	112	Painesville Township	1040 Mentor Ave	1898 Atlas Painesville Twp T-4, L-38, 39
Old Orchard Farm	Old Orchard was the summer home of W. H. Silverthorn	SILVERTHORN, William H.(1850-1910) and Fannie White(1853-1916)	President and a member of the executive committee of the Railway Steel-Spring Co.	1900	00000	Demolished 1983	Architect Unknown	200	Painesville Township	Mentor Ave. C, P & E interurban stop 71 Winter Residence: 127 Ingleside Ave.	1915 Atlas Painesville Twp T-4, L-32, 38, 43
Parmelee Farm	Front entrance James C. Parmelee estate James C. Parmelee estate's front cobblestone wall Jackson street Mentor, Oh	Parmelee, James C. (1855-1931) and (M-1900); Alice Woolfolk Maury (1863-1940); Owners(1901-1940)	Helped start the National Carbon Company, Fourth president of the Cleveland General Electric Company, First President of the Cleveland Stock Exchange; He and his wife Alice were benefactors of the Washington National Cathedral, and Smithsonian Institution in Washington D.C.	1826 / @1930	00000 / 4,270.	First House demolished 1930's, Care Takes House enlarged and remodeled. From 1940 to 1960 it was part of Cole's Nursery, Now a Private Residence.	Architect Unknown	200	Mentor	9573 Jackson St.	Mentor Twp. Track-6, Lot-5,8
Gilchrist Estate	Images from 1903	GILCHRIST, Captain Joseph Clough(1850-1919) and (M2 -1890); Emille Martin(1863-1964)	Owned Gilchrist Transportation Co. Second largest shipping fleet on Great lakes. President Coal & Iron National Bank	@1840	00000	Demolished @1970. Now Lake Health and Mentor Surgery Center.	Architect unknown	26 Painesville Twp. 50 Mentor Twp.	Painesville Township, & Mentor	9500 Mentor Ave. C. P. and E. Between stop 67 & 68	1915 Atlas Painesville TWP T-4 L-37, 1915 Atlas Page 53-Mentor Twp. T-6 L-3
Reedhurst	Reedhurst was the summer home of Fredrick Nicholas Reed in Mentor, OH	Reed, Frederick Nicholas(1853-1905) and Jennie F.(1856-1928)	Reed Brothers & Co. Director Gentlemen's Driving Park Co.	1900	7,500	Demolished 1974	Frank D. Skell	125	Mentor	1/2 mile South of Mentor Ave., East of Chillicothe Rd.41°40′27.5″N 81°17′58″W; Winter Residence: 735 Genesee Ave.	1915 Atlas Page 53-Mentor Twp. Russell Lot
Twin Maples	@1873 @1922	Luther, L. Cook(1853-1905) and Clara B. Sylvester(1853-1915); Owners (1883-1903) Hawgood William Alfred(1863-1916) and Bessie Flower(1868-1951); Owners (1903-1918) Luetkemeyer, Edmund Henry(1862-1934) and(M-1908); Mathilde(1871-1941); Owners (1918-1941)	Owner L. L. Cook & Brothers Hawgood was Partners with his brothers in several Lake Eire Shipping Companies Vice-President Luetkemeyer Company, president of the Country Auto Club, a member of the Cleveland Chamber of Commerce, Cleveland Athletic Club, and Cleveland Yacht Club. Later Lockwood-Luetkemeyer-Henry Company	1825	3,700	Saved in 1961 by being relocated. Now Private Residence.	Jonathan Goldsmith	47 25	Mentor	S.W Corner Mentor Ave. and Chillocathe Rd. C. P. and E. stop 66 Relocated .5 mile to 9364 Forstyhe lane Hawgood Winter Residence: E. 89th street Cleveland, Luetkemyer Winter Residence: 1899 E. 93rd Cleveland.	1915 Atlas Mentor Twp. Russel Lot
Corning Estate 1912 Andrews Estate 1919	Henry W. Coning summer house in Mentor, Oh @1903 The Henry W Corning summer house after the sun rooms were added @1912	Corning, Henry Wick(1869-1946) and Edith Warren( -1953) Andrews, Earl John( -1938) and Clar B.	President of Standard Sewing Machine, director of First National Bank, the Guardian Savings and Trust Company, the Union Trust Company, and the Adams-Bagnall Electric Company. Architech/Builder	1912	00000	Demolished 1990	Architect Unknown	30	Mentor	9232 Mentor Ave.	1915 Atlas Mentor Twp. Russell Lot
Dellhurst	Dellhurst Mentor, Ohio Residence of Mr Harvey H. Brown Images from 1903	Van Cleve, Herman B. (1860-1930) and(m. 1892); Adele Livingston (Battershall)(1866-) Owners(1895-1910) Brown, Harvey Huntington Sr.(1848-1923) and(M-); Elizabeth Freeman (Hickox)(1851-1912) Owners(1910-1923)	Owner Building Supply, Major Glass Distributor Owner: Harvey H. Brown & Co.	1895	00000	Demolished 1974; Functioned as Dellhurst Hospital in the 1930s	Arthur N. Oviatt	77 45	Mentor	Mentor Ave C. P. & E. Stop 62 Brown's Winter Residence: 2727 Euclid Ave.	16A-18TWP_2
Clover Farm	No available image	Osborne, Francis Marion (1854-1911) and Dollie Philpot Morris(1858-1928) (Owners -1918) Osborne, Francis Marion Jr (1893-1963) and(M-1915); Florence T.(1894-1973); Owners(1918-1940)	President Youghiogheny & Ohio Coal Company, President Gilchrist Transportation Co. Built Lost Nation Golf Course; The Osborne Dairy Store	1864	00000	Osborne Park, Lost Nation Golf Course; Lost Nation Airport	Architect Unknown	25-337	Willoughby	38883 HODGSON RD, Lost Nation Golf Course and 38575 Lakeshore Boulevard	1898 Atlas Douglas Tract Lot-3; 1915 Atlas Willoughby Twp. Douglas Tract Lot-3,6,9,10,13
Murray Homestead	Images from 1903, Images from 2019	Murry, William Parmelee(1854-1918) and(M-1877); Jeanie L. Castle(1854-1949)	Director of Pickands Mather Group Coal Department, One of the founders of the Cleveland Athletic Club	1847	00000	Demolished 1985	Architect Unknown	600	Mentor	Home Stead 8501 Mentor Ave C.P.& E. stop 58. Stock Farm C.P.& E. stop 56.	1915 Atlas Mentor Village Huntington, Goodell, Simmons and Church Lots
Miller Estate	Images from 1903	Miller, Leonard B.(1861 -1936) and Mary A. (Denison)	Manager Oglebay Norton & Co., Charter Member Kirtland and Mayfield Country Clubs	@1903	00000	Demolished 1975. Replaced by the Mentor Medical Park.	Architect Unknown	80	Mentor	8224 Mentor Ave. C.P.& E. stop 55	Mentor Village Bacon Lot
Indian Hill	Main house on the summer estate of John E. Newell in Mentor, Ohio View of John E. Newell's estate house from across the pond @1903	Newell, John Edmund(1861-1949) and(M-1891); Amie Sikes Carpenter(1865-1938)	President Jefferson Coal Company, trustee for the Society Savings Ami was executive vice-president of the national Garden Club and Founder of the Women's Protective Association	1899	00000	House Demolished 1958, Eleanor B Garfield Park	Arthur N. Oviatt	60	Mentor	7967 Mentor Ave. C.P.& E. stop 54.	1915 Atlas Mentor Village Ward Lot
WELLCOMFIELD Good Hold Farm	Images from 1903	Wellman, Samual T. (1847-1919) and (M-1868); Julia A. Ballard; Owners(1899-1906) Holden, Liberty Emery(1833-1913) and Delia Elizabeth Bulkley (1838-1932); Owners(1906-1913)	American Steel industry pioneer, Founded the Wellman-Seaver-Morgan Engineering Company, prolific inventor Owner Cleveland Plain Dealer, Hollenden Hotel, Responsible for Construction of Cleveland Museum of Art, Mining and Real estate Investor, Founder of Bratenahal	1850	00000	Burned down 1929	Architect Unknown	1,200	Mentor	7767 Mentor Ave. C.P.& E. stop 52.	Mentor T-5 Huntington and Blake Lots
Mooreland NRHP #88000209	Exterior Video 2016	Moore, Edward William ( 1864-1928) and (M-1891); Louise Chamberlin(1870-1956) Owners(1898-1956)	Vice-president of the Western Reserve Trust Co., Partner Everett-Moore syndicate that managed Cleveland Electric Railway Company. CLEVELAND, PAINESVILLE & EASTERN 1895, Detroit United Railway, Chicago Aurora and Elgin Railroad	1898	20,000	Educational Business Event Center	Arthur N. Oviatt 1898 J. Milton Dyer1906	1,100	Mentor	7960 Garfield Rd	1915 Mooreland Estate
Kingwood Farm	Kingwood The summer home of Harry Wheelock King in Lake County, OH @1912	King, Harry Wheelock(1863-1928) and Margery Gundry(1866-1950); Owners(1904-1944) Monroe, Logan Sr(1897 -1987) and(M-1918) Kathleen(1899 - 1987); Owners(1944-1975)	President King Bridge Company Vice-President Eaton Corp and Co-Owner Kingwood Nurseries'	1903	0000-28 Rooms	Demolished @1980	Abram Garfield	775 100	Kirtland Hills & Mentor	Center Street	1915 Kirtland TWP
Primrose Hill Nortonwood	David Z. Norton's country estate house Nortonwood in 1912	Andrews Horace Elisworth (1863-1918) and Antoinette Huntington Devereux (1863-1955); Owners(1898-1910) Norton, David Z.(1851-1928) and [Mary Castle(m-1871)(1854-1928)] Owners(1910-1928)	Vice-President Standard Oil / President of The Big Con Partner Oglebay Norton & Co; President of the Citizens Savings and Trust Company.	1898	0000	Primrose Hill Demolished 1966-67 Nortonwood Demolished 2019	Arthur N. Oviatt	157 300	Mentor	Garfield Rd.	
Kenridge		Bolton, Charles Chester(1855-1930) and(M-1880); Julie Castle(1857-1929); Owners(1914-1930) Bolton, Chester Castle and(M-1907); Frances Payne(1885-1977)	Partner in M. A. Hanna Company Business Industrialist, United States Republican Congressman from Ohio 22d District 1929-1937 United States Congresswoman from Ohio 22d District 1940-1969, Funded a school of nursing at Western Reserve University	1848(Family Home moved from Euclid Ave, Cleveland to Center St. Mentor 1915)	00000	Demolished	Architect unknown	80	Mentor	8020 CENTER ST	Mentor Village T-2, L-9
Courtyard	No available image	Bolton, Newell Castle(1888 - 1947 ) and(M- ) Frances Bray Todd (1896-1983); Owners(1929-1950) Bolton, Oliver (1917 -1972) and(M- ) Adelaide Brownlee ( - )Owners(1950-1978) Bolton, Charles P.(1942 - ) and(M- ) Julia( - )(m-1976) Owners(1978 - Present)	Army Brigadier General, Executive at Republic steel Director at several large Cleveland Companies United States representatives from Ohio's 11th district 1952-1956 Manager of the Office of International Trade for Ohio.	1929	00000	Private Resident	Carl Rowley	100 238	Mentor	8021 Center Street	Mentor Village
Low Ridge Farm	Low Ridge Farms Front Gate 2021 Ralph Perkins house at Low Ridge Farms Low Ridge Farms Rear Gate 2021	Perkins, Jacob Bishop (1854-1936) and Sallie Moore (Wilshire) (1856-1931) Owners(1900-1936)	Attorney, Manager and builder for the Cleveland & Mahoning Railroad, Founder HILL ACME CO. 1886; Honorary Vice President Western Reserve Historical Society	1900	5,334	Private residents	unknown	201	Mentor	8916 Perkins Dr. Winter Residence:490 Euclid Ave. and Edgewater Park	1915 Atlas mentor Twp. T- L-
Wildwood NRHP #81000444		Oliver, John G. ( -1939) and May Lockwood( -1941)	Engineer for Warner & Swasey Company later co-founder of Bardons & Oliver	1908	00000	Wildwood Cultural Center & Park	Abram Garfield	34	Mentor	7645 Little Mountain Rd	1915 Atlas Mentor Twp. Tract 2 Lot-5; 16A-017OLD.pdf (1942)
Chesterfield Greystone Manor	Image from 1960	Scott, Frank Augustus (1873-1949) and(M-1911) Faith Alice Fraser( -1936) Girdler, Tom Mercer(1877-1965) and(M.-1924) Lillian Snowden(M. 1924-1942)	Chairman of the Munitions Standards Board of the Council of National Defense and first chairman of the War Industries Board during World War I, chairman of the board of Warner & Swasey Company President and Chairman of the Board Republic Steel	1919	00000-25 Rooms	Currently Unoccupied. For 34 years it was home to the East Shore Unitarian Church. Around 1996 the House and 100+ acres were merged with the old Newell C. Bolton Estate	Hubbell & Benes	477	Kirtland Hills, & Mentor	7960 Center Street	Mentor Village
Hoyt Estate	No available image	Hoyt Elton James 2nd(1850-1917) and(M-1914); Cornelia Hickox (Brown)(1890 - 1968)	Sr. Managing Partner Pickards Mather & Co.	1920	00000	Private residents	Architect unknown	110	Kirtland Hills	Track 2 Bloss Lot south side of Chilliothe Rd. Kirtland hills 41.644256, -81.329406	Maps
Hilo Farms NRHP #79001870		Hanna, Leonard C. Jr. (1889-1957) Owner(1925-1957)	Executive M. A. Hanna Company, philanthropist, Director Cleveland Museum of Art	1925	7,600	Private residents	unknown	330	Kirtland Hills	9058 Little Mountain Rd.	
ShadyBrook	No available image	Baldwin, Arthur Douglas(1876-1955) and(M-1902); Reba Williams( -1941)	Partner Garfield, Baldwin, Jamison, Hope, & Ulrich.	1926	1,684	Purchased by Holden Arboretum 1956, Used for The Laymen's Retreat Project, Then as Headquarters of The Lake County Historical Society and currently HISTORIC SHADYBROOK HOUSE LLC	Abram Garfield	556	Kirtland Hills	9400 BALDWIN RD 41.637464, -81.29767	1915 Atlas Kirtland TWP T-1 L-13,25,26,39
Stump Hollow Farm	No available image	Hanna, Howard Melville Jr.(1877–1945) and Jean Claire(1882-1973) Owners(1927 -1948)	President & Chairman of M. A. Hanna Company	1927	6055-23	Private Residence	Walker and Weeks	100	Kirtland Hills	9011 Booth Road	Tract-1 Lot-37
Manor House Farm	Morley Manor House eastside 2021 Morley Manor House northside 2021 Morley Manor House garden 2021	Morley, Charles Rockwell(1863-1952) and(M-1923); Hedwig (Hotopf)(1865-1955) Was also his Mothers summer home until her death in 1923; Morley, Helen Marshall (Rockwell)(1834-1923) and(M-1858); Deceased Husband Jesse Healy(1820-1903)	Director Kelly Island Lime & Transport Co., Real Estate operator, Trustee of Lake Erie College, President of The Stark Electric and Cleveland Alliance and Mahoning Valley railroad lines.	C. 1874 Extensively Remodel:C. 1903	00000-23	Lake Erie College's President's house. and George M Humphrey Equestrian Center.	Architect Unknown	335 550	Mentor	8031 Morley Rd; 41.651042°N 81.278562°W Winter Residences: 2914 prospect Ave. S. E. Later Pasadena, Ca.	1915 Altas Concord Twp. Joint Sub District Lots 2,3,8,9,10
The Pinery Pinery Farms	images of Woods home from an online source.	King, Ralph Thrall(1855-1926) and(M-1897); Fanny Tewksbury(1860-1949) Owners:(1901-1949) Two Children later built homes on the Estate:Woods, Frances (Schafer)	President of the Realty Investment Company, Major Donner and vice president of the Cleveland Museum of Art, a trustee of Western Reserve University and the Western Reserve Historical Society, Blish Rd. renamed King Memorial Highway for him.	Ralph & Fanny: 1st 1901, 2ad 1916 Woods: 1928	Ralph & Fanny: 1st:0000-00, 2ad:1,939-6 Wood's: 4,931-	Private Residence's	Architect's Unknown	100 250 321	Kirtland, & Concord	Ralph & Fanny King: 10059 Little Mnt. Rd.41°38′15.3″N 81°16′44.6″W Woods King:10095 Little Mnt. Rd. 41°38′15.3″N 81°16′44.6″W Winter Residence: 2648 Prospect Ave. S. E.	1915 Atlas Mentor Twp. Track-4 Lot-2, 1900 Chardon Township Tax Map Track-4, Lot-2 1927 Chardon Township Tax Map
Roberta Holden Bole's Estate	No available image	BOLE, Benjamin Patterson(1873-1941) and(M-1907); Roberta Holden(1876-1950)	Benjamin:Major U.S. Army, Managed the Liberty Holden Trust(Managed the Cleveland Plain Dealer, Hollenden Hotel Company and was a director of several other corporations.) Reberta:Was the moving spirit behind the founding of the Holden Arboretum in Kirtland. Co-founded the Hawken School for boys in 1915 and was a benefactor of the Cleveland Museum of Natural History.	1925	00000	Private residence and First 100 acres of Holden Arboretum	Architect Unknown	180	Kirtland	9446 Sperry Rd 41.619654, -81.301963	Track-1 Lots-51,52; 24A-010OLD.pdf (1930-1990)
Lantern Court	Lantern Court previous home to Warren H Corning II More Images	Corning, Warren H. II(1902-1975) and (M-1928); Maud Eells Stager(1909-1991)	investment banking, Executive administrator Holden Arboretum	1929	00000-17 Rooms	In 2022 the House and 29 acres were sold by Holden Arboretum to Red Oak Camp.	Edward John Maier	99	Kirtland	9203 Kirtland Chardon Rd.	Kirtland Tract-2 Lot-26,27
Playmore Estate	Images from 2015	Hubell, Benjamin( S. 1857–1935) and(M-1895); Bertha M. Tarbell(1872-1957)	Architect: Played a role in designing the West Side Market and the Cleveland Museum of Art.	1929; Enlarged 2003	7,000 / 13,247	Private residence	Hubbell & Benes	65 / 13	Kirtland	8900 Eagle Road Kirtland. On top of Pierce's Knob (Second highest point in Lake Co.); 41.604093, -81.321296	Kirtland Track-2 Lot-23
Halle Farm	Random Images	Halle, Samuel Horatio(1868-1954) and (M-1901); Blanche Marguerite (Murphy) (1874-1951)	Founder of Halle Brothers Co. Philanthropist Blanche was the author of Art of Entertaining; Managed The Eugene and Blanche Halle Foundation	1912	00000	Penitentiary Glen Nature Center	Architect Unknown	424	Kirtland	8668 Kirtland Chardon Rd Winter Residence: 2163 Harcourt Dr. Cleveland Heights	Kirtland Twp Tract-13 Lot-18
Augustus Estate	EH Augustus Estate by MW Copper, Jr.	Augustus, Ellsworth Hunt(1897-1964) and(M-1920); Frances Elizabeth Good(1889-1981)	Partner in the Kilroy Drilling Company and a director of the National City Bank of Cleveland. President of the National Boy scout Council; He won the district golf championship of Greater Cleveland seven times.	1930	12,600/	Private Residence	Munroe Walker Copper, Jr.	200	Waite Hill	9441 HOBART RD	Kirtland Twp Track 1,2 Lots 1,40
LEO-DORO FARMS	LEO-DORO @1903 was the summer estate of Henry A. Everett. Kirtland Country Club 1910's	Everett, Henry A. (1856-1917) and(M -1886); Josephine Pettengill (1866 - 1938 )	President of Big Consolidated and Lake Shore Electric Railroad Co.	1901	00000	The original wood mansion burned in 1906. The 1910 stone mansion burned in 1975 1910 purchased 309 addition but separated acres.	Architects Unknown	709; 1901:400; 1910 added 309	Kirtland & Mentor	Kirtland Country Club, 41.631473°N 81.377573°W Lake County MetroPark's Chapin Forest Reservation; Gildersleeve Mountain; 41.599412°N 81.361171°W	1915 Map of Everett Estate lands 1915 Atlas Kirtland TWP Lots-15,16,28 and separated Lots-5,83,84-, 1915 Mentor Twp Track-4, Lots 2,7
Winden	Winden in April, 1964	Sherwin, Henry A.( 1842- 1916) and (M-1865); Frances Mary Smith(1843-1920)	Partner, Sherwin, Williams, & Co.	1898	00000	Demolished 1968	Architect unknown	184	Willoughby	4420 Sherwin Rd.	
Elgercon	Images from 1903 Image from 2015 Images from 2017 Fire	Chandler, Harrison Tyler.(1840-1912) and (M-1865); Ellen Frances (Foster)(1842-1912) Tucker, Stanly Wightman(1870-1943 ) and(M-1895); Gertrude Lee (Chandler)(1873-1953)	Served in The Grand Army during the Civil War, Founded Chandler & Price printing press company President Foulton Foundery Company, President S. W. Tucker Company	1900-1913	00000-20	Destroyed by fire 2017, Land used for the Willoughby-Eastlake school district, Lake County YMCA, Willoughby Fire station, Willoughby Police Station and Lake Metroparks' (Gully Brook Park).	Architect Unknown	125	Willoughby	37000 Ridge Road(Rt 84) and Shankland Road	1915 Atlas, Willoughby Twp. Track-10 Lot-4 and P. 127
Harkness Estate	No available image	Harkness, Stephen Vanderburgh(1818-1888) and(M-1854); Anna Maria (Richardson)(1837-1926)	He organized The Euclid Avenue National Bank and was president of Belt Mining Company. In 1867 he made substantial investments in Rockefeller, Andrews & Flagler joining with his half brother Henry Flagler. This company was the forerunner to Standard Oil. Ann founded the Commonwealth Fund; On her Husband's death Ann inherited 1/3 of his 150 Million dollar estate and gave away 40 Million before she died.	@1883	00000-24	Demolished @1948, From 1919 to 1948 it was a summer camp called Camp Harkness, Currently its FirstEnergy's Eastlake Generating Station'	Architect Unknown	222	Eastlake	Erie St. @Eastlake Generating Station , 41.672801, -81.440066; Winter Residence: 6508 Euclid Ave	1898 Atlas Willoughby Twp. Card Track, Lot-22; 1915 Atlas Willoughby Twp.
Cozy Bank	No available image	Weber, Dr Gustave E. Carl(1828-1912) and (M-1854); Ruth Elizabeth Chaney(-1917)	Founder of ST. VINCENT CHARITY HOSPITAL, Trustee and dean of the Medical Dept. at Western Reserve university U.S. consul in Nurnberg, Germany.	C.1897	00000-00	Demolished	Architect Unknown	110	Eastlake, Ohio	1898 Atlas Willoughby Twp. Card Track, Lot-22; 1915 Atlas Willoughby Twp.	
Van Gorder Manor	Van Gorder Manor Willoughby, Ohio 1903	Boyce, Joseph H.(1823-1894) and(M-1856); Julia E. (French)(1837-1903); Owner(1902-1903) Van Gorder , Albert Hapgood(1852-1941) and(M-); Nancy Boyce(1871-1959) Owners(1903-1959)	Proprietor of the Willoughby Flour Mills; Julia E. French was the twin sister of Julius E. French Founder Hall-Van Gorder Co., The Cleveland Fruit Juice Co.	1902	16,365-00	Willoughby House / Julia's 1902	Architect Unknown	15	Willoughby	37819 Euclid Avenue; 41°38′02″N 81°24′39″W	1915 Willoughby Atlas Tract-13 Lot-2
Belle Vernon Farm	Jacob A. Beidler house Willoughby, Ohio 1903	Beidler, Jacob Atlee(1852-1912) and(M-1885); Hannah M.(Rhoads)(1854-1940)	1901-1907 Member of the U.S. House of Representatives from Ohio's 20th district., president of the Belle Vernon-Mapes Dairy Co., Vice president of the Cleveland, Painesville & Eastern Railroad Co., He served as president of the Rhodes & Beidler Coal Co. and as member of the State board of agriculture.	@1881	00000-00	Demolished; Now Willoughby Firestation #3 and Lake Co YMCA	Architect Unknown	300	Willoughby	37000 Euclid Ave. C, P & E Stop 34	1898 Atlas Willoughby Twp. Track-14, Lots-1,2; 1916 Map
Willow Hall Farm 1898 Willoughby Hall 1903	Country Place of Mrs. Thomas Jopling	Jopling, Thomas(1841-1894) and(m-); Mary Clayton(1841-1917) Reginald Furness(1867-1942) and(M-1894)(D-1910) Anna (Marshell)(Schweinfurth)(1870-1928)	Treasure Otis Iron and Steel Company President American Wire Company Vice-President American Wire Company	@1898	00000	Demolished	Architect Unknown	225	Willoughby	36857 Ridge Road	1898 Atlas Willoughby Twp. Track-10, Lots-2-3-4
As You like it	No available image	Haworth, Joseph S.(1855-1903), and William Joseph(1864-1921)( and(M-1901)Sarah Amelia Graham((1880-1960)) Harris, George B.(1881-1970) and(M-); Fannie (Davis)(C.1888-1886) Owners(1920-C.1957)	Haworth's were nationally Known Actors and Playwright Harris was a Lawyer, Common Pleas Court Judge, GOP Chairman for Cuyahoga County Fannie helped found the Cleveland Orchestra	C. 1898; C. 1930	1057-5; 2322-10	Private Residences	Architect Unknown	27	Willoughby	Willoughby RidgeE Rd. 41.61165°N 81.43566°W; Additional Residence(1930): Willoughby Ridge Rd. 41.610498°N 81.435661°W Harris Winter Residence" E. 97th	Haworth:1915 Atlas Track-10, Lot-10 Harris:27A_004
Drury Lane Farm	Images from 1903	Drury, Francis Edson(1850-1932) and(M-1884); Julia Robinson(1859-1943)	Partner Cleveland Foundry Co	1925	7,946	Private residence	Walker and Weeks	65	Waite Hill	6750 WAITE HILL	Tract-9 Lots-1,3
Tannenbaum Farm	Images from 1903	Otis, Charles A. Jr.(1868-1953) and(M-1894); Lucia Edwards(1869-1949)	Stock Broker, President Otis & Co, Owner Cleveland News	<1910	00000	Private Residence	Architect Unknown	480	Waite Hill	6725 Waite Hill Rd.	1915 Atlas Willoughby Twp. Page 81,
South Farm	Images from 2017	Sherwin, 1. John( - ) and (M- ) Frances McIntosh( - ) 2.Francis McIntosh(1906-1969) and(M-1931); Margaret Halle	Banking	1920	11,000	Private Residents	Bryant Fleming	390	Waite Hill	9550 Smith Rd.	1915 Altas Willoughby Twp. Page 81
Treadway Farms	No available image	Treadway, Lyman Hambright(1862-1919) and(M-); Annie May (Wickham)(1868-1951)	President The Peck, Stow & WOcox Co., vice chairman Federal Reserve Bank of Cle.; Director Superior Savings & Trust Co., Peerless Motor Car Co.; President Cleveland Chamber of Commerce.	1896	4,339	Private; Residents	Architect; Unknown	253	Waite Hill	9715 SMITH	Willoughby Twp. Track 5 Lots-1,4,5 Track-9 Lot-8
River Farm Estate	"Squire's Castle", built about 1897 by Feargus B. Squire. As a Gate House.	Squire, Feargus B.(1850-1932) (M-1876); Louisa Christiana Braymaier(1854-1927)	Executive Standard Oil Company and major investor in Steel, Chemical and other Companies Mayor of Wickliffe, Ohio	1890	00000-00	No Main house. Only the gate house was built. Now part of North Chagrin Reservation of the Cleveland Metroparks.	Architect Unknown	550	Willoughby Hills	2844 River Rd, 41.580144°N 81.420945°W Winter Residence:1729 Euclid Avenue, later 7809 Euclid Avenue.	1915 Altas Tract 2, Lots 4,5
Blakeslee Estate	No available image	Blakeslee, John Robert(1875-1970) and(M-1921); Joanna(Hanlon)(1889-1950)	President AJAX Manufacturing Co.	1921	2,042	Private Residence; 52 Aces become part of Cleveland Metroparks North Chagrin Reservation.	Architect Unknown	75	Willoughby Hills	36100 Euclid Chardon Rd. Winter Residence: 1118 St. Clair Ave. N.E.	Lake County Auditor 31A-011OLD2; 31A-003-OLD
Ridgeview	Images from 1903	Clark, Alfred Gleason Sherman (1875-1953) and(M1-1899); Alice Hale (Russell)(1876-1915) Owners(C.1901-C.1915) Humiston, William Henry(1855-1943) and(M-1884); Harriet (Millar)(1859-1940) Owners(C.1915-C.1927)	Real Estate Broker, Specialized in selling country farms to the wealthy, Assistant Director of the Federal Housing Administration, One of the founding members of the Chagrin Valley Hunt Club. Humiston was President Oho Medical Society, Owned Private Surgical Home for Women, Staff Surgeon Charity Hospital	1903	00000-00	Destroyed by Arson 1927. Land used to build I-271 and I-90 interchange.	Builder Michael Heintz	100 200	Willoughby Hills	Chardon Rd. 41°35′05.3″N 81°26′53.2″W Clark Winter Residence: 479 Russell Ave. Humiston Winter Residence: 3041 E. 89th Street.	Clark 1898 Atlas Willoughby Twp Tract-3, Lot-4 Humiston 1915 Atlas Willoughby Twp Tract-3, Lot-4, Track-7, Lot-7
Sleepy Hollow Farm	Sleepy Hollow Farm Front View Sleepy Hollow Farm West Wing Current Images	Hanna, Howard Melville Jr.(1877–1945) and Jean Claire(1882-1973) Owners( -1928)	President & Chairman of M. A. Hanna Company	(1903-1915)	00000	Manakiki Golf Corse	Architect Unknown	200	Willoughby Hills	35501 Eddy Rd.	Track-6 Lot-2,4,9
Gravel Hill Farm	No available image	Russell, George Shelley(1850-1927) and(M-1874); Florence (Hale)(1852-1928)	Treasurer of Cleveland, Columbus, Cincinnati and Indianapolis Ry. Co. Treasurer Cleveland Electric Railway Company. Director American Fork and Hoe Co.	1912	4,206	Private Resident	Architect; Unknown	51.5	Willoughby Hills	35401 Hanna Rd. Winter Residence: 7011 Euclid Ave.	1915 Atlas Willoughby Twp Tract-6, Lot-3
Spring Grove Farm Halle Estate	Spring Grove Farm's main house and barn @1903 Main house Spring Grove Farm the estate of Martin Snider	Snider, Martin(1846-1918-) and(M-1867); Adaline A (Rohrer)(1847-1936); Owners(1902-1917>) Halle, Salmon Portland Chase(1866-1949) and(M-1893); Carrie B. Moss(1872-1965); Owners(-)	Treasure of the Standard Oil Company, Trustee Riverside Cemetery, President Guarantee Title & Trust Co. Founded Halle Brothers Co., Halle served as director of the Mutual Building & Loan Co. and the Service Recorder Company;a founding member of the Print Club of Cleveland, the Cleveland Advertising Club, the Cleveland Hospital Service Association, and the Jewish Federation of Cleveland	@1902	00000-00	Demolished, Now The Lithuanian Center and Pine Ridge Plaza	Architect Unknown	126	Willoughby	Summer: 34251 Ridge Rd. Winter Residence: (7338 and later 8811) Euclid Ave. Cleveland, Oh	1915 Atlas Willoughby Twp. Track-11, Lots3,4
Nagirroc	Front facade of the Corrigan house at Nagirroc	Corrigan, James C. Sr.(1849-1908) (M- ) Ida Belle Allen(1885-1900) Corrigan, James W. Jr.(1880-1928) and (M-1916 ) Laura Mae (1879-1948)	Owner Corrigan-McKinney Steel Co. (which later became Republic Steel and then LTV Steel)	1900	00000	1928 became Pine Ridge Country Club	Architect unknown	400	Wickliffe	30601 Ridge Rd	Willoughby Tracts 7,11 Lots 8,7
Just-A-Mere Farm	No available image	Nutt, Joseph Randolph (1869-1945) and(M-1907); Elizabeth (Hasbronck)(1881-1937) Owners(1916-1933) Nutt, Joseph Randolph Jr.(1909-1972) and(M-1929); Sarah Howell (East)(1911-1998) Owners(1935-C. 1957)	President Citizens Savings and Trust Company, President and board chairman of the Union Trust Co. and Twice treasurer of the Republican National Committee President Dension & Nutt, Builders Captain U.S. Army, Elected to Ohio State Senate 1947-1956	C. 1917	00000-00	House status uncertain. Land developed in 1952 as The Joseph R. Nutt Subdivision.	Architect Unknown	50	Wickliffe	Willoughby Ridge Rd. 41°36′21″N 81°27′14″W Winter Residence: 2285 Coventry Rd., Cleveland Heights	Willoughby Twp. Track-7, Lot-4
Wickliffe-On-The-Bluff	Images from 1903	Dangler, David Edward( 1858-1939) and(M-1885); Effie Mude (Scofield)(1862-1948)	Owner Dangler Stove Company. 1902 it merged with 8 Companies to become the American Stove Company where he had many titles., President Wilson Realty Co., Vice President Union Salt Co.	@1898	00000-00	Demolished @1967	Architect Unknown	45	Wickliffe	30180 OVERLOOK DR; Winter Residence: 3424 Prospect Ave. Later; 2348 Overlook Rd. Cleveland Hts.	1898 Atlas Willoughby Twp. Tract-11, Lot-10
Lakeland	Image @1900	Rockefeller, Frank(1845-1917) and(M-11870); Helen Elizabeth (Scofield)(1848-1932)	Infantryman, 7th Ohio Infantry Regiment, during the Civil War, Vice-President Standard Oil, Cattle Rancher, President Buckeye Steel Castings	@1898	00000-00	Demolished. Now Wickliffe High School	Architect unknown	165	Wickliffe	2255 Rockefeller Road	1898 Atlas Willoughby Twp. Track-7 Lots-1,2,4 and Track-8 Lot-5
Armington Home	No available image	Armington, George Arthur(1865-1954) and(M-1889); Clara (Pritchard)(1869-1946) Louise? (1874-1954)	Instructor at Case School, Partner in Phenix Iron Works, Founded Euclid Crane & Hoist Co.	1923	3096-13	Private Residence	Architect Unknown	Acreage Unknown	Wickliffe	29301 Ridge Road; 41°36′07″N 81°28′09″W	No available Maps
EDPHINE		Burke, Edmund Stevenson Jr.(1879-1962) and(M-1904); Josephine Brainard (Chisholm)(1880-1969)	Owner CORRIGAN-MCKINNEY STEEL CO. (which later became Republic Steel and then LTV Steel) He served as a director of the Federal Reserve Bank of Cleveland from 1933 to 1938 Introduced Polo to Northeast Ohio	1890	8,500	Private Residence	Unknown Architect	43	Wickliffe & Willoughby Hills	28812 Chardon Rd.	Wickliffe Tract 4 section 3
Cobblestone Garth		Squire, Feargus B.(1850-1932) (M-1876; Louisa Christiana Braymaier(1854-1927)	Executive Standard Oil Company and major investor in Steel, Chemical and other Companies Mayor of Wickliffe, Ohio	1900	00000	Demolished	Architect Unknown	6.7	Wickliffe	28787 Ridge Road Winter Residence:1729 Euclid Avenue, later 7809 Euclid Avenue.	Wickliffe Tract 8
Coulallenby NRHP #79001875		Coulby, Harry C. (1865-1929) and Jane Eliza Cottier (M1887-D 1909) and May Allen (– 1921) Owners(1915-1929)	Managed Pickands Mather Group	1915	0000	Wickliffe City Hall	Frederic William Striebinger	54	Wickliffe	28730 Ridge Rd	1915 Atlas Willoughby TWP; T-8 L- 4,6]
Elmhurst	Images from 1903	Talmage, William Clinton(1855-1929) and(m-1886); Leona (Boyce)(1860-1939) Owners (1897-1909)	Standard Sewing Machine Co., Director Cleveland Chamber of Commerce, Owner Talmage Manufacturing Co.	1897	00000-00	Demolished; Now part of Rabbinical College of Telshe.	Architect Unknown	1	Wickliffe	28580 NUTWOOD LN; Winter Residence: 10917 Magnilia Dr. N. E.	1898 Atlas Willoughby TWP; Tract-8 Lots-2
Ridgemere Farm	No available image	Cady, George Washington(-1912) and(M-1964); Amanda L. (Feusier)(-1924) McKinney, Price (1862-1928) and(M1-1888); Julia Parthenia (Linnell)(1864-1902) and(M2-1906); Lucy (Dwyer) Sullivan(1884-1951)	Owner G. W. Cady & Co. and later President Cady-Ivison Co. Receiver for the Corrigan, Ives & Co., Owner CORRIGAN-MCKINNEY STEEL CO. (which later became Republic Steel and then LTV Steel)	C. 1897	00000-00	Demolished. Now part of Rabbinical College of Telshe. and Borromeo Seminary Cleveland	Architect Unknown	28 40	Wickliffe	Nutwood lane 41°35′42″N 81°28′52″W; Cady Winter Residence: 1402 Euclid Ave. McKinney Winter Residence: 10825 East Blvd.(WRHS's Hay-McKinney House)	1898 Atlas Willoughby TWP; Tract-8 Lot-2
Woodbine Croft	No available image	Perkins, Edwin Ruthven(1832-1915) and(M-1858); Harriet (Pelton)(1837-1919)	President of the Board of Education., President Merchant's National Bank, Chairman Cleveland, Tuscarawas Valley & Wheeling Railway Co. Vice-President Cleveland Mining Co. Vice-President of the Cleveland Trust Co. The Western Reserve University's Harriet Pelton Perkins Scholarship named for her.	C.1896	00000-00	Demolished. Now the west bound ramp at Interstate 90 and Euclid Ave.	Architect Unknown	25	Wickliffe	Euclid Ave. C, P & E interurban stop 20. 41.598108°N 81.488753°W Winter Residence: 8011 Euclid Ave.	1898 Atlas Willoughby Twp. Tract 8, Lot 1
Nutwood Farms	Images from 1903	French, Julius E.(1837-1910) and (M-1860); Ezerine B. (Sharp)(1837-1865); Owners(1888-1910) Devereux, Henry Kelsey (1860-1932) and(M-1885); Mildred Abeel French(1862-1945); Owners(1910-1937); Also built Hollywood Plantation Winslow, Lawrence Lanier(1885-1929) and(M-1914); Aileen (Devereux)(1893-1951) owners(1939-1951)	Pennsylvania Oil Prospector, President Chicago-Cleveland Car Roofing Co., President Railway Steel Spring Co. Director on several Mfg. Co. Boards Henry organized the Gentlemen's Driving Club of Cleveland, Managed the Chicago-Cleveland Roofing Co., Director Railway Steel Spring Co. Mildred Inherited a Million Dollar trust and Nutwood farms. Lawrence was a career U.S. Diplomat. In 1913 he became Secretary to the U.S. ambassador to Germany	@1888	00000-00	Demolished @1957, Now Rabbinical College of Telshe.	Landscaped 1912 by Townsend & Fleming (Buffalo, NY)	210 (111 and 99)	Wickliffe & Willoughby Hills	28400 Euclid Ave., C, P & E. Stop 20 French Winter Residence: Euclid Ave later Plaza Hotel New York City; Devereux Winter Residence: 2527 Euclid Ave.	1898 Atlas Tract-8, Lots-2,3 and Track-7 Lot-3; 31A-013OLD2
Hillandale	Images From 1917	Outhwaite, Joseph Husband(1851-1902) and(M-1887-1902); Annette (Boyce)(Outhwaite, Jennings)(1864-1935) Owners(1898-1904) BROWN, Arthur W.(-) and(M1??-1898)(M2-C. 1902); Mrs.(-) owner(1904-1909) Tremaine, Burton Gad(1860-1948) and(M-1891); Maude Edith (Draper)(1869-1910) owner(1909-1925)	Owner J. H. Outhwaite & Co. Brown was President of Cambridge Iron and Steel Co., Belle Valley Coal Company Tremaine founded National Electric Lamp Association, Nela Park	1898; Cost:15-20 Thousand	00000-15	Demolished	Jarvis Hunt	80	Euclid & Wickliffe	27560 Tremaine Dr 41°35′38″N 81°28′56″W; Winter Residence: Outhwaite: Brown: 1885 Euclid Ave. Tremaine: E. 77th	1898 and 1915 Atlas Willoughby Twp. Tract-8, Lot-2,3
Estate	No available image	Owner	Occupations	Year Build	Sq. Ft.	Status	Architect	Acreage	City	Location	Maps

== Historical events and the history of Cleveland (1895–1960) ==
- 1885: John D. Rockefeller and Standard Oil Headquarters move to NYC
- 1895: The C.P & E. Interurban Line extends into Lake Co. (See Interurban Growth.)
- 1910: The Rise of the automobile. By the late 1920s, rubber-tired competition caused the decline of Cleveland-area interurbans, which were dying from lack of ridership. Already the weakest ones had folded, the Cleveland, Youngstown & Eastern abandoned its operations in 1925, and the Cleveland, Painesville & Eastern quit a year later. General Motors streetcar conspiracy
- 1913: The introduction of the Federal income tax
- 1929: Wall Street Crash of 1929
- 1932: Failure of several major Cleveland banks
- The decline of major companies headquartered in Cleveland
- 1959: Interstate 90 in Ohio (I-90) is built through western Lake Co.

When planning Interstate 90, engineers at ODOT District 12 chose to follow the natural ridge line above the east branch of the Chagrin River—the very same scenic high ground once claimed by the region's wealthy estate owners. Sandwiched between the southern watershed of the Chagrin River and the denser cities of Wickliffe, Willoughby, and Mentor, the open fields and pastures through Waite Hill, Kirtland, and Kirtland Hills offered an ideal corridor for the new highway.

- Cleveland in the Gilded Age (A Stroll Down Millionaires Row) Dan Ruminski & Alan Dutka
- Cleveland's Millionaires's Row, Alan F. Dutka
- Habinski, Janice Anthony; Ronald L. Prosek (1988). Mentor: a retrospective. Mentor, Ohio: Old Mentor Foundation.
- Kapsch, Joan; Sue Muehlhauser; Kathie Pohl (1997). Mentor: The First 200 Years. Mentor, Ohio: Mentor Bicentennial Committee/Old Mentor Foundation.
