= Western Reserve Historical Society =

Organization in Cleveland, Ohio

Coordinates: 41°30′48″N 81°36′37″W

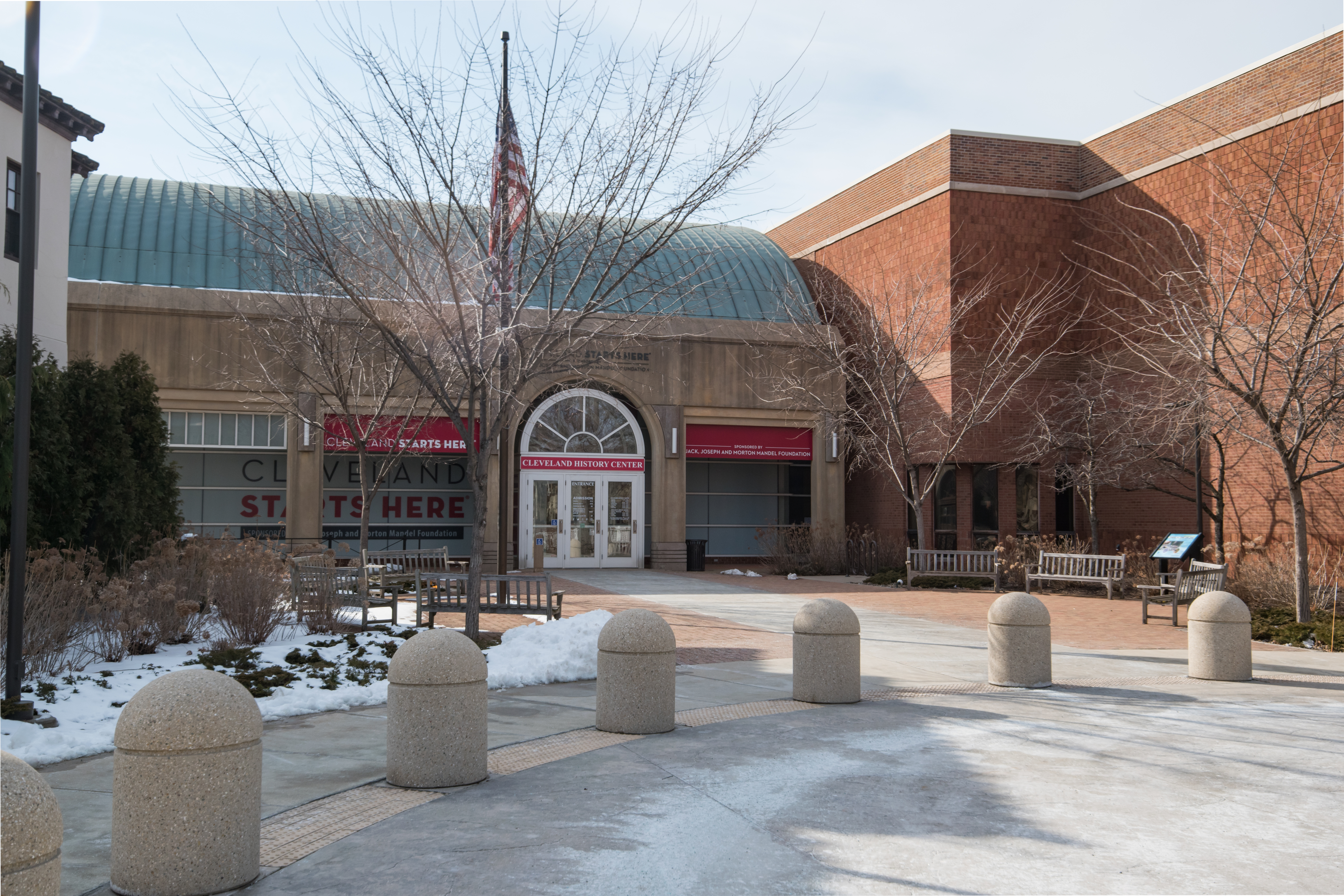
- Entrance to the Cleveland History Center
- Established: 1867
- Location: Cleveland, Ohio, U.S.
- Type: History museum

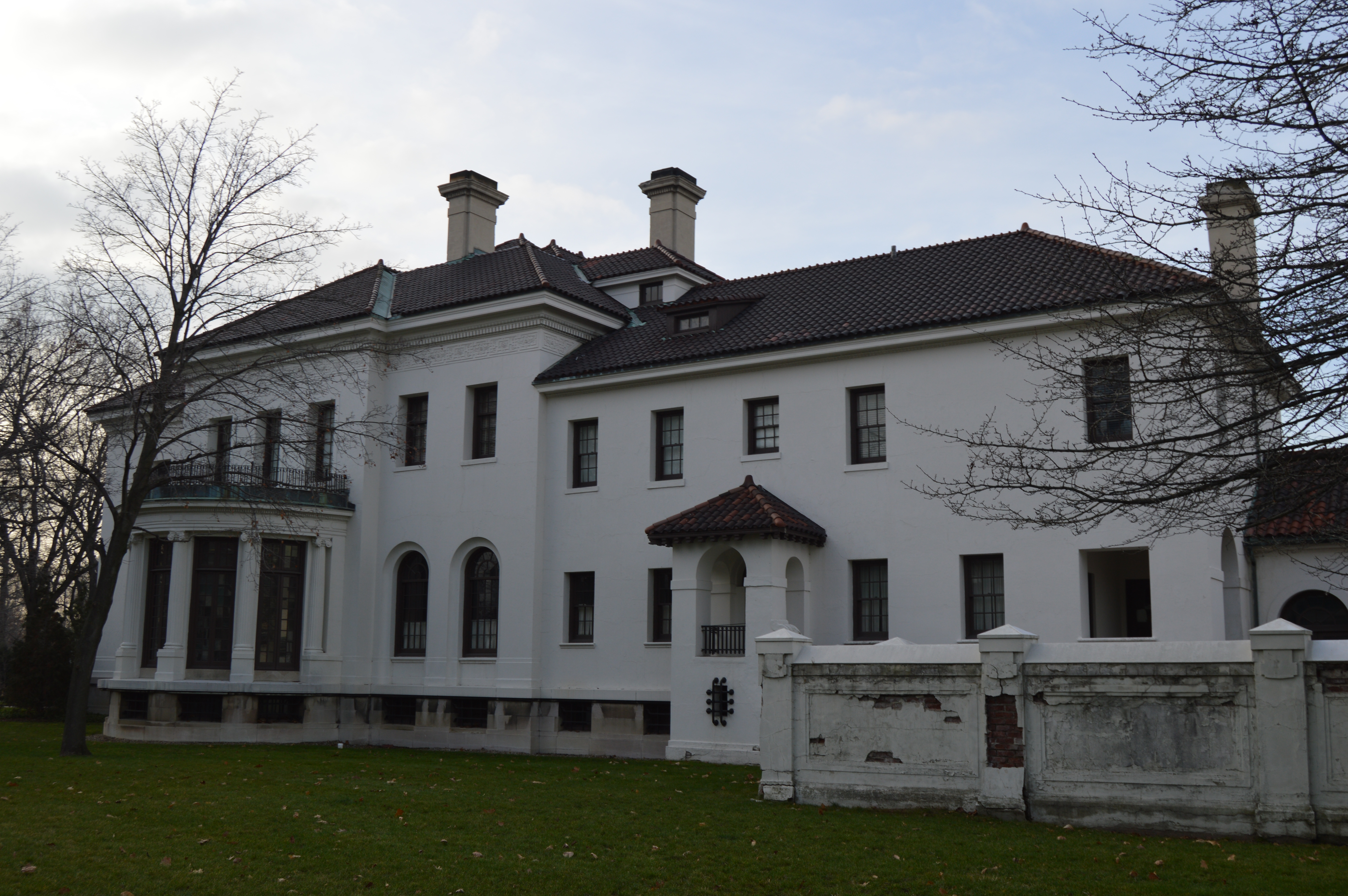
The Hay-McKinney Mansion, part of the Cleveland History Center

The Western Reserve Historical Society (WRHS) is a historical society in Cleveland, Ohio. The society operates the Cleveland History Center, a collection of museums in University Circle.

The society was founded in 1867, making it the oldest cultural institution in Northeast Ohio. WRHS is focused on the history of the Western Reserve. WRHS celebrated its 150th anniversary in 2017.

== Mission ==
Located in University Circle, an arts and culture district of Cleveland, the Society houses and curates collections of cultural artifacts and documents from various people. The mission of the Western Reserve Historical Society is "to inspire people to discover the American experience by exploring the tangible history of Northeast Ohio." This is accomplished by collecting, preserving and presenting the history of all the people of the Western Reserve. WRHS is a private, membership-based society that also receives funding through investments, grants, and gifts.

== History ==
The Western Reserve & Northern Ohio Historical Society formed in 1867, initially as a branch of the Cleveland Library Association, which had been founded in 1848. It sought to record the history of "...Cleveland and the Western Reserve, and generally what relates to the history of Ohio and the Great West," later broadening to Northeast Ohio. Its first president was Charles Whittlesey, "a geologist and historian".

The society was initially located "on the third floor of the Society for Savings Bank in downtown Cleveland". The site is now Key Tower, the site of the KeyBank headquarters. The institution first opened to the public in 1871 and purchased the entire bank building in 1892 due to the increasing size of the collections. That same year, it became an independent organization from the Cleveland Library Association.

From 1898 until 1938 the society resided at E. 107th St. and Euclid Avenue.

WRHS moved to its present location in the late 1930s. In the same period, it acquired the Hay-McKinney mansion, which now hosts the society's museum. Other mid-century acquisitions included the Jonathan Hale homestead in Bath, Ohio in 1957, which now operates as a living history museum.

The 1960s saw a broadening of historical preservation, as the Society began initiatives to record the history of minority populations in Northeast Ohio, including the African-American, Jewish, Italian, Irish, and LGBTQ communities, as well as the local labor movement.

"By the early 1980s, the Western Reserve Historical Society had become one of the largest private historical societies in the United States. In 1986, its library contained approximately 250,000 books and six million manuscript items."

== Cleveland History Center ==
The Society's headquarters in University Circle, styled "the History Center", houses several facilities:

- The Crawford Auto-Aviation Museum houses over 150 vintage and antique automobiles and airplanes.
- The Euclid Beach Park Grand Carousel (PTC #19), originally built in 1910 by the Philadelphia Toboggan Company and fully restored 45 years after the park closed, opened November 23, 2014.
- The History Museum has changing exhibits that showcase local history and also includes:
  - The Hay-McKinney Mansion, a 1911 home with luxurious turn-of-the-century parlors and living areas designed by Abram Garfield, the son of James A. Garfield.
  - The Bingham-Hanna House, built between 1916 and 1919 on the land neighboring the Hay-McKinney property, Harry Payne Bingham built a 35-room house designed by Walker & Gillette, with a landscape by Olmsted Brothers and featuring ironwork by Samuel Yellin.
  - The Chisholm Halle Costume Wing, houses over 30,000 garments from the late 18th century to the present.
- The Library and Archives feature over 20 million archives and manuscripts for genealogical research or any aspect of Northeast Ohio history. The institutions significant collections includes the World's largest and most comprehensive collection of Shaker Materials. Other substantial collections include the Civil War and the automotive industry.

== Hale Farm and Village ==
Located in Bath, Ohio, Hale Farm & Village, a museum of the Western Reserve Historical Society (WRHS) is a "living history museum depicting life in the 19th century through agricultural practices and everyday craft and trade demonstrations such as glassblowing, pottery, spinning and weaving, and more."

Hale Farm's core mission is education, a place where the past is brought to life through a combination of living history experiences, historic architecture, domestic craft and trade demonstrations, farming and heritage gardens.

Hale Farm & Village depicts rural life in the Western Reserve through the experiences of three generations of Hales, from pioneer Jonathan Hale's arrival in 1810 through the bequest of the family farm to WRHS by his great-granddaughter, Clara Belle Ritchie, in 1956. Her will directed WRHS to "establish The Hale Farm as a museum, open to the public to the end that the greatest number of persons may be informed as to the history and culture of the Western Reserve." In 1973, The Hale Farm was listed on the National Register of Historic Places as the Jonathan Hale Homestead.

Located in the heart of the Cuyahoga Valley National Park, Hale Farm & Village is the ultimate outdoor classroom with thirty-two historic structures, heritage breeds of livestock, gardens and crop fields, costumed staff, early American craft and trade demonstrations, and a year-round calendar of educational and public programs and community events that explore the rich, rural American experience in the Western Reserve.

=== Hale Farm structures ===
- Jonathan Hale House (built 1825–1827); the house was one of only two all-brick buildings in the Cuyahoga Valley at the time of its construction.
- Jonathan Goldsmith House (built c. 1830) was built for the William Peck Robinson family in Willoughby, Ohio by Jonathan Gillett Goldsmith (1784–1847)
- Fritch Log Cabin
- Log Smoke House
- Sugar House
- Sawmill
- The John A. McAlonan Carriage Manufactory
- The Stow House
- The Saltbox House
- The Jagger House
- Schoolhouse
- The Land Office
- The Mary Ann Sears Swetland Memorial Meetinghouse
- The Wade Law Office
- The Jonathan E. Herrick House
- The Aten Log Barn

== Other properties ==
- Shandy Hall, located in Geneva, Ohio, was constructed in 1815 by Col. Robert Harper, a son of Alexander Harper, namesake of the township and the first permanent settler in that area. Built in 1815, Shandy Hall is an example of early life and architecture found in the Western Reserve. Shandy Hall is under preservation and is not currently available for public visitation.
- Loghurst, built in 1805 in Canfield, Ohio, is thought to be the oldest residence in the Western Reserve. Loghurst continues to be part of the WRHS Collection of historic buildings and properties. Today, the Canfield Heritage Foundation maintains the property and public operation. Canfield Heritage Foundation offers additional information.
- The society also owned and operated Lawnfield, President James A. Garfield's home in Mentor, Ohio, from 1936, when it was donated by the Garfield family, until 2008, when it was turned over to the National Park Service.

== See also ==
- List of historical societies in Ohio
