= Shandy Hall (Ohio) =

Homestead museum in Harpersfield, Ohio, United States

- U.S. National Register of Historic Places
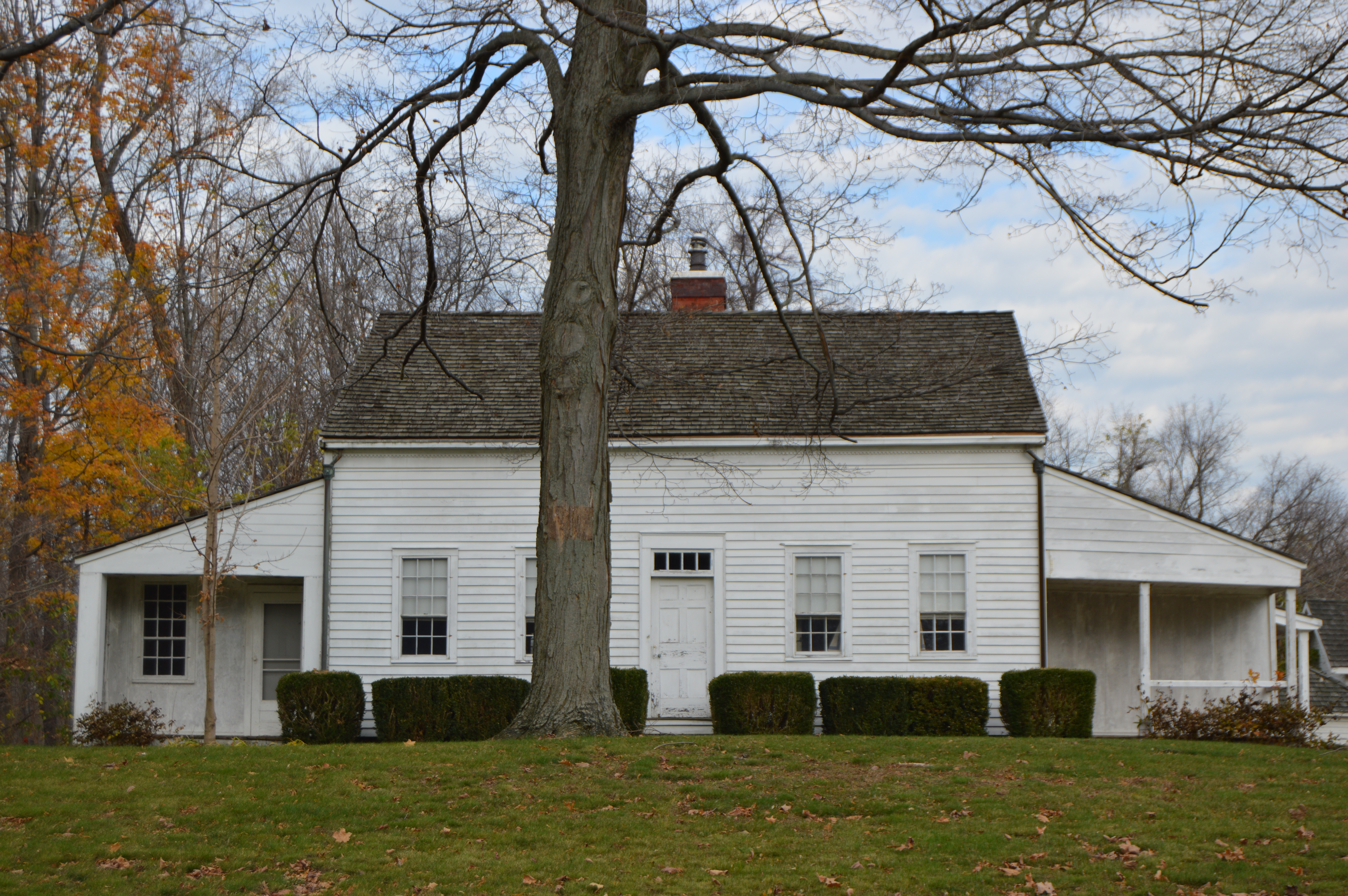
- Roadside view

- Location within Ohio Location within the United States
- Interactive map showing the location of Shandy Hall
- Nearest city: Geneva, Ohio
- Coordinates: 41°46′55″N 80°58′58″W
- Built: 1815
- NRHP reference No.: 74001395
- Added to NRHP: June 28, 1974

Shandy Hall is the name of a homestead museum located in Harpersfield, Ohio, owned and maintained by the Western Reserve Historical Society.

The original rooms of Shandy Hall were built in 1815 by Col. Robert Harper, a son of Alexander Harper, namesake of the township and the first permanent settler in that area. Considered the oldest frame residence in this section of the state, Shandy Hall eventually grew into an 18-room home, practically a mansion by frontier standards. Shandy Hall was named by Robert Harper's daughter, Ann, after her favorite book, Tristram Shandy. Her copy of the book remains at the museum to this day. Shandy Hall, together with many of its original antique furnishings, was donated to the Western Reserve Historical Society in the 1930s. Although a museum, the property does not have regular hours for public visits; tours are by appointment only. The majority of the pieces on display are original to the home.
