= Feargus B. Squire =

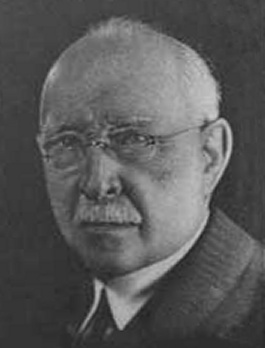
- Born: Feargus O'Conner Bowden Squire; January 12, 1850; Bow, Devon, United Kingdom
- Died: July 21, 1932 (aged 82); Cleveland, Ohio, United States
- Occupation: Petroleum industry executive
- Known for: Inventing the petroleum tank car; constructing Squire's Castle, Cobblestone Garth

Feargus O'Conner Bowden Squire (February 12, 1850 – July 21, 1932), often referred to as F. B. Squire, was an executive with the Standard Oil Company and former mayor of Wickliffe, Ohio. He is well known in the petroleum industry for introducing a number of innovations, such as the tanker truck and door-to-door delivery of refined oil, and for financing a breakthrough in the mining of sulfur.

== Early life and start in the petroleum industry ==
Feargus O'Conner Bowden Squire was born on February 12, 1850, in Bow, Devon, United Kingdom, to John and Mary Ann (née Ellicott) Squire. The family emigrated to the United States in 1860, and took up residence in Cleveland, Ohio. Squire had attended school in England, and continued his education in public school in the United States.

When Squire was 15 years old, he left school to work in a local paper mill, but left soon afterwards to work at the Alexander, Scofield & Company oil refinery. The petroleum refining industry was relatively new, having been founded in Pittsburgh, Pennsylvania, in 1850 by Samuel Kier. The first production oil well was drilled in Pennsylvania in 1859, and by the 1860s crude petroleum was being extensively refined into kerosene for lighting purposes (supplanting whale oil). Alexander, Scofield & Company formed in 1863, and was itself a new business. Continuing his education at night with private tutors, Squire worked his way up from refinery worker to kerosene dealer and then bookkeeper. Alexander, Scofield & Company was one of the four largest petroleum refineries in the Cleveland area, and in 1872 it merged with John D. Rockefeller's Rockefeller, Andrews & Flagler (the precursor to Standard Oil). On April 29, 1872, Squire and fellow bookkeeper John Teagle formed Squire & Teagle, a firm which bought and sold petroleum products. The following year, the two men allowed one of their former employers, William C. Scofield, to purchase an interest in the business. The agreement forming Squire & Teagle ran for only two years, and in 1875 Squire sold his portion of the business to Daniel Shurmer.

Squire was still deeply interested in the retail delivery of refined petroleum, however. He used proceeds from the sale of his business to form Newman, Squire & Company. (Note: His partner in the endeavor was Thomas Newman, who owned a plant in Cleveland that made wooden barrels. Newman's 16-year-old son, Thomas F. Newman, served as the company's assistant bookkeeper in 1875.) The firm developed a horse-drawn oil tanker and formed a subsidiary, the Cleveland Bulk Oil Co. It became the first company in American history to deliver refined petroleum door-to-door to retail customers. Rockefeller told Squire it wouldn't work, as the interior of the tank would rust and ruin the oil. But Squire shipped 10 tank cars, each containing 100 barrels of oil, from Petroleum Center, Pennsylvania, to Detroit, Michigan, and proved him wrong.

== Career with Standard Oil ==
In 1876, Standard Oil bought out Newman, Squire & Co. Squire joined Standard Oil rather than remain on his own, working as an inspector for oil shipments leaving the country at Standard Oil's Weehawken, New Jersey docks. Squire moved to Baltimore, Maryland in 1877, where Standard Oil had purchased eight independent refineries. Squire organized these into the Baltimore United Oil Co. Squire served as an executive officer of Baltimore United Oil until 1879, when he retired for the first time from Standard Oil and returned to live in Cleveland.

Squire rejoined Standard Oil in 1880. The company was making a major effort to dominate the lubricating oil business, and Squire became the company's agent in negotiating the purchase of two key distribution companies based in New York City: Libby, Bartlett & Kimball and Thompson & Bedford. The following year, Squire was made vice president of the Chesebrough Manufacturing Company, which manufactured and sold petroleum jelly under the brand name Vaseline and which had been acquired by Standard Oil in 1880.

Squire was made secretary of Standard Oil in early 1885. In March, just after he had taken up his duties, oil refiner George Rice accused Squire, Standard Oil vice president Frank Rockefeller, and Oklahoma businessman Charles N. Haskell (later the first governor of Oklahoma) of attempting to bribe a clerk in the firm of Scofield, Shurmer & Teagle (Squire's old petroleum company) to learn that company's financial secrets. The men denied the charge, which appeared to have been made irresponsibly, and the court ordered the accusation stricken from the record.

Beginning in February 1887, Squire gradually took on more responsibilities at Standard Oil. John D. Rockefeller moved the company's operational headquarters to New York City, downgrading the Cleveland office to a mere refining and distribution center. Frank Rockefeller, angry at the corporate shift, was increasingly shunted aside by John in favor of Squire, who became much more involved in Standard Oil's decision making structure. One of Squire's roles was to help control subsidiary companies. Rockefeller appointed Squire director of the Buckeye Pipe Line Co. on May 24, 1887 (he served until May 26, 1896), and director of the Solar Refining Co. from its inception on December 6, 1886 (he served until June 13, 1892). By 1892, Squire also owned stock in Standard Oil, although due to the tight control exercised by the Rockefeller family he had only a single share. By 1897, Squire was a trustee of Standard Oil Trust Despite his upper-management role in the company, Squire never felt part of the Rockefeller inner circle.

=== Role in Ohio antitrust suits against Standard Oil ===
Standard Oil originally consisted of 39 companies (some local, others statewide, regional, or national in scope) closely owned by just 37 stockholders. At the time, many state laws prohibited corporations from owning stock in other businesses. How could Standard Oil control its various subsidiaries? The company hit on the idea of establishing a trust. In 1882, the 37 stockholders of Standard Oil signed a secret agreement to establish the Standard Oil Trust. They turned over their stock to the trust, and the trustees began running Standard Oil as a single company.

In 1887, David K. Watson was elected Attorney General of the state of Ohio, and he immediately initiated an antitrust lawsuit against Standard Oil, under the authority of the Sherman Antitrust Act. The case was filed before the Supreme Court of Ohio in May 1890, On March 2, 1892, the Supreme Court of Ohio ruled that the Standard Oil Trust was in violation of the Sherman Antitrust Act, and ordered the trust dissolved. Despite the court's order, the Standard Oil Trust continued to operate as usual (although its trustees were now called "Liquidating Trustees"). (Note: The trustees of the Standard Oil Trust pointed out to the Supreme Court of Ohio that each stockholder had handed over stock to the Trust, and the Trust had handed back a "trust certificate" representing their ownership level in the Trust. Dividends were apportioned based on these trust certificates. Trust certificates had been sold, or divided up; some owners had died. It would take time to determine how much stock each owner was due, and to obtain their legal assent to receive the stock they were owed. The Supreme Court of Ohio agreed. Furthermore, each original stockholder did not get their original stock back: The companies had been managed as a single entity for too long, and their businesses intermingled. Each original stockholder would now receive proportionate share in each of the 37 companies that were part of the Trust. Furthermore, because the companies had grown so much larger in the previous decade, the Liquidating Trustees would hold about $20 million ($716,666,667 in 2025 dollars) in excess stock, which would need to be sold. In fact, the Trust only partially liquidated, and used the forbearance of the Ohio Supreme Court as an excuse to stay in business.)

In November 1897, the new Ohio Attorney General, Frank S. Monnette, sued the Standard Oil Trust for failing to adhere to the Ohio Supreme Court's order of 1892. The impetus for the action came from George Rice, an oil producer, refiner, and pipeline owner in Ohio. Rice owned six shares in the Trust, but nevertheless found his businesses constantly undercut by Standard Oil's predatory pricing and unfair business practices, and the denial of rebates given by railroads to the Standard Oil Trust's companies. When Rice attempted to convert his Trust shares into normal corporate stock, the Trust refused. Monnette convinced the Supreme Court of Ohio to establish a special commissioner, who had the power to subpoena witnesses and documents, take testimony, and issue a report on the status of the Trust's liquidation.

Feargus Squire was considered one of the star witnesses for Standard Oil. He was first placed on the witness stand before the special commissioner in February 1899. The special commission ordered him to turn over all the financial documents, ledgers, and accounting books of the Standard Oil of Ohio (the largest company in the Standard Oil Trust). Squire refused on three grounds: (1) The demand was an unreasonable search and seizure under the Fourth Amendment to the United States Constitution; (2) The books and ledgers could be used to indict the Trust under the laws of Ohio; and (3) Providing the books and ledgers would amount to self-incrimination, violating the Fifth Amendment's prohibition on self-incrimination. Squire was threatened with contempt of court, but Monnette backed down in favor of continuing with the proceedings. Squire became further involved in the lawsuit in a dispute about unfair business practices. George Rice had accused the Trust of attempting to drive him out of business by purchasing and then closing his refinery; when he refused to sell, Rice said, Standard Oil let it be known that Rice's refinery was worth only $25,000 (much less than Rice had claimed). In testimony before the special commissioner, Rice said that Feargus Squire had offered him $250,000 for his refinery, belying the later claim. Squire was not called to dispute the charge.

Squire was then accused of attempted bribery. In December 1899, Monnette claimed that, in the original case against Standard Oil, Squire, Haskell, and Frank Rockefeller had offered Attorney General Watson a $500,000 bribe to cease all litigation against the trust. Monnette's claims were widely reported. But the Ohio Supreme Court declined to order an investigation of the charges because there was no evidence that any such bribe had been offered. The court dismissed the charge, and Monnette left office at the end of 1899 after declining to run for reelection.

Monnette's successor, John M. Sheets, dismissed the state of Ohio's antitrust suits against the Standard Oil Trust.

=== Role in federal antitrust suit against Standard Oil ===
Squire's role in the suit against the Standard Oil Trust came to a close during the federal government's case against the trust, which led to the trust's breakup in 1911. In November 1906, the United States Department of Justice brought suit under the Sherman Antitrust Act against the Standard Oil Trust, accusing it of unfair monopolistic business practices. The suit also indicated all 65 companies overseen by the trust, and individuals personally such as John D. Rockefeller and his brother, William Rockefeller. The accusations included forcing railroads to deny rebates to other refiners, operating wholly owned subsidiaries as if they were independent companies, predatory pricing, bribery, intimidation, and industrial espionage. Federal prosecutor Frank B. Kellogg took a deposition from Squire in Cleveland in the summer of 1908. Squire was then called to the witness stand in Missouri (Note: The case was being tried by a four-judge panel of the United States District Court for the Eastern District of Missouri. Beginning June 24, 1907, documents were subpoenaed and testimony in the case was heard by the court's special master, Judge Franklin Ferriss. Judge Ferriss issued his report on March 22, 1909. The four-judge panel heard additional testimony April 5 to 10, 1909.) in September 1908. Before court's special master, Squire testified that, to his knowledge, no bribes had ever been offered or paid by Standard Oil or its subsidiaries. He also angrily denounced any claims that Standard Oil had bribed state oil inspectors to spy on independent oil distribution companies. But in damaging testimony, Squire admitted that Standard Oil had purchased the independent New American Oil Company (Mansfield, Ohio) and Toledo Oil Company (Toledo, Ohio) and declined to disclose the fact for more than four years. These companies, and others which Standard Oil bought out, delivered refined oil in wooden barrels. Standard Oil delivered refined oil in metal tank cars, and wanted to drive the "barrel oil" companies out of business. Squire claimed that Standard Oil had "not advertised" the fact of its ownership in order to retain the goodwill these companies had. Once more, Squire was one of the star witnesses during the trial, and Kellogg subjected him to the most intense cross-examination for any witness thus far.

The federal district court ruled on November 20, 1909, that the Standard Oil Trust was in clear violation of the Sherman Antitrust Act. The Supreme Court of the United States upheld the district court's ruling on May 15, 1911.

== Other business roles and investments ==
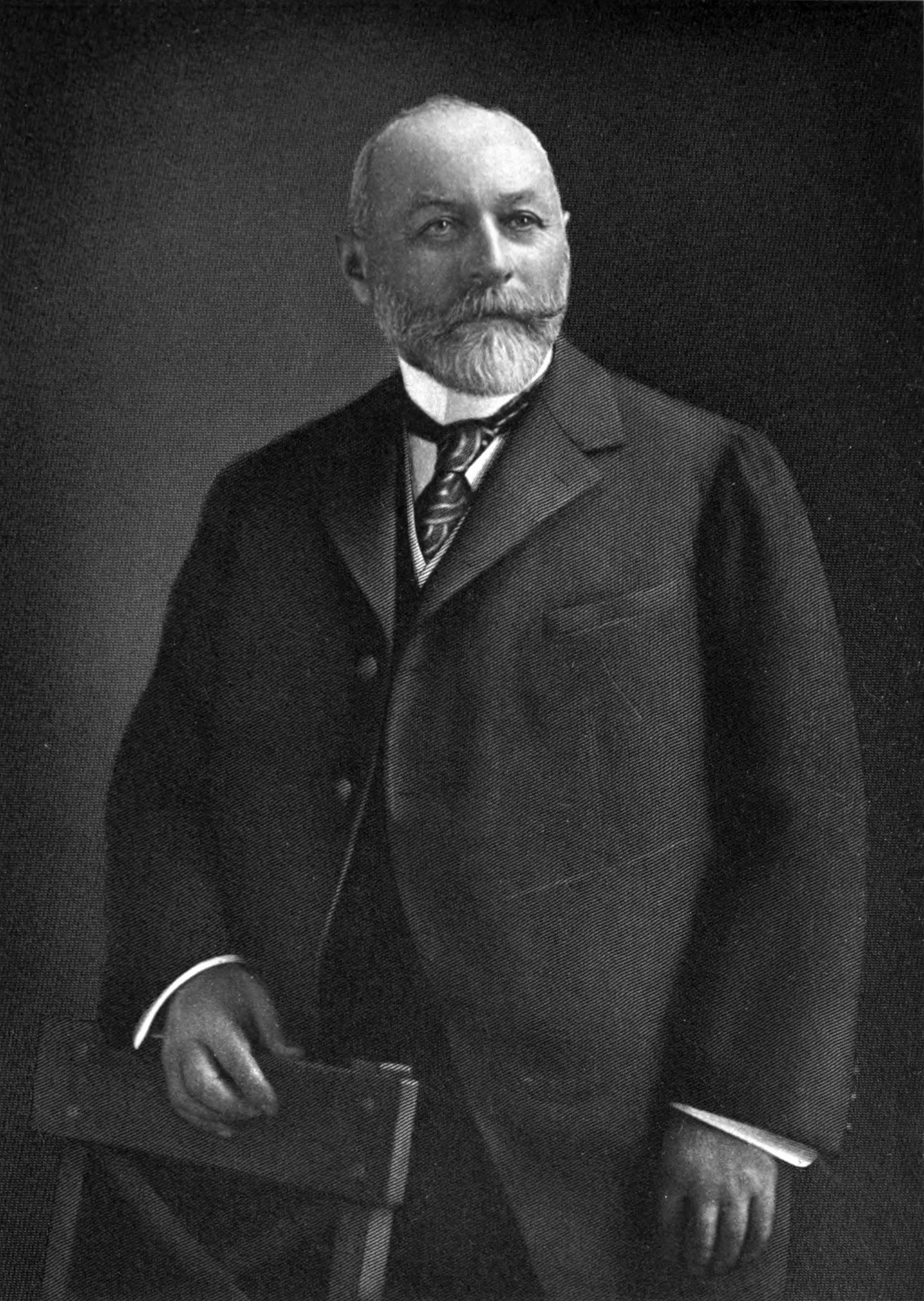
Herman Frasch in 1918. Squire funded his sulfur mining efforts, a landmark in the history of sulfur production.

=== Association with Herman Frasch ===
As Squire's wealth grew, and he made business connections through his Standard Oil work, he began to develop a wide range of other business interests. Chemical engineer Herman Frasch was hard at work on a process to remove sulfur from sour crude oil. Solar Refining Co. was founded to utilize the process Frasch developed, which led to Squire's directorship with Solar. Frasch became Standard Oil's first director of research and development in 1888. Frasch next began work on a process to cheaply manufacture soda ash. The petroleum industry consumed large amounts of soda ash, which was used to decalcify drilling fluids. In 1892, Frasch established the Frasch Process Soda Company, with Squire as vice president. Salt was a major component of soda ash production, and in 1882 and 1883 Frash had secured patents on new methods to crystallize and grain salt from a brine solution. Frasch, Frank Rockefeller, and Squire formed the United Salt Company in 1892 as well, but a bad fire in 1894 and financial losses led to the sale of the firm to the National Salt Company in 1899. He became a director of National Salt in 1900.

Frasch also patented a major new process for mining sulfur in 1890. The Frasch Process, which involves heating and melting the sulfur below-ground so it can be pumped to the surface, was a landmark in sulfur mining technology. Squire and Rockefeller invested heavily in the process, and in exchange received 30 percent of the profits generated by the patent's licensing. The Union Sulphur Company was incorporated in 1896. But Squire sold his share in the company to Frasch in 1899, missing out on Union Sulfur's explosive growth in 1903.

=== Other investments and roles ===
For a time, Squire also dabbled in newspaper publishing. In 1890, he was one of the principal financial backers of the new Cleveland Daily World newspaper, and served as the paper's president. In 1895, the other two major investors, B. F. Bower and George H. Robertson, sold their interest in the Daily World to Robert P. Porter, former owner of the New York Press. Squire sold enough of his shares to Porter to give Porter control of the Daily World.

Squire became director of a wide range of companies, including the Ohio Surety Co. in 1894, the Standard Telegraph & Telephone Co. (with Frank Rockefeller and Louis Severance), the Electrograph Company of America in 1901, and, in the 1910s, the Maynard H. Murch Co. (a Cleveland-based brokerage firm) and the McGraw Tire & Rubber Company.

=== Steel ===
Squire also became an investor in the Cleveland steel industry. In October 1899, Squire invested in the Metal Sales Company, maker of steel for the manufacture of streetcars. In 1901, he helped finance and incorporate the Semi-Steel Co. of Chagrin Falls, Ohio, which manufactured streetcar equipment, brakes, and small steel castings. His involvement in the burgeoning Cleveland steel industry led the Jenks Ship Building Company to name a steel bulk freighter, launched in 1903, the F.B. Squire in honor of Squire. The M. A. Hanna Company purchased the F.B. Squire in December 1915. In 1892, Squire was appointed secretary of the Cleveland Steel Castings Co. He maintained his interest in steel manufacture into the 1920s, becoming secretary and treasurer of the Carroll Foundry and Machine Co. of Bucyrus, Ohio, in 1922.

== Retirement ==
On November 12, 1908, Feargus Squire announced that he was retiring from Standard Oil, effective January 1, 1909. He claimed exhaustion as his rationale. (Note: He had long complained about the excessive competitiveness, in-fighting, and unpleasantness of the people in upper management, and may have soured on the company.) His son, Reginald, who was also employed by Standard Oil, resigned at the same time. (He joined the Lubric Company, manufacturer of lubricating oils and greases.) Feargus Squire and his wife, Louisa, spent 1909 and 1910 touring Europe, the Middle East, China, Japan, Micronesia, Polynesia, and Melanesia.

In 1923, Squire served a single, one-year term as Mayor of Wickliffe.

=== Homes ===
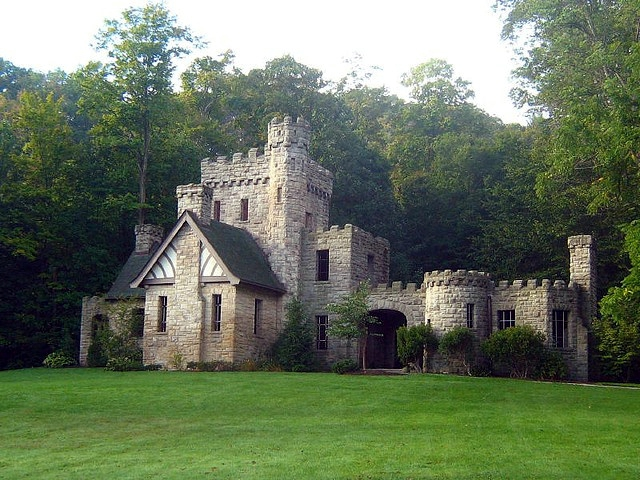
"Squire's Castle", built about 1897 by Feargus B. Squire.

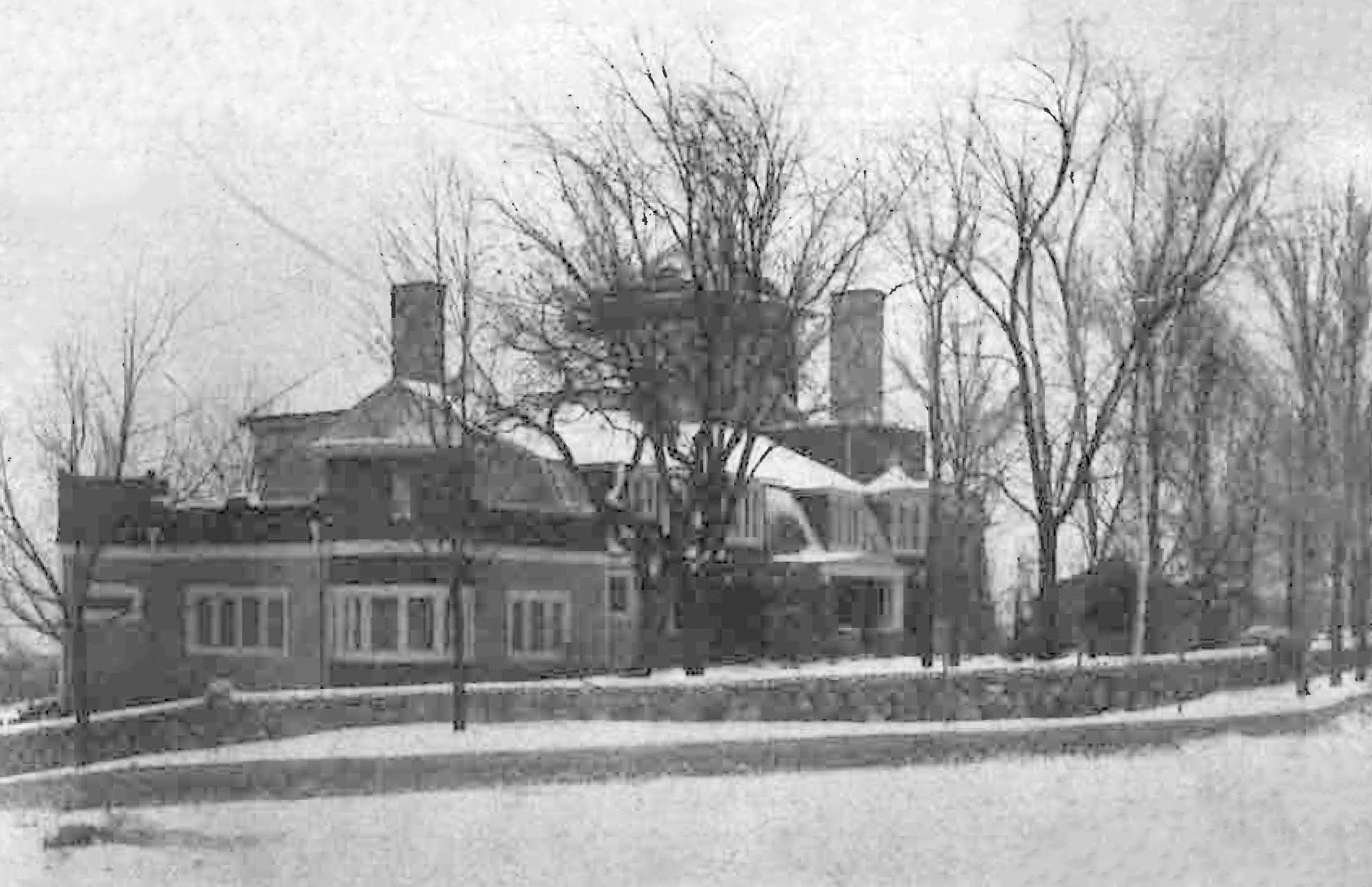
Looking northeast at Cobblestone Garth in 1904.

Squire's earliest known residence was at 1729 Euclid Avenue in Cleveland. This was his primary residence, and Euclid Avenue was known as "Millionaire's Row" due to the large number of mansions built there by wealthy men. In 1905, Squire moved to 7809 Euclid Avenue. This home was built in 1875 by Liberty E. Holden, a real estate investor and owner of The Plain Dealer newspaper.

About 1890, Squire purchased 525 acres (2.12 km^{2}) of forest land near what is now Willoughby Hills, Ohio, east of Cleveland. He called it River Farm Estate, and planned to turn it into an English country estate complete with manor house. About 1895, Squire began construction on a gatekeeper's house in the Romanesque Revival style. The structure, which was exceedingly rustic (lacking running water, electricity, natural gas, or sewer) was completed about 1897. Squire abandoned plans for a manor house after encountering difficulty obtaining building materials and labor. Squire and his daughter used the gatekeeper's house as an occasional weekend country home (even spending most of the summer of 1903 there). But Squire's wife disliked the house, and Squire rarely visited it after 1908. He sold the estate and gatekeeper's house to developers in 1922. After the developers went bankrupt, the estate was seized by a local bank. The Cleveland Park Board (precursor to Cleveland Metroparks) purchased most of the land from the bank in 1925. The park board began calling the structure "Squire's Castle". Heavily vandalized over the years, the structure has been somewhat restored and is open to the public.

About 1900 or 1901, Squire began construction on a second country home, Cobblestone Garth, in Wickliffe, Ohio. It was not unusual for wealthy men to own more than one country home at the time, but Cobblestone Garth was quite different from the unbuilt River Farm Estate: Built in the then-current Victorian architectural style, it was built primarily of wood, was much larger, and had most modern conveniences. Cobblestone Garth was largely complete by 1902, and featured in the book The Country Estates of Cleveland Men in 1903. After the Squires' return to the United States in late 1910, they moved permanently to Cobblestone Garth from Euclid Avenue. Although Cobblestone Garth itself was torn down at a later date, the rubble masonry border wall, gatehouse, and a distinctive lighthouse-like structure remained intact into the 21st century. It is located at 28787 Ridge Road in Wickliffe.

=== Personal life and death ===
Squire was a Baptist by religion, and a Freemason.

On December 26, 1876, he married Louisa Christiana Braymaier of Cleveland. The couple had two children: Reginald Rockefeller (born 1882) (Note: Reginald died at the age of 55 on January 23, 1938, in Cleveland.) and Irma Lissette (born 1884). (Note: Irma's husband, John Franklin Rust, died December 28, 1938, in Cleveland Heights, Ohio. Born June 16, 1882, he was an officer in the Citizens Savings & Loan Co. The couple had no children. Irma died at her home in Shaker Heights, Ohio, on April 1, 1982, at the age of 97.) Louisa died on October 29, 1927, at Cobblestone Garth of pneumonia.

Feargus Squire fell ill with an undisclosed illness in 1931. He died at his home at 2533 Fairmount Boulevard in Cleveland Heights, Ohio, on July 21, 1932. He was buried in the mausoleum at Knollwood Cemetery in Mayfield Heights, Ohio. His wife, daughter, and son-in-law are all buried in the same room.

== Bibliography ==
- Avery, Elroy McKendree (1918). A History of Cleveland and Its Environs. Chicago: Lewis Publishing Co. p. 425. "Cleveland Bulk Oil."
- Biographical Cyclopaedia and Portrait Gallery With an Historical Sketch of the State of Ohio. Vol. 4. Cincinnati: Western Biographical Publishing Company. 1887.
- Cavalier, Julian (1973). American Castles. South Brunswick, N.J.: A.S. Barnes. ISBN 9780498012549.
- Chernow, Ron (2010). Titan: The Life of John D. Rockefeller, Sr. New York: Vintage Books. ISBN 9780307429773.
- Cleveland Directory Co. (1902). The Cleveland City Directory. Cleveland: Cleveland Directory Co.
- Derby, George, ed. (1935). The National Cyclopædia of American Biography. Vol. 24. New York: J.T. White & Company. hdl:2027/mdp.39015078229120.
- Flynn, John T. (1933). God's Gold: The Story of Rockefeller and His Times. Rahway, N.J.: G.G. Harrap & Co. ISBN 9781610164115.
- Greenwood, John Orville (1990). The Mack, Becker, Jenkins, England, Seither, and Midland Fleets. Cleveland: Freshwater Press. ISBN 9780912514536.
- Gupta, Ram B.; Demirbas, Ayhan (2010). Gasoline, Diesel, and Ethanol Biofuels From Grasses and Plants. New York: Cambridge University Press. ISBN 9780521763998.
- Hartman, Jan Cigliano (1991). Showplace of America: Cleveland's Euclid Avenue, 1850–1910. Kent, Ohio: Kent State University Press. ISBN 9780873384452.
- Hildy, Ralph W.; Hildy, Muriel E. (1955). History of Standard Oil Company (New Jersey): Volume 1, Pioneering in Big Business, 1882–1911. New York: Harper.
- Hilton, George W. (1995). Eastland: Legacy of the 'Titanic'. Stanford, Calif.: Stanford University Press. ISBN 9780804722919.
- The Insurance Year Book. New York: The Spectator Company. 1895.
- Josephson, Matthew (1995) [1934]. The Robber Barons: The Great American Capitalists, 1861–1901. New York: Harcourt, Brace & World. ISBN 9780156767903.
- Kip, Frederic Ellsworth; Hawley, Margarita Lansing (1928). History of the Kip Family in America. Boston: Hudson Printing Co.
- Kraus, Jeffrey (2012). "Standard Oil Co. of New Jersey v. United States". In Miller, Wilbur R. (ed.). The Social History of Crime and Punishment in America: An Encyclopedia. Volume 4. London: Sage Publications. ISBN 9781412988766.
- Kutney, Gerald (2007). Sulfur: History, Technology, Applications and Industry. Toronto: ChemTec Publishing. ISBN 9781895198379.
- Lyons, William C.; Plisga, Gary S. (2005). Standard Handbook of Petroleum and Natural Gas Engineering. Burlington, Mass.: Elsevier/Gulf Professional Publishing. ISBN 9781417549733.
- Manns, Leslie D. (1998). "Dominance in the Oil Industry: Standard Oil from 1865 to 1911". In Rosenbaum, David Ira (ed.). Market Dominance: How Firms Gain, Hold, or Lose It and the Impact on Economic Performance. Westort, Conn.: Praeger. ISBN 9780275956042.
- Memorial Record of the County of Cuyahoga and City of Cleveland, Ohio. Chicago: Lewis Publishing Co. 1894. p. 138. "Alexander Scofield & Co.."
- Moody's Manual of Industrial and Miscellaneous Securities. New York: O.C. Lewis Co. 1900.
- Moody's Manual of Railroad and Corporation Securities. New York: Poor's Publishing Co. 1906.
- Nevins, Allan (1940). John D. Rockefeller: The Heroic Age of American Enterprise. New York: C. Scribner's Sons.
- Ohio Secretary of State (1931). Ohio Roster of Municipal and Township Officers and Members of Boards of Education. Columbus, Ohio: F.J. Heer Printing Co.
- Olien, Roger M.; Olien, Diana D. (2000). Oil and Ideology: The Cultural Creation of the American Petroleum Industry. Chapel Hill, N.C.: University of North Carolina Press. ISBN 9780807825235.
- Orth, Samuel Peter (1910). A history of Cleveland, Ohio. Vol. 2. Chicago: S.J. Clarke Publishing Co.
- Rister, Carl Coke (1957). Oil! Titan of the Southwest. Norman, Okla.: University of Oklahoma Press.
- Roy, William G. (1997). Socializing Capital: The Rise of the Large Industrial Corporation in America. Princeton, N.J.: Princeton University Press. ISBN 9781400813247.
- Sheldon, Harrison T., ed. (1913). History of the Class of 1905. Volume 3. New Haven, Conn.: Yale University.
- 'Standard Oil Company et al., appellants vs. the United States'. Transcript of Record. Vol. 22. Supreme Court of the United States. October term, 1909. No. 725. Washington, D.C.: Judd & Detwiler. January 17, 1910.
- Tarbell, Ida M. (1966). The History of the Standard Oil Company. New York: Harper & Row. ISBN 9781605207605.
- Walker, David A. (2001). "Busting Trusts With More Backbone Than a Banana: 'Northern Securities Company v. U.S.' (1904) and 'Standard Oil Company of New Jersey, et al. v. U.S.' (1911)". In Johnson, John W. (ed.). Historic U.S. Court Cases: An Encyclopedia. New York: Routledge. ISBN 9780415930192.
- Wall, Bennett H.; Gibb, George Sweet (1974). Teagle of Jersey Standard. New Orleans: Tulane University Press.
