= Tim Misny =

American attorney

- Born: Timothy Paul Misny; April 22, 1955 (age 71); Euclid, Ohio, U.S.
- Education: John Carroll University (pre-law); Cleveland–Marshall College of Law (J.D.)
- Occupation: Personal injury lawyer
- Political party: Democratic
- Spouse: Stephanie Paulitsch (m. 2007)
- Children: 3
- Website: https://misnylaw.com/

Timothy Paul Misny is an American personal injury lawyer who specializes in birth injury, medical malpractice, pharmaceutical class action lawsuits, catastrophic injury and wrongful death. Misny has been practicing law in Greater Cleveland, Ohio, U.S., since the 1980s and is known for his unusual advertising campaigns.

== Early life and career ==
Misny was born in the Cleveland suburb of Euclid on April 22, 1955. He is a third generation Slovak American. His paternal grandfather, Janos Mizanyin, changed his surname to Misny after immigrating to the United States from Slovakia (at the time, part of Austria-Hungary). Misny's maternal grandfather, Joseph Vulich, was a Croatian immigrant construction worker who died when scaffolding collapsed during the construction of Terminal Tower in Cleveland in the late 1920s.

Misny has told interviewers that when he was seven years old, his maternal grandmother, Vernica Vulich, took him to downtown Cleveland to see the Tower City Center. When he asked who lived in the building, she told him lawyers rented offices in the building, and that through hard study he would also one day be a lawyer. On his website, Misny cites his family history as inspiration for his work as a personal injury lawyer.

In his childhood, Misny attended St. Paul Elementary School and graduated from St. Joseph High School in 1973. He received his undergraduate degree in pre-law from John Carroll University in 1977, and earned his J.D. degree from Cleveland–Marshall College of Law in 1981.

Misny served as an assistant police prosecutor and as an attorney of the Cleveland Police Patrolmen's Association before becoming a plaintiff personal injury lawyer. He represents clients from across the United States.

Due to his billboards featuring his raised-eyebrow gesture; his television commercials and billboards carrying his trademarked phrase "I'll Make Them Pay", which was inspired by a client's relative; and his weekly television show on Cleveland CBS affiliate WOIO, Misny has become a local celebrity.

A mockumentary about Misny and his career was due to be released in 2025, but as of September 2025 it was on indefinite hold due to creative differences.

== Personal life ==
Timothy Misny and his wife Stephanie were married in Rome, Italy, on June 23, 2007. Their firstborn son Maximilian Aldrovandi Misny was born on December 13, 2009. Twins Gus and Ruby followed; they were 11 years old in early 2025. As of 2025 the family lives at their 55-acre woodland estate, "Misnyland," in the Cleveland suburb of Waite Hill. Misny also supports and helps raise funds for the Cleveland City Mission.
