= Willoughby Hills, Ohio =

- City
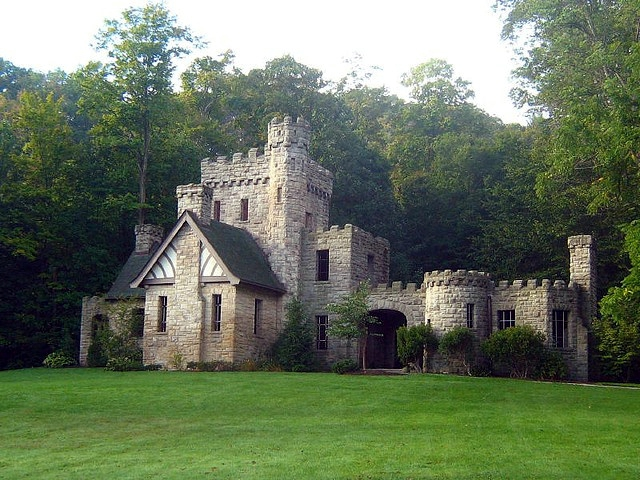
- Squire's Castle
- Nickname: The Bridge City
- Motto: "Where the City Meets the Country"
- Location of Willoughby Hills in Greater Cleveland

- Location within Ohio Location within the United States
- Coordinates: 41°35′14″N 81°26′00″W
- Country: United States
- State: Ohio
- County: Lake
- Founded: 1815
- Incorporated: 1954

Government
  - Mayor: Chris Hallum (R)

Area
  - Total: 10.85 sq mi (28.09 km^{2})
  - Land: 10.76 sq mi (27.87 km^{2})
  - Water: 0.081 sq mi (0.21 km^{2})
- Elevation: 801 ft (244 m)

Population (2020)
  - Total: 10,019
  - Density: 931.0/sq mi (359.46/km^{2})
- Time zone: UTC-5 (EST)
  - Summer (DST): UTC-4 (EDT)
- ZIP code: 44092 and 44094
- Area code: 440
- FIPS code: 39-85512
- GNIS feature ID: 1086436
- Website: www.willoughbyhills-oh.gov

Willoughby Hills is a city in Lake County, Ohio, United States, along the Chagrin River. The population was 10,019 at the 2020 census. A suburb of Cleveland, it is part of the Cleveland metropolitan area.

== Geography ==
According to the United States Census Bureau, the city has a total area of 10.82 square miles (28.02 km^{2}), of which 10.73 square miles (27.79 km^{2}) is land and 0.09 square miles (0.23 km^{2}) is water. Willoughby Hills borders Euclid and Richmond Heights on the west, Gates Mills, Highland Heights, and Mayfield Village on the south, Kirtland and Waite Hill on the east, and Wickliffe and Willoughby to the north.

== Demographics ==
Historical population
Census	Pop.	Note	%±
1960	4,241		—
1970	5,969		40.7%
1980	8,612		44.3%
1990	8,427		−2.1%
2000	8,595		2.0%
2010	9,485		10.4%
2020	10,019		5.6%
2025 (est.)	9,992		−0.3%

88.3% spoke English, 3.7% Slovene, 3.1% Croatian, 1.1% Spanish, 1.1% Italian, and 1.1% Russian.

Of the city's population over the age of 25, 35.5% held a bachelor's degree or higher.

=== Racial and ethnic composition ===
Racial composition as of the 2020 census
Race	Number	Percent
White	6,725	67.1%
Black or African American	2,239	22.3%
American Indian and Alaska Native	15	0.1%
Asian	543	5.4%
Native Hawaiian and Other Pacific Islander	2	0.0%
Some other race	40	0.4%
Two or more races	455	4.5%
Hispanic or Latino (of any race)	189	1.9%

=== 2020 census ===
As of the 2020 census, Willoughby Hills had a population of 10,019. The median age was 45.0 years, with 16.3% of residents under the age of 18 and 22.8% of residents 65 years of age or older.

For every 100 females there were 89.8 males, and for every 100 females age 18 and over there were 87.6 males age 18 and over.

There were 4,846 households in Willoughby Hills, of which 20.2% had children under the age of 18 living in them. Of all households, 38.9% were married-couple households, 22.0% were households with a male householder and no spouse or partner present, and 33.4% were households with a female householder and no spouse or partner present. About 39.1% of all households were made up of individuals and 14.9% had someone living alone who was 65 years of age or older.

There were 5,134 housing units, of which 5.6% were vacant. The homeowner vacancy rate was 1.0% and the rental vacancy rate was 6.3%.

94.9% of residents lived in urban areas, while 5.1% lived in rural areas.

=== 2010 census ===
As of the census of 2010, there were 9,485 people, 4,398 households, and 2,602 families living in the city. The population density was 884.0 inhabitants per square mile (341.3/km^{2}). There were 4,929 housing units at an average density of 459.4 per square mile (177.4/km^{2}). The racial makeup of the city was 77.6% White, 16.1% African American, 4.3% Asian, 0.3% from other races, and 1.6% from two or more races. Hispanic or Latino of any race were 1.3% of the population.

There were 4,398 households, of which 23.0% had children under the age of 18 living with them, 44.6% were married couples living together, 10.4% had a female householder with no husband present, 4.1% had a male householder with no wife present, and 40.8% were non-families. 35.6% of all households were made up of individuals, and 10.8% had someone living alone who was 65 years of age or older. The average household size was 2.16 and the average family size was 2.80.

The median age in the city was 44.4 years. 18.6% of residents were under the age of 18; 8.2% were between the ages of 18 and 24; 24% were from 25 to 44; 31.1% were from 45 to 64; and 18.1% were 65 years of age or older. The gender makeup of the city was 48.1% male and 51.9% female.

=== 2000 census ===
As of the census of 2000, there were 8,595 people, 3,973 households, and 2,379 families living in the city. The population density was 798.4 inhabitants per square mile (308.3/km^{2}). There were 4,292 housing units at an average density of 398.7 per square mile (153.9/km^{2}). The racial makeup of the city was 88.84% White, 6.47% African American, 0.07% Native American, 3.55% Asian, 0.15% from other races, and 0.92% from two or more races. Hispanic or Latino of any race were 0.70% of the population. 15.5% were of German, 15.3% Italian, 11.1% Slovene, 8.8% Irish and 7.3% English ancestry according to Census 2000.

There were 3,973 households, out of which 20.9% had children under the age of 18 living with them, 49.2% were married couples living together, 7.4% had a female householder with no husband present, and 40.1% were non-families. 35.1% of all households were made up of individuals, and 11.5% had someone living alone who was 65 years of age or older. The average household size was 2.16 and the average family size was 2.82.

In the city the population was spread out, with 18.1% under the age of 18, 7.1% from 18 to 24, 28.4% from 25 to 44, 27.9% from 45 to 64, and 18.4% who were 65 years of age or older. The median age was 43 years. For every 100 females, there were 91.5 males. For every 100 females age 18 and over, there were 90.0 males.

The median income for a household in the city was $47,493, and the median income for a family was $60,397. Males had a median income of $47,190 versus $30,908 for females. The per capita income for the city was $26,688. About 1.7% of families and 3.4% of the population were below the poverty line, including 2.7% of those under age 18 and 2.7% of those age 65 or over.

== Government ==
Willoughby Hills has a mayor-council system of government. As of 2024, the mayor is Chris Hallum, a Republican. The City Council consists of seven members, who are elected for four-year terms. Four members are elected by the city at-large, and three members are elected from districts. As of 2024, the members of the City Council are as follows:

Willoughby Hills City Council
Seat	Name	Party
Council-at-Large 1	Julie A. Belich	Republican
Council-at-Large 2	Joseph Jarmuszkiewicz	Republican
Council-at-Large 3	Daniel L. Knecht	Unaffiliated
Council-at-Large 4	Vicki Miller	Republican
District 1	Mike Kline	Unaffiliated
District 2	Tanya Taylor Draper	Democrat
District 3	Kathleen Sivo	Unaffiliated

== Culture ==
Two notable buildings in Willoughby Hills are the Squire's Castle in the Cleveland Metroparks' North Chagrin Reservation and the Louis Penfield House, a house designed by Frank Lloyd Wright.

== Education ==
The city is served by the Willoughby-Eastlake City School District.

Willoughby Hills has a public library, a branch of Willoughby-Eastlake Public Library.
