= African Americans in Ohio =

Ethnic group in Ohio

Total population
- 1.443 million (2020)

Regions with significant populations
- Christianity

Ohio was a destination for escaped African Americans slaves before the Civil War. In the early 1870s, the Society of Friends members actively helped former black slaves in their search of freedom. The state was important in the operation of the Underground Railroad. While a few escaped enslaved blacks passed through the state on the way to Canada, a large population of blacks settled in Ohio, especially in big cities like Cleveland and Cincinnati. By 1860, around 37,000 blacks lived in the state.

== Population ==
In the 2020 Census, 1,478,781 Ohio residents were identified as African American (of the total 11,799,448). In 4 of the state's 88 counties, African Americans make up more than 20% of the population: Cuyahoga (29.3%), Hamilton (25.2%), Franklin (22.6%), and Montgomery (21.2%). African Americans in the seven counties of Cuyahoga (370,895), Franklin (299,771), Hamilton (209,173), Montgomery (113,728), Lucas (85,081), Summit (79,726), and Mahoning (34,835) make up more than 80% of all African Americans in the state.

== See also ==
- List of African American newspapers in Ohio
