= Squire's Castle =

Vacant building in Northeast Ohio, US

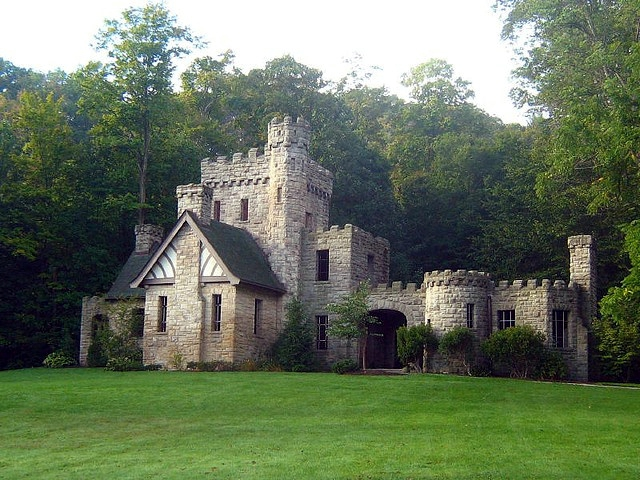
- Squire's Castle in 2008
- Interactive map of the Squire's Castle area

General information
- Location: 2844 River Road; Willoughby Hills, Ohio
- Coordinates: 41°34′48″N 81°25′9″W
- Construction started: 1895
- Completed: 1897

Squire's Castle is the remaining shell of a building now operated by the Cleveland Metroparks as part of the North Chagrin Reservation in Willoughby Hills, Ohio.

== Construction of the building ==
Feargus B. Squire was a Standard Oil Company executive and former mayor of Wickliffe, Ohio. His earliest known residence was at 1729 Euclid Avenue in Cleveland. In 1905, Squire moved to 7809 Euclid Avenue. Squire completed work in 1902 on Cobblestone Garth, a Victorian mansion located in Wickliffe, Ohio. The Squires moved from their Euclid Avenue home into Cobblestone Garth in 1910.

About 1890, Squire purchased 525 acres (2.12 km^{2}) of forest land near what is now Willoughby Hills, Ohio, east of Cleveland. He called it River Farm Estate, and planned to turn it into an English country estate complete with manor house. About 1895, Squire began construction on a gatekeeper's house in the Romanesque Revival style. The rustic structure (lacking electricity, natural gas, running water, or sewer) was completed about 1897.

The outer walls are of locally-quarried Euclid bluestone, a form of bluish-colored sandstone found throughout the greater Cleveland area. The structure originally had a ground floor, two upper floors, and a basement. Its windows were of leaded glass.

== Use of the structure ==
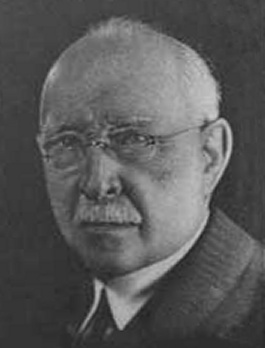
Feargus B. Squire

Squire abandoned plans for a manor house after encountering difficulty obtaining building materials and labor. Squire and his daughter used the gatekeeper's house as an occasional weekend country home (even spending most of the summer of 1903 there). But Squire's wife disliked the house, and Squire rarely visited it after 1908. He sold the estate and gatekeeper's house to developers in 1922.

After the developers went bankrupt, the estate was seized by a local bank. The Cleveland Park Board (precursor to Cleveland Metroparks) purchased most of the land from the bank in 1925. The park board began calling the structure "Squire's Castle". Cleveland Metroparks removed the upper floors and filled in the basement.

Squire's Castle was heavily vandalized over the years, with vandals removing the leaded glass windows and stripping the interior of almost all architectural and decorative details. The structure was somewhat restored in 1995.

== Urban myth ==
On December 26, 1876, Squire married Louisa Christiana Braymaier of Cleveland. She died on October 29, 1927, at Cobblestone Garth in Wickliffe.

A myth about the structure grew up over time. The details varied, but the essential story was that Louisa Squire woke one night during a storm and went downstairs to investigate. Startled by lightning (which illuminated the stuffed heads of animals in the structure's trophy room), she fell down the stairs and broke her neck. According to this legend, her ghost may be seen floating through Squire's Castle. The myth is false, as Louisa Squire did not die in the building.

== Bibliography ==
- Derby, George, ed. (1935). The National Cyclopædia of American Biography. Vol. 24. New York: J.T. White & Company. hdl:2027/mdp.39015078229120.
- Hartman, Jan Cigliano (1991). Showplace of America: Cleveland's Euclid Avenue, 1850–1910. Kent, Ohio: Kent State University Press. ISBN 9780873384452.
- Willis, James A. (2013). The Big Book of Ohio Ghost Stories. Mechanicsburg, Pa.: Stackpole Books. ISBN 9780811711814.
