= Hollywood Plantation =

Historic house in Georgia, United States

- U.S. National Register of Historic Places
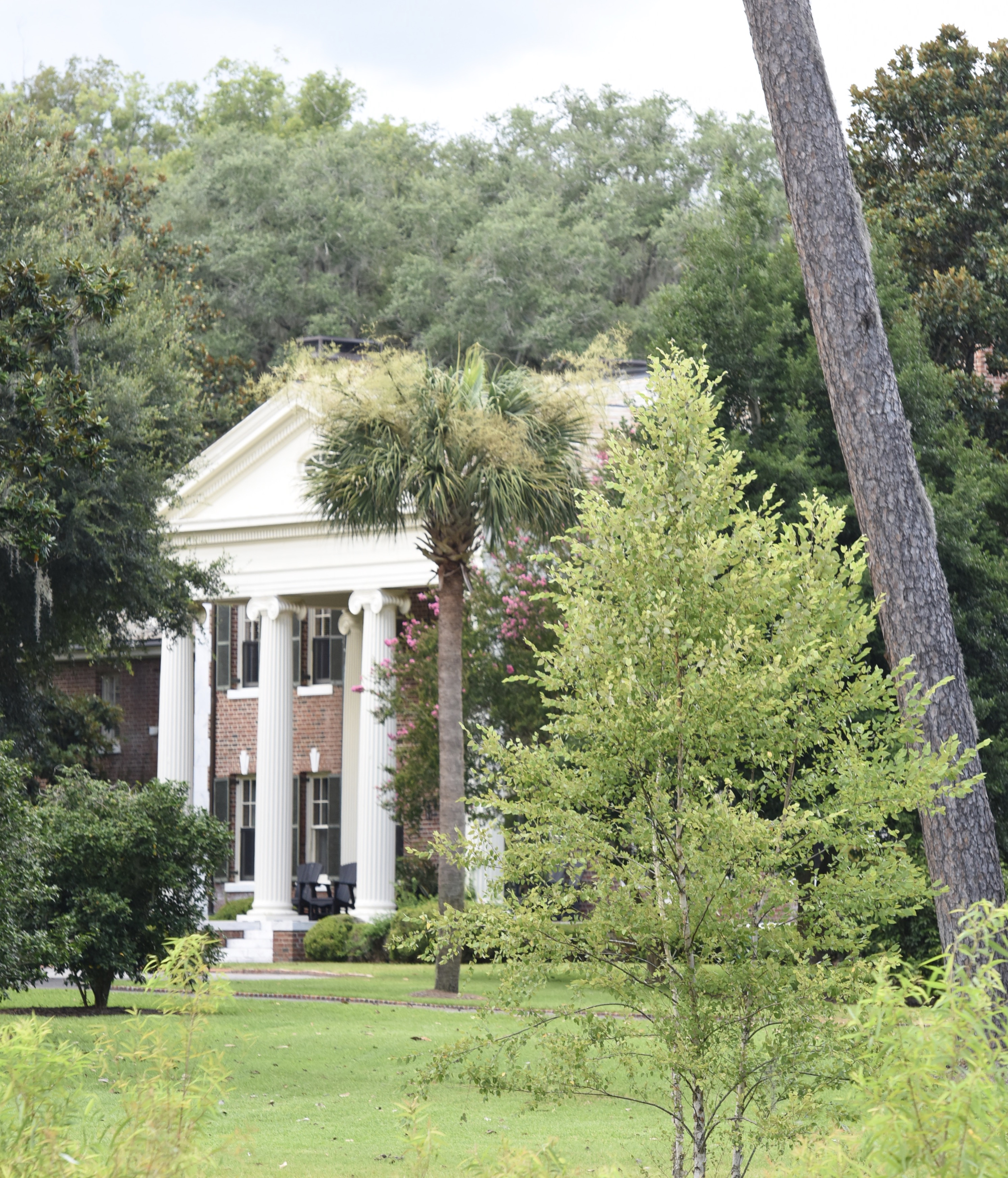

- Location within Georgia Location within the United States
- Location: 1701 Old Monticello Rd., Thomasville, Georgia
- Coordinates: 30°49′13″N 83°57′19″W
- Area: 38 acres (15 ha)
- Built: 1928
- Built by: Ezra Quarterman Stacey
- Architect: John B. Thomas
- Architectural style: Colonial Revival
- NRHP reference No.: 03001138
- Added to NRHP: November 15, 2003

The Hollywood Plantation in Thomasville, Georgia, was listed on the National Register of Historic Places, in 2003. It is a 38 acres (15 ha) property with four contributing buildings, including its main house, which is a Colonial Revival-style mansion built in 1928.

The mansion was built for Mr. and Mrs. Henry K. Devereux, who had owned the property since 1915, and had improved its main house, which got burnt in a fire on January 20, 1928. The new mansion, named "Hollywood," is a brick house with a green slate roof. The front of its central two-story portion, has a pedimented portico with four Ionic columns. It presides from a grassy hill and is approached by a winding drive. Its red brick is laid in Flemish bond; white marble from the Georgia Marble Company of Tate, Georgia is used for keystones, quoins and trim.

It was deemed significant for its architecture and for its use in entertainment/recreation, as used by Henry K. Devereux, who had retired from industry in 1911, and was then a harness horse fancier. He bred and trained harness racing horses at the Pastime Stables, near this property.

The other contributing buildings include a manager/jockey's house (c.1890) and a board-and-batten caretaker's cottage (c.1920). The property also has a contributing structure and several non-contributing buildings and structures.

The mansion was designed by architect John B. Thomas; it was expected to cost $75,000 to build and was built by Ezra Quarterman Stacey. The architect had practiced in New York then moved to the Florida and Georgia area around 1925. Other works by the architect include two projects in the Lake Wales Commercial Historic District, the Rhodesbilt Arcade (1926) and the Burns Arcade (1925-26 remodel).

The property was 225 acres (91 ha) when Devereux bought it, then expanded to 442 acres (179 ha). After Devereux died in 1932, land was sold off for subdivisions and it was reduced to 38 acres in 1958.
