= Joseph Sawyer House =

Historic building in Mentor, Ohio, U.S.

- Twin Maples
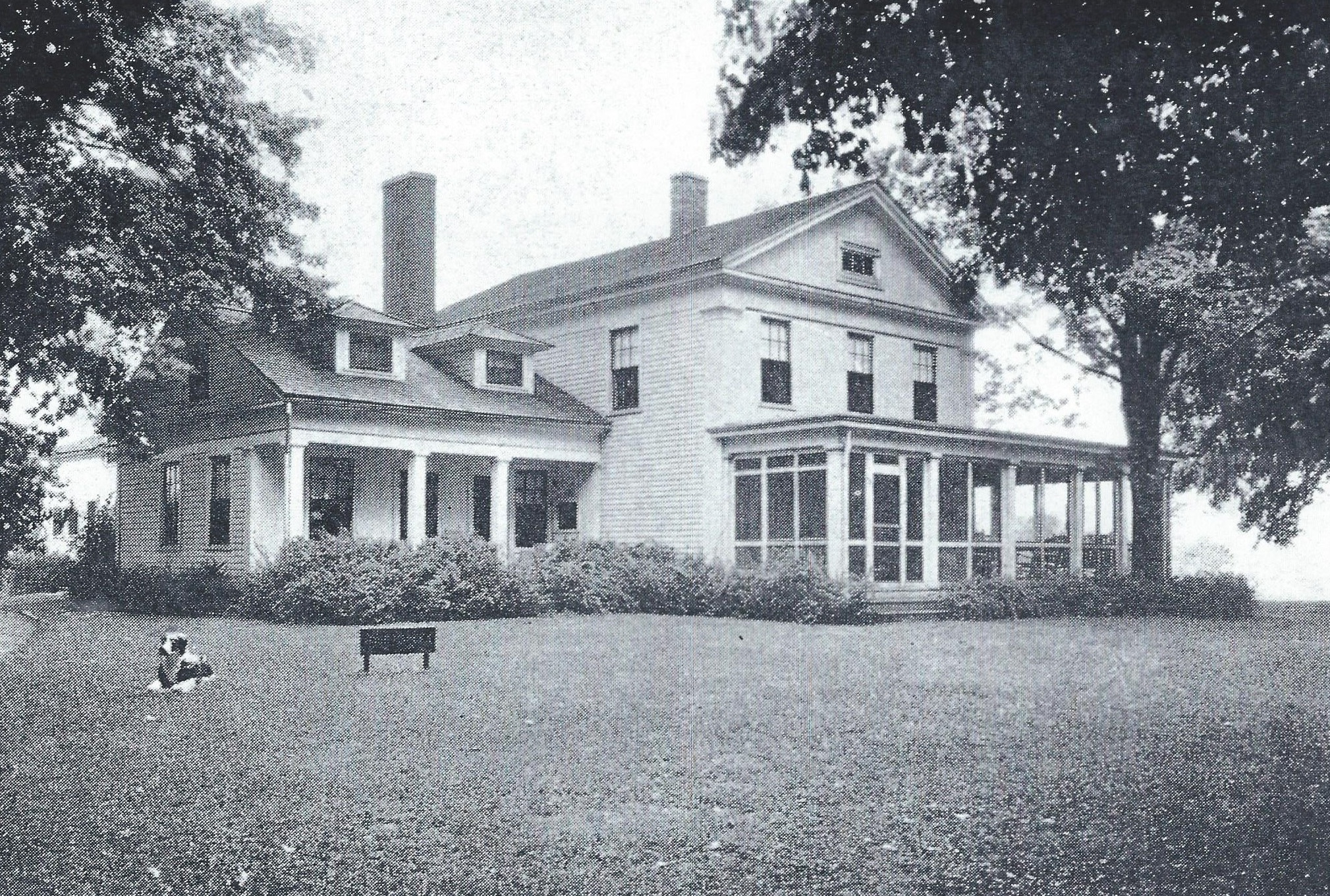
- The house in 1922

- Joseph Sawyer House
- 41°40′30″N 81°18′16″W
- Location: 9364 Forsythe Lane, Mentor, Ohio

History
- Built: c. 1825
- Built for: Joseph Sawyer

Site notes
- Architect: Jonathan Goldsmith
- Architectural style: Greek Revival

The Joseph Sawyer House, also known as the Sawyer-Barrow house and the summer estate Twin Maples, was built c. 1825 for Joseph Sawyer (1778–1849) by the Western Reserve's master builder Jonathan Goldsmith. The house is located in Mentor, Ohio.

== Location ==
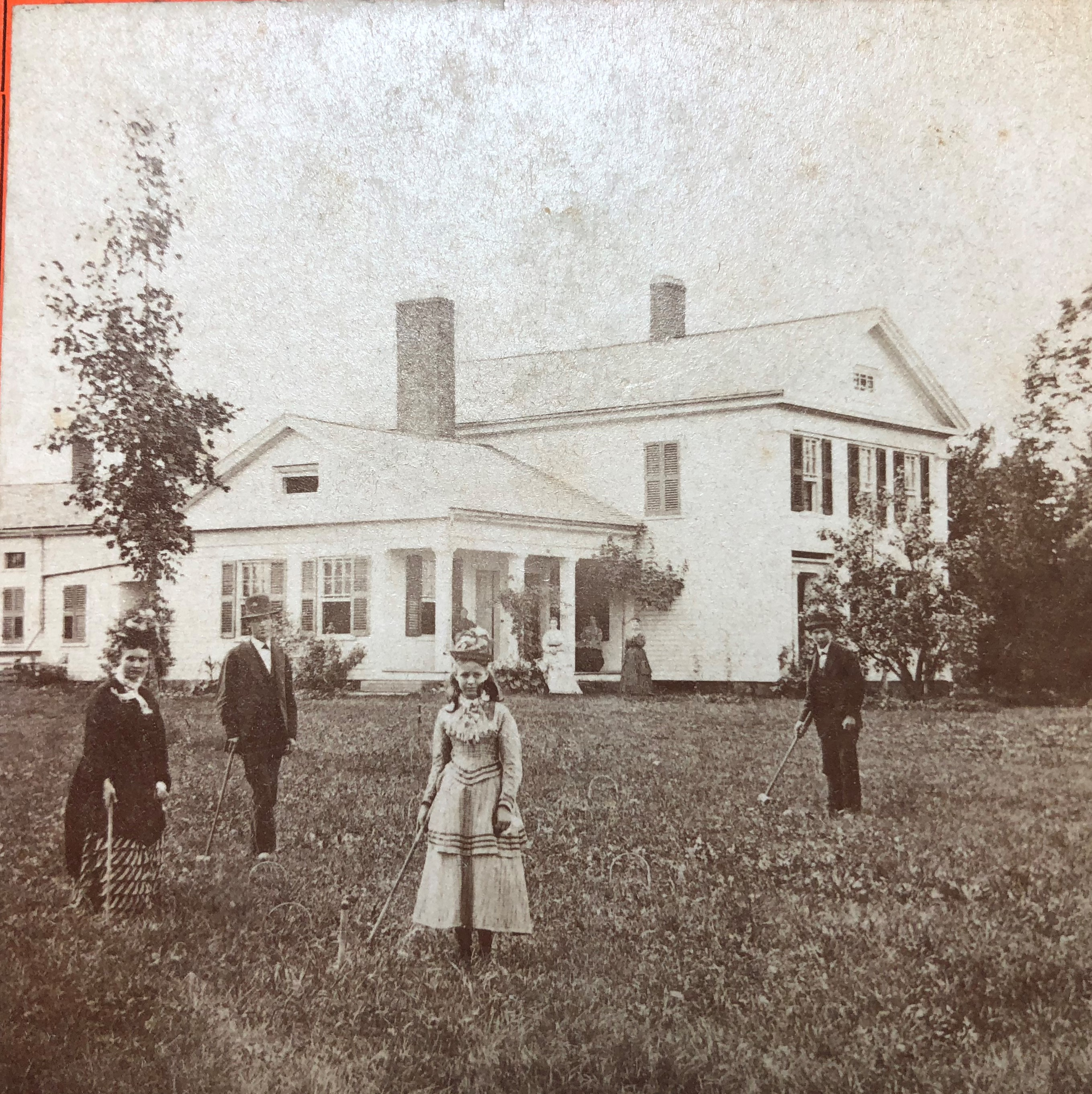
The house in 1873

The house was originally located on the southwestern corner of Mentor Avenue and Chillicothe Road in Mentor, Ohio. From 1885 to 1922 it was stop 66 on the Cleveland, Painesville, and Eastern Intraurban line.
41.6786°N 81.3037°W

In 1961, it was moved a mile south to 9364 Forsythe Lane.

== History ==
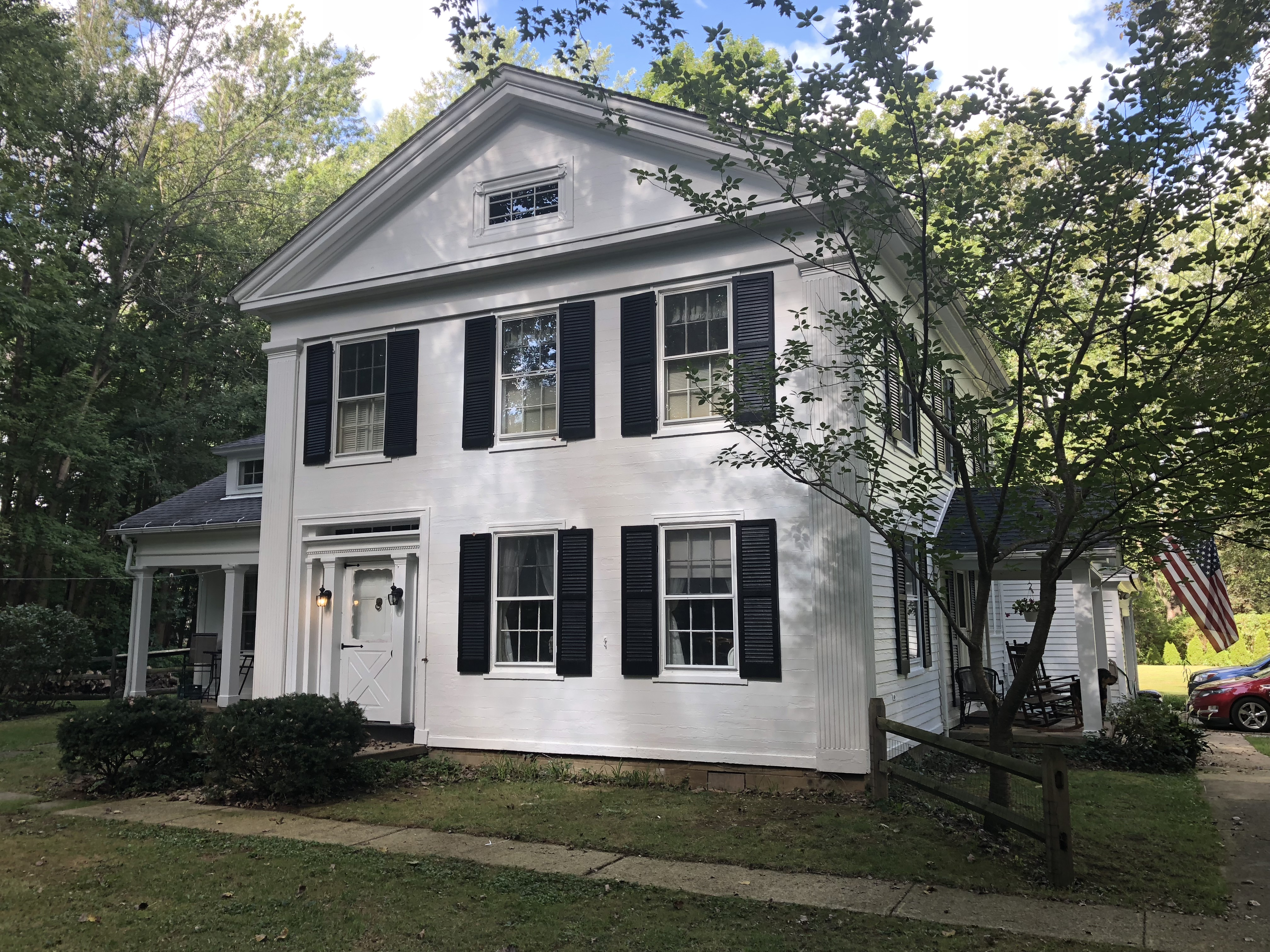
Joseph Sawyer House old and new fronts 2018

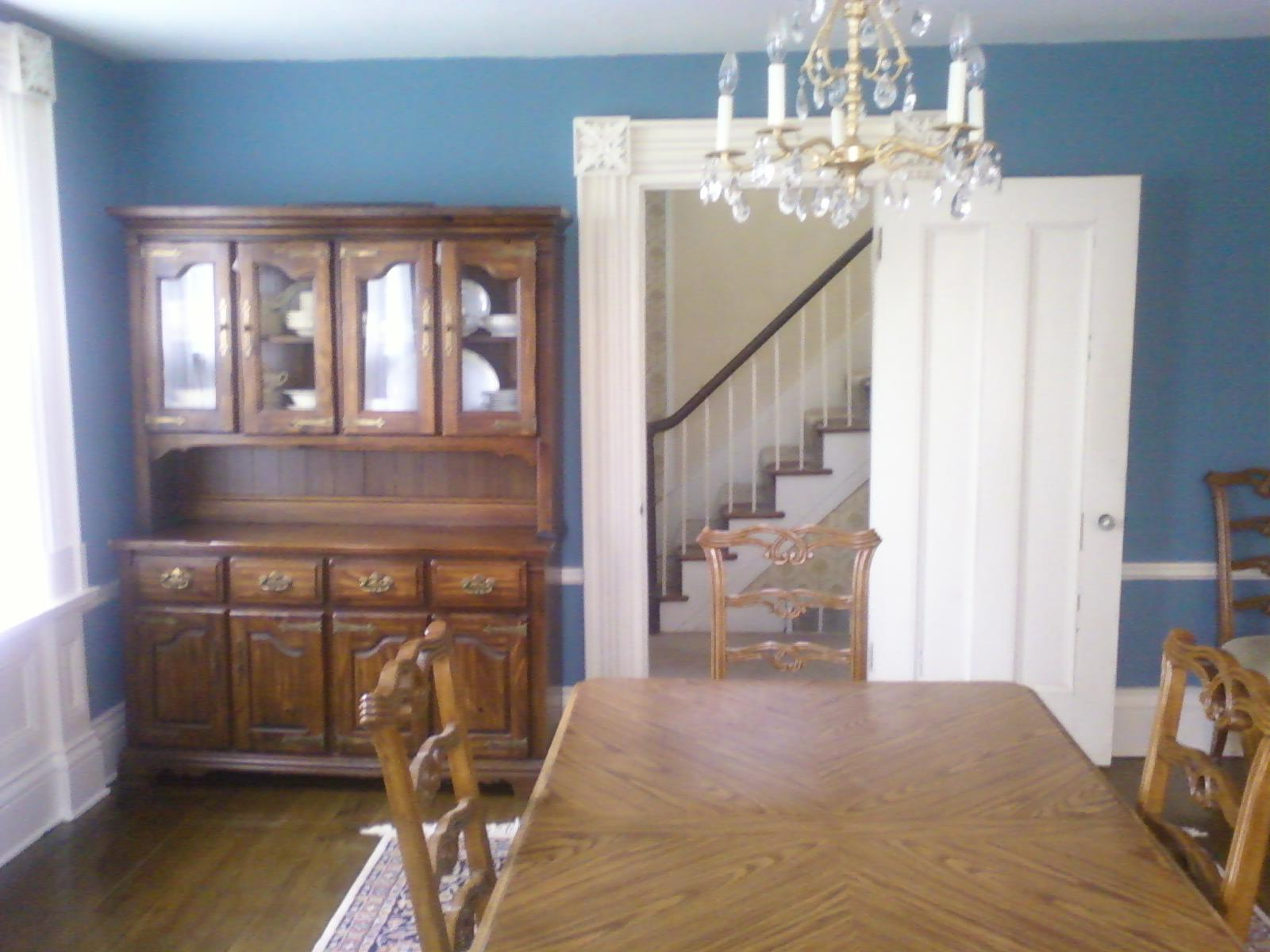
Joseph Sawyer House Dining Room

Arriving in 1811 from Pompey, New York, Joseph Sawyer's family was one of the earliest pioneers to settle in the Connecticut Western Reserve area of Ohio. He built one of the first gristmills in the area and around 1825 he contracted with Jonathan Goldsmith to build a new home in the Greek Revival style. By the time of his death in 1849, Sawyer had amassed over 1,100 acres, making his one of the largest farms in Lake County, Ohio. The house remained in the family until 1883 when his grandson sold it to Luthur L. Cook, a prominent businessman who founded L. L. Cook & Brothers.

It was during this next era that the home was known as Twin Maples. For the next 78 years it was the summer home to a number of wealthy Cleveland businessmen who originally used the Cleveland, Painesville, and Eastern Intraurban line to travel the 25 miles between their winter and summer homes. It was this same line that provided electrical and telephone service to the house.

In 1961, the land was purchased by a local developer, Richard Defranco, to build a gas station but the house was spared as it was moved a mile up the road. The house was extensively updated by another developer, Richard Swerling. One oddity was when the house was moved to the new T-shaped lot it was placed at the end of a long driveway so the old front faced away from the road and into the woods. From the road, with a new garage added, it now gives the appearance of a 1970s colonial because the old front is not easily visible.

== Jonathan Goldsmith ==
Jonathan Gillett Goldsmith (1784–1847) designed and built the Joseph Sawyer house. Goldsmith is considered one of the leading architects of the Connecticut Western Reserve. In Lake County, he built 40 cottages and mansions, four taverns, the Fairport Harbor Lighthouse, a business block, the Painesville National Bank, a school, and with Grand Newell, the Fairport, Painesville, Warren Railroad.
