= Waite Hill, Ohio =

Village in Ohio, United States

- Village
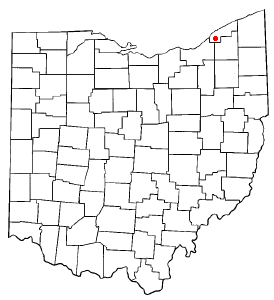
- Location within the state of Ohio

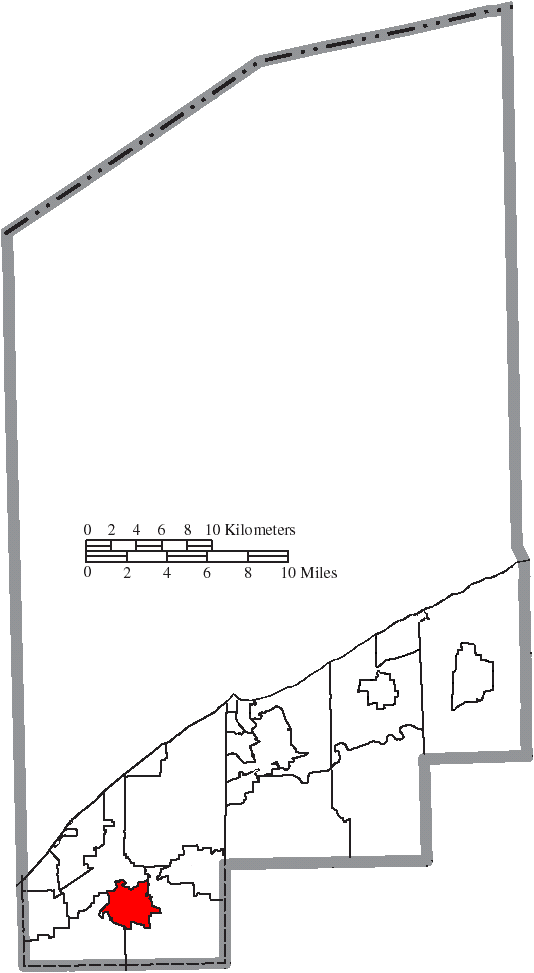
- Location of Waite Hill in Lake County
- Coordinates: 41°36′56″N 81°23′18″W
- Country: United States
- State: Ohio
- County: Lake

Area
  - Total: 4.25 sq mi (11.00 km^{2})
  - Land: 4.18 sq mi (10.83 km^{2})
  - Water: 0.066 sq mi (0.17 km^{2})
- Elevation: 771 ft (235 m)

Population (2020)
  - Total: 543
  - Density: 129.9/sq mi (50.14/km^{2})
- Time zone: UTC-5 (Eastern (EST))
  - Summer (DST): UTC-4 (EDT)
- FIPS code: 39-80402
- GNIS feature ID: 1086433
- Website: https://www.waitehilloh.gov/

Waite Hill is a village in Lake County, Ohio, United States and a rural suburb of Cleveland. The population was 543 at the 2020 census.

== Geography ==
According to the United States Census Bureau, the village has a total area of 4.25 square miles (11.01 km^{2}), of which 4.18 square miles (10.83 km^{2}) is land and 0.07 square miles (0.18 km^{2}) is water.

== Demographics ==
Historical population
Census	Pop.	Note	%±
1930	237		—
1940	289		21.9%
1950	305		5.5%
1960	360		18.0%
1970	514		42.8%
1980	529		2.9%
1990	454		−14.2%
2000	446		−1.8%
2010	471		5.6%
2020	543		15.3%
U.S. Decennial Census

=== 2010 census ===
As of the census of 2010, there were 471 people, 193 households, and 147 families living in the village. The population density was 112.7 inhabitants per square mile (43.5/km^{2}). There were 217 housing units at an average density of 51.9 per square mile (20.0/km^{2}). The racial makeup of the village was 96.8% White, 0.4% African American, 1.3% Asian, 1.1% from other races, and 0.4% from two or more races. Hispanic or Latino of any race were 0.2% of the population.

There were 193 households, of which 22.8% had children under the age of 18 living with them, 71.5% were married couples living together, 3.1% had a female householder with no husband present, 1.6% had a male householder with no wife present, and 23.8% were non-families. 21.8% of all households were made up of individuals, and 10.3% had someone living alone who was 65 years of age or older. The average household size was 2.44 and the average family size was 2.84.

The median age in the village was 52.6 years. 20.6% of residents were under the age of 18; 3.3% were between the ages of 18 and 24; 16.3% were from 25 to 44; 30.4% were from 45 to 64; and 29.3% were 65 years of age or older. The gender makeup of the village was 50.5% male and 49.5% female.

=== 2000 census ===
As of the census of 2000, there were 446 people, 183 households, and 144 families living in the village. The population density was 105.9 inhabitants per square mile (40.9/km^{2}). There were 197 housing units at an average density of 46.8 per square mile (18.1/km^{2}). The racial makeup of the village was 98.21% White, 0.90% Asian, and 0.90% from two or more races. 19.9% were of English, 11.2% German, 10.1% Irish, 9.6% Italian, 7.7% Slovene and 5.7% American ancestry according to Census 2000.

There were 183 households, out of which 19.7% had children under the age of 18 living with them, 75.4% were married couples living together, 2.2% had a female householder with no husband present, and 20.8% were non-families. 13.7% of all households were made up of individuals, and 4.4% had someone living alone who was 65 years of age or older. The average household size was 2.44 and the average family size was 2.71.

In the village, the population was spread out, with 16.6% under the age of 18, 3.6% from 18 to 24, 17.0% from 25 to 44, 38.3% from 45 to 64, and 24.4% who were 65 years of age or older. The median age was 52 years. For every 100 females there were 102.7 males. For every 100 females age 18 and over, there were 100.0 males.

The median income for a household in the village was $97,595, and the median income for a family was $134,041. Males had a median income of $76,790 versus $32,188 for females. The per capita income for the village was $61,408. About 1.4% of families and 0.9% of the population were below the poverty line, including none of those under the age of eighteen or sixty-five or over.

== Education ==
The municipality is divided between the Willoughby-Eastlake School District and the Kirtland Local School District.

== Notable inhabitants ==
- Tim Misny, personal injury lawyer
