= Painesville Township, Lake County, Ohio =

Township in Ohio, US

- Township
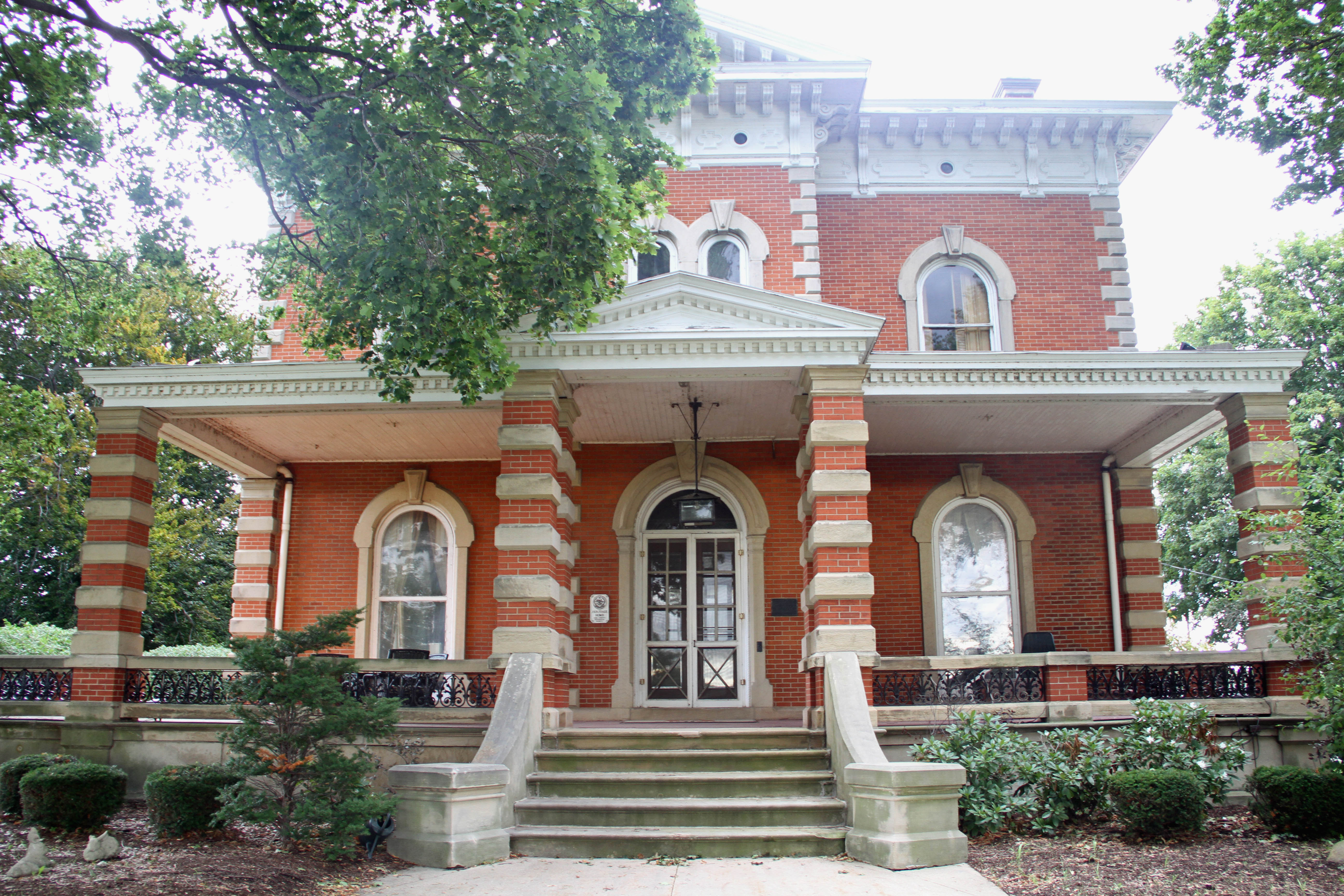
- The Casement House, a historic site in the township

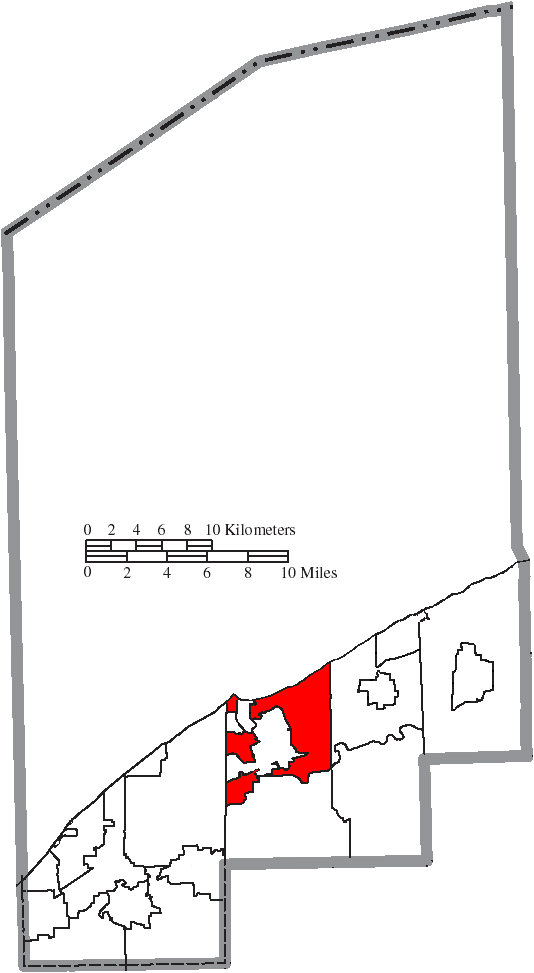
- Location of Painesville Township in Lake County
- Coordinates: 41°43′44″N 81°15′35″W
- Country: United States
- State: Ohio
- County: Lake

Area
  - Total: 177.4 sq mi (459.5 km^{2})
  - Land: 16.8 sq mi (43.5 km^{2})
  - Water: 160.6 sq mi (416.0 km^{2})
- Elevation: 705 ft (215 m)

Population (2020)
  - Total: 20,453
  - Density: 1,220/sq mi (470/km^{2})
- Time zone: UTC-5 (Eastern (EST))
  - Summer (DST): UTC-4 (EDT)
- ZIP code: 44077
- Area code: 440
- FIPS code: 39-59430
- GNIS feature ID: 1086429
- Website: www.painesvilletwp.com

Painesville Township is one of the five townships of Lake County, Ohio, United States. The population was 20,453 at the 2020 census. It is a part of Greater Cleveland in the Northeast Ohio Region, and is included in the Cleveland-Akron-Canton, Ohio combined statistical area in the United States.

== Name and history ==
Painesville Township is included in what is historically referred to as the Connecticut Western Reserve. General Edward Paine (1746–1841), who had served as a captain in the Connecticut militia during the war, arrived in 1800 with a party of 66 settlers. General Paine later represented the region in the territorial legislature of the Northwest Territory.

Lake County was established on March 6, 1840, from land given by Cuyahoga and Geauga counties, and derived its name from its location on the southern shore of Lake Erie. The county seat, Painesville, was named after General Paine, and the county was divided further with the creation of Perry, LeRoy, Painesville, Mentor, Kirtland, and Concord Townships.

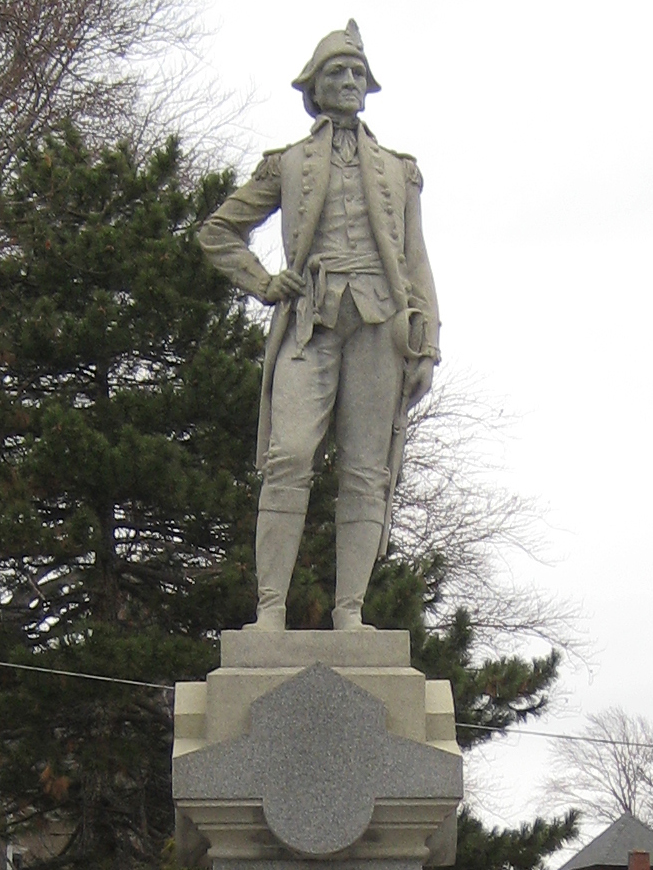
Statue of General Edward Paine in Painesville

== Geography ==
Painesville Township contains four major disjunct sections. Located in the northern part of the county along Lake Erie, it borders the following townships and city:

- Perry Township - east
- LeRoy Township - southeast corner
- Concord Township - south
- Mentor - west

Several municipalities are located in Painesville Township:

- The village of Fairport Harbor, in the northwest along the lakeshore
- The village of Grand River, in the northwest
- The unincorporated community of Painesville-on-the-Lake, in the north center

The township surrounds the city of Painesville, but is separate from it.

According to the U.S. Census Bureau, the township has a total area of 177.4 square miles (459.5 km^{2}), of which 16.8 square miles (43.5 km^{2}) are land and 160.6 square miles (416.0 km^{2}), or 90.5%, are water. The township boundaries extend north to the center of Lake Erie and the Canadian border.

== Climate ==
Painesville City, and surrounding Painesville Township, have a hybrid between a humid subtropical and humid continental climate (Köppen Cfa/Dfa). In spite of the mild winter days, lake-effect snow usually brings a lot of accumulation in winter. Summers have warm days and quite muggy nights. Precipitation is high year-round.

Climate data for Painesville, Ohio (1991–2020 normals), extremes since 1950
Month	Jan	Feb	Mar	Apr	May	Jun	Jul	Aug	Sep	Oct	Nov	Dec	Year
Record high °F (°C)	70 (21)	77 (25)	82 (28)	91 (33)	93 (34)	98 (37)	96 (36)	96 (36)	96 (36)	91 (33)	81 (27)	75 (24)	98 (37)
Mean maximum °F (°C)	58.9 (14.9)	59.7 (15.4)	70.0 (21.1)	79.8 (26.6)	84.6 (29.2)	89.7 (32.1)	90.2 (32.3)	89.8 (32.1)	87.2 (30.7)	80.0 (26.7)	69.0 (20.6)	60.3 (15.7)	92.5 (33.6)
Mean daily maximum °F (°C)	36.8 (2.7)	38.7 (3.7)	46.1 (7.8)	58.1 (14.5)	69.1 (20.6)	78.1 (25.6)	82.3 (27.9)	81.6 (27.6)	76.2 (24.6)	64.9 (18.3)	52.6 (11.4)	42.0 (5.6)	60.5 (15.8)
Daily mean °F (°C)	30.2 (−1.0)	31.4 (−0.3)	38.2 (3.4)	49.2 (9.6)	60.3 (15.7)	69.8 (21.0)	74.6 (23.7)	73.7 (23.2)	67.8 (19.9)	57.0 (13.9)	45.7 (7.6)	36.2 (2.3)	52.8 (11.6)
Mean daily minimum °F (°C)	23.7 (−4.6)	24.1 (−4.4)	30.2 (−1.0)	40.4 (4.7)	51.4 (10.8)	61.5 (16.4)	66.9 (19.4)	65.7 (18.7)	59.4 (15.2)	49.1 (9.5)	38.8 (3.8)	30.3 (−0.9)	45.1 (7.3)
Mean minimum °F (°C)	5.4 (−14.8)	7.6 (−13.6)	14.2 (−9.9)	27.4 (−2.6)	37.8 (3.2)	48.0 (8.9)	55.3 (12.9)	53.9 (12.2)	45.3 (7.4)	35.6 (2.0)	25.1 (−3.8)	14.4 (−9.8)	2.7 (−16.3)
Record low °F (°C)	−19 (−28)	−9 (−23)	0 (−18)	17 (−8)	25 (−4)	37 (3)	43 (6)	39 (4)	27 (−3)	24 (−4)	5 (−15)	−11 (−24)	−19 (−28)
Average precipitation inches (mm)	3.14 (80)	2.15 (55)	2.83 (72)	3.47 (88)	3.42 (87)	3.63 (92)	4.12 (105)	3.44 (87)	3.91 (99)	4.04 (103)	3.17 (81)	3.14 (80)	40.46 (1,029)
Average precipitation days (≥ 0.01 in)	15.7	12.5	12.6	13.2	12.6	11.4	9.6	9.6	9.1	13.1	13.5	14.1	147.0
Source 1: NOAA
Source 2: National Weather Service

== Demographics ==
The population of Painesville Township in 2020 was 20,453, with the following racial distribution: White: 90%, Black: 2%, Hispanic: 5%, Native: 1%, two or more races: 2%.

The Per Capita income for a family of three is $114,696 and the median household income is $76,036. For residents 25 years and older, 93% have a high school diploma, 18.7% have a Bachelor's degree, and 7% have a post graduate degree.

== Government ==
The township is governed by a three-member board of trustees, who are elected in November of odd-numbered years to a four-year term beginning on the following January 1. Two are elected in the year after the presidential election and one is elected in the year before it. There is also an elected township fiscal officer, who serves a four-year term beginning on April 1 of the year after the election, which is held in November of the year before the presidential election. Vacancies in the fiscal officership or on the board of trustees are filled by the remaining trustees. Painesville Township has voted on several occasions on whether or not to merge with Painesville City. The township has voted to stay independent of the city primarily to maintain its lower real estate tax structure and support its separate school system

== Transportation ==
=== Highways ===
Major transportation routes in the township are U.S. Route 20 and State Routes 2, 84 and Ohio State Route 44. Painesville Township is located just north of Interstate 90 and is easily accessed via Ohio State Route 44.

=== Mass Transit ===
Laketran operates bus lines throughout Lake County as well as into downtown Cleveland and Cleveland's major medical centers in University Circle.

=== Railroads ===
Two major railroads, CSX and Norfolk Southern, pass through the township and serve some of the township's industries. Additionally, Amtrak's Lake Shore Limited passes through on the CSX line. However, these trains do not stop in the township. The nearest Amtrak station is 28 miles (45 km) to the southwest in Cleveland.

=== Airports ===
Painesville Township is 43 miles (69 km) from Cleveland Hopkins International Airport, Ohio's largest airport.

== Healthcare ==
The Painesville City and Painesville Township healthcare needs are provided in neighboring Concord Township by University Hospitals Cleveland Medical Center and Tri-Point Medical Center. The hospital is part of the Lake Health healthcare system.

== Economy ==
Painesville Township is home to several industries, including a Berkshire Hathaway's Lubrizol Corporation facility, Avery Dennison, and Nova Chemicals.

== Education ==
=== Public ===
Painesville Township is home to the Riverside Local School District, formerly the Painesville Township Local Schools. Its schools include Riverside High School, John R. Williams Junior High School, Lamuth Middle School and four elementary schools. Painesville city and Fairport Harbor operate their own school districts, while Grand River village, Leroy and Concord township students attend Riverside's schools.

=== Higher Education ===
Lake Erie College, a private liberal arts college enrolling approximately 1,200 students is located in neighboring Painesville. The college offers over 60 undergraduate programs and master's programs. The former Andrews Osborne Academy's Painesville campus became part of Lake Erie College in 2008.

Lakeland Community College, located in nearby Kirtland, Ohio, offers Associate Degree level education to residents of Painesville Township and Lake County.

=== Public Library ===
Morley Library serves both Painesville City and Painesville Township residents and is located in Painesville's 284-acre (115 ha) Historic Downtown District.

== Recreation ==
Painesville Township is home to the Lake County Fair, which is held every August. Events such as harness racing and tractor pulling competitions, as well as concerts performed by big name country music bands, take place at the fair.

Nearly 80% of Headlands Beach State Park is in Painesville Township; the remainder lies in the neighboring community of Mentor. The beach is the longest natural beach in Ohio. The US Coast Guard has a base in the township located just east of Headlands Beach.

== Notable people ==
- Mike Celizic, author and columnist and graduate of Riverside High School (Painesville Township, Ohio)
- Dan O'Shannon, television writer and producer and graduate of Riverside High School (Painesville Township, Ohio)
- Scott Shafer, football coach and graduate of Riverside High School (Painesville Township, Ohio)
- Jason Short, NFL player and graduate of Riverside High School (Painesville Township, Ohio)
