= Morley Library =

Coordinates: 41.727636°N 81.24299°W

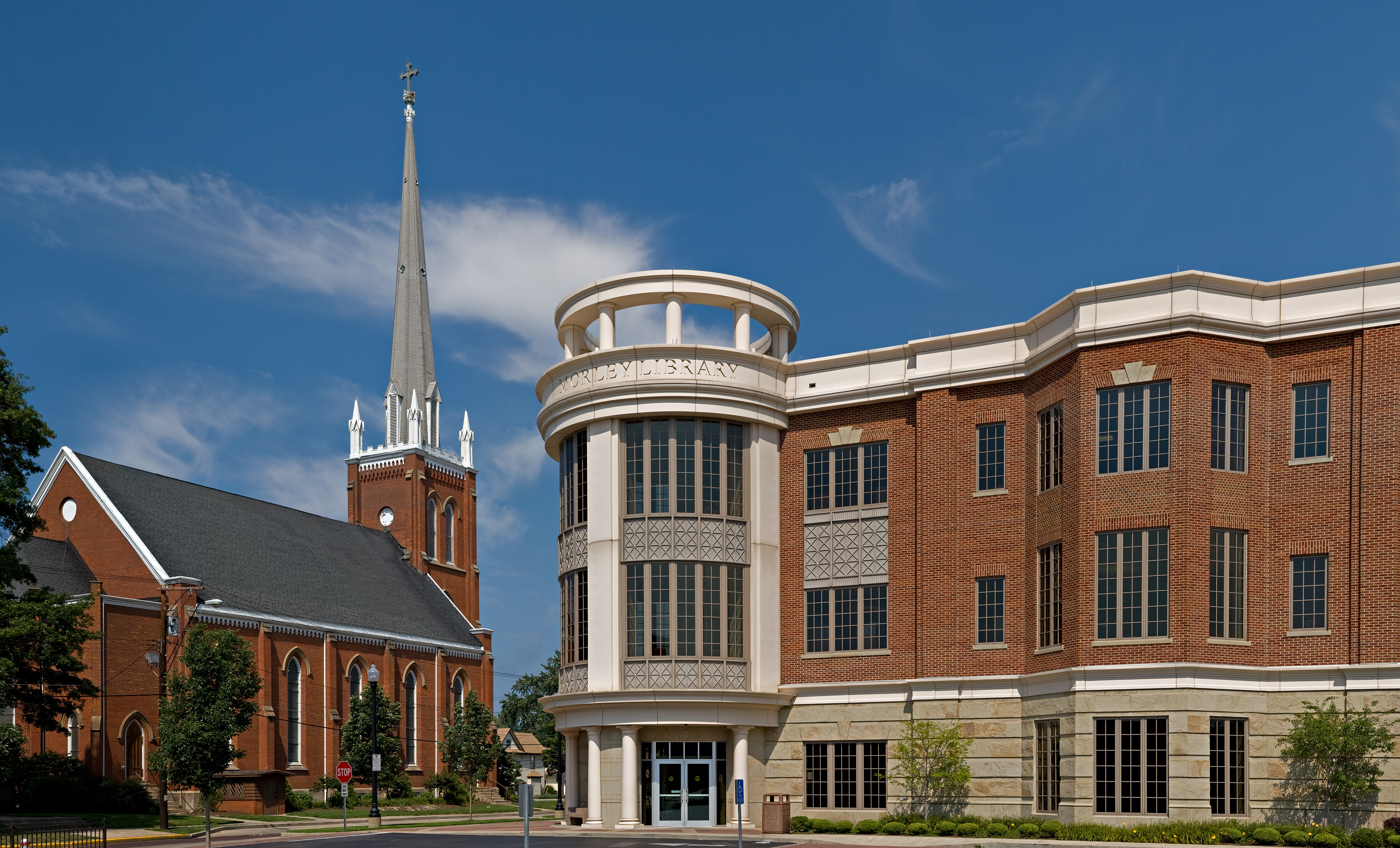
Morley Library. St James Episcopal Church can be seen to the left.

Morley Library, located at 184 Phelps St. in Painesville, Ohio serves as the County District Library for Lake County, Ohio. Morley Library is a medium-sized public library that is supported by both state funds and a local tax levy. The original library was founded in 1899. In 2007, Morley Library was visited by 342,870 people and circulated 689,694 items. The collection includes 180,490 items. Morley Library serves 48,650 people in Painesville City, Painesville Township, Grand River, Leroy Township, and part of Concord Township.

== History ==
The nucleus of the library was provided by the local Women's Christian Temperance Union, which established a temperance library and reading room in 1878. After librarian Mary Dean's death in 1898, friends set about fulfilling her dream of a free public library. Other groups donated more books, the Village of Painesville (which became a city in 1902) agreed to provide tax funds, and local businessman Jesse Healy Morley bought the land and erected the building. The library was named in honor of his parents. Morley Library opened its doors in October 1899, with Julia Erwin as librarian. Additions to the building were made in 1937 and 1978.

In November 2001, Morley Library's bond issue of $11.59 million was passed in a general election. A groundbreaking ceremony on May 14, 2003 marked the official start to construction of a new building—a three-story library designed by Meehan Architects of Cleveland, Ohio (now Holzheimer Bolek + Meehan). The original building closed to the public at 5:00 PM on Sunday, October 17, 2004. The new Morley Library building opened to the public on November 7, 2004, with a ribbon cutting ceremony. The building was officially dedicated on Sunday, February 13, 2005. It is 61,000 square feet (5,700 m^{2}).

== Special collection ==
Morley Library has a special collection to help those interested in researching their family genealogy and local Painesville history. The collection includes a variety of atlases, birth records, cemetery records, census enumerations, church records, city directories, high school and college yearbooks, magazines, marriage records, military records, naturalization records, newspapers, obituaries, telephone books and wills. Morley Library also subscribes to a number of Internet-based resources for genealogy and local history research.

== Special services ==
- Book discussion clubs – five different monthly groups
- Foundation Center – Morley Library is a Cooperating Collection of the Foundation Center
- Homebound – delivery service for patrons who cannot come to the library.
- InterLibrary Loan (ILL) – Morley Library currently participates in Ohio’s Moving Ohio Resources Everywhere (MORE) program to share items. As such, patrons can request items to be sent from other libraries to Morley to be borrowed.
- Internet access – introduced in 1997 through the Ohio Public Library Information Network. Funding assistance has also been received through the Bill and Melinda Gates Foundation. Access is freely available to all patrons. Free WiFi access is also offered throughout the building.
- Language – collections and programs for English language learners
- Literacy – Open Book Family Learning Center assists children and families with literacy needs
- Programming – movie showings, educational lectures, tea groups & more
- Story time – stories and activities for children ages 6 months to 10 years
