= Riverside Local School District =

School district in Ohio, United States

Address
- 585 Riverside Drive Painesville, Ohio, 44077; United States
- Coordinates: 41°43′44″N 81°15′35″W

District information
- Type: Public
- Grades: PK–12
- Superintendent: Christopher J. Rateno
- Schools: 6
- NCES District ID: 3910014

Students and staff
- Students: 4,112 (2024–2025)
- Teachers: 202.04 (on an FTE basis) (2024–2025)
- Staff: 406.81 (on an FTE basis) (2024–2025)
- Student–teacher ratio: 20.35 (2024–2025)

Other information
- Website: www.riversidelocalschools.com

Riverside Local School District, formerly named Painesville Township Local School District until July 1, 2007, is a K-12 (primary and secondary education) school district in Ohio.

== Location ==
The Riverside Local School District encompasses the following locations of Lake County, Ohio:

- Painesville Township, Ohio
- Concord Township, Ohio
- Leroy Township, Ohio
- Grand River, Ohio

It includes Grand River and a portion of Painesville.

== Schools ==
The Riverside Local School District has one high school campus for both junior and senior high school students, one middle school, and four elementary schools.

=== High school ===
Riverside High School is the only high school in the district. Students in grades ten through twelve attend Riverside. On the same campus, and connected to Riverside by the Campus Library, is John R. Williams Junior High School, which encompasses students in grades eight and nine. Students in all grades often take classes in both buildings.

=== Middle school ===
Henry F. LaMuth Middle School (Auburn Middle School until around 2000) is the only middle school in the district. District students in grades 6 and 7 attend LaMuth.

==== Classes ====
You will get to pick whether to join band, with Mr. Swisslocki teaching, or choir, with Mr. Allen. Other than the core and music classes, students will also get special classes, art, computer, and gym for 12 weeks each.

=== Elementary schools ===
There are four elementary schools in the Riverside Local School District. Each elementary school has students from kindergarten through grade five. Each elementary school is part of the Ohio Reads tutoring program in conjunction with Riverside High School's National Honor Society program and each elementary school's after-school supervision program.

- Buckeye Elementary - in Concord
- Parkside Elementary - in Concord
- Riverview Elementary in Painesville
- Melridge Elementary - in Concord.

== New Facilities ==
In November 2016 the residents of Painesville Township voted to approve a bond levy that allows the Riverside Local School District to construct two new elementary schools to replace four older ones. These buildings began construction in early 2018.

=== Zoning Issues ===
During the final planning stages of the new Concord Township school the Concord Township Board of Zoning Appeal's heard from the public and decided to deny the permit for the district to build on a plot of land it had purchased. The district later decided to take the Board of Zoning Appeal's to court where they reached a final settlement where the district agreed to change some aspects of its new school including the removal of the planned baseball field as well as meeting with the township and sheriffs for an outdoor security lighting schedule. In return the township agreed to allow the district to build on the plot of land it had purchased.
