= Perry Nuclear Generating Station =

Nuclear power plant in North Perry, Ohio, United States

Perry Nuclear Power Plant
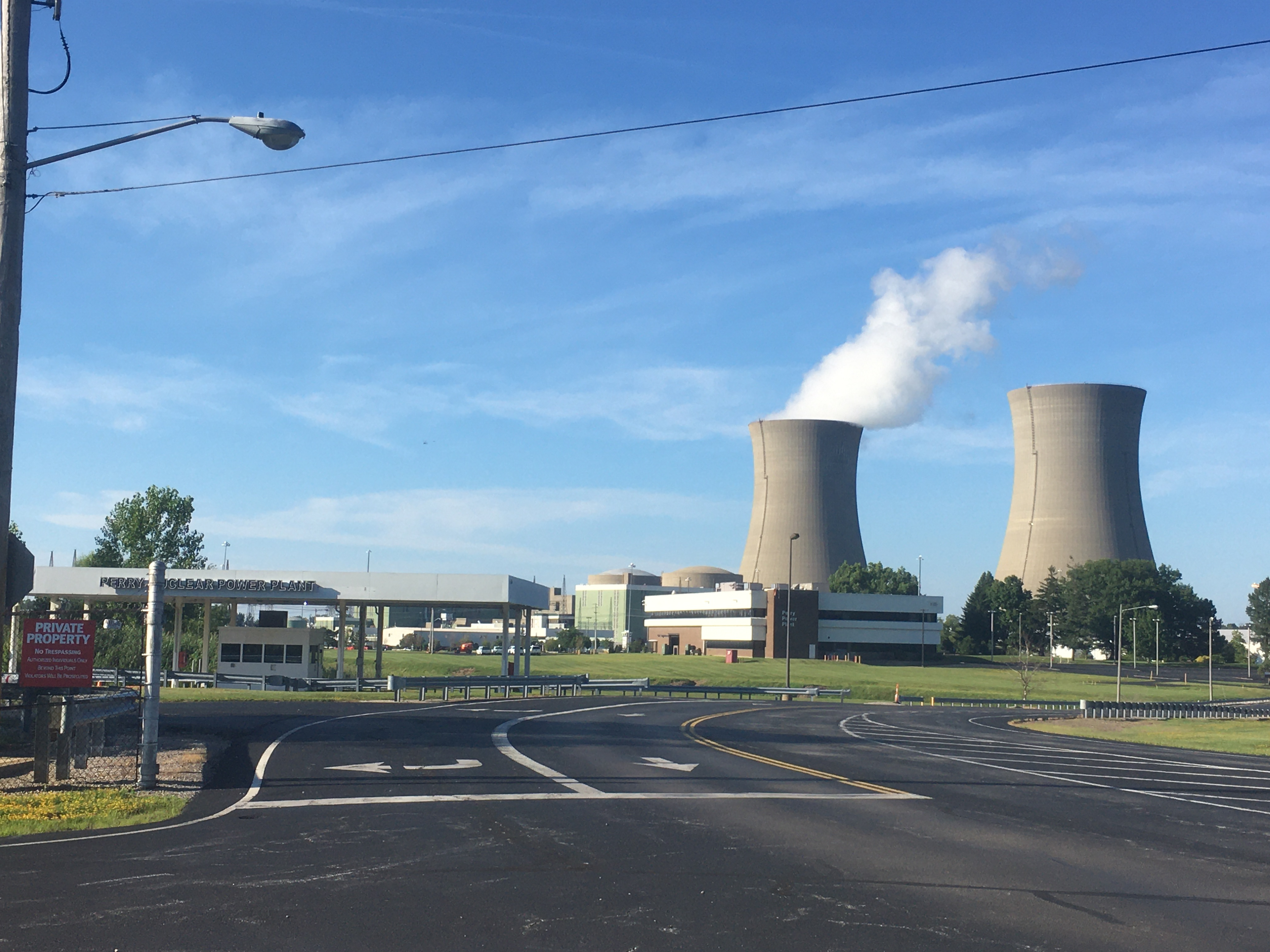
- The plant as seen from Parmly Road
- Country: United States
- Location: North Perry, Lake County, Ohio
- Coordinates: 41°48′3″N 81°8′36″W
- Status: Operational
- Construction began: October 1, 1974
- Commission date: November 18, 1987
- Construction cost: $6.024 billion (2007 USD) ($8.75 billion in 2024 dollars)
- Owner: Vistra Corp
- Operator: Vistra Corp

Nuclear power station
- Reactor type: BWR
- Reactor supplier: General Electric
- Cooling towers: 2 × Natural Draft (one in use)
- Cooling source: Lake Erie
- Thermal capacity: 1 × 3758 MW_{th}

Power generation
- Units operational: 1 × 1256 MW
- Make and model: BWR-6 (Mark 3)
- Units cancelled: 1 × 1205 MW
- Nameplate capacity: 1256 MW
- Capacity factor: 89.18% (2017); 80.80% (lifetime)
- Annual net output: 9703 GWh (2021)

External links
- Website: Perry
- Commons: Related media on Commons

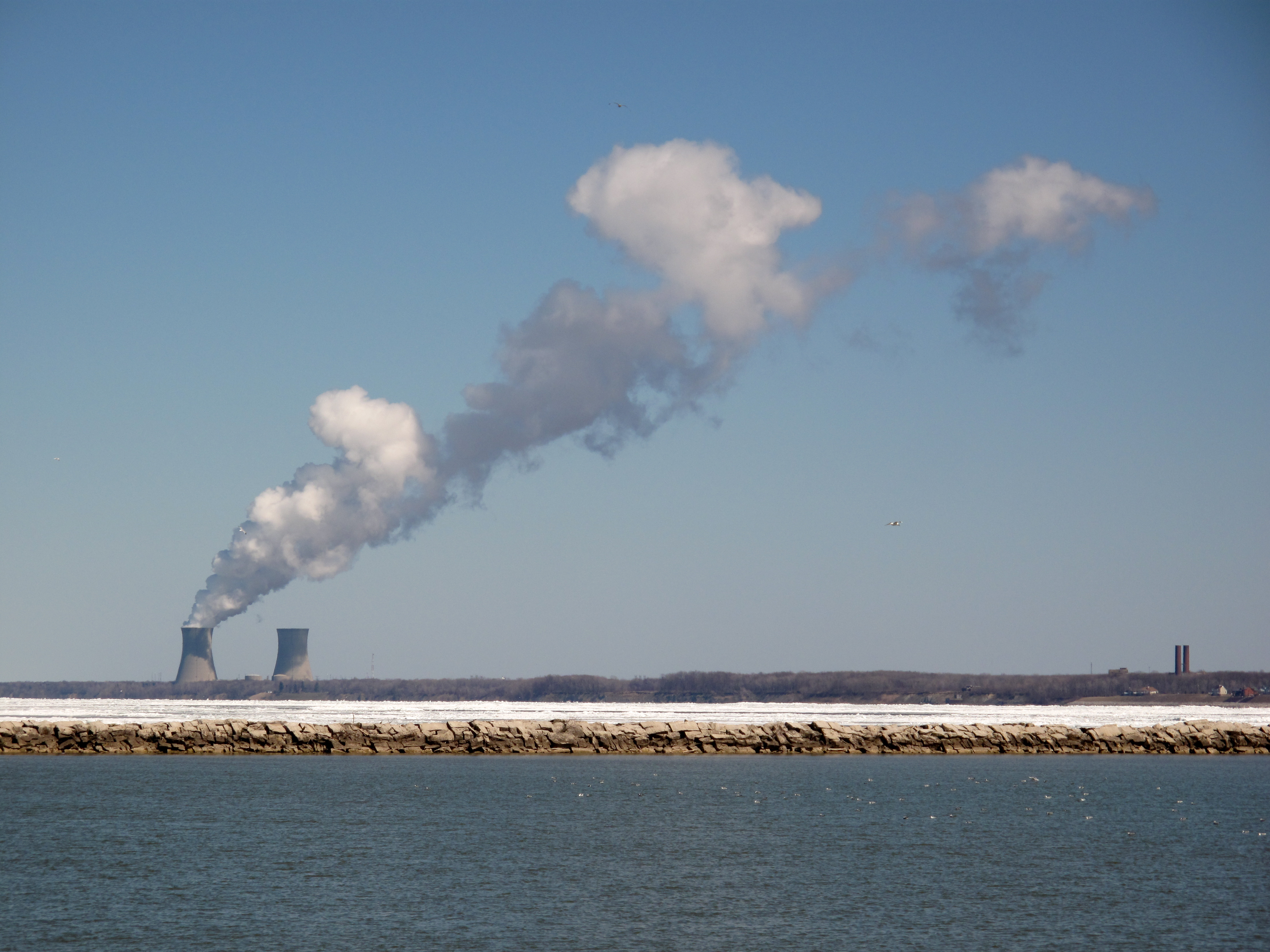
Perry as seen from Headlands Park, Ohio

The Perry Nuclear Power Plant is located on a 1,100 acres (450 ha) site on Lake Erie, 40 miles (64 km) northeast of Cleveland in North Perry, Ohio, US. The nuclear power plant is owned and operated by Vistra Corporation.

The reactor is a General Electric BWR-6 boiling water reactor design, with a Mark III containment design. The original core power level of 3,579 megawatts thermal was increased to 3,758 megawatts thermal in 2000, making Perry one of the largest BWRs in the United States.

Perry was expected to close in 2021 as it is no longer profitable to run when competing against natural gas plants. To avert this, Ohio House Bill 6 was signed into law in July 2019 which added a fee to residents' utility bills that funded subsidies of $150 million per year to Perry and the Davis–Besse nuclear plant to keep both plants operational. However, the bill was alleged to be part of the Ohio nuclear bribery scandal revealed by the United States Department of Justice (DOJ) in July 2020.

== History ==
Perry was originally designed as a two-unit installation, but construction on Unit 2 was suspended in 1985 and formally cancelled in 1994. At the time of cancellation, all of the major buildings and structures for the second unit were completed, including the 500-foot-tall (150 m) cooling tower. It is possible that a second unit could be constructed on the site, but current economic and regulatory conditions are not conducive to doing so (in addition to back taxes that would be due to the "abandon in place" designations on many objects in Unit 2).

Eleven hundred acres at the Perry plant were designated in 1993 as an urban wildlife sanctuary by the National Institute for Urban Wildlife. The area has trees, shrubs, streams and ponds; and a habitat for heron, belted kingfisher, ducks and geese. The forested area is ideal for the crane-fly orchid, a rare species in Ohio. The site includes a wetland that contains spotted turtles, an endangered species in Ohio.

On March 28, 2010, there was a fire in a lubrication system for one of the water pumps that feeds water for generation of steam. Reactor power automatically lowered to 68% due to the reduction in feed water flow, and the fire was extinguished in less than three hours. Two plant fire brigade personnel were brought to a local hospital for "heat stress" following the fire. No customers lost power during this event. On February 9, 2016, the plant was unexpectedly shut down for maintenance to a recirculation pump. The reactor was brought back to full power by February 20, 2016.

In July 2023, Energy Harbor applied for a license renewal for the Perry nuclear power plant, requesting an additional 20 years of operation. This license renewal for Unit 1 was officially approved on July 7, 2025 and will now expire November 7, 2046.

In March 2024, Texas-based Vistra Corp announced it had completed an acquisition of Energy Harbor Corp. and its nuclear generation fleet assets, which was previously announced in March 2023. In addition to Perry, Vistra also owns and operates the Davis-Besse, Beaver Valley, and through their subsidiary Luminant, the Comanche Peak nuclear power plants.

	Unit 1	Unit 2
Reactor Type	BWR-6	
Reactor Manufacturer	General Electric	
Turbine Manufacturer	General Electric	
Thermal Power	3,758 megawatts	Unit canceled in 1994
Electrical Output	1,260 megawatts	Unit canceled in 1994
Transmission System Connection	345,000 volts	Unit canceled in 1994
Construction Permit Issued	May 3, 1977	May 3, 1977 (construction suspended in 1985)
Initial Criticality	June 1986	Unit canceled in 1994
First Electrical Generation	November 13, 1986	Unit canceled in 1994
Operational Date	November 18, 1987	Unit canceled in 1994
Expiration of Original License	March 18, 2026	Unit canceled in 1994

== Electricity production ==
Generation (MWh) of Perry Nuclear Power Plant
Year	Jan	Feb	Mar	Apr	May	Jun	Jul	Aug	Sep	Oct	Nov	Dec	Annual (Total)
2001	822,248	402,972	123,568	798,883	142,023	802,067	324,672	912,057	900,239	930,817	900,034	719,864	7,779,444
2002	918,229	799,411	939,038	900,714	930,813	481,701	909,817	918,977	594,820	745,370	904,754	931,166	9,974,810
2003	930,209	764,817	788,525	82,043	-7,910	867,503	919,276	678,084	809,632	920,924	856,928	935,145	8,545,176
2004	903,869	876,390	916,173	900,902	624,410	694,868	918,960	919,636	872,942	919,947	899,443	779,786	10,227,326
2005	121,586	549,786	-8,878	-12,730	640,649	888,993	912,172	910,533	890,892	912,803	902,642	938,200	7,646,648
2006	904,098	848,230	936,789	880,942	798,087	894,530	906,324	915,903	878,179	918,424	903,221	690,646	10,475,373
2007	925,628	841,117	906,738	8,911	294,340	684,060	168,786	931,004	898,058	929,063	837,810	632,732	8,058,247
2008	951,553	891,180	886,866	598,092	940,362	880,150	921,451	928,586	890,697	950,446	914,227	936,983	10,690,593
2009	944,877	657,957	-6,802	-10,609	392,649	676,761	907,675	928,035	904,217	440,263	812,520	948,929	7,596,472
2010	948,792	844,351	929,709	890,359	680,413	827,853	903,208	921,538	899,634	924,231	910,835	938,788	10,619,711
2011	937,494	834,829	876,861	436,568	-8,539	543,044	918,578	927,009	875,211	373,434	911,926	934,434	8,560,849
2012	941,442	886,315	795,538	373,434	932,521	619,344	914,450	869,909	875,608	926,623	911,517	926,405	9,973,106
2013	721,885	827,548	462,974	-7,203	404,866	620,070	928,048	916,126	777,536	940,124	901,938	947,510	8,441,422
2014	949,623	825,826	906,476	911,860	875,284	898,595	925,829	917,719	873,851	699,994	728,750	941,464	10,455,271
2015	933,301	789,395	200,060	133,474	943,412	902,981	934,710	936,036	892,341	948,465	922,161	946,509	9,482,845
2016	709,583	622,146	946,537	914,375	943,605	814,486	915,017	902,059	850,547	935,958	922,911	946,026	10,423,250
2017	889,629	730,056	81,611	799,786	854,715	900,496	922,662	924,360	901,953	938,167	921,095	947,846	9,812,376
2018	952,931	849,443	951,635	919,725	934,198	890,632	906,864	904,012	882,733	931,505	914,087	896,971	10,934,736
2019	809,277	556,333	177,752	670,859	941,856	841,553	780,669	747,528	859,887	939,869	923,556	923,963	9,173,102
2020	928,860	893,210	932,277	917,959	941,610	891,452	889,355	909,725	892,399	936,477	914,074	943,564	10,990,962
2021	892,962	731,469	134,313	643,595	940,469	886,554	917,399	891,878	897,857	935,011	919,089	913,272	9,703,868
2022	902,658	845,250	920,347	883,206	914,023	866,926	883,939	848,346	822,350	887,197	635,367	924,845	10,334,454
2023	406,723	365,497	-6,309	288,698	938,798	899,050	912,742	718,651	886,140	939,753	920,669	950,500	7,220,712
2024	937,405	890,427	940,755	910,393	609,327	869,592	896,591	899,839	887,950	932,956	908,315	895,313	10,578,863
2025	912,043	755,369	113,480	245,636	942,932	876,905	888,730	922,238	890,611	940,313	911,292	950,434	9,349,983
2026	950,394	854,951	932,450	901,517	932,284	833,240	864,037	898,191					--

== Surrounding population ==
The Nuclear Regulatory Commission defines two emergency planning zones around nuclear power plants: a plume exposure pathway zone with a radius of 10 miles (16 km), concerned primarily with exposure to, and inhalation of, airborne radioactive contamination, and an ingestion pathway zone of about 50 miles (80 km), concerned primarily with ingestion of food and liquid contaminated by radioactivity.

The 2010 U.S. population within 10 miles (16 km) of Perry was 83,410, an increase of 8 percent in a decade, according to an analysis of U.S. Census data for msnbc.com. The 2010 U.S. population within 50 miles (80 km) was 2,281,531, a decrease of 3.0 percent since 2000. Cities within 50 miles (80 km) include Cleveland (36 miles (58 km) to city center). Canadian population is not included in these figures.

== Seismic risk ==
The Nuclear Regulatory Commission's estimate of the risk each year of an earthquake intense enough to cause core damage to the reactor at Perry was 1 in 47,619, according to an NRC study published in August 2010.

== Security threats ==
At around 6:00pm EDT on April 7, 2021, the FBI's Cleveland Field Office tweeted that there was an ongoing security situation at the plant that necessitated a bomb squad. The following day, law enforcement disclosed that a 33-year-old Michigan man drove to the power plant and told plant security officers that there was a bomb in the trailer he was towing with his pickup truck. No bomb was found; the man was arrested.
