= North Perry, Ohio =

- Village
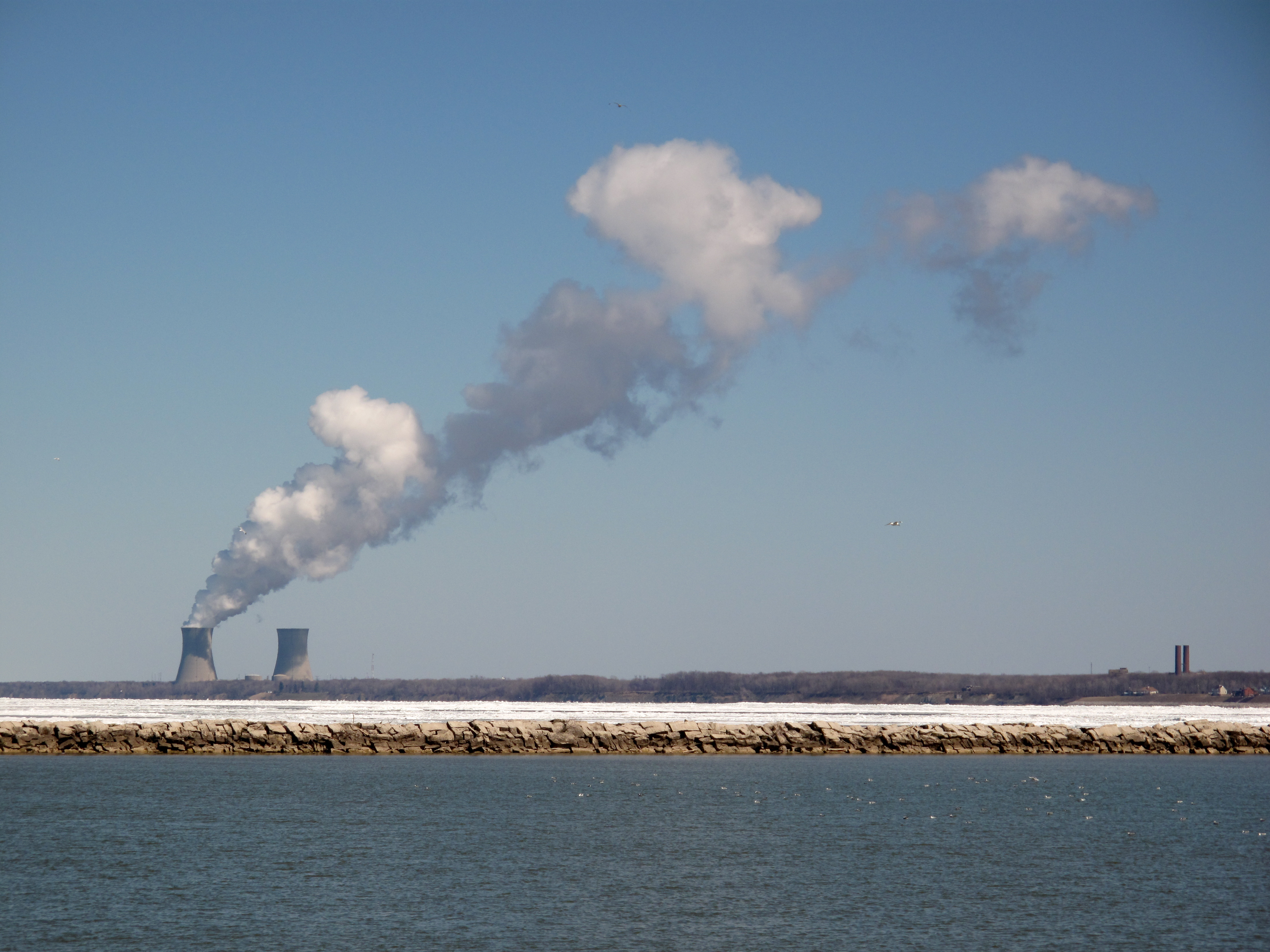
- Perry Nuclear Generating Station

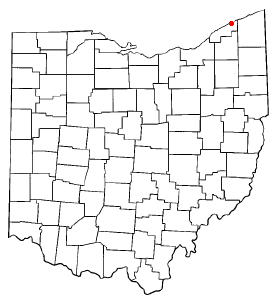
- Location of North Perry, Ohio

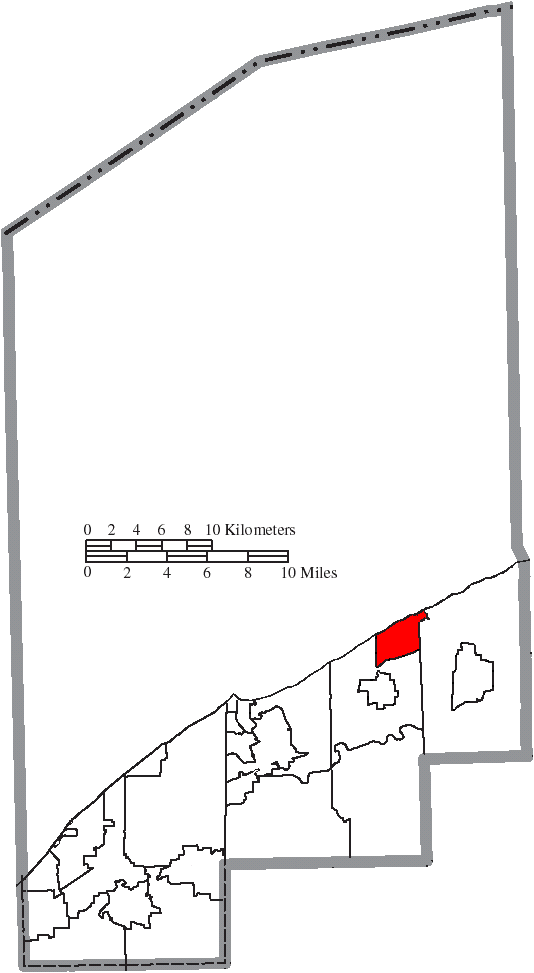
- Location of North Perry in Lake County
- Coordinates: 41°47′56″N 81°07′41″W
- Country: United States
- State: Ohio
- County: Lake
- Townships: Perry, Madison

Government
  - Mayor: Brian Titus (R)

Area
  - Total: 3.88 sq mi (10.05 km^{2})
  - Land: 3.88 sq mi (10.05 km^{2})
  - Water: 0 sq mi (0.00 km^{2})
- Elevation: 630 ft (190 m)

Population (2020)
  - Total: 915
  - Density: 235.9/sq mi (91.08/km^{2})
- Time zone: UTC-5 (Eastern (EST))
  - Summer (DST): UTC-4 (EDT)
- ZIP code: 44081
- Area code: 440
- FIPS code: 39-56910
- GNIS feature ID: 1086427
- Website: northperry.org

North Perry is a village in Lake County, Ohio, United States. The population was 915 at the 2020 census.

== Geography ==
North Perry is the site of the Perry Nuclear Generating Station.

According to the United States Census Bureau, the village has a total area of 3.87 square miles (10.02 km^{2}), all land.

== Demographics ==
Historical population
Census	Pop.	Note	%±
1930	316		—
1940	318		0.6%
1950	470		47.8%
1960	658		40.0%
1970	851		29.3%
1980	897		5.4%
1990	824		−8.1%
2000	838		1.7%
2010	893		6.6%
2020	915		2.5%
U.S. Decennial Census

=== 2010 census ===
As of the census of 2010, there were 893 people, 336 households, and 254 families residing in the village. The population density was 230.7 inhabitants per square mile (89.1/km^{2}). There were 353 housing units at an average density of 91.2 per square mile (35.2/km^{2}). The racial makeup of the village was 99.3% White, 0.2% Asian, 0.1% Pacific Islander, and 0.3% from two or more races. Hispanic or Latino of any race were 0.6% of the population.

There were 336 households, of which 34.2% had children under the age of 18 living with them, 61.3% were married couples living together, 10.7% had a female householder with no husband present, 3.6% had a male householder with no wife present, and 24.4% were non-families. 20.2% of all households were made up of individuals, and 8.7% had someone living alone who was 65 years of age or older. The average household size was 2.66 and the average family size was 3.07.

The median age in the village was 44.9 years. 24.7% of residents were under the age of 18; 6.5% were between the ages of 18 and 24; 18.8% were from 25 to 44; 36.1% were from 45 to 64; and 13.9% were 65 years of age or older. The gender makeup of the village was 51.6% male and 48.4% female.

=== 2000 census ===
As of the census of 2000, there were 838 people, 302 households, and 238 families residing in the village. The population density was 215.4 inhabitants per square mile (83.2/km^{2}). There were 316 housing units at an average density of 81.2 per square mile (31.4/km^{2}). The racial makeup of the village was 99.05% White, 0.24% African American, 0.12% Native American, 0.12% Asian, and 0.48% from two or more races. Hispanic or Latino of any race were 0.48% of the population. 24.1% were of German, 15.2% Irish, 11.7% English, 8.2% American and 6.8% Italian ancestry according to Census 2000.

There were 302 households, out of which 35.4% had children under the age of 18 living with them, 66.9% were married couples living together, 8.6% had a female householder with no husband present, and 20.9% were non-families. 17.9% of all households were made up of individuals, and 6.6% had someone living alone who was 65 years of age or older. The average household size was 2.77 and the average family size was 3.18.

In the village, the population was spread out, with 26.0% under the age of 18, 6.9% from 18 to 24, 25.7% from 25 to 44, 29.4% from 45 to 64, and 12.1% who were 65 years of age or older. The median age was 40 years. For every 100 females there were 98.6 males. For every 100 females age 18 and over, there were 95.6 males.

The median income for a household in the village was $47,708, and the median income for a family was $51,875. Males had a median income of $44,375 versus $25,000 for females. The per capita income for the village was $20,896. About 6.0% of families and 6.0% of the population were below the poverty line, including 7.4% of those under age 18 and 2.0% of those age 65 or over.
