= Buckeye Trail =

Long-distance hiking trail in the United States

- Length: 1,444 mi (2,324 km)
- Location: Ohio, USA
- Trailheads: Northern:Headlands Beach State Park; Southern:Eden Park, Cincinnati
- Use: Hiking, Backpacking
- Difficulty: Easy to strenuous
- Season: Any
- Sights: Hocking Hills, Ohio and Erie Canal, Miami and Erie Canal, Cuyahoga Valley National Park, Wayne National Forest
- Hazards: Severe weather Tick-borne diseases Mosquitos; Biting flies Chiggers; Steep grades Limited water Diarrhea from water Poison ivy Venomous snakes

The Buckeye Trail is a 1,444-mile (2,324 km) hiking trail and long-distance trail that loops around the state of Ohio. Part of it is on roads and part is on wooded trail. Road portions of the trail are gradually being relocated to separate trail.

This trail passes through many of the most scenic locations in the state, such as the Hocking Hills region and the Cuyahoga Valley National Park. It also goes through many small towns in Ohio, making this trail both an outdoor as well as a history experience.

The trail's northern terminus is on Lake Erie in Headlands Beach State Park east of Cleveland. From the northern terminus, one branch leads south down the eastern edge of the state while another leads west across the north towards Toledo.

The two branches rejoin in southwestern Ohio in the city of Milford, where a single branch continues southwest to Eden Park in Cincinnati, the southern terminus.

Major portions of the trail follow the old canal routes including the Miami and Erie Canal and the Wabash and Erie Canal in the West and the Ohio and Erie Canal in the East.

The North Country Trail coincides with the Buckeye Trail for a large part of its route, and the American Discovery Trail also coincides with it through southern Ohio.

The Buckeye Trail Association, a non-profit volunteer organization, maintains and develops the trail. The trail is identified by blue blazes, 2 by 6 inches (5.1 cm × 15.2 cm), on trees or poles. A single blaze marks the trail where the route is fairly straight or obvious, while a double blaze marks a turn with the upper blaze offset to indicate the new direction. A double blaze with no offset simply means pay attention - the trail route may not be obvious.

== Gallery ==
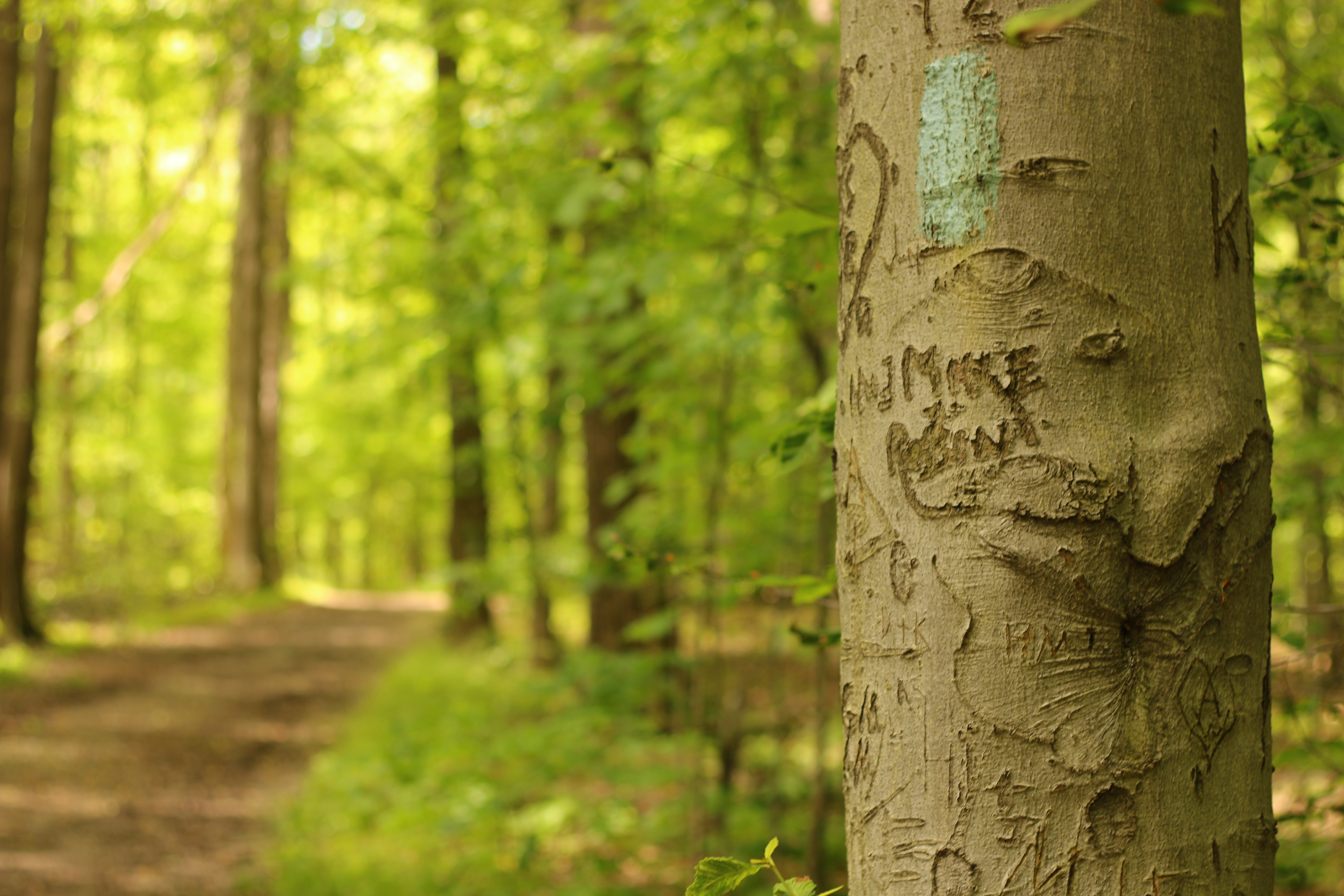
BT blaze on a beech tree in North Chagrin Metropark

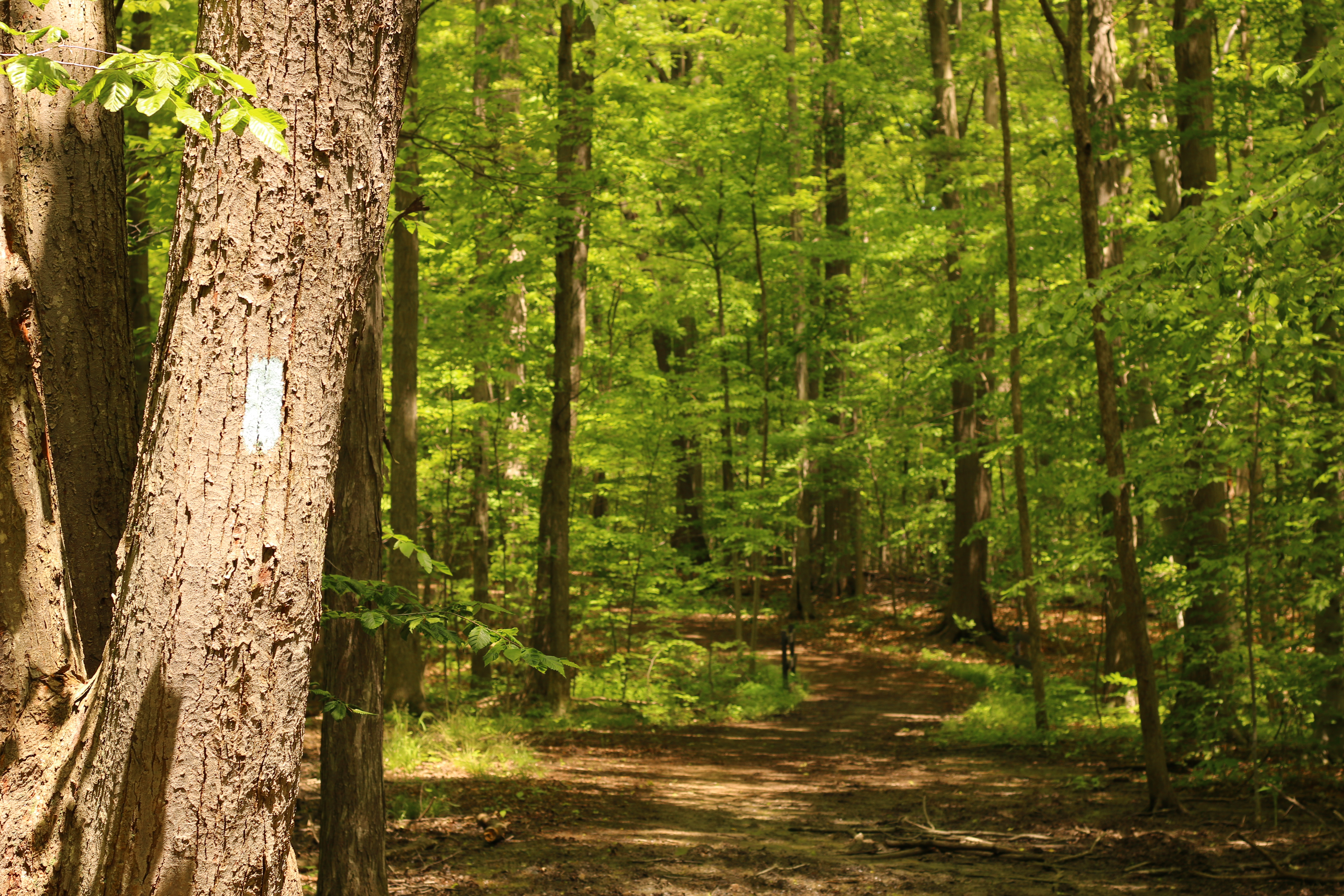
BT in North Chagrin Metropark

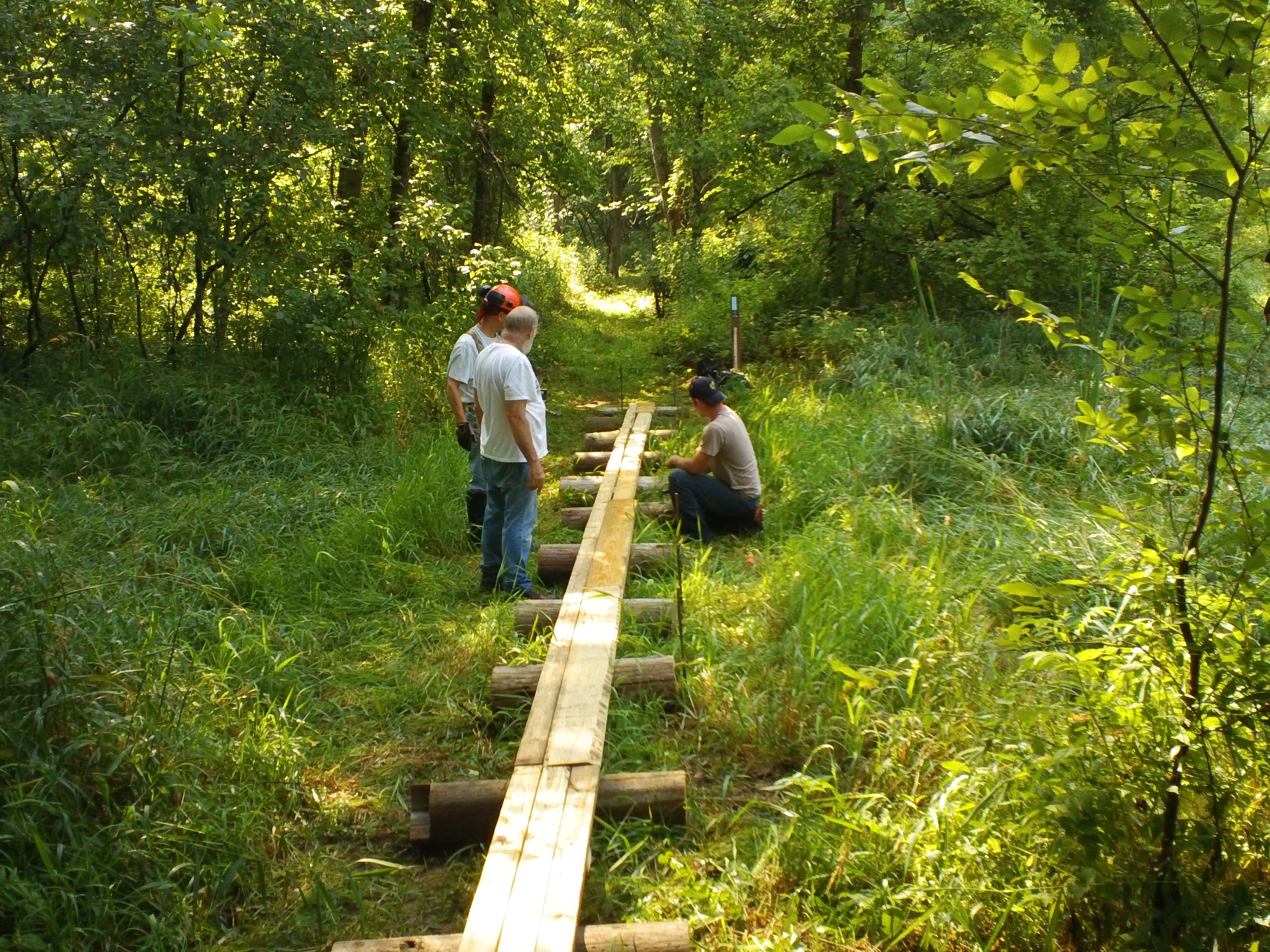
BTA Trail Crew installing new puncheon at Lake Logan State Park

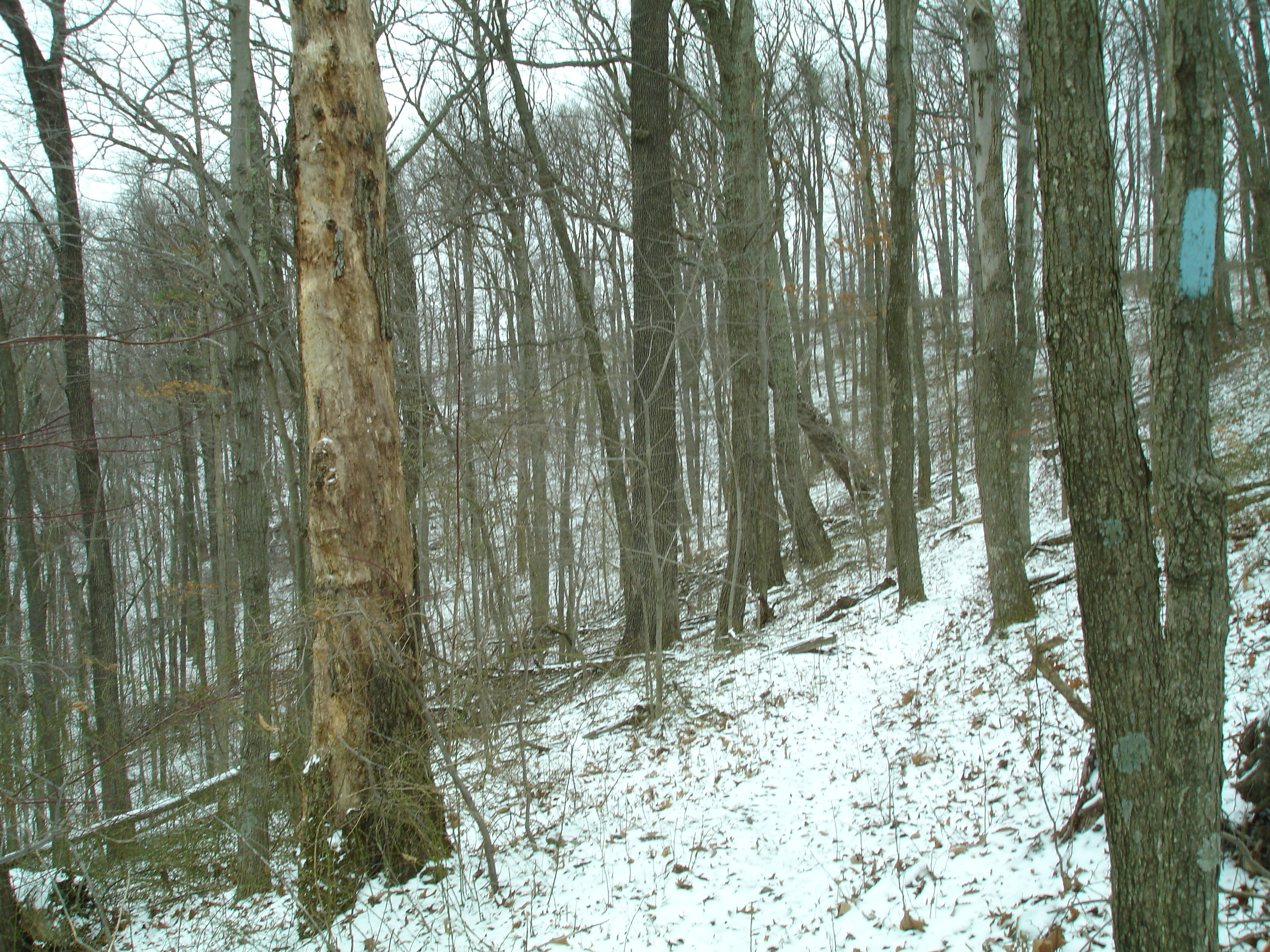
Winter View of the Trail in Tar Hollow State Forest

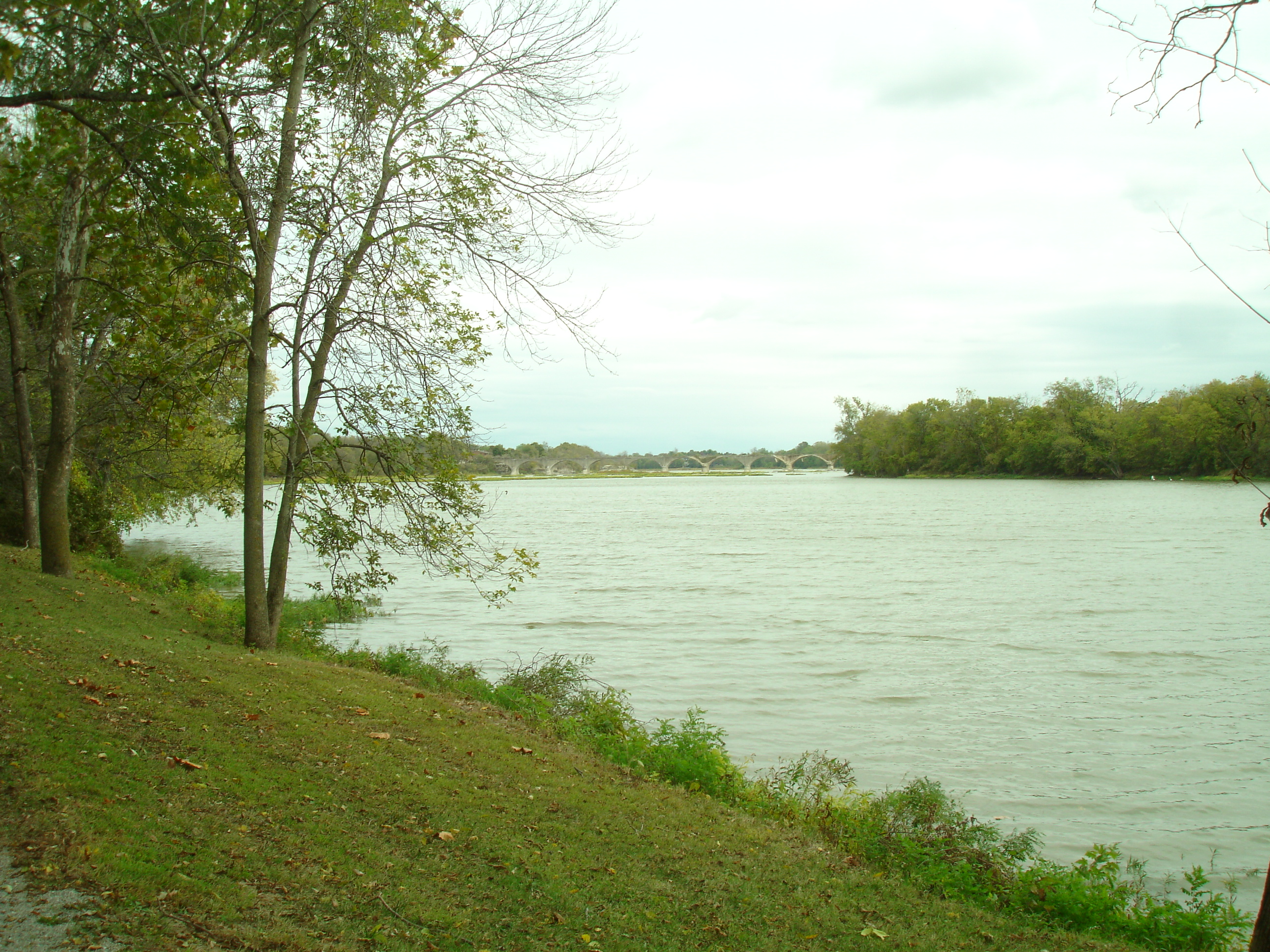
View of the Maumee River from along the trail at Bend View Metropark

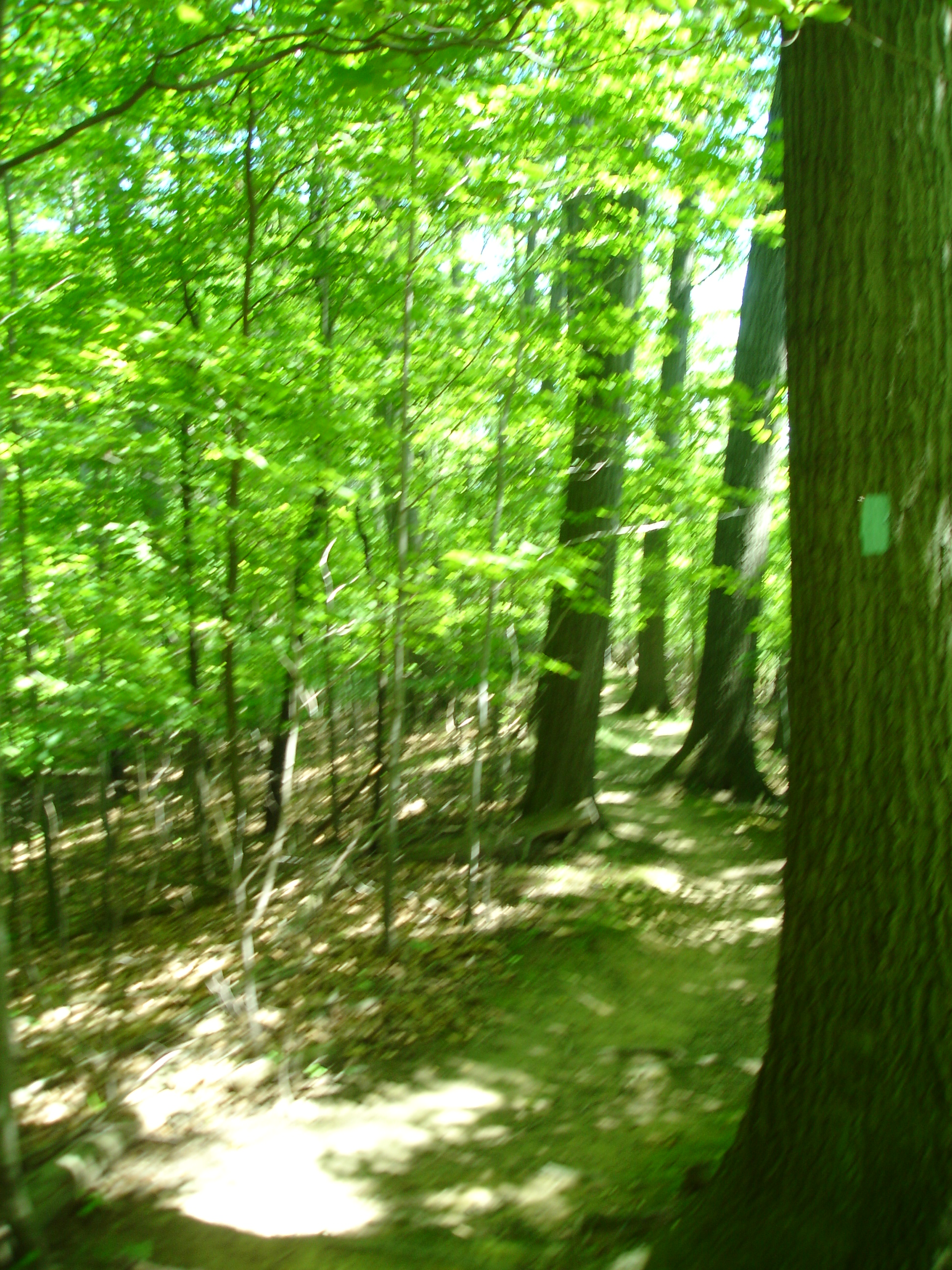
A typical BT blaze at Mentor Marsh State Nature Preserve

== See also ==
- Hocking Hills State Park
- Wayne National Forest
- Little Miami River
- Miami and Erie Canal
- Ohio to Erie Trail
