= Riverside High School (Painesville Township, Ohio) =

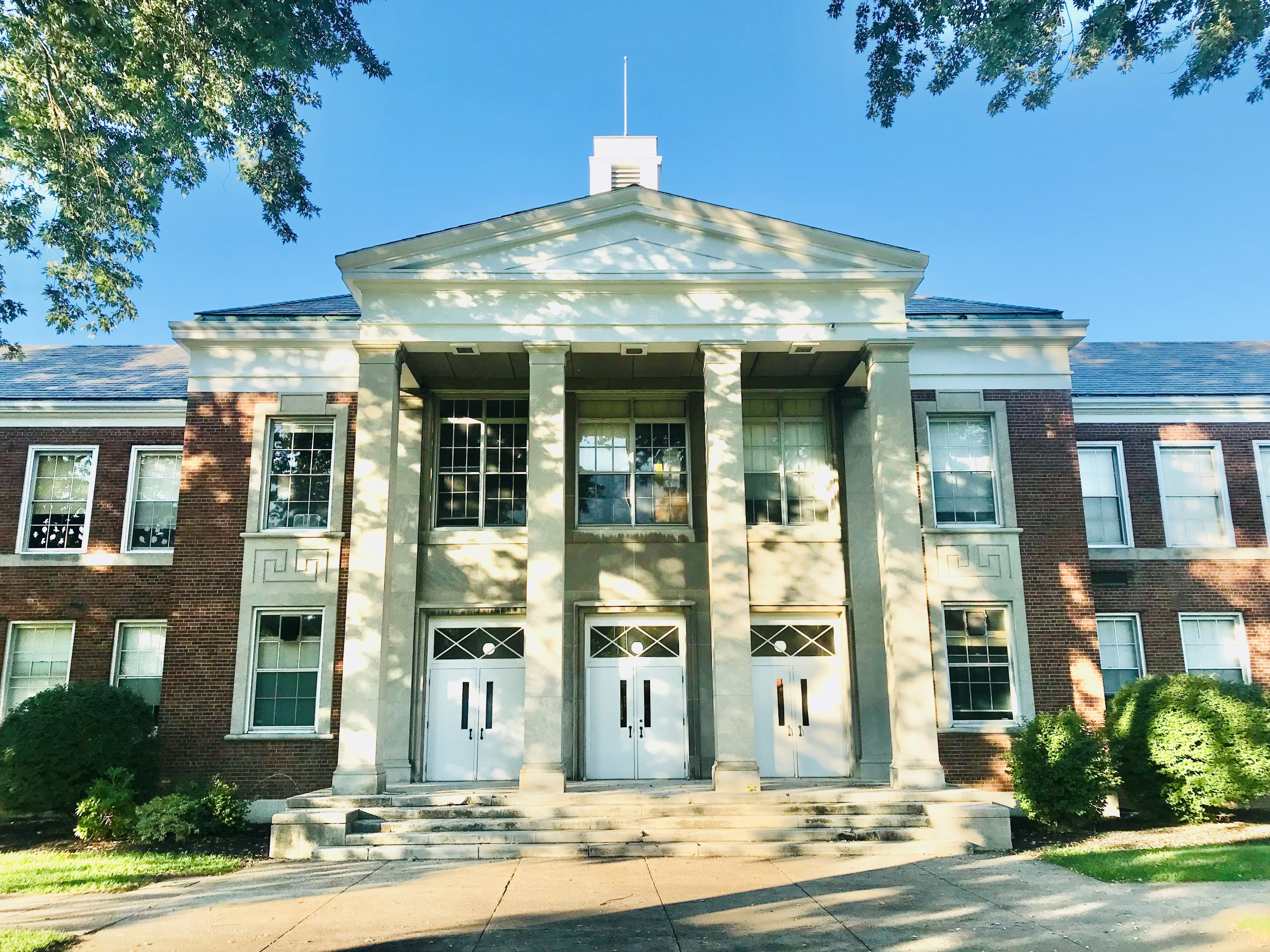

Location
- 585 Riverside Drive; Painesville Township, Ohio 44077; United States
- Coordinates: 41°42′45″N 81°13′7″W

Information
- Other name: RHS
- Type: Public high school
- School district: Riverside Local School District
- NCES School ID: 391001403033
- Principal: Mike Hall
- Teaching staff: 76.50 (on an FTE basis)
- Grades: 8–12
- Enrollment: 1,682 (2023-2024)
- Student to teacher ratio: 21.99
- Colors: Black and Gold
- Athletics conference: Greater Cleveland Conference
- Mascot: Beaver
- Nickname: Beavers
- Website: www.painesville-township.k12.oh.us

Riverside High School (RHS) is a public high school in Painesville Township, Ohio, United States. It is part of the Riverside Local School District.

== Logo infringement ==
In 2010, Oregon State University forced Riverside High School and the Riverside Local School District to change their Beaver mascot logo because of copyright concerns.

== Ohio High School Athletic Association State Championships ==
- Girls Softball – 2025

== Notable alumni ==
- Mike Celizic, author and columnist
- Dan O'Shannon, television writer and producer
- Scott Shafer, football coach
- Jason Short, NFL player
