= Painesville-on-the-Lake, Ohio =

Unincorporated community in Ohio, U.S.

Coordinates: 41°45′54″N 81°13′40″W

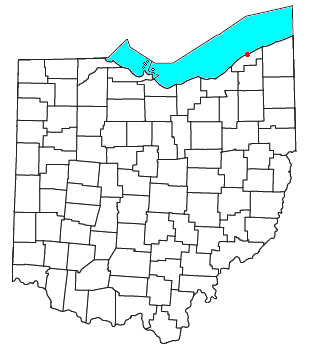
Location of Painesville-on-the-Lake, Ohio

Painesville-on-the-Lake is an unincorporated community in northern Painesville Township, Lake County, Ohio, United States. It lies along the shoreline of Lake Erie north of the county seat of Painesville. The short Hardy Road connects the community to State Route 535. The nearest major airport is Cleveland Hopkins International Airport.
