= South LeRoy Meetinghouse =

Historic church in Ohio, United States

- U.S. National Register of Historic Places
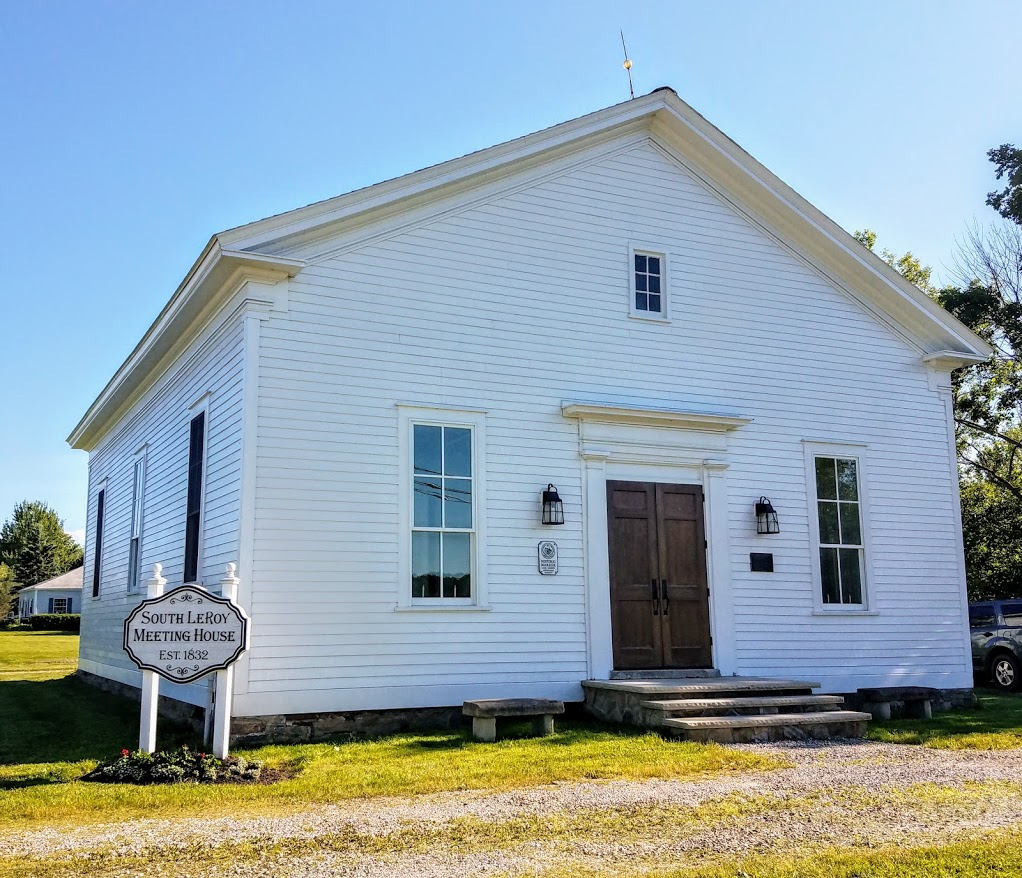
- Front, 2019

- Location within Ohio Location within the United States
- Nearest city: Painesville, Ohio
- Coordinates: 41°39′50″N 81°8′49″W
- Area: less than one acre
- Built: 1822
- NRHP reference No.: 79001873
- Added to NRHP: May 8, 1979

South LeRoy Meeting House (also known as SE LeRoy Methodist Episcopal Church or Brakeman Church) is a historic church in Leroy Township, Ohio The Greek Revival architecture church was started in 1822 and finished in 1832. Henry Brakeman and sons built the church from local lumber. It was placed on the National Register in 1979. As of the fall of 2015, the Leroy South Meetinghouse is undergoing renovations. The entire building has now been resided and painted.
