= Mike Celizic =

American author, reporter, and columnist (1948-2010)

Michael J. Celizic (August 18, 1948 – September 22, 2010) was an American author and columnist.

Celizic was born in Leroy Township, Ohio, and was a graduate of Painesville Riverside High School and the University of Notre Dame.

Celizic authored seven books, including The Biggest Game of Them All: Notre Dame, Michigan State and the Fall of 1966.

Celizic had been a reporter for the Home News Tribune of New Brunswick, New Jersey, and a sports columnist for The Record of Hackensack, New Jersey. He was also a columnist for msnbc.com for 13 years. He was known for a trademark look that always included a hat.

Celizic died of cancer, survived by a wife, Margaret, and four children. He had covered the treatment on his lymphoma in a journal for MSNBC up until his decision to forgo further chemotherapy treatments following an unfavorable diagnosis of the cancer's return from remission.
