= Davis–Besse Nuclear Power Station =

Nuclear power plant in Ottawa County, Ohio, United States

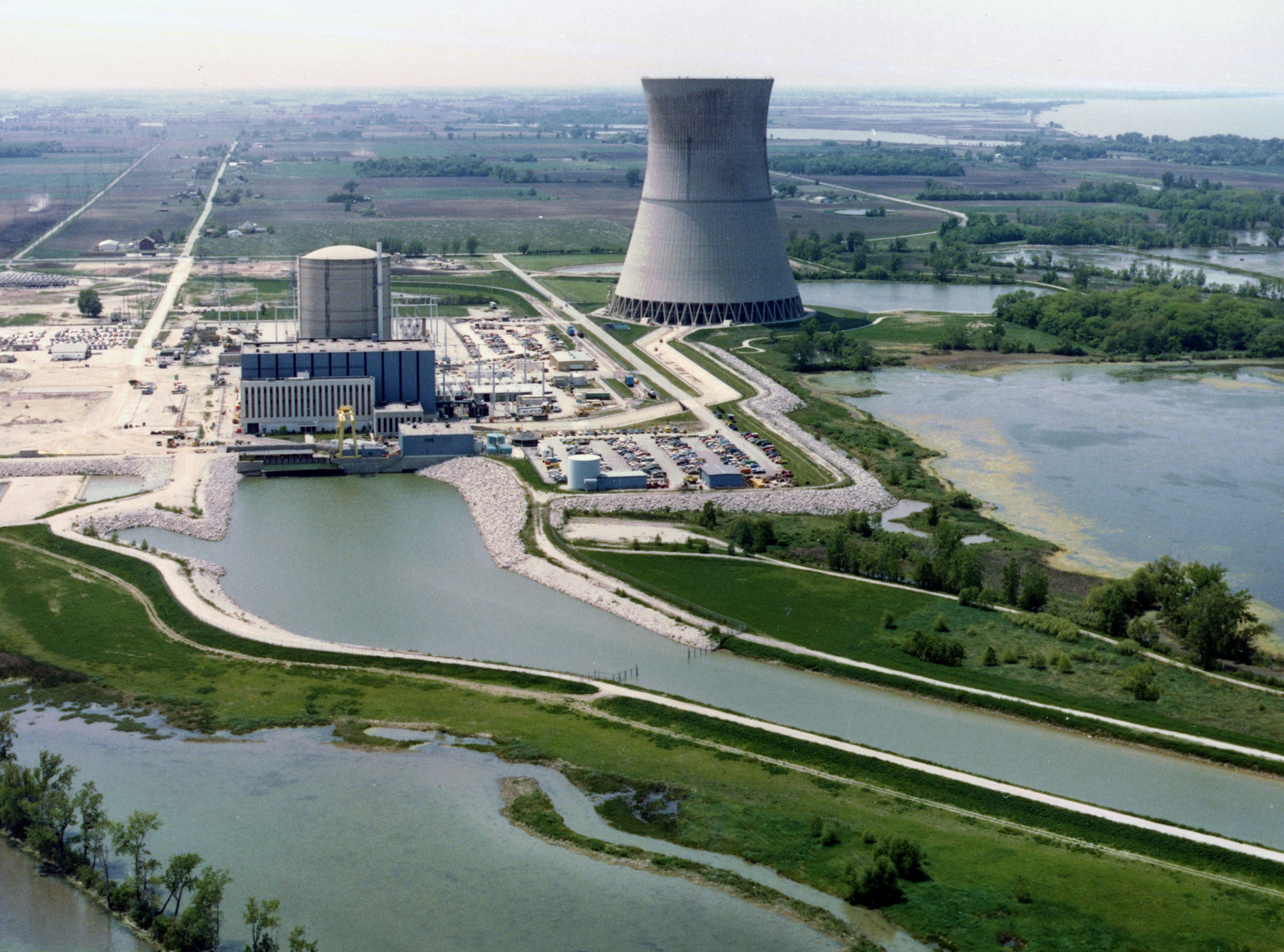
- The Davis–Besse NPP (NRC image)
- Country: United States
- Location: Carroll Township, Ottawa County, Ohio, near Oak Harbor
- Coordinates: 41°35′48″N 83°5′11″W
- Status: Operational
- Construction began: September 1, 1970
- Commission date: July 31, 1978
- Construction cost: $2.221 billion (2007 USD) ($3.32 billion in 2025 dollars)
- Owner: Vistra
- Operator: Vistra

Nuclear power station
- Reactor type: PWR
- Reactor supplier: Babcock & Wilcox
- Cooling towers: 1 × Natural Draft
- Cooling source: Lake Erie
- Thermal capacity: 1 × 2817 MW_{th}

Power generation
- Units operational: 1 × 894 MW
- Make and model: B&W RLP (DRYAMB)
- Units cancelled: 2 × 910 MW
- Nameplate capacity: 894 MW
- Capacity factor: 100.57% (2017); 70.70% (lifetime)
- Annual net output: 7779 GWh (2021)

External links
- Website: Davis-Besse
- Commons: Related media on Commons

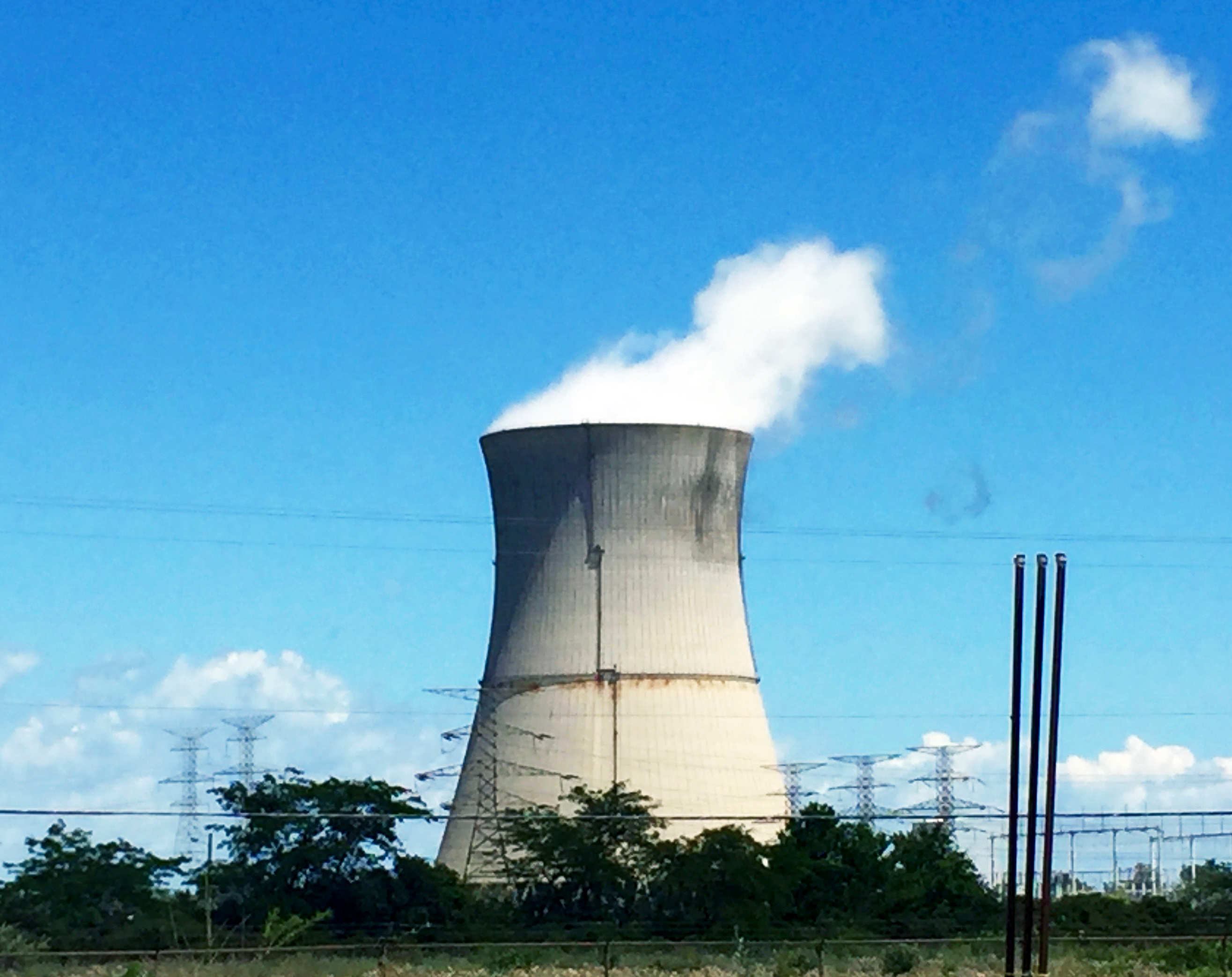
Davis–Besse Nuclear Power Station's cooling tower in July 2015

Davis–Besse Nuclear Power Station is an 894 megawatt (MW) nuclear power plant, located northeast of Oak Harbor, Ohio, United States. It has a single pressurized water reactor. Davis–Besse is operated by Vistra Corp.

Throughout its operation, Davis–Besse has been the site of several safety incidents that affected the plant's operation. According to the Nuclear Regulatory Commission (NRC), Davis–Besse has been the source of two of the top five most dangerous nuclear incidents in the United States since 1979. The most severe occurring in March 2002, when maintenance workers discovered corrosion had eaten a hole variously described as the size of a football or a pineapple into the reactor vessel head. The NRC kept Davis–Besse shut down until March 2004, so that FirstEnergy was able to perform all the necessary maintenance for safe operations. The NRC imposed an over $5 million fine, its largest fine ever to a nuclear power plant, against FirstEnergy for the actions that led to the corrosion. The company paid an additional $28 million in fines under a settlement with the United States Department of Justice (DOJ).

Davis–Besse was expected to close in 2020 as it is no longer profitable to run when competing against natural gas plants. Plans were updated indicating possible shut down by May 31, 2020. However, Ohio House Bill 6 was signed into law in July 2019 which added a fee to residents' utility bills that funded subsidies of $150 million per year to Davis–Besse and the Perry Nuclear Generating Station to keep both plants operational. The bill was alleged to be part of the Ohio nuclear bribery scandal revealed by the United States Department of Justice (DOJ) in July 2020.

== Location and history ==
The power station is located on the southwest shore of Lake Erie about 10 miles (16 km) north of Oak Harbor, Ohio and is on the north side of Highway 2 just east of Highway 19 on a 954-acre (386 ha) site in the Carroll Township. The plant only utilizes 221 acres (89 ha), with 733 acres (297 ha) devoted to the Ottawa National Wildlife Refuge. The entrance to Magee Marsh Wildlife Area is approximately 5 miles west of the power station. The official name according to the U.S. Energy Information Administration is the Davis–Besse Nuclear Generating Station. It is the 57th commercial power reactor to commence building in the United States of America (construction began on September 1, 1970) and the 50th to come on-line July 31, 1978. The plant was originally jointly owned by Cleveland Electric Illuminating (CEI) and Toledo Edison (TE) and was named for former TE Chairman John K. Davis and former CEI Chairman Ralph M. Besse.

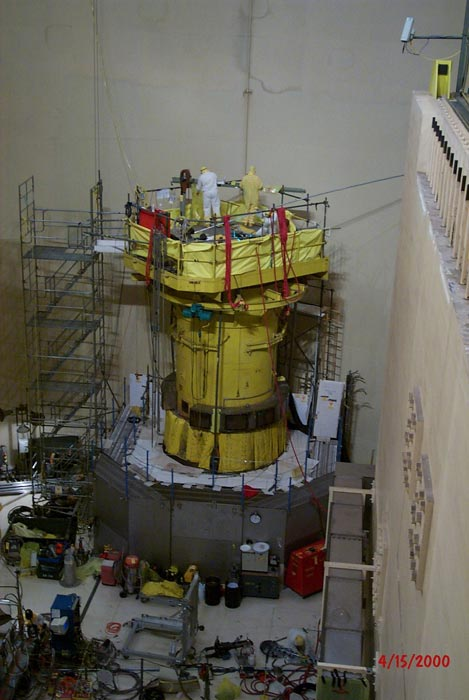
The reactor head under inspection

Unit One is an 879 MWe pressurized water reactor supplied by Babcock & Wilcox. The reactor was shut down from 2002 until early 2004 for safety repairs and upgrades. In 2012 the reactor supplied 7101.700 GWh of electricity.

In 1973, two more reactors were also ordered from Babcock & Wilcox. However, construction on Units Two and Three never commenced, and these two units were officially canceled in 1981.

== Electricity production ==
Generation (MWh) of Davis–Besse Nuclear Power Station
Year	Jan	Feb	Mar	Apr	May	Jun	Jul	Aug	Sep	Oct	Nov	Dec	Annual (Total)
2001	659,778	601,935	655,630	634,920	658,726	633,332	648,532	655,159	637,346	624,363	615,007	659,590	7,684,318
2002	664,299	257,171	-4,123	-4,136	-3,264	-3,616	-3,665	-1,052	-2,868	-2,879	-2,910	-2,865	890,092
2003	-3,229	-3,011	-3,515	-3,314	-4,344	-4,228	-7,123	-4,102	-18,422	-5,997	-3,193	-9,682	-70,160
2004	-22,203	-24,463	48,988	616,820	654,538	635,521	656,635	550,253	636,241	662,232	644,274	663,959	5,722,795
2005	333,513	395,132	669,279	640,760	661,392	635,065	647,321	651,779	633,822	591,221	632,360	664,441	7,156,085
2006	663,170	593,863	95,136	20,897	641,900	625,721	662,730	662,215	574,727	672,039	489,047	670,121	6,371,566
2007	668,923	601,820	639,963	643,498	630,043	640,493	661,833	658,993	629,766	663,599	646,539	620,332	7,705,802
2008	-6,155	297,934	662,611	637,980	668,821	631,100	667,935	674,678	654,173	682,609	662,497	589,102	6,823,285
2009	684,652	617,619	680,913	264,381	679,928	652,887	675,845	674,620	654,194	681,912	659,961	682,700	7,609,612
2010	681,476	561,079	-952	-1,365	-754	17,204	669,076	672,403	654,037	679,747	569,433	683,708	5,185,092
2011	530,909	608,350	679,484	649,596	674,584	650,651	669,594	670,660	645,742	-1,655	-1,643	552,625	6,328,897
2012	682,506	640,509	676,545	657,443	111,026	368,266	671,108	674,097	654,386	678,297	621,933	677,776	7,113,892
2013	680,984	615,339	681,159	658,601	676,769	627,419	399,908	672,379	652,538	676,252	658,784	679,696	7,679,828
2014	664,720	-1,310	-1,933	-2,049	488,603	652,873	675,643	674,824	655,160	680,229	660,600	681,809	5,829,169
2015	682,138	615,646	679,650	657,153	592,037	653,796	674,575	675,160	642,915	679,625	658,375	682,821	7,893,891
2016	627,509	544,477	417,821	-752	457,391	646,852	667,664	666,426	370,218	659,647	658,798	678,085	6,394,136
2017	678,210	587,017	675,612	654,031	672,376	609,098	669,451	670,979	650,244	674,261	656,854	677,280	7,875,413
2018	677,499	587,101	110,504	658,777	677,003	652,759	672,925	671,524	651,877	678,299	660,812	681,191	7,380,271
2019	618,699	615,242	680,076	657,639	677,666	653,008	671,001	673,169	572,934	677,455	659,759	680,811	7,837,459
2020	662,767	497,614	80,585	644,305	677,539	650,290	669,007	671,791	653,716	679,261	660,108	681,080	7,228,063
2021	682,989	617,369	679,866	655,488	672,213	650,332	585,691	650,390	651,170	665,185	658,172	610,276	7,779,141
2022	680,675	505,835	64,192	237,329	659,465	651,990	671,667	670,635	652,660	678,774	659,119	359,992	6,492,333
2023	681,308	616,035	682,419	658,746	678,165	652,624	672,339	672,860	653,155	678,292	659,495	680,290	7,985,728
2024	680,082	636,547	73,343	651,301	674,438	649,154	669,754	670,168	650,562	675,560	657,241	679,973	7,368,123
2025	679,610	613,535	676,274	654,182	675,447	648,877	667,431	518,967	649,305	674,466	655,994	677,787	7,791,875
2026	677,685	596,970	-158	644,851	673,501	647,827	666,709	668,226					--

== Incident history ==
=== 1977 first stuck-open pilot-operated relief valve ===
On September 24, 1977, the relief valve for the reactor pressurizer failed to close when the reactor, running at only 9% power, shut down because of a disruption in the feedwater system.

This incident later became a precursor to the Three Mile Island accident, in which a pilot-operated relief valve also became stuck open, leaking thousands of gallons of coolant water into the basement of the reactor building.

=== 1985 loss of feedwater event ===
On June 9, 1985, the main feedwater pumps, used to supply water to the reactor steam generators, shut down. A control room operator then attempted to start the auxiliary (emergency) feedwater pumps. These pumps both tripped on overspeed conditions because of operator error. This incident was originally classified an "NRC Unusual Event" (the lowest classification the NRC uses) but it was later determined that it should have been classified a "site area emergency".

=== 1998 tornado ===
On June 24, 1998, the station was struck by an F2 tornado. The plant's switchyard was damaged and access to external power was disabled. The plant's reactor automatically shut down at 8:42 pm and an alert (the next to lowest of four levels of severity) was declared at 9:18 pm. The plant's emergency diesel generators powered critical facility safety systems until external power could be restored.

=== 2002 reactor head hole ===
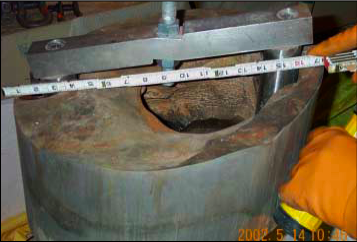
Erosion of the 6-inch-thick (150 mm) carbon steel reactor head, caused by a persistent leak of borated water

In March 2002, plant staff discovered that the borated water that serves as the reactor coolant had leaked from cracked control rod drive mechanisms directly above the reactor and eaten through more than six inches (150 mm) of the carbon steel reactor pressure vessel head over an area roughly the size of a football (see photo). This significant reactor head wastage on the exterior of the reactor vessel head left only 3/8 inch (9.5 mm) of stainless steel cladding holding back the high-pressure (~2155 psi, 14.6 MPa) reactor coolant. A breach most likely would have resulted in a massive loss-of-coolant accident, in which reactor coolant would have jetted into the reactor's containment building and resulted in emergency safety procedures to protect from core damage or meltdown. Because of the location of the reactor head damage, such a jet of reactor coolant might have damaged adjacent control rod drive mechanisms, hampering or preventing reactor shut-down. As part of the system reviews following the accident, significant safety issues were identified with other critical plant components, including the following:

1. the containment sump that allows the reactor coolant to be reclaimed and reinjected into the reactor;
2. the high pressure injection pumps that would reinject such reclaimed reactor coolant;
3. the emergency diesel generator system;
4. the containment air coolers that would remove heat from the containment building;
5. reactor coolant isolation valves; and
6. the plant's electrical distribution system.

The resulting corrective operational and system reviews and engineering changes took two years. Repairs and upgrades cost $600 million, and the Davis–Besse reactor was restarted in March 2004. To replace the reactor vessel head, FirstEnergy purchased one from the mothballed Midland Nuclear Power Plant in Midland, Michigan.

The NRC determined that this incident was the fifth-most dangerous nuclear incident in the United States since 1979, and imposed its largest fine ever—more than $5 million—against FirstEnergy for the actions that led to the corrosion.

==== Criminal prosecutions ====
In January 2006, First Energy, the owner of Davis–Besse, acknowledged a series of safety violations by former workers, and entered into a deferred prosecution agreement with the United States Department of Justice (DOJ). The deferred prosecution agreement related to the March 2002 incident. The deferment granted by the NRC were based on letters from Davis–Besse engineers stating that previous inspections were adequate. However, those inspections were not as thorough as the company suggested, as proved by the material deficiency discovered later. In any case, because FirstEnergy cooperated with investigators on the matter, they were able to avoid more serious penalties. The company paid $28 million under a settlement with the Justice Department. $23.7 million of that were fines, with an additional $4.3 million to be contributed to various groups, including the National Park Service, the U.S. Fish and Wildlife Service, Habitat for Humanity, and the University of Toledo as well as to pay some costs related to the federal investigation.

Two former employees and one former contractor were indicted for statements made in multiple documents and one videotape, over several years, for hiding evidence that the reactor pressure vessel was being corroded by boric acid. The maximum penalty for the three was 25 years in prison. The indictment mentions that other employees also provided false information to inspectors, but does not name them. In 2007, one of these men was convicted and another acquitted of hiding information from and lying to the NRC. Another jury trial in 2008 convicted the remaining engineer of similar crimes.

=== 2003 slammer worm computer virus ===
In January 2003, the plant's private network became infected with the slammer worm, which resulted in a five-hour loss of safety monitoring at the plant.

=== 2008 discovery of tritium leak ===
The NRC and Ohio Environmental Protection Agency (Ohio EPA) were notified of a tritium leak accidentally discovered during an unrelated fire inspection on October 22, 2008. Preliminary indications suggest radioactive water did not infiltrate groundwater outside plant boundaries.

=== 2010 replacement reactor head problems ===
During a scheduled refueling outage in 2010, ultrasonic examinations performed on the control rod drive mechanism nozzles penetrating the reactor vessel closure head identified that two of the nozzles inspected did not meet acceptance criteria. FirstEnergy investigators subsequently found new cracks in 24 of 69 nozzles, including one serious enough to leak boric acid. Crack indications required repair prior to returning the vessel head to service. Control rod drive nozzles were repaired using techniques proven at other nuclear facilities. The plant resumed operation in 2010. The existing reactor vessel head was scheduled for replacement in 2011.

=== 2011 shield building cracks ===
An October 2011 shutdown of the plant for maintenance revealed a 30 foot long hairline crack in the concrete shield building around the containment vessel.

=== 2012 reactor coolant pump seal pinhole leak ===
On June 6, 2012, an approximately 0.1 gpm pinhole spray leakage was identified from a weld in a seal of the reactor coolant pump during a routine reactor coolant system walkdown inspection. The plant entered limited operations, and root cause analysis was undertaken.

=== 2015 steam leak shutdown ===
On May 9, 2015, a steam leak in the turbine building caused FirstEnergy operators to declare an 'Unusual Event' and shut the reactor down until repairs could be made. The plant was brought back online and synchronized with the local power grid 3 days later on May 12 after repairs were completed.

== Future ==
The facility's original nuclear operating license was set to expire on April 22, 2017. In August 2006, FirstEnergy Nuclear Operating Company (FENOC) submitted a letter of intent to renew. The submission date for the application was August 10, 2010. On December 8, 2015, the NRC granted a 20-year license extension to expire on April 22, 2037. On March 31, 2018, FirstEnergy Nuclear Operating Company filed for Bankruptcy protection. Around that time, the company indicated it would close the nuclear plant. In 2019, Ohio lawmakers debated a $9/MWh subsidy to keep Davis–Besse open. House Bill 6 was signed into law on July 23, 2019, and FirstEnergy announced it would refuel Davis–Besse and rescind its deactivation notice on July 24, 2019. It was later learned that the bill itself was a part of a public corruption scheme revealed by the Justice Department in July 2020.

The scheme involved FirstEnergy paying approximately $61 million to the Speaker of the Ohio House of Representatives, Larry Householder, and Matt Borges, Neil Clark, Juan Cespedes and Jeff Longstreth. For this, they were supposed to help pass the bill subsidizing the nuclear plant and prevent its repeal. Householder was found guilty, removed from the Ohio House and sentenced to 20 years in prison. Clark committed suicide.

== Seismic risk ==
The Nuclear Regulatory Commission's estimate of the risk each year of an earthquake intense enough to cause core damage to the reactor at Davis–Besse was 1 in 149,254, according to an NRC study published in August 2010.

== Surrounding population ==
The Nuclear Regulatory Commission defines two emergency planning zones around nuclear power plants: a plume exposure pathway zone with a radius of 10 miles (16 km), concerned primarily with exposure to, and inhalation of, airborne radioactive contamination, and an ingestion pathway zone of about 50 miles (80 km), concerned primarily with ingestion of food and liquid contaminated by radioactivity.

The 2010 U.S. population within 10 miles (16 km) of Davis–Besse was 18,635, an increase of 14.2 percent in a decade, according to an analysis of U.S. Census data for msnbc.com. The 2010 U.S. population within 50 miles (80 km) was 1,791,856, an increase of 1.4 percent since 2000. Cities within 50 miles (80 km) include Sandusky, Ohio, 22 miles (35 km); Toledo, Ohio 26 miles (42 km); and Detroit, Michigan, 50 miles (80 km) (distance to the city centers).

== See also ==
- Nuclear reactor accidents in the United States
- Pilot-operated relief valve
