= Interstate 90 Grand River bridges =

- Coordinates: 41°44′07″N 81°06′15″W
- Carries: I-90
- Crosses: Grand River
- Locale: Lake County, Ohio
- Official name: Specialist Jacob A. Ashton Memorial Bridge
- Preceded by: Two cantilever truss bridges

Characteristics
- Material: Steel girder

Location
- Interactive map of Interstate 90 Grand River bridges

The Interstate 90 Grand River bridges, officially the Specialist Jacob A. Ashton Memorial Bridge, are two steel girder bridges in Lake County, Ohio, on the Leroy Township–Perry Township boundary southwest of Madison, carrying Interstate 90 (I-90) over the Grand River.

== Former bridges ==
The I-90 bridges replace two cantilever truss bridges at the same location. Built in 1960, they were 869 feet (265 m) in length and 150 feet (46 m) in height.

On May 24, 1996, a gusset plate failed on the eastbound span, similar to the later failure on the I-35W Mississippi River bridge in Minneapolis, Minnesota in 2007, prompting the Ohio Department of Transportation to close the bridge later that day and divert traffic; the cause originally was attributed to an overloaded semi-trailer truck. The detour followed the State Route 44 and State Route 2 freeways, U.S. Route 20, and State Route 528, the latter which traverses downtown Madison. With the roads near the east end of the detour not equipped to carry the increased traffic, police officers from the village of Madison were dispatched to three intersections for traffic control. The detour lasted until the following month, when highway crossovers on each side of the damaged bridge permitted eastbound traffic to use the westbound span with westbound traffic. The eastbound span was repaired throughout the rest of the year and reopened on November 4.

In a project authorized in 2002 and lasting from March 2007 to July 2010, the old bridges were demolished. The eastbound span was demolished starting September 28, 2008, allowing the new westbound span to be built in its place, and the old westbound span was demolished beginning in late 2009 and finishing the morning of February 14, 2010.
