= Perry Township, Lake County, Ohio =

Township in Ohio, US

- Township
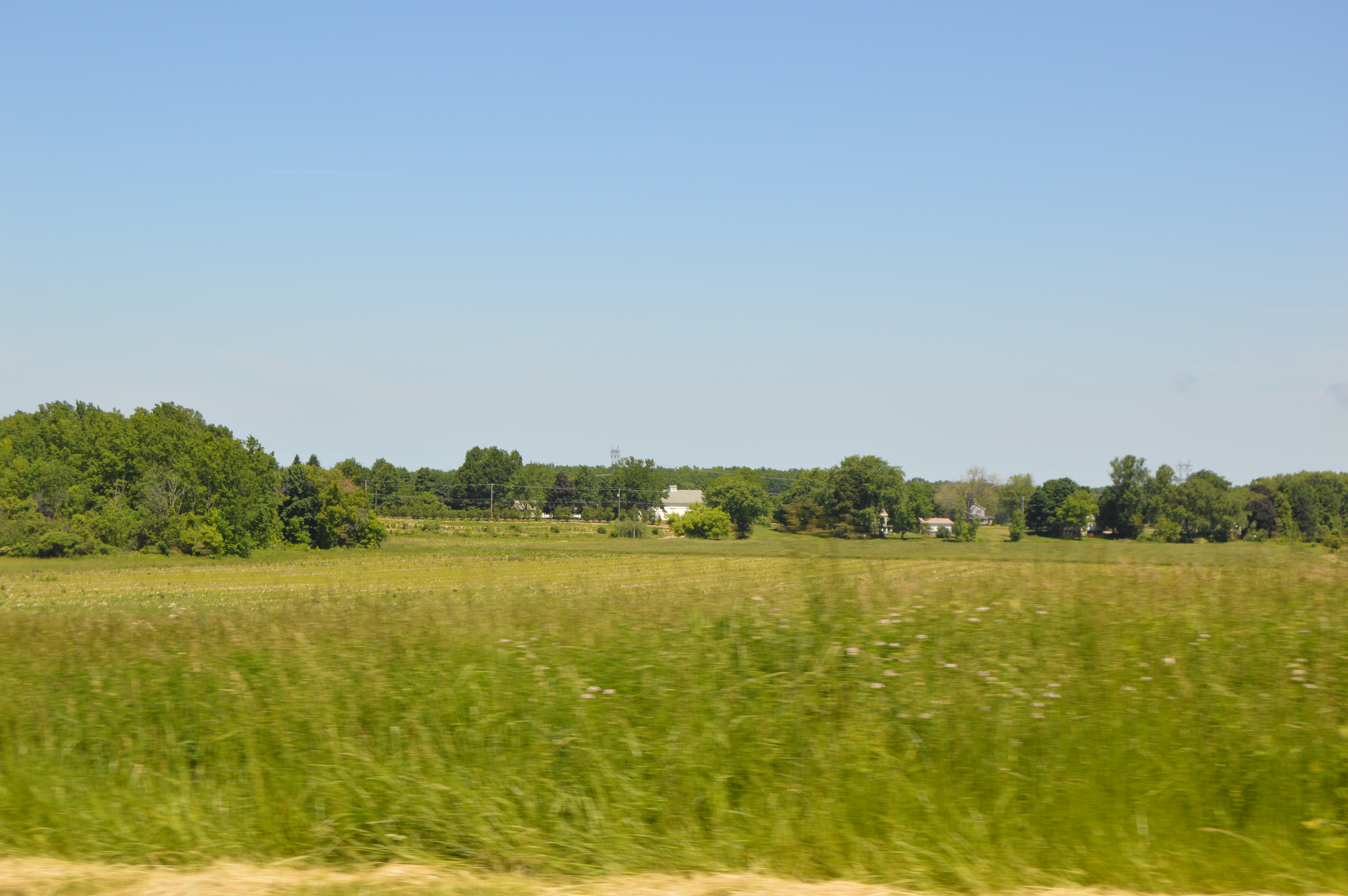
- Fields along River Road

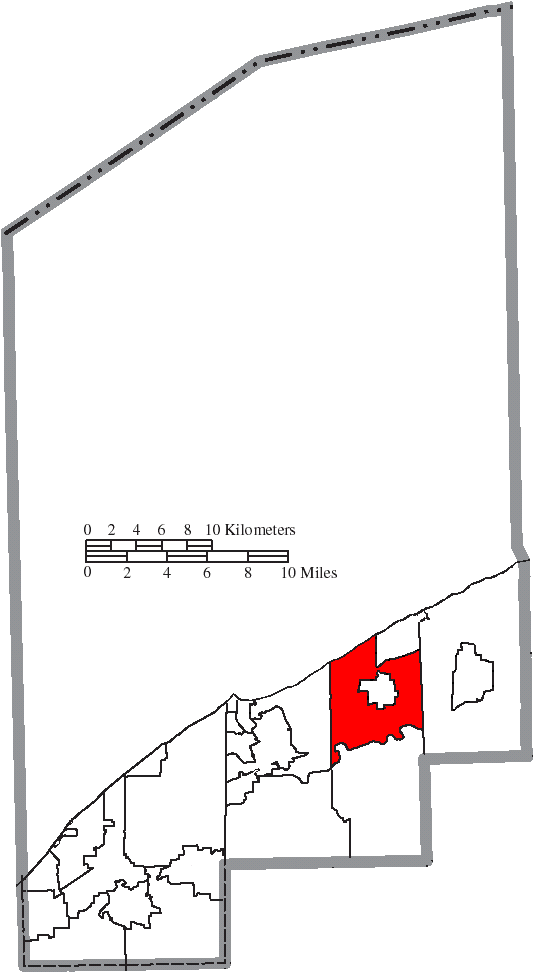
- Location of Perry Township in Lake County
- Coordinates: 41°45′27″N 81°8′58″W
- Country: United States
- State: Ohio
- County: Lake

Area
  - Total: 151.8 sq mi (393.1 km^{2})
  - Land: 23.3 sq mi (60.4 km^{2})
  - Water: 128.5 sq mi (332.7 km^{2})
- Elevation: 696 ft (212 m)

Population (2020)
  - Total: 8,862
  - Density: 380/sq mi (147/km^{2})
- Time zone: UTC-5 (Eastern (EST))
  - Summer (DST): UTC-4 (EDT)
- ZIP code: 44081
- Area code: 440
- FIPS code: 39-61896
- GNIS feature ID: 1086430
- Website: perrytownship-lake.com

Perry Township is one of the five townships of Lake County, Ohio, United States. As of the 2020 census the population was 8,862.

== Geography ==
Located in the northeastern part of the county along Lake Erie, it borders the following townships:

- Madison Township - east
- LeRoy Township - south
- Concord Township - southwest corner
- Painesville Township - west

Two villages are located in Perry Township: Perry in the center, and most of North Perry in the northeast along the lakeshore.

According to the U.S. Census Bureau, the township has a total area of 151.8 square miles (393.1 km^{2}), of which 23.3 square miles (60.4 km^{2}) are land and 128.5 square miles (332.7 km^{2}), or 84.6%, are water. The township boundaries extend north to the center of Lake Erie and the Canadian border.

== Name and history ==
It is one of 26 Perry Townships statewide.

The township was named to honor Oliver Hazard Perry, hero of the battle of Lake Erie.

== Government ==
The township is governed by a three-member board of trustees, who are elected in November of odd-numbered years to a four-year term beginning on the following January 1. Two are elected in the year after the presidential election and one is elected in the year before it. There is also an elected township fiscal officer, who serves a four-year term beginning on April 1 of the year after the election, which is held in November of the year before the presidential election. Vacancies in the fiscal officership or on the board of trustees are filled by the remaining trustees.

== See also ==
- Interstate 90 Grand River bridges
