= Grand River, Ohio =

- Village
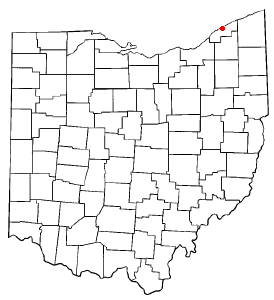
- Location of Grand River, Ohio

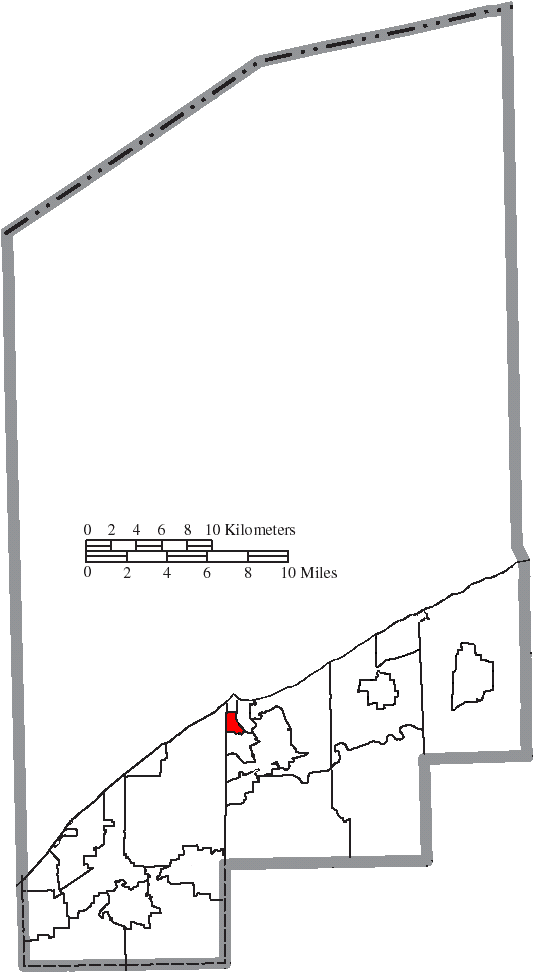
- Location of Grand River in Lake County
- Coordinates: 41°44′45″N 81°17′08″W
- Country: United States
- State: Ohio
- County: Lake
- Township: Painesville

Government
  - Type: Mayor–council government
  - Mayor: Jennifer Hood (R)

Area
  - Total: 0.64 sq mi (1.65 km^{2})
  - Land: 0.59 sq mi (1.52 km^{2})
  - Water: 0.050 sq mi (0.13 km^{2})
- Elevation: 600 ft (180 m)

Population (2020)
  - Total: 394
  - Estimate (2023): 394
  - Density: 671/sq mi (259.1/km^{2})
- Time zone: UTC-5 (Eastern (EST))
  - Summer (DST): UTC-4 (EDT)
- ZIP code: 44045
- Area code: 440
- FIPS code: 39-31234
- GNIS feature ID: 1086418
- Website: www.grandriverohio.gov

Grand River is a village in Lake County, Ohio, United States, along the Grand River. The population was 394 at the 2020 census.

== History ==
A post office called Grand River has been in operation since 1890. The village was named after the nearby Grand River.

== Geography ==
According to the United States Census Bureau, the village has a total area of 0.63 square miles (1.63 km^{2}), of which 0.54 square miles (1.40 km^{2}) are land and 0.09 square miles (0.23 km^{2}) are water.

Headlands Beach State Park lies adjacent to the village.

== Demographics ==
Historical population
Census	Pop.	Note	%±
1900	332		—
1910	203		−38.9%
1920	248		22.2%
1930	314		26.6%
1940	305		−2.9%
1950	448		46.9%
1960	477		6.5%
1970	613		28.5%
1980	412		−32.8%
1990	297		−27.9%
2000	345		16.2%
2010	399		15.7%
2020	394		−1.3%
2023 (est.)	394	Steady	0.0%
U.S. Decennial Census

=== 2010 census ===
At the 2010 census there were 399 people, 159 households, and 105 families in the village. The population density was 738.9 inhabitants per square mile (285.3/km^{2}). There were 176 housing units at an average density of 325.9 per square mile (125.8/km^{2}). The racial makeup of the village was 96.7% White, 1.5% African American, 1.3% from other races, and 0.5% from two or more races. Hispanic or Latino of any race were 4.5%.

Of the 159 households 29.6% had children under the age of 18 living with them, 50.9% were married couples living together, 11.3% had a female householder with no husband present, 3.8% had a male householder with no wife present, and 34.0% were non-families. 24.5% of households were one person and 6.9% were one person aged 65 or older. The average household size was 2.51 and the average family size was 3.02.

The median age in the village was 43.8 years. 21.1% of residents were under the age of 18; 9.8% were between the ages of 18 and 24; 21.6% were from 25 to 44; 33.9% were from 45 to 64; and 13.8% were 65 or older. The gender makeup of the village was 51.6% male and 48.4% female.

=== 2000 census ===
At the 2000 census there were 345 people, 122 households, and 96 families in the village. The population density was 627.1 inhabitants per square mile (242.1/km^{2}). There were 125 housing units at an average density of 227.2 per square mile (87.7/km^{2}). The racial makeup of the village was 99.42% White and 0.58% Asian. Hispanic or Latino of any race were 0.29%. 26.1% were of German, 13.7% English, 12.4% American, 8.5% Irish, 8.2% Italian, 6.5% Hungarian and 6.5% Polish ancestry according to Census 2000.

Of the 122 households 33.6% had children under the age of 18 living with them, 68.0% were married couples living together, 2.5% had a female householder with no husband present, and 21.3% were non-families. 18.9% of households were one person and 7.4% were one person aged 65 or older. The average household size was 2.83 and the average family size was 3.24.

The age distribution was 24.6% under the age of 18, 10.1% from 18 to 24, 30.7% from 25 to 44, 21.4% from 45 to 64, and 13.0% 65 or older. The median age was 38 years. For every 100 females there were 106.6 males. For every 100 females age 18 and over, there were 103.1 males.

The median household income was $45,000 and the median family income was $50,469. Males had a median income of $39,063 versus $28,000 for females. The per capita income for the village was $17,217. About 4.1% of families and 5.9% of the population were below the poverty line, including 9.5% of those under age 18 and none of those age 65 or over.

== Government ==
Grand River village has an elected mayor-council form of government.

== Education ==
Public education in the village is provided by the Riverside Local School District.

== Notable people ==
- Don Shula, former professional football coach for the National Football League
