= Jason Short =

American football player (born 1978)

No. 52
- Position: Linebacker

Personal information
- Born: July 15, 1978 (age 48); Painesville, Ohio, U.S.
- Listed height: 6 ft 4 in (1.93 m)
- Listed weight: 254 lb (115 kg)

Career information
- High school: Riverside (Painesville)
- College: Eastern Michigan
- NFL draft: 2001: undrafted

Career history
- Peoria Pirates (2002); Barcelona Dragons (2003); Philadelphia Eagles (2003–2006); Cleveland Browns (2007)*
- * Offseason or practice squad member only

Career NFL statistics
- Total tackles: 36
- Stats at Pro Football Reference

Jason Michael Short (born July 15, 1978) is an American former professional football player who was a linebacker for the Philadelphia Eagles of the National Football League (NFL). He played college football for the Eastern Michigan Eagles. He played in the NFL with the Eagles and also signed with the Cleveland Browns.

In 2006, Sports Illustrated ranked Jason Short among the "10 Most Feared NFL Players". On the Eagles team that played in the Super Bowl XXXIX vs. New England Patriots 2004-05 NFC Champions with Philadelphia Eagles
