= Headlands Beach State Park =

Park in Ohio, US

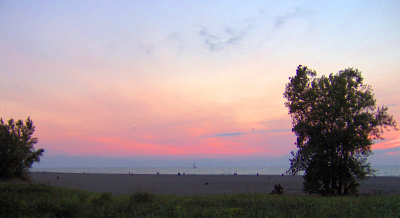

- Location within Ohio Location within the United States
- Location: Lake County, Ohio, United States
- Coordinates: 41°45′30″N 81°17′14″W
- Area: 120 acres (49 ha)
- Elevation: 584 ft (178 m)
- Opened: 1953
- Administrator: Ohio Department of Natural Resources
- Designation: Ohio state park
- Website: Headlands Beach State Park

Headlands Beach State Park is a public beach in Mentor and Painesville Township, Ohio, United States. It is the longest natural beach in Ohio and attracts two million visitors annually. The breakwall at the eastern end of the park, frequented by fishermen, is surmounted by the Fairport Harbor West Breakwater Light. The park features a 35-acre beach for sunbathing, swimming, and beach glass hunting along with picnicking facilities and seasonal concessionaire.

== Geography ==
Headlands Beach State Park is at the northern terminus of State Route 44 and the Buckeye Trail. The park is between the Mentor Marsh and the Grand River. It is next to Fairport Harbor Coast Guard station and a Morton Salt mine and abuts two other protected areas, Headlands Dunes State Nature Preserve to the east and Mentor Marsh State Nature Preserve to the west.

== History ==
The state began acquiring land for the park during the period 1951-1952. It opened under the name Painesville Beach State Park in 1953, with its name changed to Headlands Beach two years later.

== Accolades ==
In 1995, The Plain Dealer of Cleveland ranked Headlands as Ohio's best beach. In 2013, CNN listed Headlands Beach among the top 20 beaches in the United States per the nomination of readers of “CNN Travel.”

As with other state parks in Ohio, per Ohio Revised Code, both men and women are allowed to wear thong swimwear, and women are allowed to be topless, a practice upheld by Ohio courts in the 1990s, though discouraged by the Ohio Department of Natural Resources in the interest of promoting "a wholesome family environment."
