= LeRoy Township, Lake County, Ohio =

Township in Ohio, US

Leroy Township, Lake County, Ohio
- Township
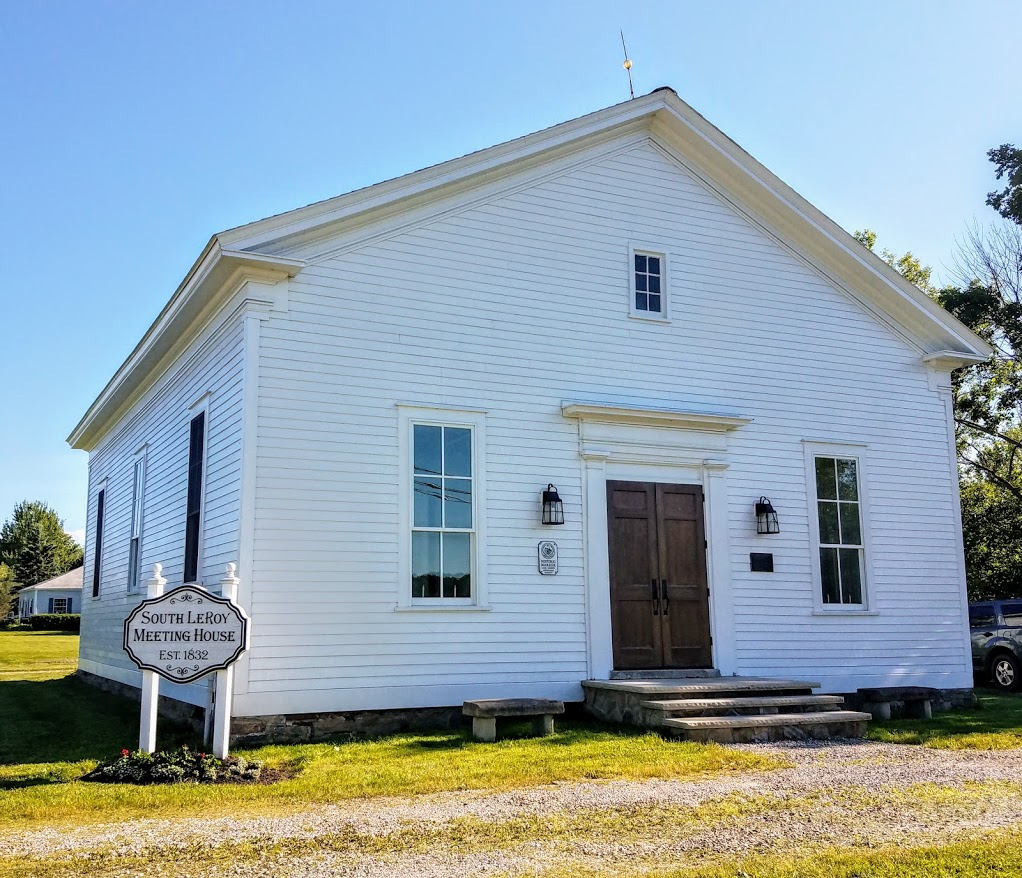
- South Leroy Meetinghouse

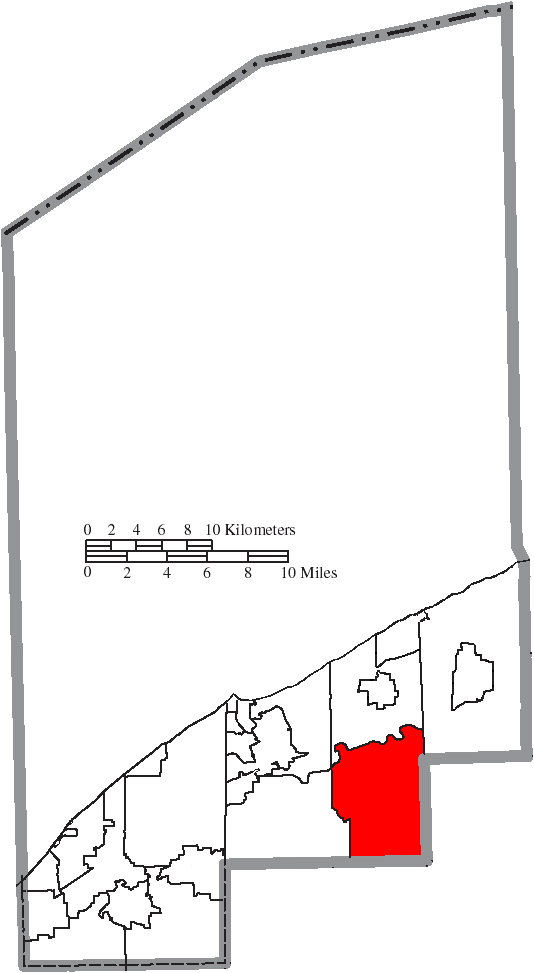
- Location of LeRoy Township in Lake County
- Coordinates: 41°42′6″N 81°8′30″W
- Country: United States
- State: Ohio
- County: Lake

Area
  - Total: 25.5 sq mi (66.1 km^{2})
  - Land: 25.4 sq mi (65.8 km^{2})
  - Water: 0.12 sq mi (0.3 km^{2})
- Elevation: 955 ft (291 m)

Population (2020)
  - Total: 3,128
  - Density: 123/sq mi (47.5/km^{2})
- Time zone: UTC-5 (Eastern (EST))
  - Summer (DST): UTC-4 (EDT)
- FIPS code: 39-42812
- GNIS feature ID: 1086422
- Website: leroyohio.com

LeRoy Township is one of the five townships of Lake County, Ohio, United States. As of the 2020 census the population was 3,128.

== Geography ==
Located in the eastern part of the county, it borders the following townships:

- Perry Township - north
- Madison Township - northeast
- Thompson Township, Geauga County - east
- Montville Township, Geauga County - southeast corner
- Hambden Township, Geauga County - south
- Concord Township - west
- Painesville Township - northwest corner

No municipalities are located in LeRoy Township.

According to the U.S. Census Bureau, the total area of LeRoy Township is 25.5 square miles (66.1 km^{2}), of which 25.4 square miles (65.8 km^{2}) are land and 0.1 square miles (0.3 km^{2}), or 0.50%, are water. The Grand River forms the northern boundary of the township.

== Name and history ==
Named for Le Roy, New York, the home of many of the township's earliest settlers, it is the only LeRoy Township statewide. Its name is often spelled "Leroy" and sometimes "Le Roy."

The first settlers in what is now LeRoy Township were Paul and Elijah Clapp, who arrived in 1802. LeRoy Township was established in 1820, but it was not made part of Lake County until 1840. During the Civil War, forty men from LeRoy Township served in the Union Army.

The January 1986 Northeastern Ohio earthquake occurred in the southwestern portion of the township.

== Government ==
The township is governed by a three-member board of trustees, who are elected in November of odd-numbered years to a four-year term beginning on the following January 1. Two are elected in the year after the presidential election and one is elected in the year before it. There is also an elected township fiscal officer, who serves a four-year term beginning on April 1 of the year after the election, which is held in November of the year before the presidential election. Vacancies in the fiscal officership or on the board of trustees are filled by the remaining trustees. As of 2019, the board is composed of chairman Chuck Klco and members Heather Shelton and Richard VanPelt, and the clerk is Julie Himmelman.

== See also ==
- Interstate 90 Grand River bridges
