= Northeast Ohio Conference =

- Classification: OHSAA; Northeast District; Class AAA; Divisions I, II
- Founded: 2007-2015
- Sports fielded: 22
- No. of teams: 20 overall (18 at a time)
- Region: Northeast Ohio
- Website: northeastohioconference.org

Locations
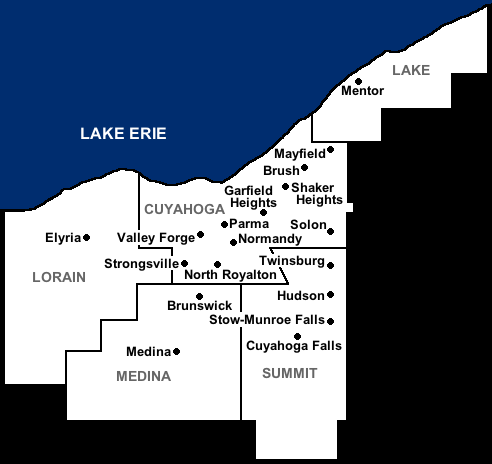

The Northeast Ohio Conference (NOC) was a high school athletics conference recognized by the Ohio High School Athletic Association (OHSAA), in Northeast Ohio. Eighteen member schools — each located within the Northeast District of the OHSAA (Class AAA, Divisions I and II) — competed in three six-member divisions: Valley, River and Lake. Dan Gerome served as the last NOC commissioner. Anthony J. Paletta designed the conference logo in 2006.

== Membership changes ==
=== Membership changes (2007–2012) ===
Following the 2010/11 school year, Mentor High School joined after leaving the Lake Erie League, while Nordonia High School left to join the Suburban League. Following the 2011/12 school year, Shaker Heights High School joined after leaving the Lake Erie League, while Lakewood High School left to join the West Shore Conference. Listed below are the current 18 member schools.

=== Membership changes (2013–present) ===
In November 2013 it was announced that seven schools were leaving the Northeast Ohio Conference to form a new league named the Greater Cleveland Conference. The schools leaving were Elyria, Brunswick, Medina, Mentor, Shaker Heights, Solon and Strongsville. Brush and Mayfield were also invited to join the Greater Cleveland Conference, but decided to join the newly created Western Reserve Conference. Cuyahoga Falls, Hudson, North Royalton, Stow-Munroe Falls and Twinsburg are also leaving to join the Suburban League.

== Member schools ==
Members spanned five Northeast Ohio counties: Cuyahoga, Lake, Lorain, Medina, and Summit.

School	Team name	Location	Colors	Tenure	Succeeding conference
Brunswick	Blue Devils	Brunswick		2007–2015	Greater Cleveland Conference
Brush	Arcs	Lyndhurst		2007–2015	Western Reserve Conference
Cuyahoga Falls	Black Tigers	Cuyahoga Falls		2007–2015	Suburban League
Elyria	Pioneers	Elyria		2007–2015	Greater Cleveland Conference
Garfield Heights	Bulldogs	Garfield Heights		2007–2015	Independent
Hudson	Explorers	Hudson, Ohio		2007–2015	Suburban League
Lakewood	Rangers	Lakewood		2007–2012	West Shore Conference
Mayfield	Wildcats	Mayfield		2007–2015	Western Reserve Conference
Medina	Battling Bees	Medina		2007–2015	Greater Cleveland Conference
Mentor	Cardinals	Mentor		2011–2015	Greater Cleveland Conference
Nordonia	Knights	Macedonia		2007–2011	Suburban League
Normandy	Invaders	Parma		2007–2015	Great Lakes Conference
North Royalton	Bears	North Royalton		2007–2015	Suburban League
Parma Senior	Redmen	Parma		2007–2015	Great Lakes Conference
Shaker Heights	Red Raiders	Shaker Heights		2012–2015	Greater Cleveland Conference
Solon	Comets	Solon		2007–2015	Greater Cleveland Conference
Stow-Munroe Falls	Bulldogs	Stow		2007–2015	Suburban League
Strongsville	Mustangs	Strongsville		2007–2015	Greater Cleveland Conference
Twinsburg	Tigers	Twinsburg		2007–2015	Suburban League
Valley Forge	Patriots	Parma Heights		2007–2015	Great Lakes Conference

== Valley, River and Lake Divisions ==
Divisional breakdowns (listed below) differ depending on the sport; considerations include strength, geography and traditional rivalries

=== Baseball ===
- Valley Division: Cuyahoga Falls, Hudson, Mayfield, Solon, Stow-Munroe Falls, Twinsburg
- River Division: Brunswick, Shaker Heights, Medina, Mentor, Garfield Heights, Strongsville
- Lake Division: Brush, North Royalton, Normandy, Parma Senior, Valley Forge

=== Boys Basketball ===
- Valley Division: Brunswick, Garfield Heights, Medina, Mentor, Shaker Heights, Strongsville
- River Division: Brush, Cuyahoga Falls, Hudson, Solon, Stow-Munroe Falls, Strongsville
- Lake Division: Elyria, Mayfield, Normandy, North Royalton, Parma Senior, Valley Forge

=== Girls Basketball ===
- Valley Division: Hudson, Mentor, Shaker Heights, Solon, Stow-Munroe Falls, Twinsburg
- River Division: Brunswick, Elyria, Mayfield, Medina, North Royalton, Strongsville
- Lake Division: Brush, Cuyahoga Falls, Garfield Heights, Normandy, Parma Senior, Valley Forge

=== Cross Country ===
- Valley Division: Brunswick, Hudson, Medina, Mentor, Solon, Strongsville
- River Division: Cuyahoga Falls, Mayfield, North Royalton, Shaker Heights, Stow-Munroe Falls, Twinsburg
- Lake Division: Brush, Elyria, Garfield Heights, Normandy, Parma Senior, Valley Forge

=== Football ===
- Valley Division: Brunswick, Hudson, Mentor, Solon, Strongsville, Twinsburg
- River Division: Elyria, Mayfield, Medina, North Royalton, Shaker Heights, Stow-Munroe Falls
- Lake Division: Brush, Cuyahoga Falls, Garfield Heights, Normandy, Parma Senior, Valley Forge

=== Boys Golf ===
- Valley Division: Brunswick, Elyria, Mayfield, Medina, North Royalton, Strongsville
- River Division: Cuyahoga Falls, Hudson, Mentor, Solon, Stow-Munroe Falls, Twinsburg
- Lake Division: Brush, Garfield Heights, Normandy, Parma, Shaker Heights, Valley Forge

=== Girls Golf ===
- Valley Division: Brunswick, Hudson, Medina, North Royalton, Solon, Strongsville
- River Division: Cuyahoga Falls, Mayfield, Mentor, Shaker Heights, Stow-Munroe Falls, Twinsburg

=== Boys Soccer ===
- Valley Division: Hudson, Medina, Mentor, Solon, Strongsville, Twinsburg
- River Division: Brunswick, Brush, Mayfield, North Royalton, Shaker Heights, Stow-Munroe Falls
- Lake Division: Cuyahoga Falls, Elyria, Garfield Heights, Normandy, Parma, Valley Forge

=== Girls Soccer ===
- Valley Division: Brunswick, Hudson, Medina, Mentor, North Royalton, Strongsville
- River Division: Cuyahoga Falls, Shaker Heights, Solon, Stow-Munroe Falls, Twinsburg, Valley Forge
- Lake Division: Brush, Elyria, Garfield Heights, Mayfield, Normandy, Parma

=== Girls Softball ===
- Valley Division: Brunswick, Elyria, Medina, North Royalton, Shaker Heights, Strongsville
- River Division: Cuyahoga Falls, Hudson, Mentor, Solon, Stow-Munroe Falls, Twinsburg
- Lake Division: Brush, Garfield Heights, Mayfield, Normandy, Parma, Valley Forge

=== Swimming & Diving ===
- Valley Division: Hudson, Mayfield, Mentor, Shaker Heights, Solon, Strongsville
- River Division: Brunswick, Cuyahoga Falls, Medina, North Royalton, Stow-Munroe Falls, Twinsburg
- Lake Division: Brush, Elyria, Garfield Heights, Normandy, Parma, Valley Forge

=== Boys Tennis ===
- Valley Division: Hudson, Medina, Mentor, Shaker Heights, Solon
- River Division: Brunswick, Cuyahoga Falls, Mayfield, North Royalton, Strongsville, Twinsburg
- Lake Division: Brush, Elyria, Garfield Heights, Normandy, Parma, Stow-Munroe Falls, Valley Forge

=== Girls Tennis ===
- Valley Division: Hudson, Mayfield, Medina, Mentor, Shaker Heights, Solon
- River Division: Brunswick, Cuyahoga Falls, Normandy, North Royalton, Stow-Munroe Falls, Strongsville
- Lake Division: Brush, Elyria, Garfield Heights, Parma, Twinsburg, Valley Forge

=== Track ===
- Valley Division: Brunswick, Medina, Mentor, Shaker Heights, Solon, Twinsburg
- River Division: Cuyahoga Falls, Hudson, Mayfield, North Royalton, Stow-Munroe Falls, Strongsville
- Lake Division: Brush, Elyria, Garfield Heights, Normandy, Parma Senior, Valley Forge

=== Volleyball ===
- Valley Division: Brunswick, Elyria, Medina, North Royalton, Solon, Strongsville
- River Division: Brush, Garfield Heights, Normandy, Parma, Shaker Heights, Valley Forge
- Lake Division: Cuyahoga Falls, Hudson, Mayfield, Mentor, Stow-Munroe Falls, Twinsburg

=== Wrestling ===
- Valley Division: Elyria, Mayfield, Mentor, Solon, Strongsville, Twinsburg
- River Division: Brunswick, Cuyahoga Falls, Hudson, Medina, North Royalton, Stow-Munroe Falls
- Lake Division: Brush, Garfield Heights, Normandy, Parma, Shaker Heights, Valley Forge

== State championships ==
This table only includes state championships won by schools while members of the Northeast Ohio Conference.

School	Sport	Year(s)
Elyria	Softball	2009
Medina	Cross Country - Boys	2007
Medina	Soccer - Girls	2009
Brunswick	Cross Country - Girls	2011
Mentor	Basketball - Boys	2013

== History ==
The NOC formed largely by the merging of two eight-member conferences: Pioneer and Western Reserve. Garfield Heights and Lakewood, then members of the Lake Erie League, also joined. The new conference began play during the 2007-08 school year.

=== Former Pioneer Conference ===
- See Pioneer Conference

=== Former Western Reserve Conference ===
- Brush Arcs
- Cuyahoga Falls Black Tigers
- Hudson Explorers
- Mayfield Wildcats
- Nordonia Knights
- Solon Comets
- Stow-Munroe Falls Bulldogs
- Twinsburg Tigers

== Sanctioned Sports ==
=== Fall ===
- Cross Country - Boys, Girls
- Football
- Golf - Boys, Girls
- Tennis - Girls
- Soccer - Boys, Girls
- Volleyball - Girls

=== Winter ===
- Basketball - Boys, Girls
- Gymnastics
- Swimming & Diving - Boys, Girls
- Wrestling

=== Spring ===
- Baseball
- Softball
- Tennis - Boys
- Track & Field - Boys, Girls

== See also ==
- Ohio high school athletic conferences
