= Pioneer Conference (Ohio) =

- Classification: OHSAA
- Founded: 1977
- No. of teams: 8 (final), 14 (total)
- Region: Northeast Ohio

The Pioneer Conference was a high school athletics conference in northeastern Ohio. It was founded in 1977. It disbanded after the 2006–2007 school year. The schools joined and help create the Northeast Ohio Conference. The Pioneer Conference was formed in 1977 with six original members: Brecksville, Brunswick, Cloverleaf, North Royalton, Strongsville and Wadsworth. These schools had similar challenges in the late 1970s. They were outgrowing their conference opponents they left behind when the league formed; the Chippewa conference (Orrville, Triway and West Holmes) and the Cuyahoga County Conference (Cuyahoga Hts, Brooklyn, Independence). Their communities were also easily accessible from I-71, I-76 and I-271 (and their school districts grew rapidly as a result of that). In recent years Cloverleaf is the only school that has seen a continued decline in school size. Two high schools in the Berea City School District — Berea and Midpark — joined in 1979. These two schools were also part of the growing I-71 corridor of the late 1970s. Wadsworth left in 1984 for the Suburban League and was replaced by Medina two years later. North Ridgeville replaced Cloverleaf, which left to join the Suburban League in 1997.

The conference briefly expanded to twelve when Elyria and the three high schools of the Parma City School District — Parma Senior High, Normandy and Valley Forge — joined in 2003; schools were split into two six-member divisions for most sports. In 2005, North Ridgeville left for the newly formed West Shore Conference; Berea, Brecksville and Midpark left for the Southwestern Conference. The eight remaining schools (listed below) continued their membership until the formation of the Northeast Ohio Conference in 2007:

== Member Schools ==
- Brunswick Blue Devils 1977–2007
- Elyria Pioneers 2003–2007
- Medina Battling Bees 1986–2007
- Normandy Invaders 2003–2007
- North Royalton Bears 1977–2007
- Parma Redmen 2003–2007
- Strongsville Mustangs 1977–2007
- Valley Forge Patriots 2003–2007

=== Former Members ===
- Berea Braves 1979–2005
- Brecksville Bees 1977–2005
- Cloverleaf Colts 1977–1997
- Midpark Meteors 1979–2005
- North Ridgeville Rangers 1997–2005
- Wadsworth Grizzlies 1977–1984

== Sanctioned Sports ==
=== Fall ===
- Cross Country
- Football
- Golf
- Soccer
- Tennis (Girls)
- Volleyball

=== Winter ===
- Basketball
- Swimming and Diving
- Wrestling
- Hockey
- Gymnastics

=== Spring ===
- Baseball
- Softball
- Tennis (Boys)
- Track and Field
