= Scott Effross =

American baseball player (born 1993)

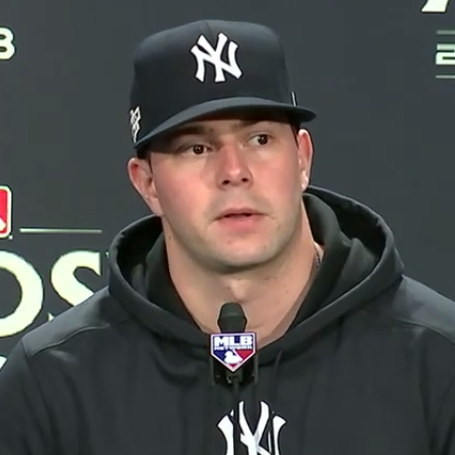
- Effross with the New York Yankees in 2022

Free agent
- Pitcher
- Born: December 28, 1993 (age 32); Twinsburg, Ohio, U.S.
- Bats: Right Throws: Right

MLB debut
- August 29, 2021, for the Chicago Cubs

MLB statistics (through 2025 season)
- Win–loss record: 3–5
- Earned run average: 3.59
- Strikeouts: 88
- Stats at Baseball Reference

Teams
- Chicago Cubs (2021–2022); New York Yankees (2022, 2024–2025)

Scott Benjamin-Morton Effross (born December 28, 1993) is an American professional baseball pitcher who is a free agent. He has previously played in Major League Baseball (MLB) for the Chicago Cubs and New York Yankees. Effross played college baseball for Indiana University. He was selected by the Cubs in the 15th round of the 2015 MLB draft, and made his MLB debut with them in 2021.

== Early years ==
A native of Twinsburg, Ohio, Effross is Jewish. Growing up he was a member of Congregation Shir Shalom, and he wears a Star of David necklace while pitching.

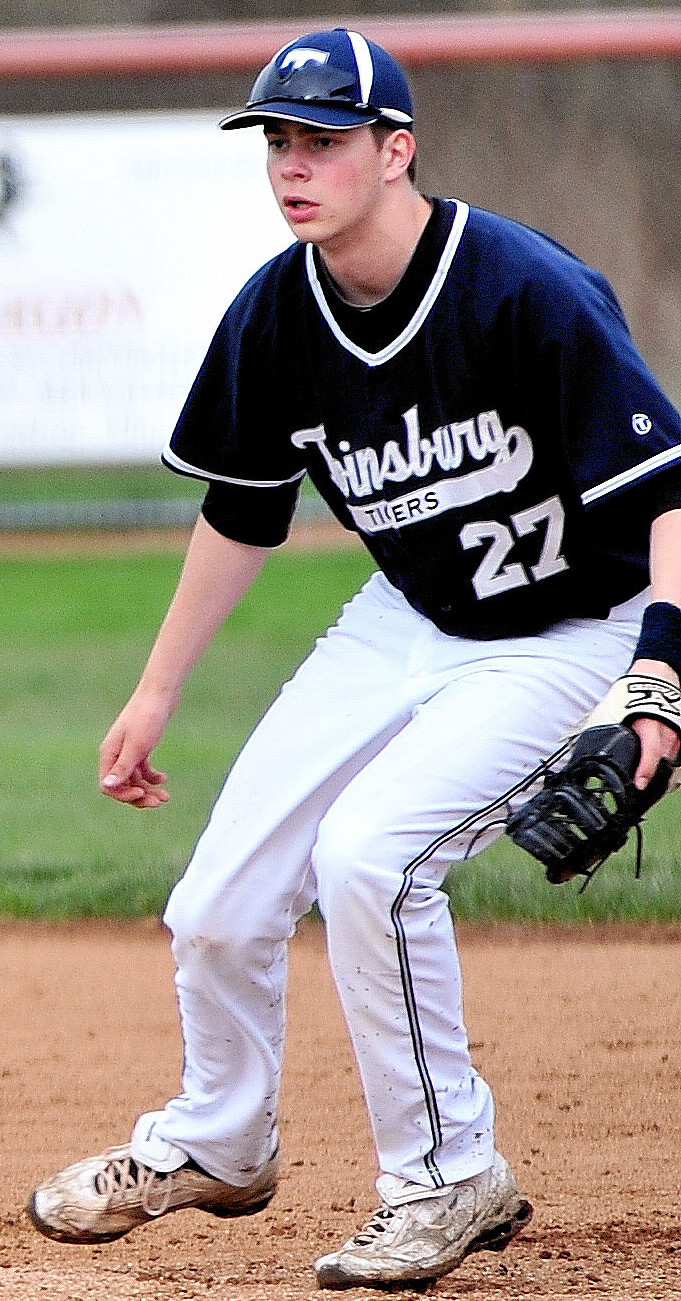
Effross playing for Twinsburg High School in 2011

Effross played baseball for Twinsburg High School ('12). In his senior year, as a pitcher he had an 8–1 win–loss record with a 1.52 earned run average (ERA), and struck out 60 batters while allowing 14 walks in 55 innings pitched. He was also the team's first baseman, and in his senior year batted .380. He was First Team All-Northeast Ohio Conference in 2011 and 2012, named to the Plain Dealer High School Baseball All-Star team, the Northeast Ohio Baseball Coaches Association All Star Team, and the All-Ohio Academic Team in 2012, and was Mizuno All-Ohio in 2012.

== College career ==
Effross enrolled at Indiana University and played college baseball for the Indiana Hoosiers, while majoring in political science. In his freshman season in 2013 he was 6–1 with a 2.44 ERA and threw 62 2/3 innings in 28 games, the fourth-most pitching appearances in a season in school history. His five saves tied for 10th in school history. He was a Louisville Slugger Freshman All-American, Second Team All-Big Ten Conference, and a member of the Big Ten All-Freshman team.

In his sophomore year, in 2014, Effross was 5–3 with a 1.98 ERA (the 10th-best mark in school history, minimum 50 innings), was first in the Big Ten with a school record 32 appearances, tied for first with 31 games in relief, tied for fourth with 19 games finished, and was eighth with five saves. He also played collegiate summer baseball for the Wareham Gatemen of the Cape Cod Baseball League, and was named a league all-star.

In 2015, as a junior, Effross was 4–4 with two saves and a 2.35 ERA (sixth in the Big Ten) in 21 games (seven starts). Effross pitched 61 1/3 innings, had an 0.962 WHIP (fifth), gave up 1.3 walks per nine innings (seventh), and kept opposing batters to a .217 batting average against (7th). At the time, his fastball averaged about 92 miles per hour (148 km/h), and he also threw a changeup and a slider. The Jewish Sports Review named Effross to their 2015 Division I College Baseball All-America team. He finished his college career with 81 pitching appearances (fourth all-time at Indiana University), tied for fifth with 12 saves, and was seventh with a 2.27 ERA.

== Professional career ==
=== Chicago Cubs ===
==== Minor leagues ====
The Chicago Cubs drafted Effross in the 15th round, with the 443rd overall selection, of the 2015 MLB draft, and he signed for a signing bonus of $100,000. In 2015, Effross pitched for the AZL Cubs of the Rookie Arizona League, and the Eugene Emeralds of the Low–A Northwest League. Between the two teams, he was 0–1 with two saves and a 2.14 ERA in 12 relief appearances covering 21 innings. In 2016 he played for the South Bend Cubs of the Single–A Midwest League, and the Myrtle Beach Pelicans of the High–A Carolina League. Between the two teams he was 7–0 with two saves and a 3.23 ERA in 41 games covering 64 innings.

In 2017, Effross again pitched for Myrtle Beach. Effross was 5–2 with nine saves (4th in the Carolina League) and a 3.40 ERA in 42 games (3rd), including 2 starts, covering 79.1 innings in which he gave up only one home run. In 2018, Effross pitched for the Tennessee Smokies of the Double–A Southern League. He was 2–6 with one save and a 5.97 ERA in 44 relief appearances (4th in the league) covering 63.1 innings.

In 2019 he played for the AZL Cubs 2 of the Arizona League, the Pelicans, and the Smokies and was 2–2 with a 4.33 ERA in 28 games (one start) covering 52 innings, and gave up only 1.7 walks per 9 innings. In mid-2019, the Cubs approached Effross about changing his pitching motion to a full sidearm motion, from what had been a low three-quarters angle, and he credits rehab pitching coordinator Josh Zeid with helping him through the mid-season change. In the fall of 2019 he then pitched for the Mesa Solar Sox of the Arizona Fall League, and was 1–0 with a 1.80 ERA in eight relief appearances covering 10 innings.

In 2021, Effross split the season between the Smokies, now in the Double-A South, and the Iowa Cubs of the Triple-A East. Effross was 7–2 with two saves and a 3.41 ERA in 31 games (2 starts) covering 60.2 innings in which he gave up 44 hits and 15 walks while striking out 66 batters (9.8 strikeouts per 9 innings), with an 0.973 WHIP.

==== Major leagues ====
Effross was called up to the majors for the first time on August 28, 2021. He made his MLB debut on August 29, tossing 2/3 innings against the Chicago White Sox. In 2021 for the Cubs, Effross was 2–1 with a 3.68 ERA. He made 14 relief appearances covering 14 2/3 innings, in which he gave up one walk and had 18 strikeouts, and had an 0.955 WHIP.

In 2022 for the Cubs, before he was traded mid-season Effross was 1–4 with 13 holds, one save, and a 2.66 ERA, as in 47 games (2nd in the NL at the time of his trade) with one start he pitched 44 innings, with 11 walks and 50 strikeouts. He stranded 24 of 28 inherited runners (85.7%), the third-best rate in the NL. He had a WHIP of 1.068, gave up 7.4 hits per 9 innings, 2.3 walks per 9 innings, and had 10.2 strikeouts per 9 innings, while holding batters to a slash line of .220/.267/.299 (.167/.231/.292 with 2 outs and runners in scoring position). He was at the time in the top 5% of major league pitchers in keeping batters to a low barrel percentage, and inducing a high chase rate. He had the seventh-lowest average release point of major league pitchers, at 3.67 feet above the ground, as compared to the average of 5.82 feet.

=== New York Yankees ===
==== 2022–23 ====
On August 1, 2022, the Cubs traded Effross to the New York Yankees for pitcher Hayden Wesneski. With the Yankees in 2022 he was 0–0 with 3 saves, 3 holds, and a 2.14 ERA in 13 relief appearances in which he pitched 12 2/3 innings, with a 1.026 WHIP, in high-leverage situations.

In 2022, with the Cubs and the Yankees combined, Effross was 1–4 with four saves and 16 holds. He had a 2.54 ERA, as in 60 relief appearances he pitched 56 2/3 innings, had 62 strikeouts, and a WHIP of 1.059. Among major league relievers with 50 or more innings pitched, he allowed the lowest percentage of hard-hit balls (19.0%) and pulled balls (28.9%), had the highest called-strike percentage (20.7%), and allowed the 2nd-lowest barrel percentage (3.5%). He threw mostly an 80-mile-per-hour (130 km/h) sweeping slider (against which batters hit .149) and 90-mile-per-hour (140 km/h) biting sinker, with a less frequent 83-mile-per-hour (134 km/h) changeup and 91-mile-per-hour (146 km/h) heavy sinking 4-seam fastball.

On October 13, 2022, Effross had Tommy John surgery to repair a torn UCL ligament in his right elbow. He therefore missed the 2022 playoffs. He also missed the entire 2023 season; rehabilitation and recovery from Tommy John surgery generally take at least 12 months, and often longer.

==== 2024–25 ====
On February 14, 2024, it was announced that Effross would miss multiple months as a result of a December low back surgery, and he was subsequently placed on the 60–day injured list. He was activated from the injured list and optioned to the Triple–A Scranton/Wilkes-Barre RailRiders on July 14.

In 2024 in the minor leagues, Effross pitched 32 1/3 innings for Scranton/Wilkes-Barre and three innings for the Tampa Tarpons. Combined, he was 8-1 (7th in the International League with a 2.78 ERA) with one save and a 2.55 ERA (in 29 relief appearances covering 35 1/3 innings, in which he had an 0.997 WHIP. For the Yankees, Effross pitched only 3 1/3 innings, in which he gave up three hits and two earned runs.

Effross made 11 appearances for the Yankees during the 2025 campaign, but struggled to an 8.44 ERA with six strikeouts across 10 2/3 innings pitched. On November 21, 2025, he was non-tendered by New York and became a free agent.

=== Detroit Tigers ===
On December 17, 2025, Effross signed a minor league contract with the Detroit Tigers. He made 27 appearances for the Triple–A Toledo Mud Hens, compiling a 3–1 record and 4.46 ERA with 26 strikeouts across 36 1/3 innings pitched; he also logged two scoreless appearances for the Single–A Lakeland Flying Tigers. On August 8, 2026, the Tigers released Effross from his minor league contract.

=== Seattle Mariners ===
On August 12, 2026, Effros signed a minor league deal with the Seattle Mariners. In 11 games with Triple-A Tacoma Rainiers he threw 15.1 innings of relief going 1-0 with a 4.70 ERA and 7 strikeouts. He elected free agency on November 2.

== See also ==
- List of Jewish Major League Baseball players
- List of Jews in Sports
