= Pioneer Conference =

Pioneer Conference may refer to:

- Pioneer Conference (Illinois), intercollegiate athletic conference that existed in the U.S. state of Illinois from 1947 to 1949
- Pioneer Conference (Indiana), high school athletic conference in the U.S. state of Indiana, founded in 2009
- Pioneer Conference (junior college), junior college athletic conference that existed in the U.S. states of Oklahoma and Texas from 1949 to 1961
- Pioneer Conference (Ohio), high school athletic conference in the U.S. state of Ohio, founded in 1977

== See also ==
- Pioneer Athletic Conference, high school athletic conference in the U.S. state of Pennsylvania, founded in 1985
