= Western Reserve Conference =

High school athletics conferences in northeast Ohio, United States

The Western Reserve Conference or Western Reserve League can refer to one of six high school athletics conferences that have existed at various times in the northern Ohio area known as the Western Reserve. The earliest league with the name dates to 1932, while the most recent version existed from 2015 to 2026.

== Western Reserve Conference (2015) ==
The most recent league with the Western Reserve name was known as the Western Reserve Conference and began play in 2015. Member schools were located in Cuyahoga, Geauga, and Lake counties. The conference dissolved at the end of the 2025–26 school year after all members departed for other conferences.

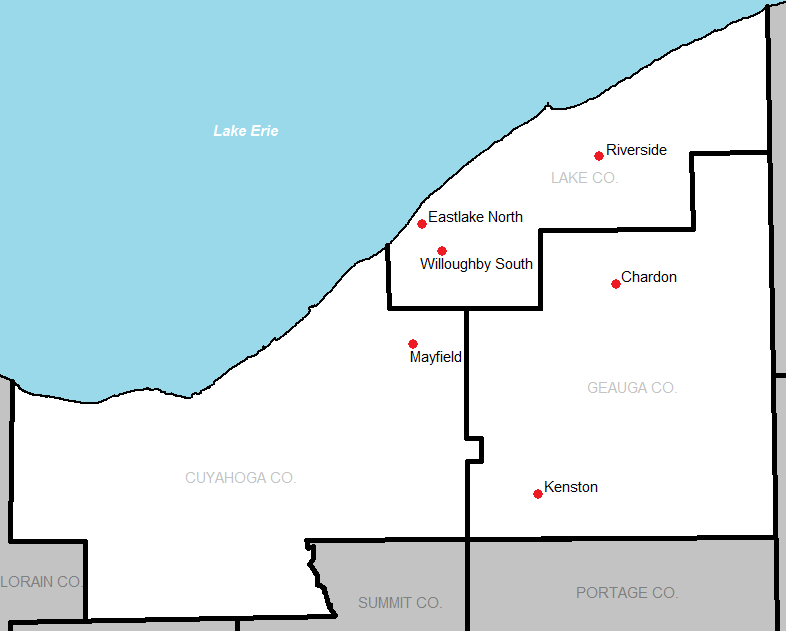
Western Reserve Conference membership 2023–2026.

School	Nickname	Location	Colors	Tenure	Notes
Brush	Arcs	Amherst	Brown and gold	2015–2021	became independent in 2021
Chardon	Hilltoppers	Chardon	Red & black	2015–2026	left for Chagrin Valley Conference
Madison	Blue Streaks	Madison	Blue & white	2015–2023	left for Chagrin Valley Conference
Eastlake North	Rangers	Eastlake	Orange & black	2015–2026	left for Chagrin Valley Conference
Kenston	Bombers	Bainbridge	Blue & white	2015–2026	left for Suburban League
Mayfield	Wildcats	Mayfield	Green & white	2015–2026	leaving for Suburban League in 2026
Riverside	Beavers	Painesville	Black & gold	2015–2026	left for Greater Cleveland Conference
Willoughby South	Rebels	Willoughby	Columbia blue & gray	2015–2026	left for Chagrin Valley Conference

== Western Reserve League (1932) ==
The first league to use the Western Reserve name was founded as the Western Reserve League in 1932. Many of its members had been part of the Trolley League, which had disbanded in 1929. While the majority of membership was in Portage and Summit counties, there were also periods of time with single members from Medina and Wayne counties. By 1942, membership was reduced to just four schools. When St. Vincent announced its departure from the league effective in June 1948, leaving only three schools as members, the remaining schools elected to suspend operations. Attempts were made to expand the league, but were ultimately unsuccessful.

School	Nickname	Location	Tenure	Notes
Cuyahoga Falls	Black Tigers	Cuyahoga Falls	1936–1948	league dissolved
Kent State	Blue Devils	Kent	1932–1936	left for the Metro League
St. Vincent	Fighting Irish	Akron	1938–1948	Left for independence
Ellet	Orangemen	Akron	1932–1936	left for Metro League
Orrville	Red Raiders	Orrville	1932–1937	
Ravenna	Ravens	Ravenna	1934–1948	league dissolved
Roosevelt	Rough Riders	Kent	1932–1948	league dissolved
Wadsworth	Grizzlies	Wadsworth	1932–1942	

== Twin Valley League ==
A second Western Reserve League was established in 1936 in Huron and Richland counties. Its members were Butler Township, Cass Township, Plymouth, New Haven Township, Fairfield Township, and Greenwich. By September, this league was renamed the Twin Valley League after it was discovered that a league with the Western Reserve name already existed.

== Western Reserve League (1939) ==
The third league to use the Western Reserve name was founded in 1939, also as the Western Reserve League, and was initially based in Lake and Geauga counties and later expanded into Ashtabula County. It existed until 1968.

School	Nickname	Location	Tenure	Notes
Chagrin Falls	Tigers	Chagrin Falls	1939–1944	left for Cuyahoga County League
Chardon	Hilltoppers	Chardon	1939–1968	left for Chagrin Valley Conference
Conneaut	Trojans	Conneaut	1951–1959	left for Northeastern Conference
Edgewood	Warriors	Ashtabula	1962–1965	left for Northeastern Conference
Harbor	Mariners	Ashtabula	1951–1965	left for Northeastern Conference
Jefferson	Falcons	Jefferson	1954–1968	left for Northeastern
Fairport Harding	Skippers	Fairport Harbor	1948–1951; 1962–1968	left for Northeastern in 1951, rejoined in 1962 and left for Lake Shore Conference in 1968
Kirtland	Hornets	Kirtland	1939–1960	left for Great Lakes Athletic Conference
Mentor	Cardinals	Mentor	1939–1951	left for Northeastern Conference
Rowe	Vikings	Conneaut	1951–1964	consolidated into Conneaut
Spencer	Wildcats	Geneva	1957–1961	consolidated into Geneva
Madison	Blue Streaks	Madison	1942–1968	left for Lake Shore League
Perry	Pirates	Perry	1939–1968	left for Lake Shore League
Wickliffe	Blue Devils	Wickliffe	1942–1957	left for Northeastern Conference

=== Western Reserve League (1975) ===
The fourth league with the Western Reserve name began play in 1975. It was the first to be called the Western Reserve Conference, though as early as its first season it was also called the Western Reserve League, with both names used interchangeably until 1996. It was made up of smaller private schools. By the 1990s, its member schools were all Christian schools and competed outside the OHSAA as part of the Association of Christian Schools International.

=== Western Reserve Conference (1996) ===
The fifth league with the Western Reserve name began play in 1996 and was the second to be called the Western Reserve Conference. It was created by merging the existing five Metropolitan League teams to form the South Division, along with five schools from the Chagrin Valley Conference to form the North Division. The initial plan was for two six-team divisions, but existing league obligations for some schools prevented them from joining until 1997 and 1998.

Changes in enrollment, however, led Ravenna, Barberton, Kenston, and Kent Roosevelt to announce at various times in 2003 their intentions to leave the conference in 2005. As a result, the divisions were eliminated in 2005. The conference existed until 2007 when the remaining eight members merged with the Pioneer Conference to form the Northeast Ohio Conference.

School	Nickname	Location	Tenure	Notes
Barberton	Magics	Barberton	1996–2005	left for Suburban League
Brush	Arcs	Lyndhurst	1996–2007	left for Northeast Ohio Conference
Cuyahoga Falls	Black Tigers	Cuyahoga Falls	1996–2007	merged into Northeast Ohio Conference
Hudson	Explorers	Hudson	1997–2007	merged into Northeast Ohio Conference
Kenston	Bombers	Bainbridge	1996–2005	left for Chagrin Valley Conference
Mayfield	Wildcats	Mayfield	1998–2007	merged into Northeast Ohio Conference
Nordonia	Knights	Macedonia	1997–2007	merged into Northeast Ohio Conference
Orange	Lions	Pepper Pike	1996–1998	left for Chagrin Valley Conference
Ravenna	Ravens	Ravenna	1996–2005	left for Portage Trail Conference
Roosevelt	Rough Riders	Kent	1996–2005	left for Portage Trail Conference
Solon	Comets	Solon	1996–2007	merged into Northeast Ohio Conference
Stow–Munroe Falls	Bulldogs	Stow	1996–2007	merged into Northeast Ohio Conference
Twinsburg	Tigers	Twinsburg	1996–2007	merged into Northeast Ohio Conference
West Geauga	Wolverines	Chesterland	1996–1998	left for Chagrin Valley Conference

== See also ==
- OHSAA Northeast Region defunct athletic conferences
- OHSAA Northeast Region athletic conferences
