= Strongsville City School District =

School district in Ohio, United States

Location
- Strongsville, Ohio United States

District information
- Type: Public
- Motto: "Inspiring and empowering today's learners to build tomorrow's leaders"
- Grades: Preschool – 12
- Established: 1961; 65 years ago
- Superintendent: Dr. Cameron Ryba
- Asst. superintendent(s): Jennifer Pelko
- Schools: 9
- Budget: $89,289,000 (2022-2023)
- NCES District ID: 3904484

Students and staff
- Students: 5,757 (2025–2026)
- Teachers: 334.80 (on an FTE basis) (2025–2026)
- Staff: 807.44 (on an FTE basis) (2025–2026)
- Student–teacher ratio: 17.20 (2025–2026)
- Athletic conference: Greater Cleveland Conference
- District mascot: Marty Mustang
- Colors: Forest Green and White

Other information
- Website: www.scsmustangs.org

Strongsville City School District, commonly referred to as Strongsville City Schools (SCS), is a school district in Strongsville, Ohio. The district has a preschool, five elementary schools, a middle school, and a high school.

== Schools ==
=== High school (9-12) ===
- Strongsville High School

=== Middle school (6-8) ===
- Strongsville Middle School

=== Elementary schools (K-5) ===
- Chapman Elementary School
- Kinsner Elementary School
- Whitney Elementary School
- Muraski Elementary School
- Surrarrer Elementary School

=== Other school ===
- Early Learning Preschool

=== Former schools ===
==== Former middle schools ====
- Albion Middle School
- Center Middle School

==== Former elementary schools ====
- Allen Elementary School
- Drake Elementary School
- Zellers Elementary School

== History ==
Strongsville City School District was established in 1961 following the City of Strongsville withdrawing from the Cuyahoga County School System.

=== Minarcini v. Strongsville City School District ===
Minarcini v. Strongsville City School District was a 1976 United States Court of Appeals for the Sixth Circuit decision regarding the banning of books at Strongsville High School. In 1972, the Strongsville Board of Education voted to remove the novels Catch-22 and Cat's Cradle from the library, and forbid the faculty to use either book, and a third, God Bless You, Mr. Rosewater, as educational text. Five students and their parents subsequently sued SCS citing that the banning of the books was an unconstitutional abridging of the First Amendment. In 1973, the American Civil Liberties Union represented the plaintiffs in the case on a volunteer basis, which they lost in the district court. They appealed the case which subsequently overturned the lower court's decision, affirming that it was a violation of freedom of speech laws to ban the books.

=== 2013 teacher strike ===
In 2013, SEA and the Strongsville Board of Education were having contract negotiations for the teachers upcoming contract, after the previous one had expired in June 2012. When negotiations were not agreed upon by the time the teachers' union had set, they went on strike in March 2013. The teachers' strike lasted for eight weeks. During this time frame, SEA and its president, Tracy Linscott, held picket lines outside of all the schools within the SCS district. Contracts were agreed upon on April 27, 2013, which ended the eight week strike.

==== Negotiations ====
In the December 2012 five-year-forecast of the SCS district, significant fiscal challenges were outlined. This prompted the Strongsville Board of Education to seek new concessions in the upcoming contract renewal for the teachers. The Board wanted:

- Requiring teachers to pay a portion, 15 percent, of their own dental care premiums
- Increasing the teachers monthly health premium
- Conversion of the 9.3% pension pick-up to a 9.3% salary increase
- Using teacher evaluations for lay-offs and only relying on seniority as a tie-breaker

The Strongsville Education Association did not agree with the percentages and new increases in their healthcare. SEA claimed terms were unfair over the course of negotiations before the strike. The teachers argued that their salary scale had not been increased since the 2007-2008 school year and that their health coverage had already increased since then. Over the course of the eight week strike, Tracy Linscott, SEA President, negotiated with the School Board and the Board President, David Frazee. The final contract was agreed upon by SEA on Saturday, April 27 and the School Board voted unanimously on it on Sunday, April 28. The contract included increased contributions by SCS to pension funds, the restoration of stepped annual raises, retaliation protection for NLRA-protected strikes for teachers and students, and increased healthcare plan costs for the teachers.

==== During the strike ====
On March 4, 2013, students of the SCS district showed up to school and saw their teachers outside with signs and whistles blocking the school driveways. Some of the signs read, "No Contract, No Work!" and, "Lies & tricks will not divide, workers standing side by side". The striking teachers wore heavy coats and gloves on the picket line. They had tables with hot chocolate and donuts surrounding them, as they had planned to stay outside for the duration of the school day. Several students gathered on the picket line with the teachers to show their support. They had signs that read, "Need a Bandaid for that Scab?", in reference to the nickname the teachers had given the 140 substitutes that had taken their place.

When students that didn't gather on the picket line went into the schools, they were assigned to classrooms by their last names. The classrooms at Strongsville High School were overcrowded because the administration had anticipated lower attendance rates than usual. One picketing teacher at Center Middle School was arrested and charged with disorderly conduct for blocking vehicles from entering the school grounds. On Friday, March 8, just days after the strike began, concerned residents held a rally in the center of town to demonstrate their displeasure with the teachers and SEA. The group that organized the rally called themselves "Taxpayers at the Table" and felt that they should take part in contract negotiations.

==== State ex. rel. Quolke v. Strongsville City School District ====
State ex. rel. Quolke v. Strongsville City School District was a Supreme Court of Ohio decision involving the state's freedom of information law. In April 2013, the president of the Cleveland Teachers Union sued SCS for "improperly withholding requested public records" by not disclosing the names and information of substitute teachers hired during the strike. SCS argued they had the right to withhold them to protect their personal safety and property, arguing the records were exempt due to the threat of harm. The district court ruled in favor of SCS, agreeing that picketing SEA teachers actions amounted to "violent incidents" that warranted exemptions. The actions cited were that they "jeered and cursed" at the replacement teachers, including calling them scabs; in one instance cut off another driver with their vehicle; and created a "wall of shame" online.

Upon appeal, the Ohio Eighth District Court of Appeals court agreed with the lower court, based on the depth of information requested, which included addresses and phone numbers. After the request was amended to only include the teachers' names, the appellate court reversed the decision, ruling that courts should interpret public records law liberally in favor of disclosing disputed records. In March 2015, the Supreme Court of Ohio affirmed the appellate court's ruling that the identities of replacement teachers are public records under Ohio law and required SCS to disclose them. The court's decision said that there was no longer a threat because the strike was over.

=== Fraud and theft case ===
A former SCS maintenance department foreman was convicted in 2019 of improperly using SCS funds and materials he had access to in his role. The foreman did not have any oversight, and was responsible for approving his own invoices. He stole construction materials purchased for the school's maintenance and embezzled funds from the accounts to purchase a John Deere utility vehicle, a snow plow, a lawn mower, shed, and other expensive appliances and equipment. He signed a plea agreement to serve a 9-month prison sentence.

SCS launched a fraud report hotline in 2019 after the foreman's fraud was uncovered by the Ohio Auditor of State.

=== Substance abuse prevention ===
After a rise in incidents involving vaping, SCS increased the punishment for students caught with the devices to out-of-school suspension; and expulsion and police involvement for subsequent offenses. After implementing the changes, incidents dropped, which they attributed to the severe punishments. They later introduced a nicotine dependence prevention education program developed by the American Lung Association, Intervention for Nicotine Dependence: Education, Prevention, Tobacco and Health (INDEPTH).

In 2024, SCS implemented a policy for grades 6 through 12 requiring students with driving privileges, or those who play sports or participate in other extracurricular activities to submit to random drug testing. The five-panel drug test is administered by a third-party, Great Lakes Biomedical, and tests for THC, the psychoactive constituent found in cannabis, nicotine, alcohol, and other substances. The substances tested is subject to the discretion of SCS. First offenses are subject to a voluntary substance abuse diversion program or a suspension from activities and loss of driving privileges, escalating for repeated offenses. Positive drug tests cannot be recorded in a student's record or lead to suspension or expulsion from school.
