= George White (Canadian football) =

American gridiron football player (born 1977)

No. 36
- Position: Linebacker

Personal information
- Born: November 17, 1977 (age 48); Detroit, Michigan, U.S.
- Listed height: 6 ft 1 in (1.85 m)
- Listed weight: 204 lb (93 kg)

Career information
- High school: North Royalton
- College: Boston College

Career history
- 2000–2002: Saskatchewan Roughriders
- 2003–2006: Calgary Stampeders
- 2006: BC Lions

Awards and highlights
- CFL All-Star (2000); 3× CFL West All-Star (2000, 2001, 2005); Jackie Parker Trophy (2000)
- Stats at CFL.ca

George White (born November 17, 1977) is a former Canadian Football League linebacker.

== High school ==
White attended North Royalton High School in North Royalton, Ohio, where he was a standout in football, basketball, and track and field. In senior football, he won All-State honors, was a Blue Chip All-American, and was selected to play in the Big 33 Classic.

== College career ==
White attended Boston College, where he was a star in both football and track and field. In football, he was a four-year letterman and finished his career with four sacks and 273 tackles. In track and field, he was the champion in the outdoor long jump.
