= Zoltán Meskó (American football) =

American football player (born 1986)

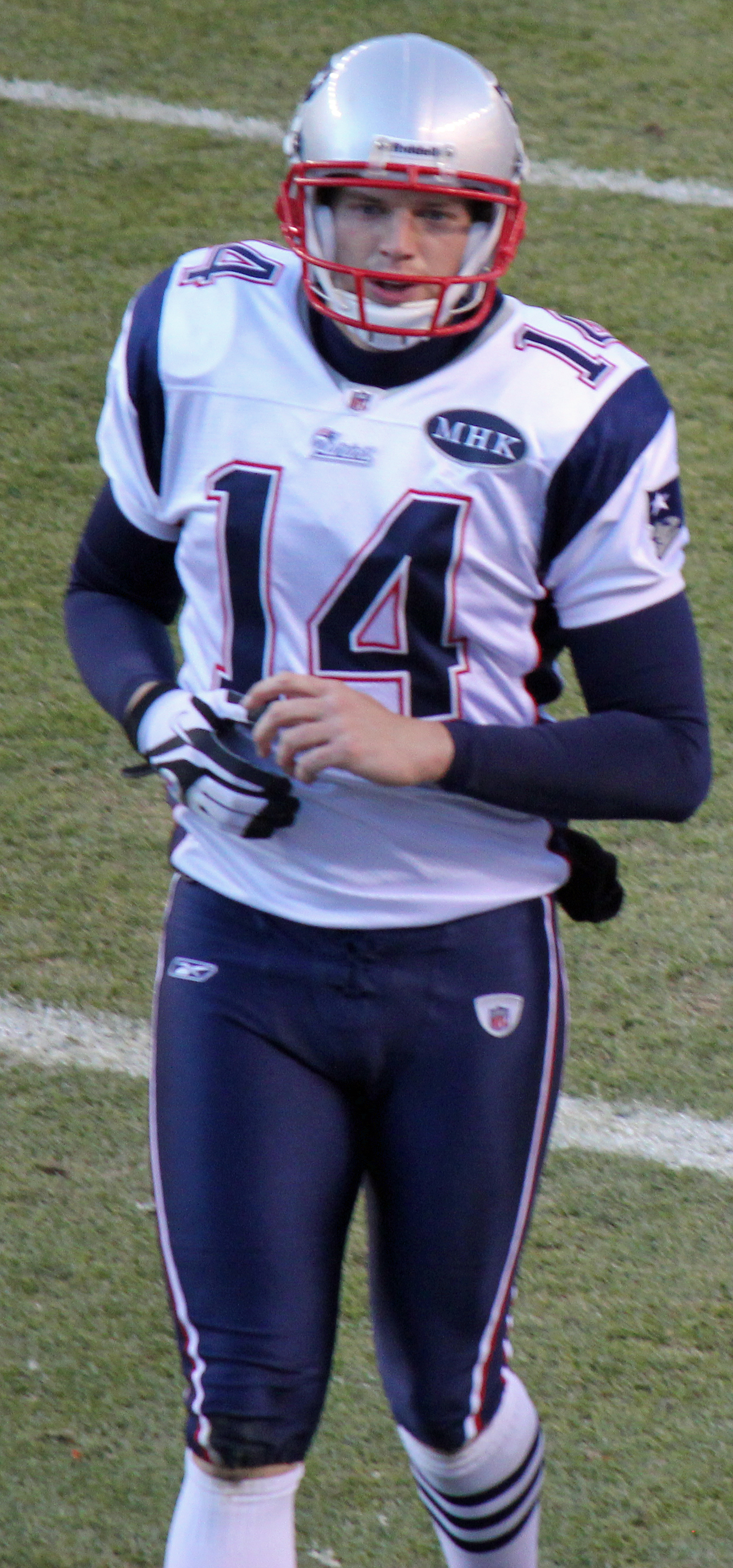
- Meskó with the New England Patriots in 2011

No. 14, 4, 3
- Position: Punter

Personal information
- Born: 16 March 1986 (age 40); Timișoara, Romania
- Listed height: 6 ft 4 in (1.93 m)
- Listed weight: 234 lb (106 kg)

Career information
- High school: Twinsburg (Twinsburg, Ohio, U.S.)
- College: Michigan
- NFL draft: 2010: 5th round, 150th overall pick

Career history
- New England Patriots (2010–2012); Pittsburgh Steelers (2013); Cincinnati Bengals (2013)

Awards and highlights
- PFWA All-Rookie Team (2010); Second-team All-American (2009); 2× First-team All-Big Ten (2008, 2009)

Career NFL statistics
- Punts: 209
- Punt long: 65
- Punting yard average: 43.9
- Net punting yard average: 39.0
- Stats at Pro Football Reference

Zoltán Meskó (/ˈzoʊltɑːn ˈmɛskoʊ/; Hungarian: [ˈmɛʃkoː ˈzoltaːn]; born 16 March 1986) is a Romanian former professional player of American football who was a punter in the National Football League (NFL). He was selected by the New England Patriots in the fifth round of the 2010 NFL draft. He played college football for the Michigan Wolverines. Born in Romania, Meskó emigrated with his family to the United States and eventually settled in Ohio. There he was discovered as a potential kicker for his school's football team, the Twinsburg Tigers, and became one of the best high school football kickers in the nation, excelling as both a punter and placekicker. After earning top honors in his state, Meskó was recruited by several college football teams. He selected Michigan over several schools including Indiana, Ohio State, and USC.

At Michigan, Meskó did not win the starting job as a punter right away. He redshirted his freshman year and won a battle for the kicking duties on the field in 2006. Meskó then went on to excel on the field as a three-time Ray Guy Award watchlist candidate and off the field as a four-time Academic All-Conference selection. He was also recognized for his character and community service by numerous organizations. As a redshirt junior in 2008, Meskó endured the dynamics of a coaching change, became Michigan's all-time leader in punts and punting yardage, and was named to 2008 All-Big Ten first-team. As a fifth-year senior in 2009, he made a number of preseason All-American teams and achieved the highest punting average of his college career at 44.5 yards per punt. Meskó concluded his season as a 2009 All-Big Ten first-team selection by both the coaches and the media. He was also selected as a first-team Academic All-American and as a second-team All-American by several publications. He holds the career and single-season records for punts and punting yards at Michigan.

In the NFL, Meskó set a rookie record for net punting yard average.

== Early life ==
Meskó, who comes from the Hungarian minority in Romania, was born in Timișoara, where he lived with his family in 1989 during the revolutions leading to the fall of communism in the former Eastern Bloc and the overthrow of dictator Nicolae Ceauşescu in Romania. The family was so immersed in the middle of the crossfire that they often dodged bullets by getting on the floor in their apartment. Zoltán was just passing through toddlerhood at the time of the revolution so he does not remember much of the details, but the family stuffed windows with pillows during the conflict. As a child, Meskó had a strong interest in soccer. His childhood heroes were Gheorghe Hagi and former NBA star Gheorghe Mureșan. At the age of twelve, he immigrated with his family to Ohio and Meskó was introduced to American football when he was spotted as a potential kicker in eighth grade gym class when he knocked out a light during a kickball game. Meskó is a left-footed kicker. Meskó, who could not distinguish a football from a rugby ball when he first arrived in the states, familiarized himself with the sport of American football via the television.

In 2003, Meskó earned Northeast Ohio Inland All-District Division II football team honorable mention recognition from the media while performing as a punter and placekicker for Twinsburg High School. He was also selected as Western Reserve North Division First-team by the coaches as well as the All-Summit County Team kicker. The Plain Dealer listed him as their first team kicker. During the year, he was 10 for 14 on field goals, while only missing one point after touchdown attempt and averaging 36 yards per punt. He placed 80% of his kickoffs in the end zone and maintained a 4.0 grade point average. During the season, he made a 41-yard field goal and a game-winning 31-yard field goal. By the end of the season, he had started 31 consecutive games. Twinsburg qualified for the state playoffs for the first time in ten years thanks in part to a solid kicking game. During his junior year, he got his first recruiting feeler from Division III Mount Union College.

After his junior season, he compiled tapes of his best punts, field goals, and kickoffs and sent them to 86 schools, hoping for ten responses. As a result of his tapes, he received 14 invitations for campus visits. He attended 16 kicking camps during his junior/senior summer. On 6 June he attended an Indiana University camp and received a full scholarship offer from the Hoosiers. Subsequently, at the University of Michigan camp, he averaged 48.5 yards per punt and a 4.6 second average hang time and was offered a scholarship. During the visit he impressed coaches when he saw fifth-year punter Adam Finley kicking balls on the roof of the Michigan indoor practice facility and joined in by kicking four in a row over the building. He was also admitted to all of the Ivy League schools.

Meskó had a successful high school career and was ranked second among kickers in the 2005 recruiting class by Rivals.com and fourth among punters by Scout.com. He committed to Michigan on 28 June 2004, just before his senior year of high school. He committed to Michigan mainly as a punter. After committing to Michigan, he continued to be recruited by the Ohio State Buckeyes, and the USC Trojans. Over the course of his high school career, he evolved from a 155-pound (70.3 kg), 6-foot-3-inch (1.91 m) freshman into a 240-pound (108.9 kg), 6-foot-4-inch (1.93 m) senior.

As a senior, Meskó once punted a ball 70 yards in the air. As a senior punter and placekicker, Meskó was a part of the focus of opposition game plans. He averaged 44 yards per punt as a senior and dropped 16 inside the 10-yard line according to The Plain Dealer and 15 inside the 15-yard line according to the Ann Arbor News. He was selected to play on 15 January 2005 U.S. Army All-American Bowl as a punter. During the game, he drew a roughing the kicker penalty and posted seven punts including kicks of 56, 48 and 47 yards and a pooch punt that he placed inside the 15-yard line. He was named an Associated Press Division II All-Ohio first-team punter. He was also selected to numerous local area All-star teams as both a punter and a placekicker. He served as both punter and kicker for the Ohio team during the 2005 Big 33 Football Classic in which he was 4 for 5 on PATs. He was recognized as the 2004 Northeast Inland All-District Division II first team punter by the media. He was selected as the All-Akron Beacon Journal team placekicker and the all-Summit County punter. The Akron area coaches selected him as both the punter and kicker for the All-Western Reserve Conference, North Division first-team. He was selected to the combined Summit-Medina-Portage Counties All-Area team as the first team punter by The Plain Dealer. He was the first team punter for The Plain Dealer All-area team. Although Meskó's high school required 40 hours of community service, he performed over 300 hours.

College recruiting
Name	Hometown	School	Height	Weight	40^{‡}	Commit date
Zoltán Meskó; P	Twinsburg, Ohio	Twinsburg (OH)	6 ft 4 in (1.93 m)	230 lb (100 kg)	--	Jun 28, 2004
Zoltán Meskó; P	Recruit ratings: Scout: Rivals:					
Overall recruit ranking: Scout: 4 (P) Rivals: 2 (PK/P), 36 (OH)
Note: In many cases, Scout, Rivals, 247Sports, On3, and ESPN may conflict in their listings of height and weight.; In these cases, the average was taken. ESPN grades are on a 100-point scale.; Sources: "Michigan Football Commitments". Rivals.; "2005 Michigan Football Commits". Scout.; "ESPN". ESPN.; "Scout.com Team Recruiting Rankings". Scout.; "2005 Team Ranking". Rivals.com.

== College career ==
=== Lloyd Carr era ===
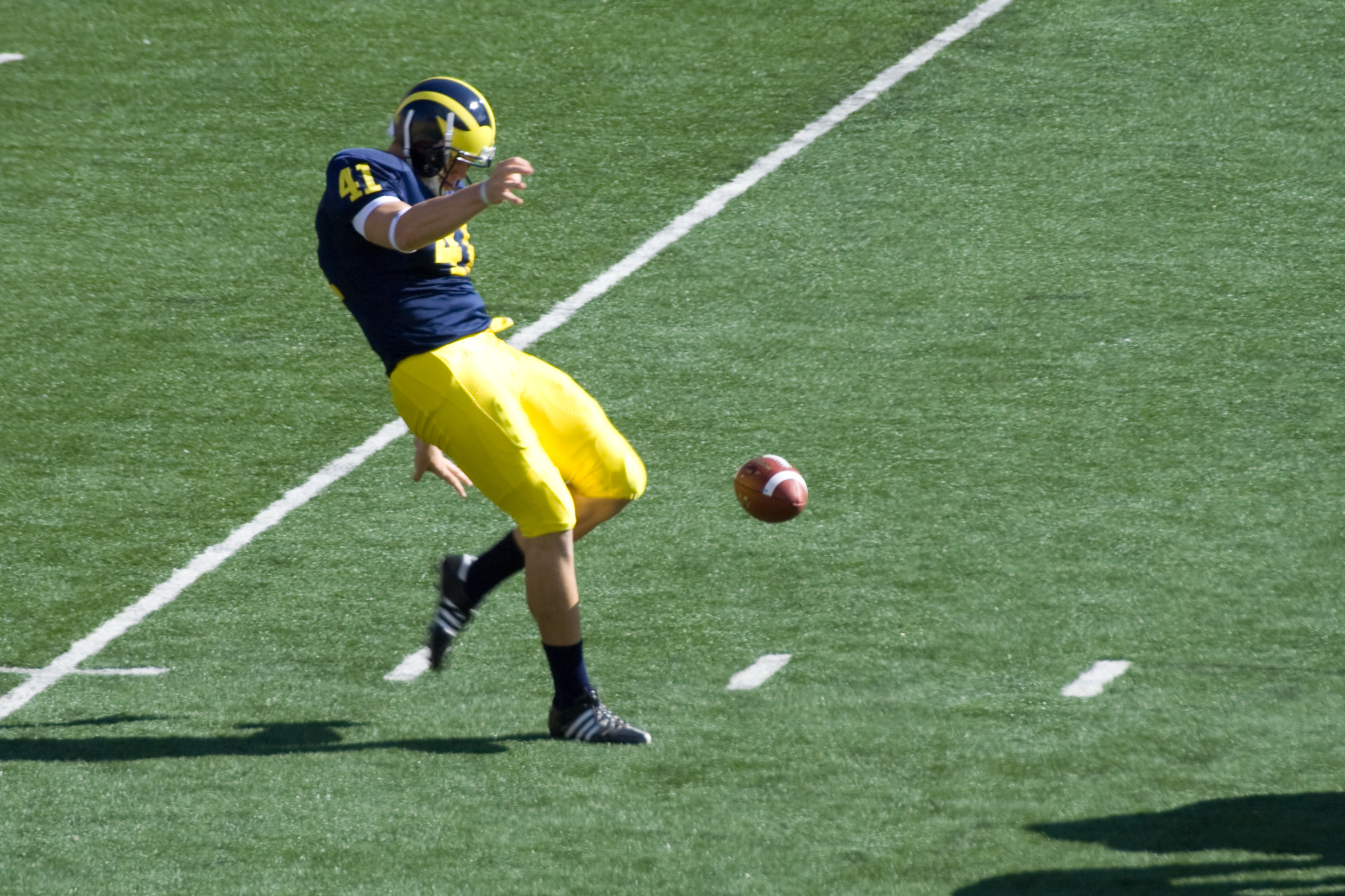
Meskó punts as a Michigan Wolverine.

Prior to the 2005 season, it appeared that the Michigan Wolverines would use three kickers: Garrett Rivas for field goals and extra points, Ross Ryan for kickoffs and Meskó for punting, but redshirt junior Ryan beat out Meskó and junior Mark Spencer for the punting duties. Meskó redshirted as a freshman at Michigan in 2005, while Ryan ranked last in the Big Ten for the 2005 season with a 38.3 yard average.

Entering the 2006 season for Michigan, head coach Lloyd Carr could not decide between Meskó and Ryan. In the team's opening game against Vanderbilt, Meskó punted three times and Ryan once. The two shared the kicking duties for the first four games with Meskó recording 12 punts and Ryan recording 9. In the fifth game of the season, against the Minnesota Golden Gophers for the Little Brown Jug, Meskó handled all of the punting duties. Ryan punted only five more times the rest of the season. Meskó finished the season fourth in the Big Ten and 38th in the nation in punting average. Meskó earned Academic All-Big Ten Conference recognition for earning a letter while maintaining a 3.0+ average during the fall.

Prior to the 2007 season, Meskó adjusted his kicking technique to a straight motion instead of a cross-over like National Football League punters. He was a preseason Ray Guy Award watchlist nominee. After Rivas graduated, the 2007 Michigan Wolverines football team had a battle for the placekicking duties for the 2007 season between redshirt freshman Bryan Wright and two walk-ons. When the team had two fourth quarter field goal attempts blocked during their season-opening 34–32 loss to the two-time defending FCS champion Appalachian State Mountaineers, Meskó was an uninvolved third stringer but handled punting duties. Meskó finished the season fifth in the Big Ten in punting average, and was again Academic All-Conference.

=== Rich Rodriguez era ===
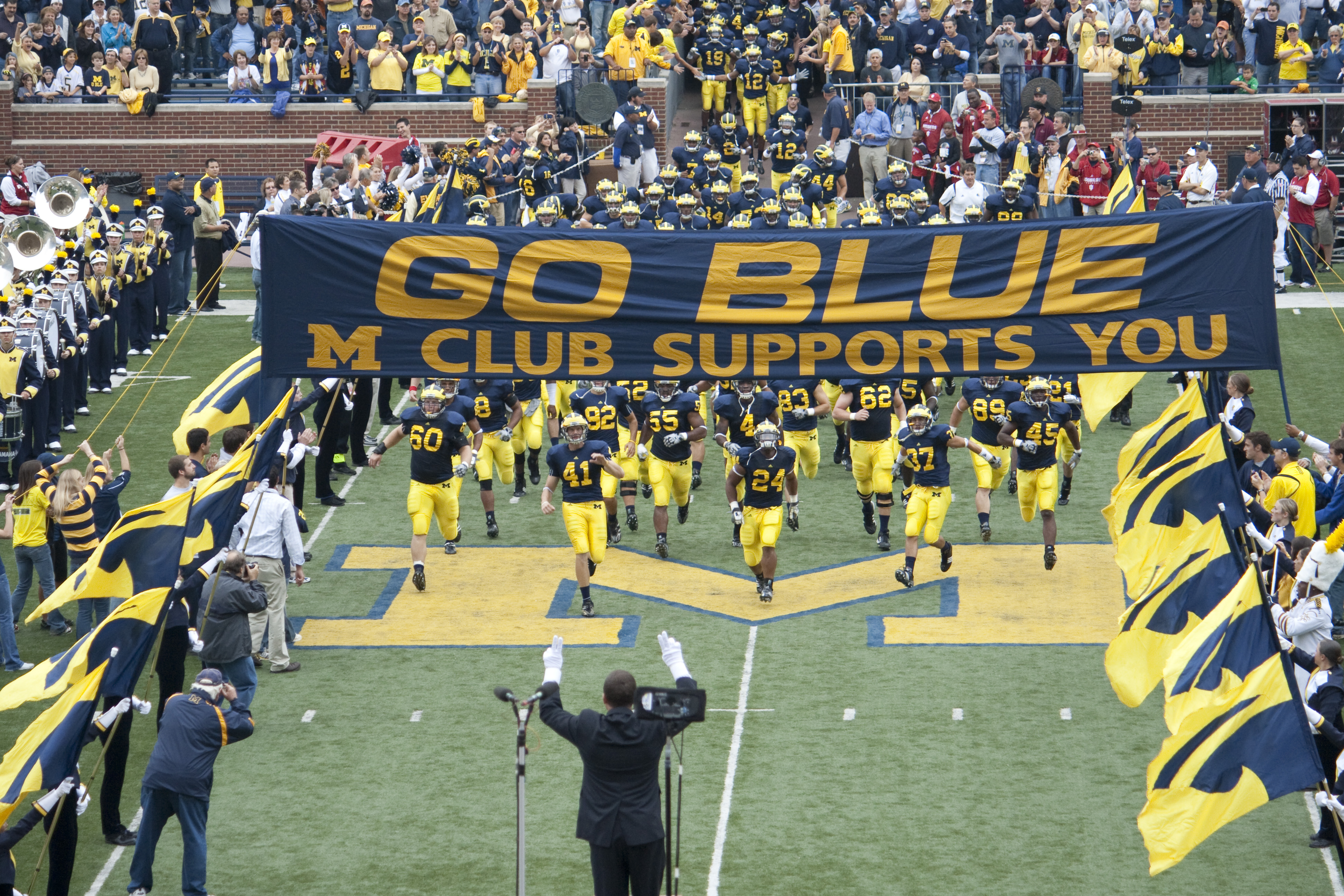
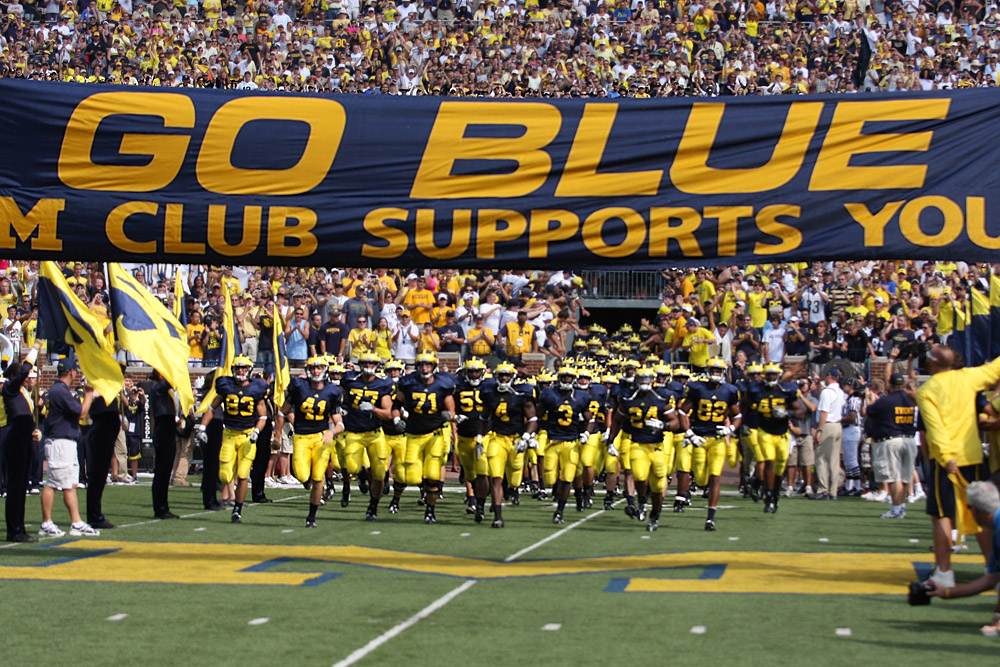
Co-captain Meskó led the 2009 Michigan Wolverines football team onto the field (above 26 September and below 5 September)

When Rich Rodriguez arrived to replace the retired Carr prior to the 2008 season, he announced the Wolverines would be using a new punting formation along with the spread offense. Instead of using two gunners, the team switched to using six, and Meskó switched to rolling out and using directional kicks. The plan called for a mixture of employing traditional pocket punts and roll out for rugby style ones. Meskó said the changes to the team were so drastic under Rodriguez that he felt like he had transferred. On all seven of his punts in the opening game against Utah, Meskó rolled out to his left before punting. The new punt scheme was part of the option offense and could have resulted in a fake punt. In Michigan's third game against Notre Dame on 13 September, Meskó executed an option run for 13 yards and a first down. Meskó also executed a seven-yard option run for a first down against Minnesota on 8 November in the Little Brown Jug game. Meskó had a couple of punts blocked during the season, and one was returned for a touchdown during the Michigan – Ohio State game. During the season, Meskó served as K.C. Lopata's holder on placekicks. Meskó repeated a Guy Award watchlist candidate in 2008. After the list was narrowed from fifty to ten, Meskó was a semifinalist for the award. Meskó led the Big Ten in punting average and finished twentieth in the nation. He was named to the Big Ten All Conference First-Team in 2008. He was recognized by Phil Steele as a fourth team All-American for 2008. Meskó was Academic All-Conference for a third time. At the conclusion of the 2008–09 academic year, the inaugural class of Big Ten Distinguished Scholars was recognized for having attained a 3.7 GPA for the academic year while earning varsity letters, and Meskó was among the honorees.

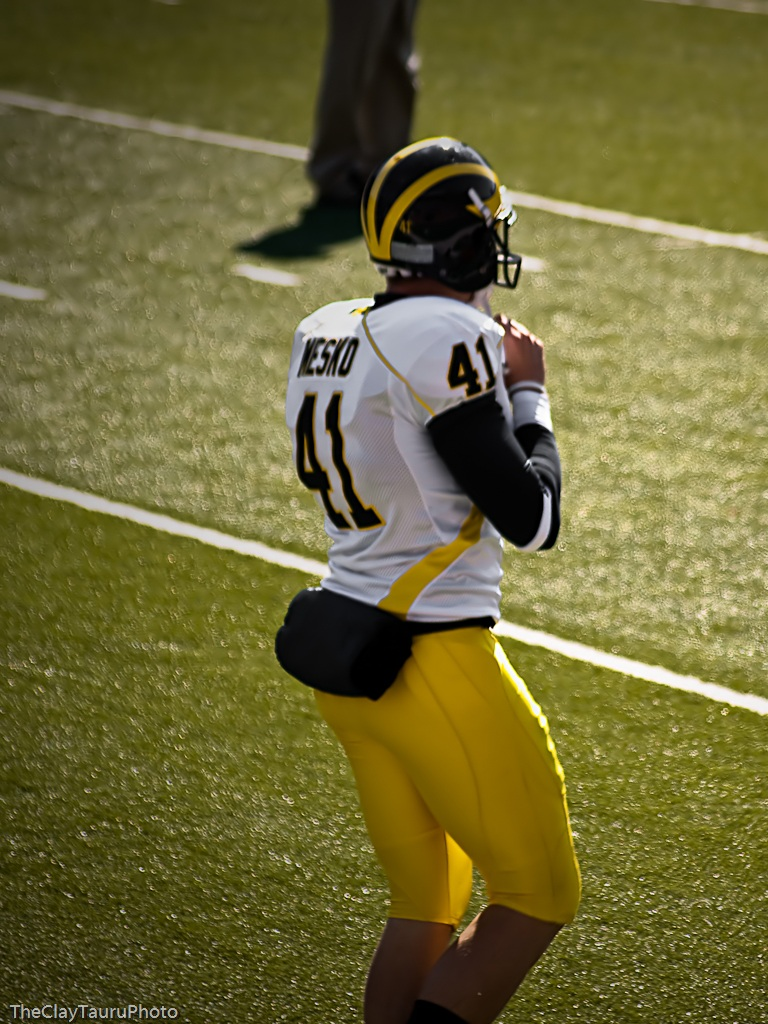
Meskó at 2009 Michigan spring practice

As a senior, Meskó entered the 2009 NCAA Division I FBS football season opener with the most career starts (38) on the 2009 Michigan Wolverines football team. He served as the first special teams performer to be captain in the 130-year history of Michigan football. In 2009, Meskó was again a Guy Award watchlist candidate for the Wolverines. He was also a pre-season Playboy All-American and NationalChamps.net first-team All-American. On 11 October 2009, he was named Big Ten Conference special teams player of the week for averaging 53.8 yards on five punts at Iowa. He was a 2009 Allstate Good Works Team honoree for his outstanding civic contributions to the local community and a 2009 Lowe's Senior Class Award Finalist for classroom, community, character and competition excellence. At the midpoint in the Wolverines' Big Ten schedule, Meskó ranked fifth in the nation and first in the Big Ten in punting average. In November, Meskó was named one of 10 semifinalists for the Ray Guy Award and one of 12 finalists for the Wuerffel Trophy. In eight conference games Meskó averaged 45.2 yards/punt, which was the first time a Michigan punter led the Big Ten in Conference game punting average since Paul Staroba in 1970. Although the team played twelve games, Meskó only accumulated stats in eleven since the team did not punt a single time in its 17 October 63–6 victory against the Delaware State Hornets. He was selected by both the coaches and the media to the first-team All-Big Ten Conference team. Meskó was named one of three finalists for the Ray Guy Award along with Drew Butler and Chaz Henry. Meskó was honored as a fall term of the 2009-10 Academic All-Conference selection. He was also one of fifteen Football Bowl Subdivision athletes and six Big Ten athletes selected as a first-team Academic All-American. He was the second-team All-American punter selection by the Walter Camp Football Foundation, the Associated Press, Scout.com, and Rivals.com. He was an honorable mention All-American by Sports Illustrated, Pro Football Weekly, and College Football News. He finished the season ranked eighth in the nation and first in the Big Ten in punting average. On 31 December 2009, he was one of 22 players recognized as a member of the Allstate AFCA Good Works Team, which rewards public service and volunteer work.

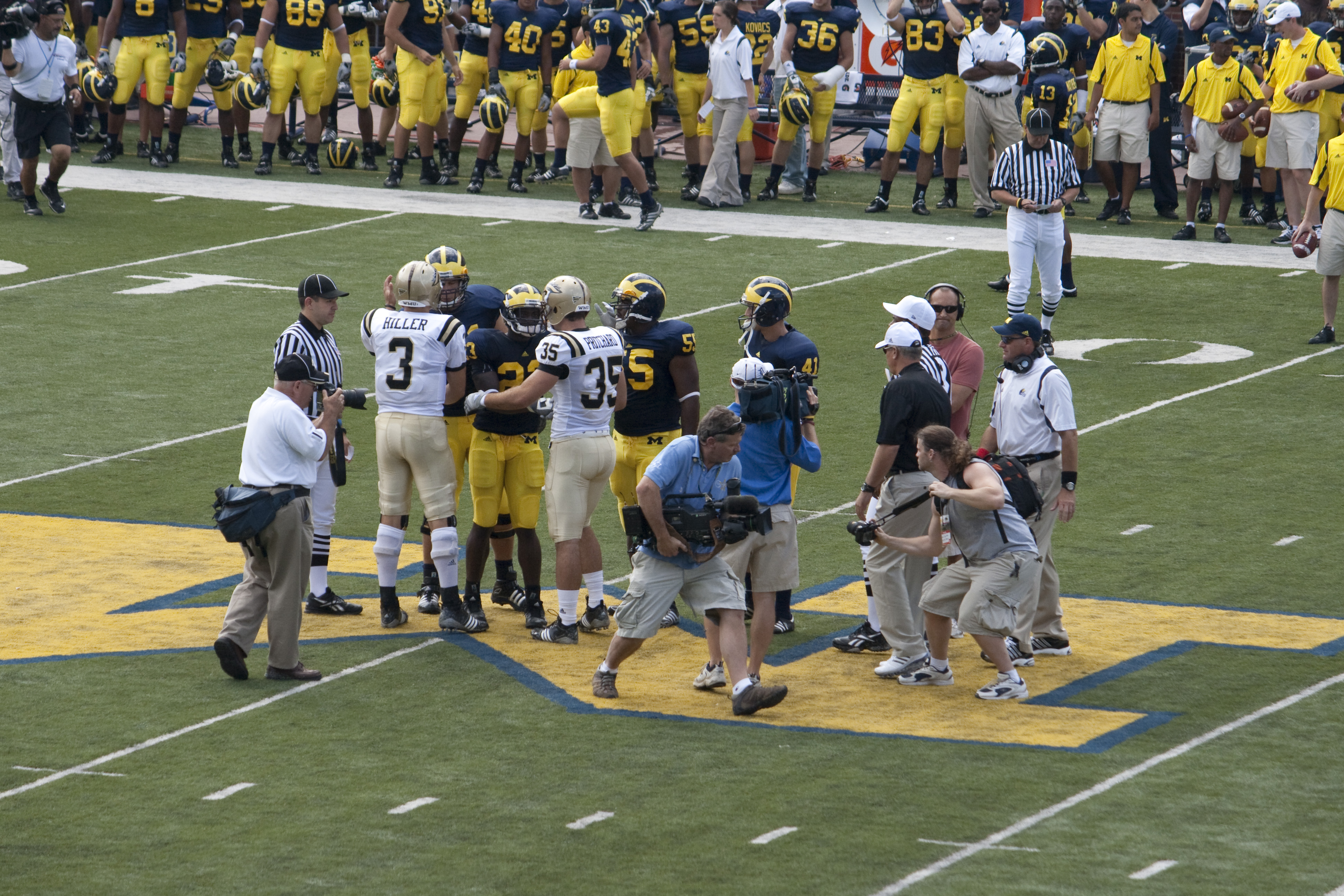
Meskó during pregame coin toss with teammates Carlos Brown, Brandon Graham and Mark Ortmann as well as Tim Hiller.

Meskó is Michigan's career leader in punts and punting yardage and is second only to Monte Robbins in punting average. He is also the Michigan single-season punts (80) and punting yards (3436) record holder. His 44.46 was a school single-season record that lasted three years until Will Hagerup surpassed it. Meskó ranks ninth all-time in career punts and seventh in punting yardage in Big Ten Conference history. At the close of his collegiate career, Meskó was rated the number one punter prospect for the 2010 NFL draft by Scouts.com.

=== Statistics ===
			Punting			
Season	Team	GP	Punts	Avg	Long	Yds
2006	Michigan	13	50	41.6	64	2,079
2007	Michigan	13	70	41.1	68	2,876
2008	Michigan	12	80	43.0	63	3,436
2009	Michigan	12	52	44.5	66	2,312
Total		50	252	42.5	68	10,703

== Professional career ==
=== Pre-draft ===
Pre-draft measurables
Height	Weight	Arm length	Hand span	Bench press
6 ft 4 1/2 in (1.94 m)	240 lb (109 kg)	34 in (0.86 m)	10 in (0.25 m)	16 reps
All values from NFL Scouting Combine.

Meskó ranked second among all specialists at the NFL Combine with 16 repetitions on the bench press.

=== New England Patriots ===
==== 2010 to 2012 ====
Meskó was selected by the New England Patriots in the fifth round (150th overall) of the 2010 NFL draft. He was the first punter or placekicker drafted and the second Wolverine drafted (Brandon Graham was the first) in the 2010 draft. He signed a four-year contract on 16 June 2010.

In Week 6 of his rookie season, Meskó set a season-long record with a 65-yard punt in overtime that gave the Baltimore Ravens the ball at their own 19-yard line. The Ravens failed to gain a first down and punted back to the Patriots, who scored to win the game on the ensuing drive.

The 2010 Patriots were the seventh-highest scoring team in NFL history; as a result, Meskó punted just 58 times, 26th in the league. Of those punts, 19 were downed inside the 20, while 5 were touchbacks. Meskó finished his rookie season with a gross punting average of 43.2 yards, and net average of 38.4 yards, the highest net average for a rookie in NFL history. During the 2011 NFL lockout, Meskó, a finance and marketing major in college, interned as a private equity analyst with Graham Partners in Philadelphia. Meskó also served as the Patriots' holder.

At the end of the 2011 season, Meskó and the Patriots appeared in Super Bowl XLVI. He had three punts for 123 net yards (41.0 average), but the Patriots lost 21–17 to the New York Giants.

==== 2013 preseason ====
Meskó was fighting for the punter position with undrafted rookie Ryan Allen. Meskó did not survive the final cuts. Bleacher Report stated that the reason for the cut was that if Meskó had stayed for his fourth year, he would have made $1.3 million, while Allen would only cost $405,000.

=== Pittsburgh Steelers ===
On 2 September 2013, Meskó was signed to the Pittsburgh Steelers active roster. Meskó had grown up a Steelers fan although he lived in Cleveland and wore a Steelers jacket during his youth. Meskó was released from the Steelers on 29 October 2013. Meskó's punting had been statistically poor and he had some troubles on specific plays that upset Steelers coach Mike Tomlin. Meskó was replaced by Mat McBriar.

=== Cincinnati Bengals ===
On 31 December 2013, after a punt by Shawn Powell went only 10 yards, Meskó was signed by the Cincinnati Bengals. His contract was not renewed at the end of the season, becoming a free agent. He had workouts with the New York Jets and Washington Redskins in early 2014, but was not signed.

== Personal life ==
Meskó is of Hungarian descent. In the mid-1990s, his parents, Mihály and Erzsébet Meskó, were highly educated engineers in Romania. The family supplemented its income selling homemade clothes in the market. His father was also a professional nine-pin bowler. On 8 May 1997, when Zoltán was 11, his family moved from his native Romania after Mihály Meskó won a United States Permanent Resident Card (green card) in the Diversity Immigrant Visa lottery for the single child family to move to the United States. The Meskós now have jobs that pay well. The family spent the first year and half in New York City before moving to Ohio for better jobs. Zoltán speaks Hungarian, Romanian, German and English and is conversant in Spanish. He learned to speak English by watching television. He was schooled at a German school in Timișoara, which was then Romania's second-largest city. His parents taught him Hungarian and he spoke Romanian with his friends.

Meskó completed a Bachelor of Business Administration in finance and marketing from the University of Michigan's Ross School of Business in 2009. He completed a master's degree in sports management from the University of Michigan School of Kinesiology in April 2010. Meskó is Roman Catholic and wears a medallion of his patron saint, St. Anthony of Padua. In June 2013, he appeared on Barstool Sports's Bro Show with Dave Portnoy and Dan "Big Cat" Katz, punting to the bloggers.

Meskó married his wife Haley in 2014.

After retiring from the NFL, Meskó started Exero Labs with business partner Ben Rizzo, a company that aims to create devices attached to football helmets to make the game safer. They were featured on the NFL's technology startup competition "1st and Future" the weekend of Super Bowl LII.
