= Highland Local School District =

School district in Medina County, Ohio, USA

Highland Local School District is a public school district mainly in Medina County, Ohio with a small portion in neighboring Summit County. The district was established in 1952 by consolidating the rural Hinckley, Granger, and Sharon school districts. It covers most of Hinckley, Granger, and Sharon townships and parts of Montville, Copley, Medina, and Brunswick Hills townships.

== Schools ==
=== Elementary schools ===
- Granger Elementary School, grades Preschool–5 (1724 Wilbur Rd, Medina)
- Hinckley Elementary School, grades K–5 (1157 Ridge Rd, Hinckley)
- Sharon Elementary School, grades K–5 (6216 Ridge Rd, Wadsworth)

=== Middle schools ===
- Highland Middle School, grades 6–8 (3880 Ridge Rd, Medina)

=== High schools ===
- Highland High School, grades 9–12 (4150 Ridge Rd, Medina)

In July 1970 a portion of the Revere Local School District was transferred to the Highland district.
