= John M. Annis House =

Historic house in Ohio, United States

- U.S. National Register of Historic Places
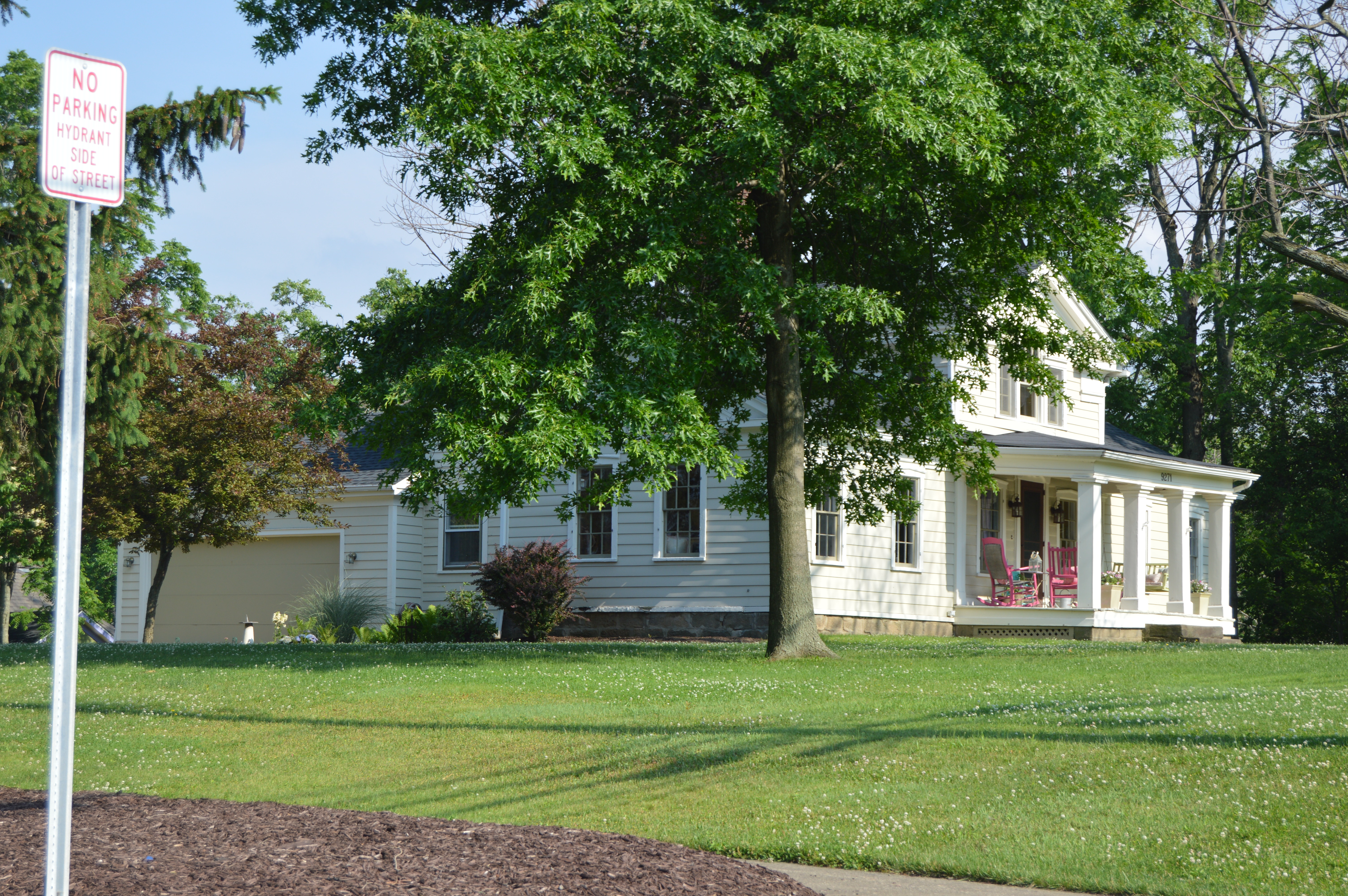
- Front and northern side

- Location within Ohio Location within the United States
- Location: 9271 State Road; North Royalton, Ohio; United States
- Coordinates: 41°20′31.5″N 81°43′27″W
- Architect: John Mclintock Annis
- Architectural style: Greek Revival
- NRHP reference No.: 92000174
- Added to NRHP: March 19, 1992

The John M. Annis House is an American registered historic building, located in North Royalton, Ohio. It was listed in the U.S. National Register of Historic Places on March 19, 1992.

John McClintock Annis was born on February 26, 1804, in Phelps, New York, the son of Stephen and Christin Annis. Stephen (1776–1846) moved first to Phelps, New York before 1804, and then to Elyria, Ohio, where he raised his family.

John's lineage is: Stephen Annis (1776–1846), Thomas Annis (1750–1809), Daniel Annis (1711–1790), Abraham Annis (1668–1738) and Cormac Annis (1638–1717).

== Historic uses ==
- Single-family detached home
