= Dan France =

American football player (born 1991)

No. 59
- Position: Offensive tackle

Personal information
- Born: April 1, 1991 (age 35); Fairview Park, Ohio, U.S.
- Listed height: 6 ft 6 in (1.98 m)
- Listed weight: 312 lb (142 kg)

Career information
- High school: North Royalton (OH)
- College: Michigan State
- NFL draft: 2014: undrafted

Career history
- Cincinnati Bengals (2014–2015)*; Cleveland Browns (2015–2016)*; Carolina Panthers (2016–2017)
- * Offseason or practice squad member only
- Stats at Pro Football Reference

Daniel Joseph France (born April 1, 1991) is an American former football offensive tackle. He played college football at Michigan State. He was originally signed by the Cincinnati Bengals as an undrafted free agent in 2014.

== Early life ==
France attended North Royalton High School in North Royalton, Ohio. He was a three-year starter for North Royalton's basketball and football teams. France played both defensive end and tight end for head coach Nick Ciulli and excelled at both positions. He was ranked the nation's #21 strong side defensive end by Rivals.com, OhioVarsity.com's #6 tight end in Ohio, OhioVarsity.com's top blocking tight end in the state, Rivals.com's #22 senior player in Ohio, and the Plain Dealer's #13 senior in the state. France was also voted to Prepstar's and Superprep's All-Midwest teams.

He received offers from Michigan State, Indiana, Iowa, NC State, Purdue, Northwestern, Stanford, and Vanderbilt. On August 4, 2008, he officially committed to Michigan State.

== College career ==
=== 2009 ===
France attended Michigan State University from 2009 to 2013. He redshirted his first year as a true freshman.

=== 2010 ===
In 2010, he played as a defensive tackle behind Jerel Worthy and Anthony White. He made his collegiate debut in the Spartan's season opener against Western Michigan and finished the victory with two tackles, a quarterback hurry, and a pass break-up. He played in seven games during the season. During the team's bowl practices, he began practicing as an offensive lineman.

=== 2011 ===
The following season, France fully transitioned to offensive lineman and was projected as the Spartan's starting left tackle going into preseason camp after impressing his coaches during spring practice. on September 10, 2011, he made his first career start and collegiate debut at left tackle against Florida Atlantic. He finished his sophomore season with 29 knockdowns and started 13 games.

=== 2012 ===
He remained as Michigan State's starting left tackle to begin his junior season. He started 11 games during the regular season and played in 90% of Michigan State's offensive snaps. He missed the Spartan's annual rivalry game against Michigan due to a concussion. He totaled 36 knockdowns during 2012.

=== 2013 ===
After starting the previous two season at offensive tackle, France was switched to an offensive guard during spring practice. He started all 13 games at right guard but missed the Rose Bowl against Stanford due to a lower leg injury. He finished his last season at Michigan State with a career high 69.5 knockdowns, was an All-Big Ten selection by the coaches and media, and was twice voted the Spartan's offensive lineman of the week.

He finished his collegiate career with 46 game appearances and 37 starts, 119.5 knockdowns, and 25 dominators. During his time at Michigan State, he blocked for teammates and future NFL players Kirk Cousins, Le'Veon Bell, and Jeremy Langford.

== Professional career ==
France was not invited to the NFL combine but did perform at Michigan State's annual pro day on March 11, 2014.

Pre-draft measurables
Height	Weight	40-yard dash	10-yard split	20-yard split	20-yard shuttle	Three-cone drill	Vertical jump	Broad jump	Bench press
6 ft 5 in (1.96 m)	300 lb (136 kg)	5.45 s	1.95 s	3.15 s	4.70 s	7.69 s	28 in (0.71 m)	8 ft 6 in (2.59 m)	27 reps
All values from Michigan State's Pro Day

=== Cincinnati Bengals ===
After going undrafted in the 2014 NFL draft, France was signed by the Cincinnati Bengals as an undrafted free agent on May 12, 2014. On August 30, 2014, he was waived by the Bengals and was signed to their practice squad the following day. On January 6, 2015, signed a reserve/future contract with the Bengals.

On September 5, 2015, France was waived by the Bengals and was signed to their practice squad the next day. He was released by the Bengals on November 30, 2015.

=== Cleveland Browns ===
On December 2, 2015, the Cleveland Browns signed France to their practice squad. He signed a reserve/future contract with the Browns on January 5, 2016. France united with his former Cincinnati Bengals' offensive coordinator Hue Jackson when he was hired as the Browns' new head coach on January 13, 2016. On September 3, 2016, the Browns waived him as a part of their final roster cuts and he was signed to their practice squad the next day.

=== Carolina Panthers ===
On November 29, 2016, France was signed to the Carolina Panthers' active roster from the Browns' practice squad after the Panthers suffered numerous injuries to their offensive linemen, including Michael Oher, Ryan Kalil, and Gino Gradkowski.

On September 1, 2017, France was placed on injured reserve.

== Personal life ==
He was raised by his parents, John and Judy France, and majored in hospitality business at Michigan State. During high school, France umpired baseball games for 7-8 year old youth games. He is able to kick field goals and has made one from 50-yards. France is also a fan of the Red Hot Chili Peppers, Family Guy, and Forrest Gump and cites golf as one of his hobbies. He is engaged to be married to his fiancée Kelsey in 2017.
