= Highland High School (Medina, Ohio) =

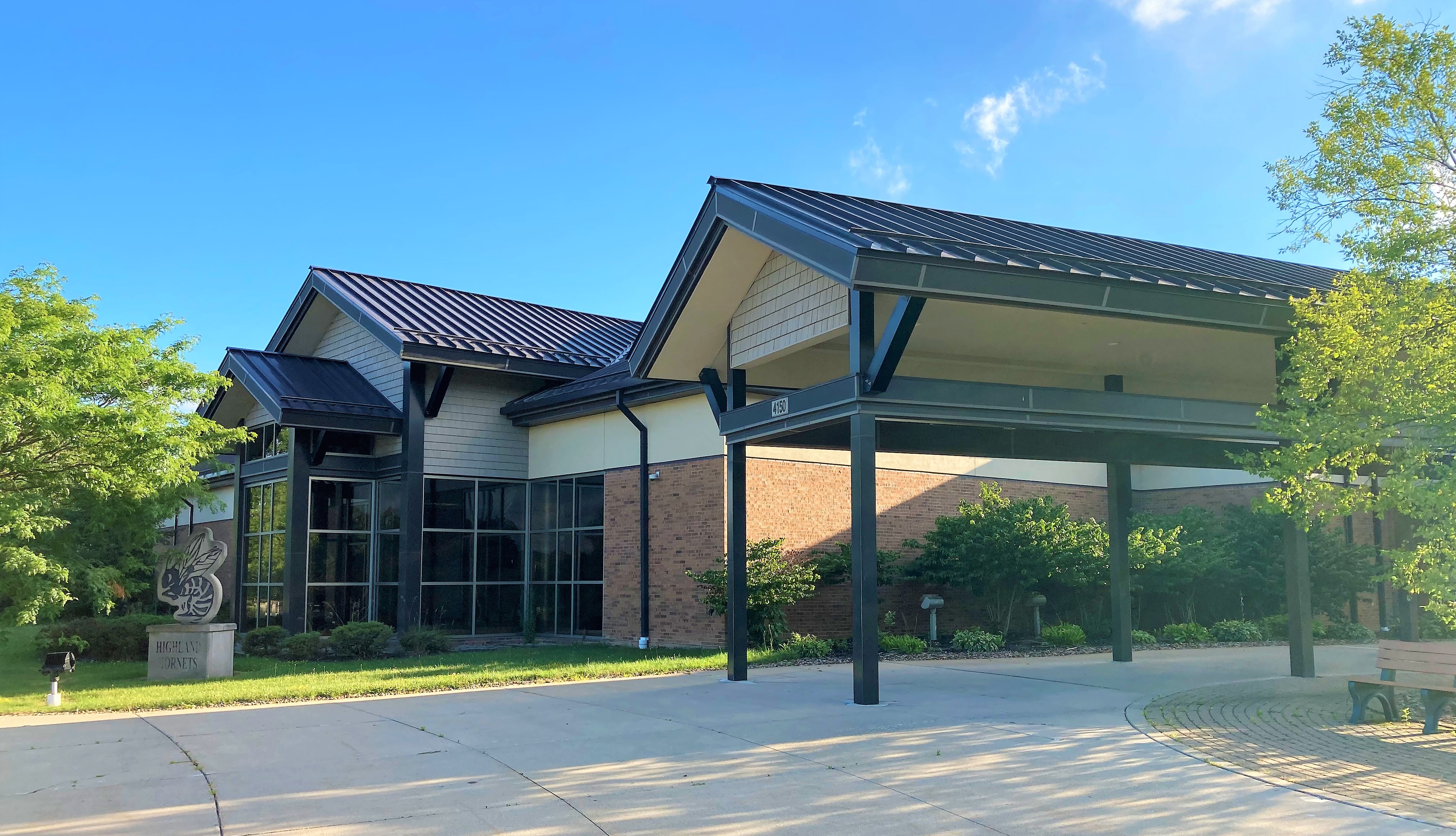

Location
- 4150 Ridge Road; Medina, Ohio 44256; United States
- Coordinates: 41°09′47″N 81°44′34″W

Information
- Funding type: Public
- Established: 1952
- School district: Highland Local School District
- Principal: Carrie Knapp
- Teaching staff: 51.50 (FTE
- Grades: 9–12
- Enrollment: 989 (2024–25)
- Student to teacher ratio: 19.20
- Campus size: 280.365 acres (113.460 ha)
- Campus type: Rural
- Colors: Green and black
- Athletics conference: Suburban League
- Team name: Hornets
- Newspaper: The Stinger
- Website: highschool.highlandschools.org

Highland High School is a public high school in Granger Township, near Medina, Ohio, United States. It is the only high school in the Highland Local School District. Athletic teams are known as the Hornets and they compete in the Ohio High School Athletic Association as a member of the Suburban League.

== History ==
Opened in 1952, Highland High School serves students grades 9-12

Highland was formed as a result of a consolidation of neighboring Hinckley, Granger and Sharon School districts in 1952.

== Accolades and awards ==
In 2022, Highland High School was ranked by #1,055 nationally and #41 in Ohio by U.S. News.

== Athletics ==
Highland High School currently offers:

- Baseball
- Basketball
- Bowling
- Cheerleading
- Cross Country
- Golf
- Girls Flag Football
- Football
- Soccer
- Softball
- Tennis
- Track and field
- Volleyball
- Wrestling

In August 2015, Highland High School built a new athletic complex. This complex includes a football stadium featuring a turf field, eight lane track, locker room facilities, multiple restroom facilities, multiple food vending facilities, a video scoreboard, and seating for 5,000 people, as well as tennis courts, and additional parking areas. The stadium was constructed on land that was being used as a practice field for the marching band, and the tennis courts were constructed west of the new stadium where a wooded area was previously. This project is projected to cost seven to eight million dollars with most of the funding coming from private sources.

=== State championships ===
Girls volleyball - 1981

== Notable alumni ==
- Daryl Morey, general manager in the National Basketball Association (NBA)
- Luke Raley, professional baseball player in Major League Baseball
- Jim Ritcher, professional football player in the National Football League (NFL)
- Matt Tifft, professional stock car racing driver in NASCAR

== Notes and references ==
7. MC-GIS http://gm.medinaco.org/ Retrieved February 4, 2022
