= Suburban League =

High school athletics league in northeastern Ohio, United States

The Suburban League is an Ohio High School Athletic Association (OHSAA) athletics league made up of 16 high schools from Cuyahoga, Geauga, Medina, Portage, and Summit counties in Northeast Ohio. It was formed in 1949 and expanded into two divisions in 2015.

== Current members ==
School	Nickname	Location	Colors	Tenure	Notes
National Conference
Brecksville–Broadview Heights	Bees	Broadview Heights, Cuyahoga County	Crimson, gold	2015–	In American for football
Highland	Hornets	Granger, Medina County	Green, black	1956–1957, (Note: Highland was a football-only member for the 1956 and 1957 football seasons) 1976–	Moved from American to National in 2026
Hudson	Explorers	Hudson, Summit County	Navy, white	1949–1997, 2015–	
Medina	Battling Bees	Medina	Green & white	2026–	
North Royalton	Bears	North Royalton, Cuyahoga County	Purple, gold	2015–	
Solon	Comets	Solon, Cuyahoga County	Navy, white	2023– (Note: All sports except football, which joined in 2024)	
Stow–Munroe Falls	Bulldogs	Stow, Summit County	Maroon, gold	2015–	
Wadsworth	Grizzlies	Wadsworth, Medina County	Red, white	1984–	
American Conference
Aurora	Greenmen	Aurora, Portage County	Dark green, white	2015–	
Barberton	Magics	Barberton, Summit County	Purple, white	2005–2011, 2015–	
Copley	Indians	Copley, Summit County	Blue, gold	1949–	
Kenston	Bombers	Bainbridge	Blue & white	2026–	
Mayfield	Wildcats	Mayfield	Green & white	2026–	
Nordonia	Knights	Macedonia, Summit County	Green, white	1949–1973, 2011–	In National for football, moved from National to American in 2026
Revere	Minutemen	Richfield, Summit County	Red, blue, white	1958–	
Twinsburg	Tigers	Twinsburg, Summit County	Blue, white	1958–1964, 2015–	Moved from National to American in 2026

== Former members ==
School	Nickname	Location	Colors	Tenure	Notes
Cloverleaf	Colts	Westfield, Medina County	Green, white	1997–2015	Left for Portage Trail Conference
Coventry	Comets	Coventry, Summit County	Blue, gold	1969–1983	Left for All-Ohio Conference
Cuyahoga Falls	Black Tigers	Cuyahoga Falls, Summit County	Black, gold	2015–2026	Left for Metro Athletic Conference
Field	Falcons	Brimfield, Portage County	Red, white, black	1978–1990	Left for Portage County League
Green	Bulldogs	Green, Summit County	Orange, black	1949–2015	Left for Federal League
Manchester	Panthers	New Franklin, Summit County	Red, black	1949–1976	Left for All-Ohio Conference
Mogadore	Wildcats	Mogadore, Summit County	Green, white	1958–1968	Left for Portage County League
Norton	Panthers	Norton, Summit County	Red, black, white	1972–2005	Left for Portage Trail Conference
Kent Roosevelt	Rough Riders	Kent, Portage County	Red, white, black	2015–2026	Left for Metro Athletic Conference
Tallmadge	Blue Devils	Tallmadge, Summit County	Blue, gold	1990–2026	Left for Metro Athletic Conference
Woodridge	Bulldogs	Cuyahoga Falls, Summit County	Maroon, silver	1958–1978	Left for Portage County League

== Membership timeline ==
Full members Associate members (football only)

== History ==
The Suburban League was established in 1949 by the larger high schools in the Summit County League. The original charter members were Copley, Green, Hudson, Manchester, and Northfield–Macedonia. In 1956, Highland joined for football only and competed for the '56 and '57 titles. The league expanded to nine schools in 1958 with the additions of Mogadore, Revere, Twinsburg Chamberlin, (Note: The high school in Twinsburg was known as Chamberlin High School or Twinsburg Chamberlin from 1958 to 1999) and Boston.

1962 saw two changes to league members as Northfield–Macedonia, which had been referred to as "Nor-Mac" or "Nor-Donia," became Nordonia, while Boston consolidated into the new Woodridge High School with Woodridge taking the place of Boston in Suburban League membership. Twinsburg Chamberlin left the league for the Chagrin Valley Conference in 1964, followed by Mogadore for the Portage County League in 1968, which dropped membership to seven schools for one season. Coventry joined from the Metro League in 1969 and membership returned to nine schools with Norton joining from the Metro League in 1972, but only for one year as Nordonia left in 1973 for the Metro League. League membership remained stable at eight schools for the remainder of the 1970s and into the 2000s despite several changes, beginning in 1976 when Manchester left the league for the All-Ohio Conference. They were replaced the same year by Highland, which had competed as a football-only member of the league in 1956 and 1957. In 1978, Woodridge left the league for the Portage County League and was replaced that year by Field, which joined from the Metro League. Membership again dropped to seven schools for one season after Coventry left in 1983, but Wadsworth joined in 1984 to return to eight member schools. The next change was in 1990 when Field left for the Portage County League and was replaced that same year by Tallmadge, which joined from the Metro League. Later that decade in 1997, charter member Hudson left the league after nearly 50 years to join the new Western Reserve Conference. They were replaced by Cloverleaf that same year.

During the early 2000s, the only changes in membership occurred in 2005 when Norton left the league to join the new Portage Trail Conference. They were replaced that year by Barberton, which left the Western Reserve Conference. Barberton's membership, however, ended up being brief and controversial. In early 2009, Barberton announced it would leave the league in 2011, with Barberton superintendent John Hall stating "we recognize our disagreements over athletics philosophies and approach must take precedence over league affiliation." He also added "We will become stronger by divorcing partners that never saw us as equals regardless of our successes.” There was also speculation that the league had asked Barberton to withdraw and that other changes were on the horizon for high school conferences in the area. Barberton left in 2011 and was replaced that year by Suburban League charter member Nordonia, which had been a member of the Northeast Ohio Conference (NOC). At the time of Nordonia's departure from the NOC, there were rumors that several NOC schools, particularly Stow–Munroe Falls, Hudson, Cuyahoga Falls, and Twinsburg, had expressed dissatisfaction with the structure of the conference.

=== Expansion and reorganization ===
The rumors of dissatisfaction with the NOC and other changes in high school athletics proved true and resulted in the largest changes for the league since it was established. In August 2013, charter member Green, which had played in the Suburban League for nearly 65 years, announced it would leave to join the Federal League in 2015. Five days after the announcement from Green, nine schools—Aurora, Barberton, Brecksville–Broadview Heights, Cuyahoga Falls, Hudson, Kent Roosevelt, North Royalton, Stow–Munroe Falls, and Twinsburg—were asked to consider joining a newly aligned Suburban League that would include divisions based on enrollment. Barberton, Kent Roosevelt, and North Royalton announced on September 16, 2013, they would join the Suburban League with Barberton and North Royalton beginning in the 2015–16 school year. Kent Roosevelt initially announced they would begin in the 2016–17 season, but later changed to 2015–16. Two days later on September 18, Aurora, Brecksville–Broadview Heights, Cuyahoga Falls, Hudson, Stow–Munroe Falls, and Twinsburg announced they would look to join the league in 2015–16. Later that year in December, Cloverleaf announced it would leave for the Portage Trail Conference (PTC) in 2015.

Cloverleaf departed for the PTC and Green to the Federal League after the 2014–15 season. Beginning in the 2015–16 season, nine new schools began Suburban League play along with the remaining six schools, with Barberton, Hudson, and Twinsburg returning to the league, and Aurora, Brecksville–Broadview Heights, Cuyahoga Falls, Kent Roosevelt, North Royalton, and Stow–Munroe Falls joining the league. With the influx of new members, membership rose to 15 schools and was divided into two conferences based on enrollment, with the eight larger schools in the National Conference and the seven smaller schools in the American Conference. In 2019, the league announced that beginning in 2021, Cuyahoga Falls would move to the American Conference, in spite of Cuyahoga Falls having one of the largest enrollments in the league. The switch was requested by Cuyahoga Falls in hopes of being more competitive.

After several years of trying to add a 16th member, the league announced in September 2022 that Solon High School would be joining for the 2023–24 school year in all sports, pending approval from the Greater Cleveland Conference (GCC). GCC members approved Solon's departure for 2023–24 for all sports except football, citing difficulty in scheduling with seven teams. Solon began Suburban League competition as part of the National Conference in all sports except football in August 2023, with football joining in 2024.

Several membership changes were announced in late 2024 that are scheduled to take effect beginning with the 2026–27 school year. Cuyahoga Falls, Kent Roosevelt, and Tallmadge announced in October that they intend to leave the Suburban League and join the Metro Athletic Conference after the 2026–27 school year. This was later changed to the end of the 2025–26 school year. In turn, Kenston High School, Mayfield High School, and Medina High School announced plans in November to join the Suburban in 2026, with Kenston and Mayfield competing in the American Conference and Medina in the National Conference.
