= Greater Cleveland Conference =

Ohio high school sports conference

The Greater Cleveland Conference is an Ohio High School Athletic Association athletic league that is made up of members from Cuyahoga, Medina, Lake, and Lorain counties in the U.S. State of Ohio, established in 2015. An earlier Greater Cleveland Conference existed from 1950 to 1998.

== Members ==
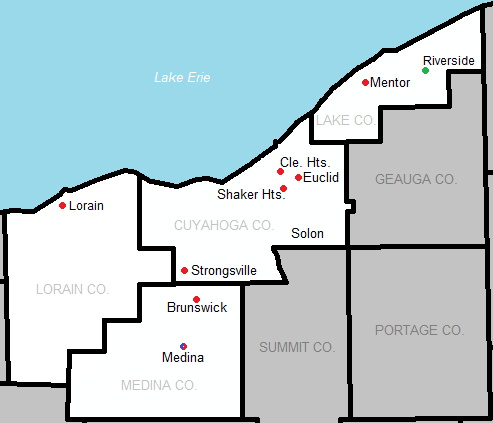
The current GCC members are shown in red. Future members are in green and departing members are blue/red.

School	Nickname	Location	Colors	Tenure	Notes
Brunswick	Blue Devils	Brunswick	Blue & white	2015–	
Cleveland Heights	Tigers	Cleveland Heights	Black & gold	2023–	
Euclid	Panthers	Euclid	Navy blue & gold	2015–	Member of original GCC, 1950–1962 and 1975–1998
Lorain	Titans	Lorain	Navy blue & silver	2025–	
Mentor	Cardinals	Mentor	Scarlet & gray	2015–	Member of original GCC, 1967–1993
Riverside	Beavers	Painesville	Black & Yellow	2026-	
Shaker Heights	Red Raiders	Shaker Heights	Red & white	2015–2020, 2023–	
Strongsville	Mustangs	Strongsville	Green & white	2015–	

== Former members ==
School	Nickname	Location	Colors	Tenure	Notes
Medina	Battling Bees	Medina	Green & white	2015–2026	Left for Suburban League

== Original GCC ==
School	Nickname	Location	Tenure	Notes
Bedford	Bearcats	Bedford	1950–1998	left for Lake Erie League
Berea	Braves	Berea	1950–1975	left for Lake Erie League
Brush	Arcs	Lyndhurst	1975–1998	left for Western Reserve Conference
Euclid	Panthers	Euclid	1950–1962; 1975–1998	left for Lake Erie League in 1962 and 1998
Garfield Heights	Bulldogs	Garfield Heights	1950–1968	left for Lake Erie League
Maple Heights	Mustangs	Maple Heights	1950–1998	left for Lake Erie League
Mayfield	Wildcats	Mayfield	1968–1998	left for Western Reserve Conference
Mentor	Cardinals	Mentor	1967–1993	left for Lake Erie League
Midpark	Meteors	Middleburg Heights	1962–1975	left for Lake Erie League
Nordonia	Knights	Macedonia	1994–1997	left for Western Reserve Conference
North	Rangers	Eastlake	1957–1998	left for Premier League
South	Rebels	Willoughby	1968–1998	left for Premier League
Union	Rangers	Willoughby	1950–1957	Split into North and South

== History ==
The first Greater Cleveland Conference was formed by six high schools in 1950, Bedford, Berea, Euclid, Garfield Heights, and Maple Heights and Willoughby Union. In 1957, Willoughby Union split into two separate schools: Eastlake North and Willoughby South. Eastlake North assumed the spot of Willoughby Union in the GCC, while Willoughby South joined a separate league. Midpark joined the GCC in 1962, while founding members Euclid and Garfield Heights departed for the Lake Erie League.

In 1968 the GCC expanded into eight teams, with the additions of Willoughby South, Mentor, and Mayfield. Berea and Midpark both respectively left the conference in favor of the Lake Erie League in 1975. Euclid rejoined along with Brush as their replacements. Mentor also joined its previous member schools in joining the Lake Erie League in 1993, meanwhile Nordonia joined the GCC the next year; they left in 1997 for the Western Reserve Conference. The following year, 1998, the first version of the GCC came to an end, as the remaining eight schools went on to join separate leagues, with Bedford, Euclid, and Maple Heights all joining the Lake Erie League, Nordonia, Brush, and Mayfield joining the Western Reserve Conference and North and South joining the Premier League.

The process to form a new Greater Cleveland Conference began in 2013. The new GCC officially began play in August 2015 with Brunswick, Elyria, Euclid, Medina, Mentor, Shaker Heights, Solon, and Strongsville.

Shaker Heights announced in 2019 their intention of rejoining the Lake Erie League effective the 2020-21 school year. citing better geography and travel times, but also diversity/cultural sensitivity issues" as reasons for leaving. Elyria accepted an invitation in 2020 to join the Southwestern Conference and left the following school year, leaving the newly formed GCC with six remaining members.

In 2022, Cleveland Heights and Shaker Heights were accepted into the GCC effective the 2023-24 school year, Later that year, Solon announced their intention of leaving for the Suburban League and joined in 2023 as a member school for football only. In 2024, Solon left for all remaining sports and became a full-time member of the league. Lorain was accepted into the conference in 2024 and began conference play during the 2025-26 school year. Riverside announced in 2025 their intention of joining the GCC beginning in the 2026-27 school year, with Medina being set to leave for the Suburban League the same year.
