= Strongsville High School =

Public, coeducational high school in Strongsville, Ohio, United States

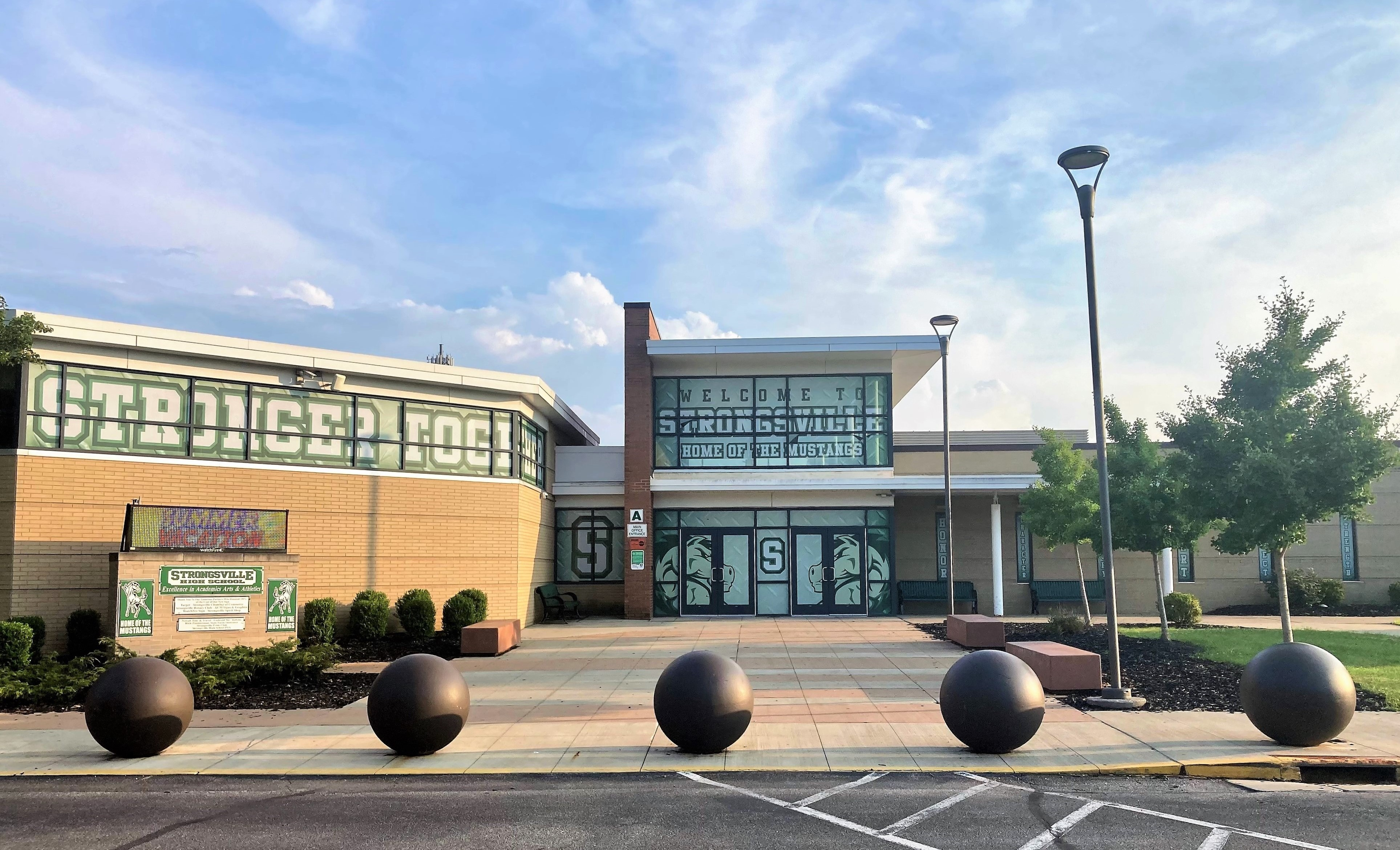
- Home of the Mustangs

Location
- 20025 Lunn Road; Strongsville, (Cuyahoga County), Ohio 44149; United States; 41°18′12″N 81°50′44″W

Information
- Type: Public, Coeducational high school
- Established: 1968
- School district: Strongsville City Schools
- Superintendent: Cameron M. Ryba
- Principal: Eric Smith
- Teaching staff: 97.90 (FTE)
- Grades: 9–12
- Student to teacher ratio: 18.99
- Education system: Strongsville City Schools
- Colors: Forest Green and White
- Slogan: Home of the Mustangs
- Song: Strongsville Alma Mater
- Fight song: Onwards Strongsville
- Athletics conference: Greater Cleveland Conference
- Mascot: Marty Mustang
- Team name: Mustangs
- Website: shs.scsmustangs.org

Strongsville High School is a public high school located in Strongsville, Ohio, United States. It is part of the Strongsville City School District, and the current principal is Eric Smith.

The school colors are forest green and white. The mascot is the Mustang. The school was a member of the Pioneer Conference but moved to the Northeast Ohio Conference at the conclusion of the 2006–07 school year. The fight song is to the tune of "On Wisconsin".

== Academic standards ==
Strongsville High is designated an Ohio School of Excellence with Distinction.

== Activities ==
=== UNICEF Club ===
The Strongsville High School UNICEF Club upholds the values of UNICEF through educating, advocating and fundraising.

=== Key Club ===
The Strongsville Key Club, chartered in 1999, is a member of the Kiwanis International service-leadership program for high school students: Key Club International.

=== The Marching Mustangs ===
Strongsville's marching band, the "Marching Mustangs," has participated in the Hollywood Christmas Parade, the Orange Bowl Parade, the Tournament of Roses Parade, the Macy's Thanksgiving Day Parade, and in the Inauguration Parade for President George H. W. Bush.

=== Language Clubs ===
- The German Club holds parties on German holidays, school-wide German trivia contests, and informs students about German culture and cultural traditions. It also supports the school's chapter of the German National Honor Society, Delta Epsilon Phi, or Deutsche Ehrenverbindung.
- The French club meets weekly, celebrates French holidays and informs students about French culture and cultural traditions.
- The Spanish club has weekly meetings and discuss the cultures of Spanish speaking countries.

== Athletics ==
=== Stadium ===
In late 2002 the school converted a rough field behind the school to a state-of-the-art 5,200 seat football stadium in just 84 days. The $1.85 million stadium was entirely privately financed. The name of the stadium is Pat Catan Stadium. The previous location of the high school football field was at Center Middle School (demolished in 2016) . The stadium was featured on national television when the Mustangs took on the Glenville Tarblooders in 2006. Returfed for games in 2016.

=== Championships ===
Ohio High School Athletic Association Division I State Championships:

- Baseball – 2006
- Boys Soccer – 1997
- Girls Soccer – 1998, 2002, 2005, 2011

=== State records ===
Tim Arthurs holds the Ohio High School Athletic Association Record for highest completion percentage among Ohio high school quarterbacks in a single season, with 72.5% in 1998.

== Arson ==
In the early morning of January 29, 1996, a fire was started in the offices at the center of the school. Police identified the propellant as gasoline and believe those responsible targeted the paper records held in the administrative offices. The investigation noted a window in a classroom that was either left open or unlocked. The investigation remains unsolved despite a $10,000 reward and hundreds of tips after the fire. Damage to the building totaled $1.4 million.

== Allegations of negligence ==
In February 2006 a former Strongsville High student sued the school district and the police department claiming that they did nothing to stop an affair he had with a female teacher, Christine Scarlett, while he was a student at the school.

Christine Scarlett was a substitute special education teacher hired by Strongsville High School. In 2002 Scarlett began a program to encourage her students to improve their grades called “raise your grade – date a teacher”. In November of that year Scarlett announced the winner of the contest was a male student with learning disabilities on the football team. A 2 year sexual relationship resulting in the birth of a child began between Scarlett then 36, and the student aged 17.

In January 2006, the student now 20 years old, sued Scarlett for custody of their 3-year-old son exposing the relationship to public scrutiny.

In May 2007 Christine Scarlett pleaded guilty to sexual assault and battery in Cuyahoga County Common Pleas Court. She received a sentence of three days in county jail, followed by 180 days’ house arrest and five years’ probation.

In 2023 it was discovered that a student had engaged in sexual activity during the schools annual bus trip to Washington DC. The student had previous incidents including a similar incident in middle school where the students engaged in their health class The student was promptly reported and arrested after arrival.

The lawsuit filed by the former student against Strongsville City Schools claimed the school system enabled Scarlett to conduct the “raise your grade – date a teacher” curriculum which resulted in the assault and sexual battery against the “handicapped child”. The Ohio 8th District Court of Appeals determined that the action against the school system for failing to protect the child was outside of the statute of limitations.

In January 2008, Strongsville Police accused school officials of hindering a criminal investigation by failing to promptly report allegations that another teacher had a sexual relationship with a student. After receiving an anonymous tip in November 2007, school officials investigated and determined the allegations not credible.

April 29, 2008 a Cuyahoga County grand jury charged 32-year-old social studies teacher John Bacho with five counts of sexual battery and possession of a criminal tool.

John Bacho was found guilty of two counts of sexual battery on July 16, 2009. He was sentenced to three years in prison.

== Teachers union strike ==
On March 4, 2013 members of the Strongsville Education Associate (SEA) picketed outside the building after contract negotiations failed regarding healthcare costs and salaries had not been increased for 7 years. The Strongsville City Schools 2013 Teacher Strike lasted for eight weeks concluding with agreed upon contracts April 27, 2013.

== Notable alumni ==
- Jim Goetz, venture capitalist
- Mark Hunter, musician, photographer
- Andrea R. Lucas, acting chair of the Equal Employment Opportunity Commission
- Marwan Maalouf, coach in the National Football League
- Shawn Mennenga, coach in the National Football League
- Blake Miller, college football offensive tackle for the Detroit Lions
- Tucker Neale, basketball player
- John G. Peters, president, Northern Illinois University
- Matt Warburton, screenwriter for The Simpsons, Community, and The Mindy Project
- Aaron White, professional basketball player
- D. J. Woods, professional football player
