= Twinsburg High School =

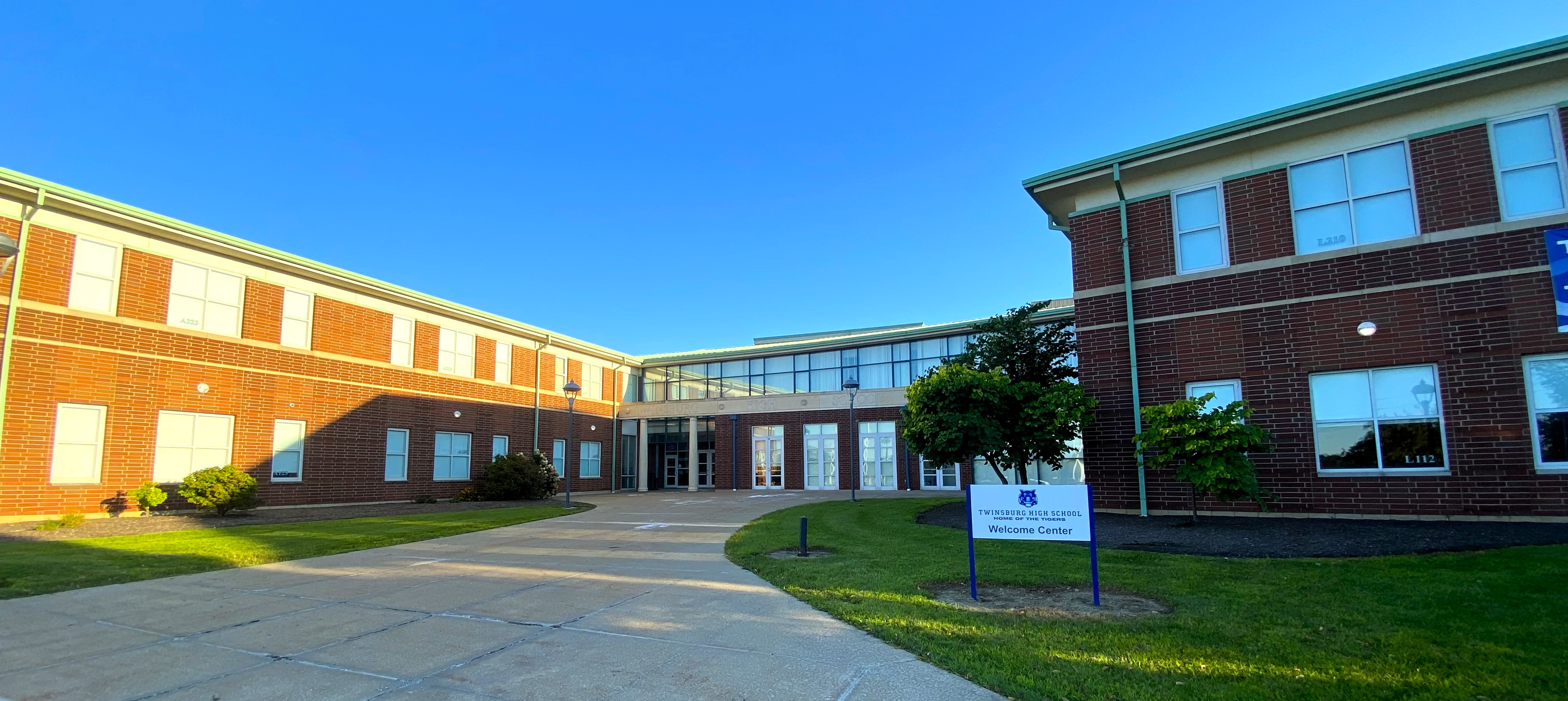

Location
- 10084 Ravenna Road; Twinsburg, Ohio 44087; United States; 41°19′4″N 81°27′1″W

Information
- Established: 1885
- School district: Twinsburg City School District
- Principal: Emily Hunt
- Teaching staff: 72.00 (FTE)
- Enrollment: 1,226 (2023-2024)
- Student to teacher ratio: 17.03
- Colors: Blue and White
- Athletics conference: Suburban League
- Team name: Tigers
- Website: www.twinsburg.k12.oh.us/ths_home.aspx

Twinsburg High School is a public high school in Twinsburg, Ohio, United States. It is the only high school in the Twinsburg City School District. Athletic teams are known as the Tigers and compete in the Suburban League as a member of the Ohio High School Athletic Association.

== History ==
Opened in 1885, Twinsburg High School serves students grades 9-12

The current Twinsburg High School building, built to relieve overcrowding, was completed in January 1999 for $36 million.

Construction of the school and attached city fitness center took three years. During those three years, the school board and community decided that there should be an additional pod on the building since the population was growing so quickly. This pod would be a shell and not finished inside until needed. The unfinished L-pod was built during the spring and summer of 2006. It was open to the staff and student body for the 2006–2007 school year. Twinsburg High School also offers vocational education training at Cuyahoga Valley Career Center.

== Athletics ==
Twinsburg High School currently offers:

- Baseball
- Basketball
- Bowling
- Cheerleading
- Cross County
- Golf
- Gymnastics
- Football
- Soccer
- Softball
- Swimming and Diving
- Tennis
- Track and field
- Volleyball
- Wrestling

=== State championships ===
- Girls Basketball - 2011, 2012

== Notable alumni ==
- James Posey - former professional basketball player and coach in the National Basketball Association (NBA)
- Scott Effross - professional baseball pitcher for the Major League Baseball (MLB)
- Zoltán Meskó - former professional football player in the National Football League (NFL)
- Brad Stuver - professional soccer player in Major League Soccer (MLS)
