= North Royalton High School =

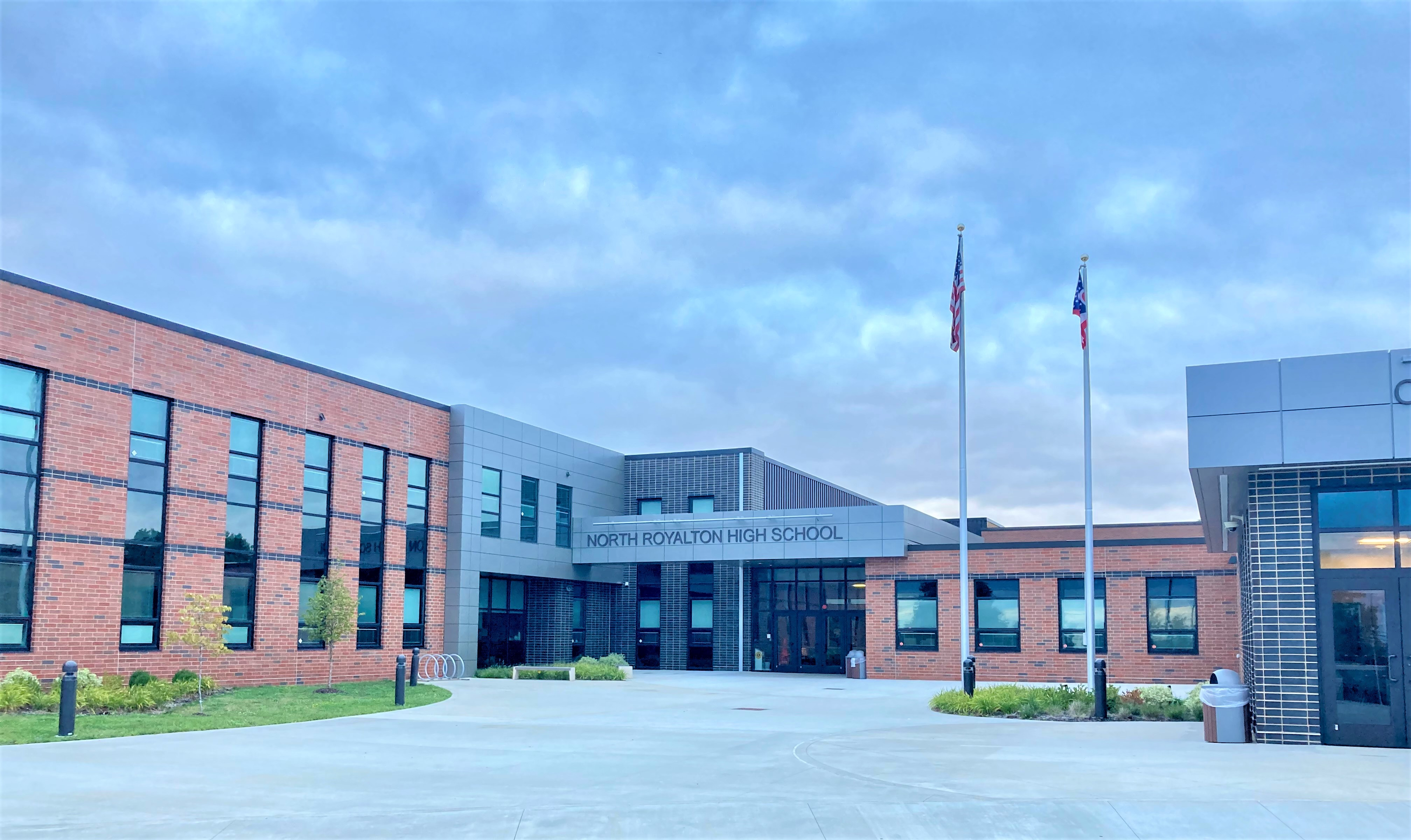

Location
- 14713 Ridge Road; North Royalton, Ohio 44133; United States; 41°18′33″N 81°44′00″W

Information
- Type: Public
- Motto: To Inspire and Empower Learners.
- Established: 1907
- Superintendent: Jeff Cicerchi
- Principal: Kristin Hubbell
- Staff: 64.80 (FTE)
- Grades: 9–12
- Enrollment: 1,397 (2023–2024)
- Student to teacher ratio: 21.56
- Colors: Purple and gold
- Athletics conference: Suburban League; National Division
- Team name: Bears
- Rival: Brecksville–Broadview Heights High School
- Website: www.northroyaltonsd.org/o/nrhs

North Royalton High School is a public high school located in North Royalton, Ohio, United States, a suburban community in Greater Cleveland. Over 1,000 students attend the school. North Royalton is a member of the National Division of the Suburban League. The school colors are purple and gold and athletic teams are known as the Bears. The school's principal is Kristin Hubbell since 2024.The school's superintendent is Jeff Cicerchi.

== Student achievements ==
North Royalton High School has received various awards for excellence in education. In 2026 North Royalton received the U.S. News Best High School Award Badge. North Royalton is ranked sixty-second in Ohio, and twentieth in the Cleveland Metro Area High Schools by U.S. News.

== Athletics ==
=== State Championships ===
- Boys Soccer – 1979

The 1979 North Royalton Bears state champion soccer team is the 1st boys’ soccer team in the history of Ohio to finish the season undefeated at 21-0-0.

== Band ==
The North Royalton High School Band Program is the largest student organization on campus with over 200 members. The band program incorporates a competitive corps-style marching band, as well four concert bands: Freshman Band, Concert Band, Symphonic Band, and Wind Ensemble. It also has two jazz bands. The marching band has appeared at every Ohio Music Education Association (OMEA) State Marching Band Finals since 1986, receiving a "Superior" (I) rating in all but two years and in 34 consecutive appearances since 1990. They have performed at Walt Disney World, Disneyland, The Tournament of Roses Parade in Pasadena, California, The Indianapolis 500 Parade, the BCS Championship in New Orleans, and many more destinations around the country. David Vitale has been the director of bands since 2010.

== Vocal music ==
The North Royalton High School vocal music department has had at least one choir since its founding. The oldest performing group is the Concert Choir made up of SATB singers from different grade-levels. In the 1980s, North Royalton expanded to include "Royal Harmony", a competing SATB show choir. In addition to choirs, the vocal music department helps to produce an annual musical each spring. There are currently five choirs: Freshman Choir, Concert Choir, Royaltones (co-ed a cappella), Royal Harmony (co-ed competitive show choir), and the Bearitones (male a cappella).

== The Dan Calabrese Center for the Performing Arts ==
North Royalton High School's performing arts center, The Dan Calabrese Center for the Performing Arts ("The PAC"), was built when a new wing was added to the school in 1989 and has hosted a number of shows and events since. It has played host to the musicals such as Guys and Dolls, Annie, The Pajama Game, Big Fish, The Music Man, Grease, How to Succeed in Business..., Footloose, Little Shop of Horrors, Shrek, Anything Goes and West Side Story.

The PAC has also been the home of many events such as the Royalton Rock-Off, which was a benefit concert showcasing a number of student-formed rock bands. Additionally, the annual talent featured such acts as The Villagers, a singing group founded in 1996 that featured a revolving cast of new performers in successive years through 2010.

== Notable alumni ==
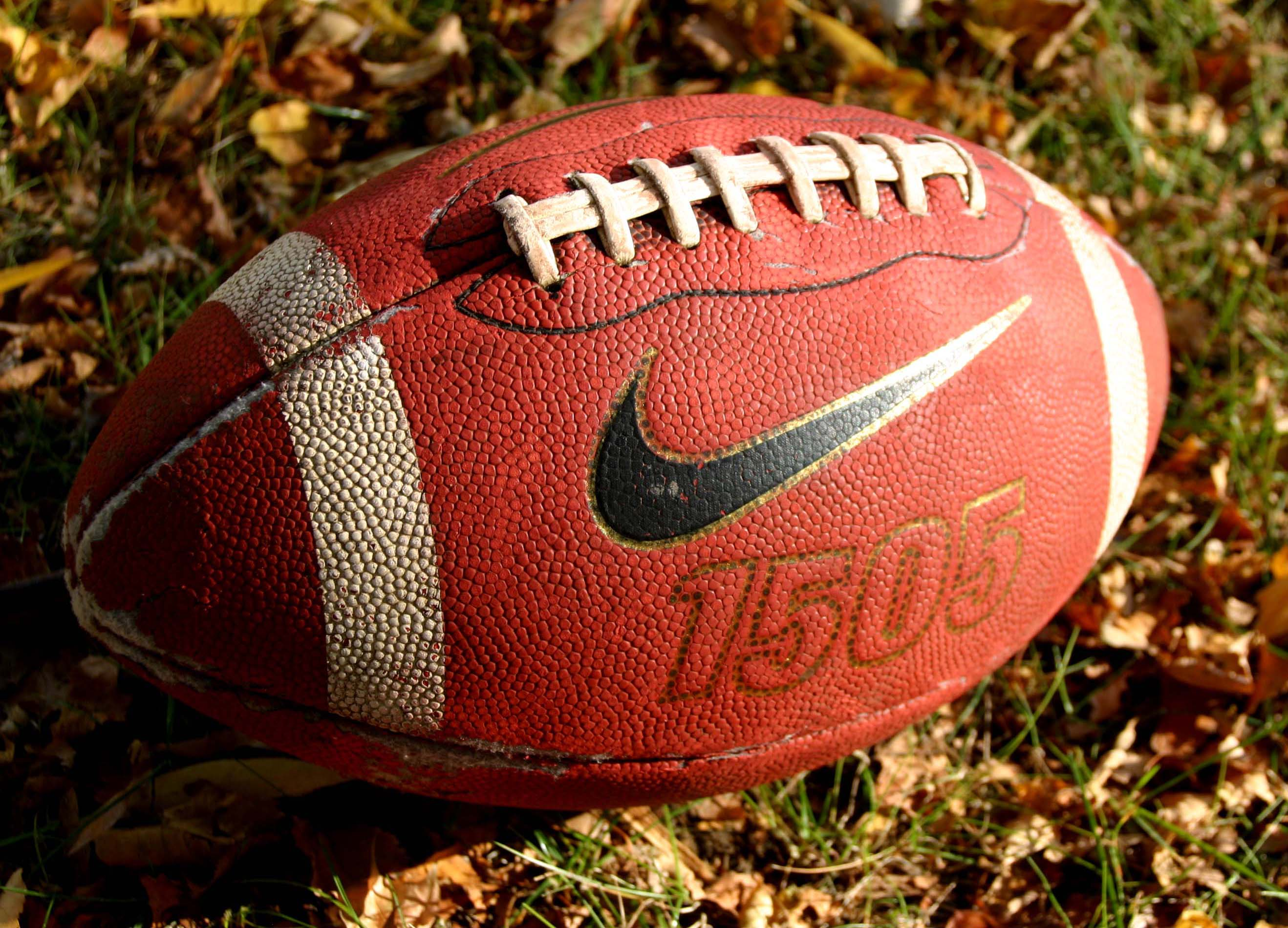
A modern American football

- Dan France- Professional football player in the National Football League (NFL)
- Nicole Marie Lenz- Actress, Playboy model
- Omari Spellman - Professional basketball player in the National Basketball Association (NBA); attended NRHS for 9th and 10th grade
- George White - Professional football player in the Canadian Football League (CFL)
- Greg Schultz - the campaign manager for Joe Biden's 2020 presidential campaign in the United States.
- Ryan Nowlin - Director of the United States Marine Band [2023–present]
