= North Royalton, Ohio =

- City
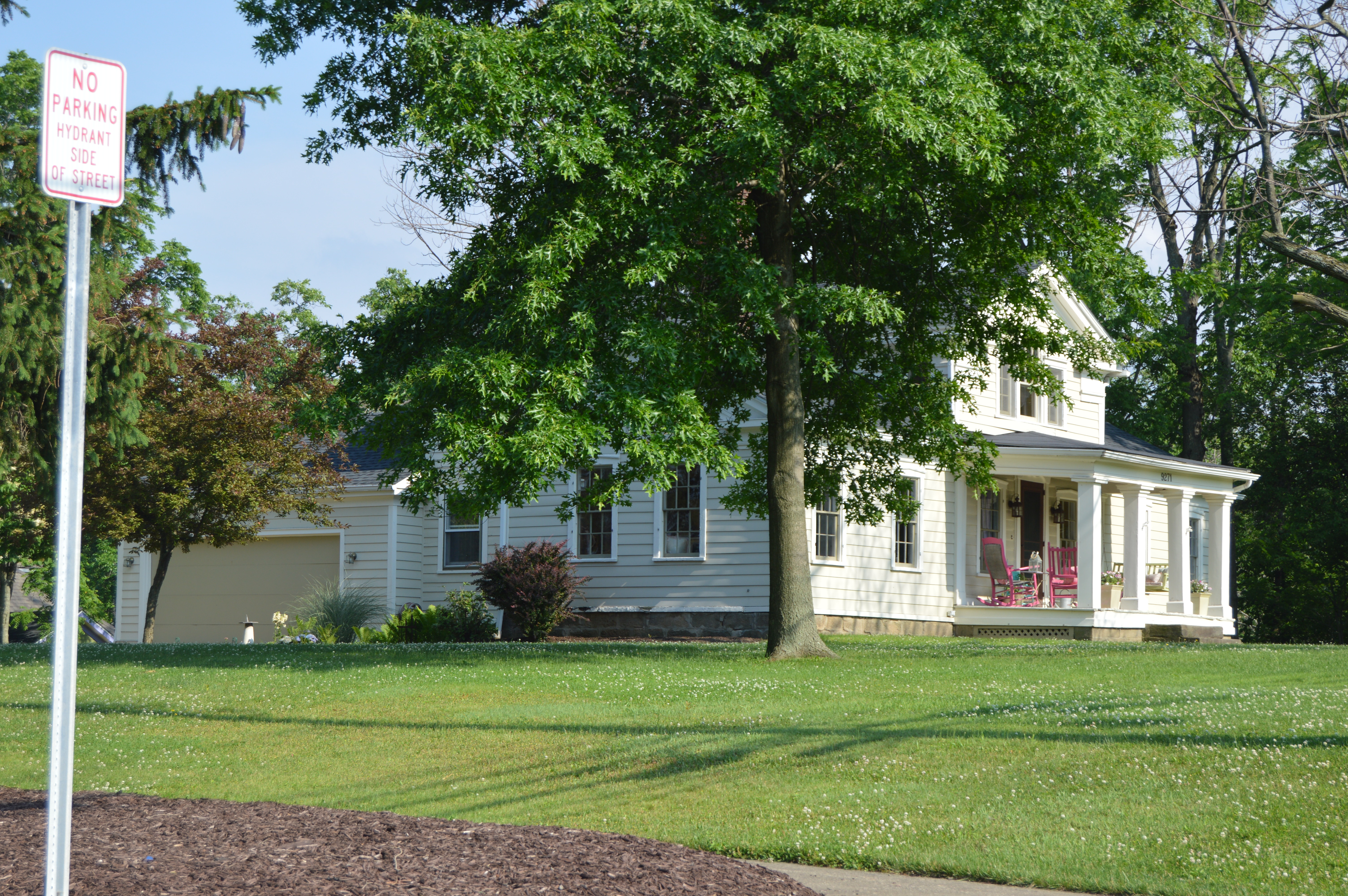
- The John M. Annis House on State Road, built 1833

- Flag Seal
- Interactive map of North Royalton, Ohio
- Location within Ohio Location within the United States
- Coordinates: 41°19′20″N 81°44′47″W
- Country: United States
- State: Ohio
- County: Cuyahoga

Government
  - Mayor: Paul F. Marnecheck

Area
  - Total: 21.42 sq mi (55.47 km^{2})
  - Land: 21.40 sq mi (55.42 km^{2})
  - Water: 0.019 sq mi (0.05 km^{2})
- Elevation: 1,198 ft (365 m)

Population (2020)
  - Total: 31,322
  - Density: 1,464/sq mi (565.2/km^{2})
- Time zone: UTC-5 (Eastern (EST))
  - Summer (DST): UTC-4 (EDT)
- ZIP code: 44133
- FIPS code: 39-57008
- GNIS feature ID: 1065175
- Website: https://northroyalton.gov/

North Royalton is a city in Cuyahoga County, Ohio, United States. It is a suburb of Cleveland. The population was 31,322 as of the 2020 census. Originally incorporated as a village in 1927, it achieved the status of city in 1961.

== History ==
North Royalton was founded in 1818. Knight Sprague, an early settler, had the township named after his native town in Vermont, Royalton. Sometime between 1880 and 1890, the name of Royalton was changed to North Royalton because of another town in Ohio bearing the same name. On April 4, 1927, the township officially became the Village of North Royalton, and the first mayor, E. C. McCombs, was elected.

== Geography ==
North Royalton is located at 41°19′20″N 81°44′47″W.

According to the United States Census Bureau, the city has a total area of 21.32 square miles (55.22 km^{2}), of which 21.31 square miles (55.19 km^{2}) is land and 0.01 square miles (0.03 km^{2}) is water.

== Demographics ==
Historical population
Census	Pop.	Note	%±
1920	1,262		—
1930	1,897		50.3%
1940	2,559		34.9%
1950	3,939		53.9%
1960	9,290		135.8%
1970	12,807		37.9%
1980	17,705		38.2%
1990	23,197		31.0%
2000	28,648		23.5%
2010	30,444		6.3%
2020	31,322		2.9%

=== Racial and ethnic composition ===
North Royalton city, Ohio – Racial and ethnic composition Note: the US Census treats Hispanic/Latino as an ethnic category. This table excludes Latinos from the racial categories and assigns them to a separate category. Hispanics/Latinos may be of any race.
Race / Ethnicity (NH = Non-Hispanic)	Pop 2000	Pop 2010	Pop 2020	% 2000	% 2010	% 2020
White alone (NH)	27,356	28,449	27,552	95.49%	93.45%	87.96%
Black or African American alone (NH)	200	340	544	0.70%	1.12%	1.74%
Native American or Alaska Native alone (NH)	33	16	31	0.12%	0.05%	0.10%
Asian alone (NH)	570	837	1,332	1.99%	2.75%	4.25%
Native Hawaiian or Pacific Islander alone (NH)	6	6	0	0.02%	0.02%	0.00%
Other race alone (NH)	12	21	67	0.04%	0.07%	0.21%
Mixed race or Multiracial (NH)	198	302	947	0.69%	0.99%	3.02%
Hispanic or Latino (any race)	273	473	849	0.95%	1.55%	2.71%
Total	28,648	30,444	31,322	100.00%	100.00%	100.00%

=== 2020 census ===
As of the 2020 census, North Royalton had a population of 31,322. The median age was 45.0 years. 18.3% of residents were under the age of 18 and 21.2% of residents were 65 years of age or older. For every 100 females there were 97.5 males, and for every 100 females age 18 and over there were 95.0 males age 18 and over.

96.2% of residents lived in urban areas, while 3.8% lived in rural areas.

There were 13,505 households in North Royalton, of which 23.8% had children under the age of 18 living in them. Of all households, 50.8% were married-couple households, 18.1% were households with a male householder and no spouse or partner present, and 25.2% were households with a female householder and no spouse or partner present. About 31.3% of all households were made up of individuals and 13.1% had someone living alone who was 65 years of age or older.

There were 14,125 housing units, of which 4.4% were vacant. The homeowner vacancy rate was 1.0% and the rental vacancy rate was 6.7%.

Racial composition as of the 2020 census
Race	Number	Percent
White	27,813	88.8%
Black or African American	567	1.8%
American Indian and Alaska Native	37	0.1%
Asian	1,337	4.3%
Native Hawaiian and Other Pacific Islander	0	0.0%
Some other race	245	0.8%
Two or more races	1,323	4.2%
Hispanic or Latino (of any race)	849	2.7%

=== 2010 census ===
As of the census of 2010, there were 30,444 people, 12,944 households, and 8,220 families residing in the city. The population density was 1,428.6 inhabitants per square mile (551.6/km^{2}). There were 13,710 housing units at an average density of 643.4 per square mile (248.4/km^{2}). The racial makeup of the city was 94.6% White, 1.2% African American, 0.1% Native American, 2.8% Asian, 0.3% from other races, and 1.1% from two or more races. Hispanic or Latino of any race were 1.6% of the population.

There were 12,944 households, of which 26.5% had children under the age of 18 living with them, 52.5% were married couples living together, 7.9% had a female householder with no husband present, 3.1% had a male householder with no wife present, and 36.5% were non-families. 31.0% of all households were made up of individuals, and 10.1% had someone living alone who was 65 years of age or older. The average household size was 2.33 and the average family size was 2.97.

The median age in the city was 43.5 years. 20.1% of residents were under the age of 18; 7.7% were between the ages of 18 and 24; 24.3% were from 25 to 44; 32.7% were from 45 to 64; and 15.1% were 65 years of age or older. The gender makeup of the city was 48.8% male and 51.2% female.

=== 2000 census ===
As of the census of 2000, there were 28,647 people, 11,250 households, and 7,695 families residing in the city. The population density was 1,345.9 inhabitants per square mile (519.7/km^{2}). There were 11,754 housing units at an average density of 552.2 per square mile (213.2/km^{2}). The racial makeup of the city was 96.18% White, 0.71% African American, 0.12% Native American, 1.99% Asian, 0.02% Pacific Islander, 0.16% from other races, and 0.83% from two or more races. Hispanic or Latino of any race were 0.95% of the population.

There were 11,250 households, out of which 31.5% had children under the age of 18 living with them, 58.4% were married couples living together, 7.4% had a female householder with no husband present, and 31.6% were non-families. 26.7% of all households were made up of individuals, and 7.0% had someone living alone who was 65 years of age or older. The average household size was 2.51 and the average family size was 3.11. The average house cost about $210,000.00.

In the city the population was spread out, with 24.3% under the age of 18, 7.7% from 18 to 24, 30.6% from 25 to 44, 25.4% from 45 to 64, and 12.0% who were 65 years of age or older. The median age was 39 years. For every 100 females, there were 95.2 males. For every 100 females age 18 and over, there were 92.4 males.

The median income for a household in the city was $57,398, and the median income for a family was $69,983. Males had a median income of $46,764.00 versus $31,173.00 for females. The per capita income for the city was $26,610. About 1.2% of families and 2.3% of the population were below the poverty line, including 1.5% of those under age 18 and 3.5% of those age 65 or over.

Of the city's population over the age of 25, 32.9% hold a bachelor's degree or higher.

=== Languages ===
96.3% spoke English, 1.5% German, 1.3% Polish, and 0.9% Italian in their house.

== Schools ==
The North Royalton School District serves approximately 4700 students in the communities of North Royalton and Broadview Hts.

- North Royalton Elementary School (Grades K–4)
- North Royalton Middle School (Grades 5–8)
- North Royalton High School (Grades 9–12)

Parochial schools

- St. Albert the Great School (K-8)
- Royal Redeemer Lutheran School (K-8)

The High School recently added a new 60,000 foot math and science wing.

== Library ==
North Royalton's public library is a branch of the Cuyahoga County Public Library (CCPL), the busiest per-capita system in the country. A new building to which all functions have been transferred opened in August 2013, is located two miles north of the city center at 5071 Wallings Road, North Royalton, Ohio. It was formerly located at 14600 State Road (OH-94) with North Royalton's Memorial Park almost adjacent to Route 82. The existing library structure was then converted into a new city hall facility, which opened to the public in 2015.

== Notable people ==
- Chris Broussard – Former resident, ESPN NBA analyst
- Erich Gliebe - Former boxer and chairman of National Alliance.

== Surrounding communities ==
North Royalton is bordered by Parma to the north, Broadview Heights to the east, Hinckley to the south, and Strongsville to the west.
