= Lake Erie League =

Defunct high school athletic conference in Ohio U.S.

The Lake Erie League (LEL) was an Ohio High School Athletic Association (OHSAA) sports conference that mainly includes schools in the greater Cleveland, Ohio area. In 2025, after Lorain opted to join the Greater Cleveland Conference for the 2025–2026 school year, the remaining five members: Bedford, Garfield Heights, Maple Heights, Shaw, and Warrensville Heights made the tough decision to disband due to a decline in membership

== All-time members ==
School	Nickname	Location	Colors	Tenure	Notes
Admiral King	Admirals	Lorain	?	2002–2010	consolidated into Lorain
Bedford	Bearcats	Bedford	Green & white	1998–2025	one of the final members in 2025
Brush	Arcs	Lyndhurst	Brown and gold	1962–1975	to Greater Cleveland
Berea	Braves	Berea	Scarlet and blue	1975–1978	to Pioneer
Cleveland Heights	Tigers	Cleveland	Black and gold	1918–1975	to Greater Cleveland
Elyria	Pioneers	Elyria	Red, white, and black	1928–1953; 1997–2003	to Buckeye Conference in 1953, to Pioneer in 2003
Euclid	Panthers	Euclid	Navy blue and gold	1951–1975; 1998–2015	to Greater Cleveland
Garfield Heights	Bulldogs	Garfield Heights	Blue & gold	1968–1986; 1993–2025	football 1968–86, 1993–2007, to Northeast Ohio in 2007, one of the final members in 2025
Lakewood	Rangers	Lakewood	Purple and gold	1918–2006	to Northeast Ohio
Lorain	Titans	Lorain	Navy blue & silver	2010–2025	one of the final members in 2025
Lorain	Steelman	Lorain	?	1928–1953	to Buckeye Conference
Lutheran East	Falcons	Cleveland Heights	Blue and white	2017–2019	
Maple Heights	Mustangs	Maple Heights	Maroon & white	1998–2025	one of the final members in 2025
Mentor	Cardinals	Mentor	Scarlet and gray	1993–2011	to Northeast Ohio
Midpark	Meteors	Middleburg Heights	Brown and orange	1975–1978	to Pioneer
Normandy	Invaders	Parma	Orange, white and black	1968–2003	to Pioneer
Parma	Redman	Parma	Red and gray	1955–2003	to Pioneer
Rocky River	Pirates	Rocky River	Maroon & white	1920–1932	to Southwestern
Shaw	Cardinals	East Cleveland	Red & black	1918–2025	one of the final members in 2025
Shaker Heights	Red Raiders	Shaker Heights	Red and white	1936–2012; 2020–2023	to Greater Cleveland
Southview	Saints	Lorain	?	2002–2010	consolidated into Lorain
University School	Preppers	Hunting Valley	Maroon and black	1918–1920	
Valley Forge	Patriots	Parma Heights	Navy blue and white	1962–2004	to Pioneer
Warrensville Heights	Tigers	Warrensville Heights	Blue & gold	1993–2025	Football 1993–2014, 2016–2025, one of the final members in 2025
Warren G. Harding	Raiders	Warren	Black and gold	2010–2013	to All-American, football through 2014 season

== History ==
The Lake Erie League (LEL) originated in 1918 with the formation of the “Quad League,” consisting of Shaw High School, Lakewood High School, Cleveland Heights High School, and University School. In 1920, University School withdrew and was replaced by Rocky River High School, maintaining a four-school alignment.

The league expanded in 1928 with the addition of Lorain High School and Elyria High School, at which point the conference adopted the name “Lake Erie League.” After Rocky River’s departure in 1932, the league returned to five members before growing again in 1936 with the addition of Shaker Heights High School.

From 1936 through the early 1950s, the LEL maintained a stable six-school membership of Shaw, Lakewood, Cleveland Heights, Lorain, Elyria, and Shaker Heights, establishing itself as one of the premier high school athletic conferences in northeastern Ohio. This period of stability ended in 1951 when Euclid High School joined, followed by the departures of Lorain and Elyria in 1953. Parma High School was admitted in 1955, and further expansion occurred in 1962 with the additions of Brush High School and Valley Forge High School.

The league reached ten members in 1968–69 with the inclusion of Garfield Heights High School and Normandy High School. However, significant realignment occurred in 1973, when multiple schools announced their departure effective with the 1975–76 school year. Euclid and Brush left to join the Eastern Greater Cleveland Conference, while Normandy, Parma, and Valley Forge aligned with schools in the Berea and Midpark districts.

In response, a restructured “new” Lake Erie League was formed for the 1975–76 season, consisting of Lakewood High School, Garfield Heights High School, and several Berea-area schools alongside Cleveland Heights, Shaker Heights, and Shaw. This reorganization marked a major turning point in league history, effectively resetting its membership base.

Subsequent decades were characterized by periodic contraction and expansion. Berea and Midpark withdrew following the 1978–79 season, and Garfield Heights departed in 1986–87. The league expanded again in 1993–94 to ten members with the addition of Garfield Heights, Mentor High School, and Warrensville Heights High School. Further growth followed with the additions of Elyria in 1997 and Bedford High School, Maple Heights High School, and Euclid in 1998.

The LEL reached its largest size in 2002–03 when Admiral King High School and Southview High School joined, bringing membership to sixteen schools. This peak was short-lived, as Elyria, Normandy, Parma, and Valley Forge departed in 2004, followed by Lakewood and Garfield Heights in 2006–07.

In the 2010s, the league experienced continued turnover. Southview and Admiral King merged in 2010 to form Lorain High School, while Warren G. Harding High School joined the same year before departing in 2014. Mentor left in 2011, Shaker Heights in 2012, and Euclid in 2015.

Late-decade changes included the addition of Lutheran East High School in 2017 and its departure in 2019, alongside the return of Garfield Heights that same year. Shaker Heights rejoined the league in 2020, bringing membership to eight school however, they would leave just 3 years later in 2023, along with former LEL member Cleveland Heights, both joining the Greater Cleveland Conference.

Lorain opted to join the Greater Cleveland Conference for the 2025-2026 school year, the remaining five members Bedford, Garfield Heights, Maple Heights, Shaw, and Warrensville Heights made the tough decision to disband due to a decline in membership The remaining 5 later formed a new athletic league that didn't include Shaw in 2026, called the United Athletic Conference.

== See also ==
- Ohio High School Athletic Conferences
