= Frank Mestnik =

American football player (born 1938)

No. 36, 35, 48
- Position: Fullback

Personal information
- Born: February 23, 1938; Cleveland, Ohio, U.S.
- Died: January 24, 2023 (aged 84); Alpharetta, Georgia, U.S.
- Listed height: 6 ft 2 in (1.88 m)
- Listed weight: 200 lb (91 kg)

Career information
- High school: Maple Heights (Ohio)
- College: Marquette (1956–1959)
- NFL draft: 1960: 15th round, 170th overall pick
- AFL draft: 1960

Career history
- St. Louis Cardinals (1960–1962); New York Giants (1962)*; Green Bay Packers (1963–1964); Minnesota Vikings (1965)*; Newark Bears (1965); Chicago Bears (1966)*
- * Offseason or practice squad member only

Career NFL statistics
- Rushing yards: 767
- Rushing average: 3.8
- Receptions: 15
- Receiving yards: 53
- Total touchdowns: 5
- Stats at Pro Football Reference

Frank Gerald Mestnik (February 23, 1938 – January 24, 2023) was an American professional football player who was a fullback in the National Football League (NFL) for the St. Louis Cardinals and the Green Bay Packers. He played college football at Marquette University in Milwaukee, Wisconsin. After graduation, he was selected by the Cardinals in the 15th round (170th overall) of the 1960 NFL draft. He also had stints in the NFL with the New York Giants, Minnesota Vikings and Chicago Bears, but saw no playing time with them. Mestnik additionally spent a year with the Newark Bears of the Continental Football League (COFL).

== Early life ==
Mestnik was born on February 23, 1938, in Cleveland, Ohio. He attended Maple Heights High School in Maple Heights, Ohio, and was the first of two of their alumni (along with Richard Quinn) to play in the NFL. He was a multi-sport athlete and received a full athletic scholarship to play football at Marquette University in Milwaukee, Wisconsin.

== College career ==
Mestnik began attending Marquette University in 1956 but did not play for their football team until his sophomore year in 1957. He quickly became a starter at fullback and was one of the top players for the team that went 0–10 and ranked 110th out of 112th major colleges. Mestnik also played defense, with the Arizona Daily Star noting that he was "rated the top offensive and defense star" for Marquette. He finished the 1957 season as the team's leading rusher with 81 carries for 328 yards (a 4.0 average); he also attempted one pass, which was caught for a loss of one yard.

Marquette compiled a record of 2–7–1 in 1958, with Mestnik leading their other running backs by over 300 yards rushing; he compiled 480 rushing yards and one touchdown on 130 attempts while also having one reception for seven yards. His 130 rushes placed fifth among major independent schools and set a new school record, breaking the previous record of 128 by Johnny Strzykalski. For his performance, he was selected Marquette's most valuable player and was given the Alpha Kappa Memorial Trophy.

Mestnik was second to Jim Webster in rushing for Marquette in 1959, as the team finished with a record of 3–7. He totaled 97 rush attempts for 339 yards (a 3.5 average) and six touchdowns while also catching eight passes for 78 yards. He ranked fifth among major independents for rushing touchdowns and ninth in touchdowns overall. Mestnik finished his collegiate career with 308 rushes for 1,147 yards (a 3.7 average) and seven touchdowns along with nine catches for 85 yards. He played in the Chicago College All-Star Game in 1960 against the NFL champion Baltimore Colts, a 32–7 win for the Colts.

== Professional career ==
Mestnik was among the first selections in the 1960 AFL draft by the Boston Patriots and was also chosen in the 15th round (170th overall) of the 1960 NFL draft by the St. Louis Cardinals. He ultimately signed to play with the Cardinals. He scored two touchdowns with St. Louis in a preseason game against the Baltimore Colts. He made the Cardinals' roster and appeared in nine games, four to five as a starter, (Note: Pro-Football-Reference.com and Pro Football Archives conflict.) as a rookie. He was their second-leading rusher and fifth-leading point scorer with 104 carries for 429 yards (a 4.1 average) and three touchdowns. He also caught three passes for 24 yards and returned three kickoffs for 39 yards as St. Louis went 6–5–1. In 1961, Mestnik was the second back behind Prentice Gautt, starting five to seven games while appearing in a total of 13, (Note: Sources conflict.) as the Cardinals went 7–7. He recorded 95 rushes for 334 yards (a 3.5 average) and scored a touchdown while also catching 12 passes for 29 yards and another touchdown; Mestnik had two kickoff returns for 27 yards as well. He was third in rushing for the Cardinals in the 1962 preseason but was released during roster cuts.

After being released by the Cardinals, Mestnik spent time with the taxi squad of the New York Giants in the 1962 season. While out of football in the 1963 offseason, Mestnik worked as a sales engineer trainee at Reliance Electric and co-managed a driving range with his uncle Hank, a former minor league baseball player, and Joe Sedely, a boxer. He then signed with the Green Bay Packers for the 1963 season but was released at the start of September during roster cuts. He later returned to Green Bay the following month. He appeared in 11 games for the Packers in the 1963 season and ran the ball once for four yards, additionally returning one kickoff for no gain. He was released at the final roster cuts in 1964.

Mestnik signed with the Minnesota Vikings for the 1965 season; however, he was injured and released when he refused to sign a waiver of liability form. He then spent the year with the Newark Bears of the minor Continental Football League (COFL), rushing 10 times for 45 yards (a 4.5 average) with one catch for 10 yards as the Bears went 5–9. He had a final comeback attempt with the Chicago Bears in 1966, but was unable to make the final roster. He ended his NFL career with 200 rush attempts for 767 yards (a 3.8 average) and four touchdowns, 15 receptions for 53 yards and one touchdown, and six kickoff returns for 66 yards in 33 games.

== Later life ==
Mestnik later lived in Alpharetta, Georgia. He worked for Reliance Electric and Franklin Electric. He also served as the vice chairman of Air Fry Inc., senior vice president of the Arthur Consulting Group, vice president of Lincoln Southeast and vice president of Arthur D. Little Valuation Inc. He was a parishioner at St. Benedict Catholic Church, treasurer of the Atlanta chapter of the NFL Players Association and also was president of the Atlanta NFL Alumni Association in his retirement. He was married and had four daughters. He died on January 24, 2023, at the age of 84.
