= United Athletic Conference (OHSAA) =

High school athletic conference in Ohio

The United Athletic Conference is an Ohio High School Athletic Association athletic conference that will begin conference play in the 2026–27 school year and is made up of member schools from Cuyahoga and Mahoning counties in Ohio.

== Members ==
| School | Nickname | Location | Colors | Tenure |
|---|---|---|---|---|
| Bedford | Bearcats | Bedford | Green & white | 2026– |
| Brush | Arcs | Lynhurst | Brown and gold | 2026– |
| Garfield Heights | Bulldogs | Garfield Heights | Blue & gold | 2026– |
| Maple Heights | Mustangs | Maple Heights | Maroon & white | 2026– |
| Warrensville Heights | Tigers | Warrensville Heights | Blue & gold | 2026– |
| Youngstown | Defenders | Youngstown | Red, yellow & blue | 2026– |

== History ==
The United Athletic Conference formed in 2025, with several members in Cuyahoga County and one member in Mahoning County. The league was formed following the collapse of the former Lake Erie League and its remaining members creating a new league. The league was created to help cut costs in travel and increase profits from gate costs, as well as enrollment-based competitive balance. The founding members include Bedford, Garfield Heights, Maple Heights, Warrensville Heights, Brush and Youngstown. All members aside from Youngstown will be full-time members, Youngstown is a member only for Football and Basketball and will remain independent for other sports. The United Athletic Conference will not begin conference play until winter 2027; due to fall sports schedules already being set prior to the league's creation.
