= Len Kosmalski =

American basketball player (born 1951)

Personal information
- Born: November 21, 1951 (age 74) Cleveland, Ohio, U.S.
- Listed height: 7 ft 0 in (2.13 m)
- Listed weight: 245 lb (111 kg)

Career information
- High school: Maple Heights (Maple Heights, Ohio)
- College: Tennessee (1971–1974)
- NBA draft: 1974: 2nd round, 24th overall pick
- Drafted by: Kansas City–Omaha Kings
- Position: Center
- Number: 55

Career history
- 1974–1975: Kansas City–Omaha Kings
- 1976–1977: Stella Azzurra Roma

Career highlights
- 3× First-team All-SEC (1972–1974)
- Stats at NBA.com
- Stats at Basketball Reference

Leonard J. Kosmalski (born November 21, 1951) is an American former basketball player. He played college basketball for the Tennessee Volunteers and professionally for the National Basketball Association's Kansas City Kings.

Kosmalski, a 7-foot center from Maple Heights High School in Ohio, was a three-year starter for the Tennessee Volunteers and a three-time first team All-Southeastern Conference pick and was a starter on the Vols' 1972 SEC championship team. For his college career, Kosmalski averaged 17.7 points and 8.4 rebounds per game. During the 2012–13 season, Kosmalski was named an SEC legend as a part of the 2013 SEC tournament.

Following the close of his college career, Kosmalski was drafted in both the 1974 NBA draft by the Kansas City–Omaha Kings (24th pick overall), and by the Utah Stars in the American Basketball Association Draft (20th overall). Kosmalski played parts of two seasons for the Kings, averaging 1.4 points and 1.9 rebounds in 76 games. He then played a season in Italy for Stella Azzurra Roma.

His son Landry Kosmalski is the current head basketball coach at Swarthmore College.

== Career statistics ==
Legend
GP	Games played	GS	Games started	MPG	Minutes per game
FG%	Field goal percentage	3P%	3-point field goal percentage	FT%	Free throw percentage
RPG	Rebounds per game	APG	Assists per game	SPG	Steals per game
BPG	Blocks per game	PPG	Points per game	**Bold**	Career high

=== NBA ===
==== Regular season ====
Year	Team	GP	MPG	FG%	FT%	RPG	APG	SPG	BPG	PPG
1974–75	Kansas City–Omaha	**67**	6.2	.398	**.828**	1.8	.6	.1	.1	1.3
1975–76	Kansas City	9	**10.3**	**.400**	.571	**2.8**	**1.3**	**.3**	**.4**	**2.2**
Career		76	6.7	.398	.778	1.9	.7	.1	.1	1.4

==== Playoffs ====
Year	Team	GP	MPG	FG%	FT%	RPG	APG	SPG	BPG	PPG
1975	Kansas City–Omaha	6	4.8	.667	.667	1.7	.8	.2	.0	1.0
