= Sisters of St. Joseph of the Third Order of St. Francis =

Roman Catholic congregation for women

The Sisters of St. Joseph of the Third Order of St. Francis (SSJ-TOSF) is a Roman Catholic Franciscan religious congregation for women. The Congregation was established in 1901. Their motherhouse was in Stevens Point, Wisconsin in the Diocese of La Crosse.

== History ==
The Congregation was founded on July 1, 1901, by 46 former members of the School Sisters of St. Francis who wished to see to the educational needs of the children of Polish immigrants. They began under the name "Polish Sisters of St. Joseph". A 35-acre parcel of land, which contained a pine grove and small farmhouse, was purchased in 1901 from the Bulmanski Family by Rev. Luke Pescinski. The cornerstone of the motherhouse, St. Joseph's Convent Stevens Point, Wisconsin was laid the following year. In 1902, the building was opened as the St. Joseph Polish Academy.

By 1926 the sisters were serving in 49 schools in five states. Provinces were established in Wisconsin, Ohio, and Illinois. The sisters expanded their work to health care in 1938 with the opening of River Pines Sanitorium outside of Stevens Point. They subsequently operated hospitals and nursing facilities in Colorado, Michigan, Mississippi, Nebraska, Ohio, and Wisconsin. In 1945 the name of the congregation was changed to the "Sisters of St. Joseph of the Third Order of St. Francis".

In 1949, the sisters purchased fifteen acres adjacent to their provincial convent, and founded Marymount Hospital in Garfield Heights, Ohio. "The Village at Marymount" is on the hospital campus. Marymount Place is an assisted living facility, while St. Joseph's Villa offers continuing care. Clare Hall provides palliative and hospice care.

In 1962 sisters were sent to Puerto Rico and Peru, in 1971 to Brazil, and in 1981 to South Africa. In 1967 the Rice Lake Franciscan Sisters merged with the SSJ-TOSF; 32 sisters joined the Chicago Province. In 1990 one centralized governance structure replaced the former three provinces. The Central Service Offices were located to St. Joseph Motherhouse in Stevens Point.

== Present Day ==
As of 2019, there were 196 sisters, more than half were over the age of eighty, and 28 still resided in Stevens Point. The sisters announced that they were relocating from Stevens Point to Marymount Place in Garfield Heights, Ohio. Sister Michelle Wronkowski said, "We are in the early stages of relocating the sisters who may need more assisted care.”

In 2021, the Congregation's mother house in Stevens Point was sold to General Capital Group to be developed into affordable senior and family apartment units, with part of the property being dedicated to the city as a public park.

== Ministry ==
The Sisters of St. Joseph of the Third Order of St. Francis sponsor Trinity High School (Garfield Heights, Ohio), Regina High School (Warren, Michigan), and the Bartlett Learning Center, Inc.: Bartlett, Illinois.

The Sisters continue their role as founder and sponsor of Marymount Hospital, and since 1995, a member of the Cleveland Clinic health system.

Sisters now work in housing, respite care, and care for the developmentally challenged.
