= Lorain High School =

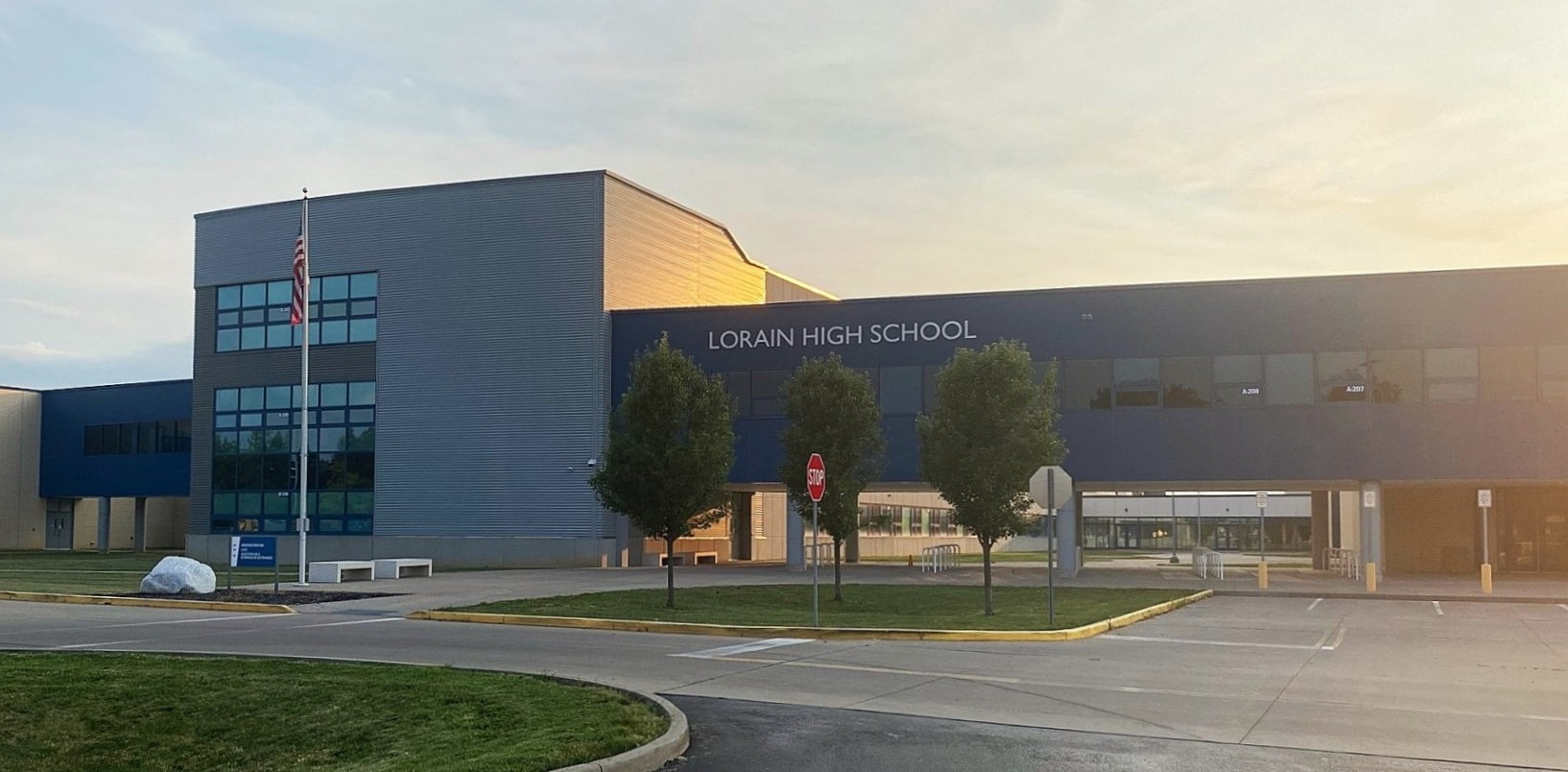

Location
- 2600 Ashland Avenue; Lorain, Ohio 44052; 41.464006°N 82.180161°W

Information
- Type: Public, Coeducational high school
- Established: 1874
- School district: Lorain City School District
- NCES District ID: 3904426
- Superintendent: Dr. Jeffrey Graham
- NCES School ID: 390442605326
- Principal: Melissa Cheers
- Teaching staff: 99.45 (on an FTE basis)
- Grades: 9–12
- Enrollment: 1,773 (2024–25)
- Student to teacher ratio: 17.83
- Colors: Navy blue and Silver
- Fight song: Our Director
- Athletics conference: Lake Erie League
- Team name: Titans
- Closed: 1995
- Re-established: 2010
- Former Mascot: Steelmen
- Former Color(s): Black and Gold
- Former yearbook: The Scimitar
- Website: https://lhs.lorainschools.org/

Lorain High School is part of Lorain City School District in Lorain, Ohio and was founded in 1876, beginning as a two-year high school course. In 1879, the first graduating class consisted of three members. By 1883, the high school curriculum was expanded to three years and in 1889, it was expanded to four years.

In 1995, Lorain High School was closed and became Lorain Middle School, which was later closed in 2005. In the fall of 2010, following the merger of Lorain Admiral King High School and Lorain Southview High School, Lorain High School reopened as the Lorain High School Titans, with navy blue and silver as their colors and operated in the former Lorain Southview High School building as construction began for the new building.

The all new Lorain High School complex opened in 2016.

== History ==
Prior to the organization of the area's first public school, subscription classes were taught by David Smith of Amherst. These classes were held in an old log cabin location at the intersection of Oberlin Avenue and First Street.

On November 9, 1827, the house holders of the village met to discuss the education of their children. A school board was elected and two hundred dollars was appropriated for the purpose of building a schoolhouse for the youngsters of Lorain. It was suggested that a schoolhouse to be built on the west side of town; later, it was agreed upon and a small building was constructed. Miss Lucria Smith was employed to teach the boys and girls who were of school age.

After twenty years of service, the little schoolhouse became inadequate and classes were held in the old meetinghouse at the corner of Washington and West Erie Avenues. When the village of Charleston was incorporated in 1836, it became part of the township system. A lot was, therefore, set aside for school use, although no schoolhouse was built on it for several years.

During 1853, a two-story frame building was constructed on Fourth Street. This was the only schoolhouse within the limits of the town until 1870 when a four-room, two story brick building was completed. The cost of this building, which later became a part of the high school, was fifteen thousand dollars. The building site had been purchased for an additional two thousand dollars.

As early as 1862 there was a tax levied for the township schools, and the first school census that same year showed 187 people of school age living in (Lorain). By 1872, the number increased to 199. In 1871, the first formal adoption of textbooks occurred and the students soon after began using McGuffery's readers, Ray's arithmetic and Harvey's grammar books.

Strictly speaking, the public schools of the city of Lorain began in 1874 when Lorain became incorporated. Benjamin F. Bellows was the first superintendent. He, along with one assistant, Miss Kirkbridge, were the entire teaching staff. The following year, Miss Hannah E. Burett became the third member of the faculty.

In 1876, the schools were divided into primary, grammar and high school departments. A two-year high school course was developed and in 1879 the first class, consisting of two boys and one girl, was graduated from Lorain High School. By 1883, the high school curriculum was expanded to three years; in 1889, it was expanded to four years.

The first wing of Lorain High School was completed in 1916 and dedication exercises were held on May 12 of that year. The second wing of the building was completed in 1917 and the two wings included ninety two rooms, a gymnasium-stage and an auditorium.

Located at Sixth Street and Washington Avenue, Lorain High School was expanded and remodeled three times since the second wing of the high school was built in 1917 before closing in 1995. In the late 1930s, an Arts building was completed when it became necessary to expand the industrial arts program. In 1962, a three unit gymnasium and a new home economics department were built and a new cafeteria and a two-level media center were added in 1972.

In 1995, Lorain High School was closed and merged with Admiral King High School, changing the name to Lorain Admiral King High School and remaining in the latter's building. Lorain Middle School was opened that fall in the former Lorain High School building and retained the previous high school's mascot and colors until closing in 2005.

Lorain High School reopened in late August 2010, with their colors being navy blue and silver and the new mascot being the Titans. The high school was previously housed in the former Lorain Admiral King High School building until 2012, where it was moved to the former Lorain Southview High School and the newly constructed Southview Middle School to make way for the construction of Lorain High School at the site of the former Lorain Admiral King High School on 2600 Ashland Avenue.

Grade 9 is located in the Lorain High School Annex at 2321 Fairless Drive, along with Credit Recovery Academy, due to lack of space for the entire student body in the current building. Grades 10-12 are located in Lorain High School at 2270 E 42nd Street.

On October 24, 2012, a groundbreaking ceremony was held at the new site for Lorain High School. The new building's cost amounts to $73 million and will be 330,000 square feet. School officials claim the building will rival college or university buildings and give students a chance to compete with others around the world.

Construction on the new site for Lorain High School was completed in 2016; in time for students to begin attending in August. The doors were opened to students on August 24, 2016.

=== Sports and recreation ===

Physical education in Lorain City Schools is said to have begun in 1894, the year Lorain High School first played a three-game football schedule.

1917 is generally regarded as the turning point in Lorain's physical education program. In that year, the second wing of the high school was completed and it included a gymnasium. Since that time, physical education has been a required course in the schools.

The Lorain Board of Educated purchased a tract of land for a recreation field in 1919. A football field was laid out and a track was constructed on the land known as Longfellow Field. This field had poor drainage, and, as a result, many of the football games and track meets were held on water soaked and muddy grounds.

The 1920s brought an increase in physical education activities. The four junior high schools were built during that time, adding four gymnasiums to the school system. Also, during the early 1920s, Lorain High School joined the Lake Erie League and soon after the Board of Education realized that Longfellow Field was not adequate for playing league games.

In 1927, the Board of Education purchased a fourteen and one-half acres of land on Oberlin Avenue to be used as a stadium for football and track. The field cost $40,000. The public school children agreed to raise $15,000 if the Board of Education gave $25,000. The children raised the money by means of carnivals, candy sales, plays, operettas, paper drives and athletic events.

The football stadium on Oberlin Avenue is a tribute to the hard work of the citizens of Lorain. Originally known as Recreation Field, its name was changed in 1958 to George Daniel Field in honor of the man who served as teacher, coach and athletic director for more than fifty years. George Daniel, a three-sport athlete at Lorain High School at the turn of the century and a track star at Ohio Wesleyan University, coached football at Lorain High School until he was named the first supervisor of physical education.

George Daniel, a 1905 LHS graduate, became Lorain High's second athletic coach in 1910. Although Lorain High School students participated in sports prior to 1911, it was in that year that Daniel was instrumental in forming the "Little Big Four" league, which consisted of Lorain High School, Elyria High School, Sandusky High School, and Norwalk High School. The league later expanded to include Fremont, Bellevue, and Oberlin, and the name was changed to the "Little Big Seven." The two-semester system with promotions twice a year was begun, and the first mid-year graduation was held in 1911, the same year that work on the new Lorain High School building was begun. 1912 was the first year that the Lorain High School football team, under coach Daniel, went undefeated, also achieving this feat in 1914 and 1916.

In 1922 the Lorain High basketball team was winner of the first Ohio High School Athletic Association Class Title.

The school became champion of the Lake Erie League in 1927 for Football.

During the 1960s, Lorain High School played in the Buckeye Conference alongside teams from Findlay, Sandusky, Fremont Ross, Admiral King High School, Mansfield, Marion, and Elyria.

In 2014, the new Lorain High made its first splash real in athletics. The football team made the playoffs for the first time and the basketball team powered to a 25-1 record, reaching the sweet sixteen of the Division I State Tournament.

== Notable alumni ==
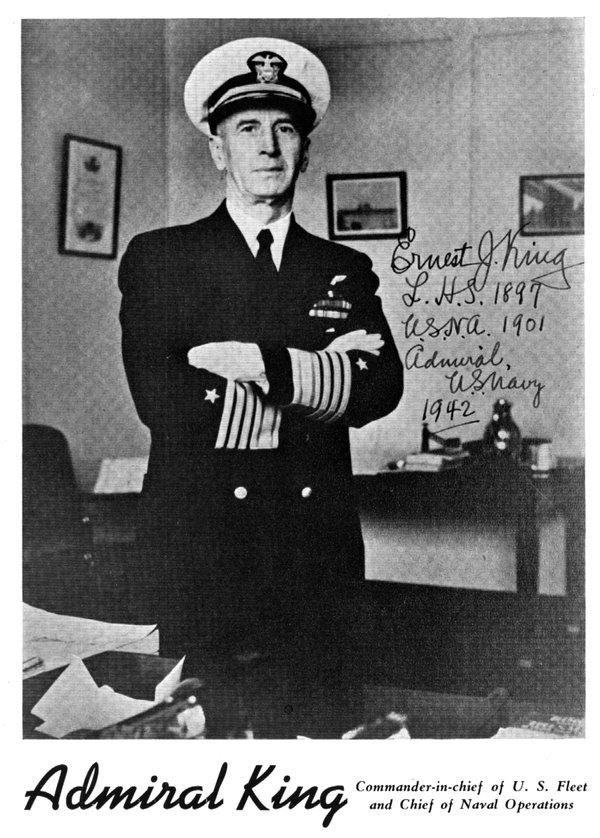
Signed Promotional picture of Admiral King, a notable Lorain High School alumnus.

Many notable people graduated from the former Lorain High School, including:

- Don Novello (Comedian; aka Father Guido Sarducci of SNL fame - 1961)
- Toni Morrison (Nobel Prize– and Pulitzer Prize–winning novelist - 1949)
- Stevan Dohanos (Artist - )
- General Johnnie E. Wilson (War Hero - 1961)
- Helen Steiner Rice (Writer/Poet - 1918)
- Fleet Admiral Ernest J. King, Class of 1897- 5-star admiral and 9th Chief of Naval Operations
- Bill Rieth, American football player
- Rashod Berry American football player
- Bruce Weigl American Poet
