= Lorain City School District =

School district in Ohio

Lorain City Schools

Address
- 2601 Pole Avenue Lorain, (Lorain County), Ohio, 44052; United States
- Coordinates: 41°26′46″N 82°11′24″W

District information
- Type: Public, Coeducational
- Grades: Pre-Kindergarten–12
- Established: 1875; 151 years ago
- Superintendent: Jeffrey Graham
- NCES District ID: 3904426

Students and staff
- Enrollment: 6,150 (2024–25)
- Teachers: 393.89 (on an FTE basis)
- Student–teacher ratio: 15.61
- Athletic conference: Lake Erie League
- District mascot: Titans
- Colors: Navy and Silver

Other information
- Athletic Director: Bryan Koury
- Website: www.lorainschools.org

The Lorain City School District is a public school district serving the city of Lorain, Ohio, which is located 25 miles west of Cleveland. The district is the tenth largest urban school district in the State of Ohio.

== History ==
Lorain city schools date as far back as 1875. The first Lorain high school was established in 1875. The high school began as a two-year high school course. In 1879, the first graduating class consisted of three members. By 1878 there were 68 students enrolled in Lorain's two schools. Quickly the school district grew to have 6 school buildings, and 2,600 children enrolled in Lorain City Schools by 1903. By 1972 there were 17,508 students enrolled in the public school system.

In 1995, the then Lorain High School (Located on Washington Avenue and 6th Street) was closed and became Lorain Middle School. At this point the school district had two high schools Southview and Admiral King High School.

Lorain City Schools went through a revitalization project starting in the 2000s. This revitalization project was funded through a bond issue voted on by the city in 2001. which resulted in the first rebuilding of several elementary schools and middle schools. The revitalization project resulted in buildings being torn down and rebuilt nearby where the old buildings stood. Today, many of the new buildings carry the same name. Lorain middle school remained open until 2005 when new middle schools were established. In 2005 Washington, Larkmoor, Palm and Garfield Elementary open as new school buildings, as well as General Johnnie Wilson and Longfellow Middle Schools. Annexes and temporary locations were used during rebuilding of locations.

The plan also called for the eventual opening of one new high school which would re carry the name Lorain High School. The Lorain High School project reunited the two existing high schools which were decreasing in population and in also need of updating. In the fall of 2010, following the merger of Lorain Admiral King High School and Lorain Southview High School, Lorain High School reopened as the Lorain High School Titans. The former Lorain Middle school and original Lorain High was demolished in the summer of 2010. The development plan called for the New Lorain High School to open in the fall of 2016. Since 2010 Lorain High School was housed in the former Lorain Admiral King High School building. Beginning in the fall of 2012, Lorain High School was rehoused in the former Lorain Southview High School and Southview Middle School to make way for the development of the new high schools.

== Schools ==
=== Elementary schools ===
- Admiral King Elementary School (K–5)
- Frank Jacinto Elementary School (PK–5)
- Garfield Elementary School (K–5)
- Hawthorne Elementary School (K–5)
- Larkmoor Elementary School (K–5)
- Rice Elementary School (PK–5)
- Palm Elementary School (K–5)
- Morrison Elementary School(PK–5)
- Washington Elementary School (K–5)
- Dohanos Elementary School (K–5)

=== Middle schools ===
- General Wilson Middle School (6–8)
- Longfellow Middle School (6–8)
- Southview Middle School (6–8)

=== High school ===
The new Lorain High School mascot and logo

Lorain High School reopened in the fall of 2010. At a March 17, 2010 school board meeting, the new high school's name was announced as Lorain High School. On March 31, 2010, the Lorain City School District Board announced the new school colors and nickname for the high school. It has been announced that the school's mascot will be the Titans with the school colors being navy blue and silver.

- Lorain High School Annex (houses the 9th grade class as well as the credit recovery academy and New Beginnings)

== Former Schools ==
=== Lorain High School ===
The original Lorain High School was located on Washington Avenue and 6th Street and was demolished in the summer of 2010. The original school colors were lavender and purple; its fight colors were black and gold. The original mascot was the Steelmen which until the mid to late '80s was represented by a robot-type figure which was later replaced by a muscular steel worker. Sports teams competed in the Buckeye Conference and Erie Shore Conference.

=== Lorain Admiral King High School ===
Lorain Admiral King High School crest.

Formerly the largest high school in the Lorain City School District, Admiral King High School opened in 1961. Admiral King High School was named for Lorain native Fleet Admiral Ernest J. King a former Chief of Naval Operations and Commander-in-Chief of the United States Fleet.

The school was renamed Lorain Admiral King High School when it was merged with Lorain High School in 1995. The school's colors were navy blue and gold, the mascot was the ram, and the sports teams were known as the Admirals. The school was previously a member of the Buckeye Conference, the Erie Shore Conference, and the Lake Erie League. The tunes to the school's alma mater and fight song were "Eternal Father, Strong to Save" and "Anchors Aweigh", respectively.

=== Lorain Southview High School ===
Southview High School was completed in 1969. Its school colors were red, white and originally baby blue (which was later changed to navy). The sports teams were known as the Saints, and played in the NEOC and Erie Shore Conferences. The mascot was a young boy dressed as an angel with a black eye and a patch on his elbow. The school's fight song was "When the Saints Go Marching In."

Southview was previously a member of the Lake Erie League. Their Model UN, Army JROTC, wrestling team, and marching band were given many honors. During the short lived small school years, the small schools were called: Leadership, Pride and Arts.

The school board decided to close Southview High School at the end of the 2009–2010 school year and merge the Saints with the Admirals from Lorain Admiral King High School. Starting with the 2012 school year, Southview High School was the temporary home of Lorain High School. Once the new high school was erected on the site of the former Admiral King High School, all students then transferred there.

=== Alternative Schools ===
- Credit Recovery Academy
- Lorain K-12 Digital
- New Beginnings Academy
