= Cleveland Clinic Marymount Hospital =

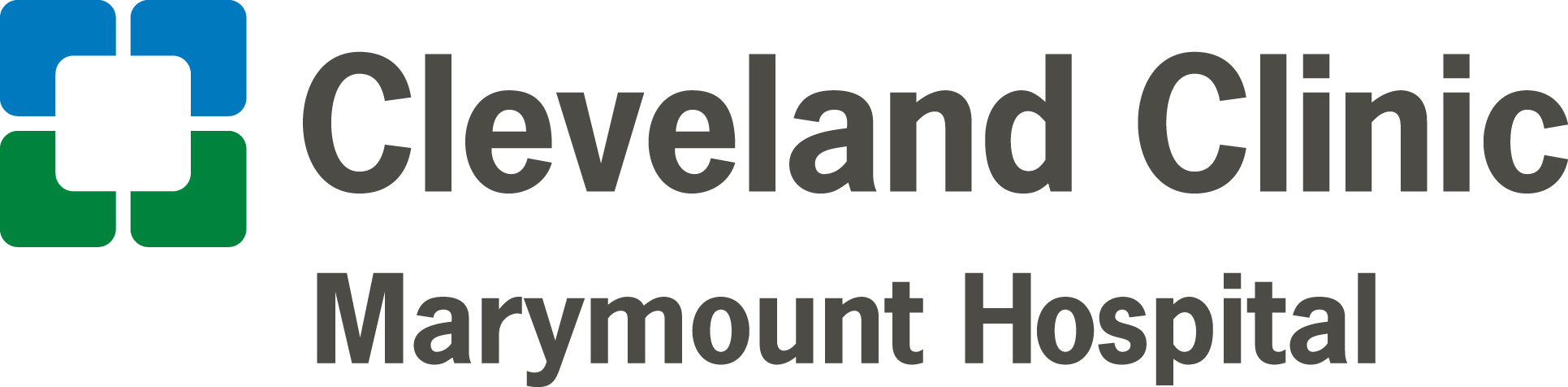

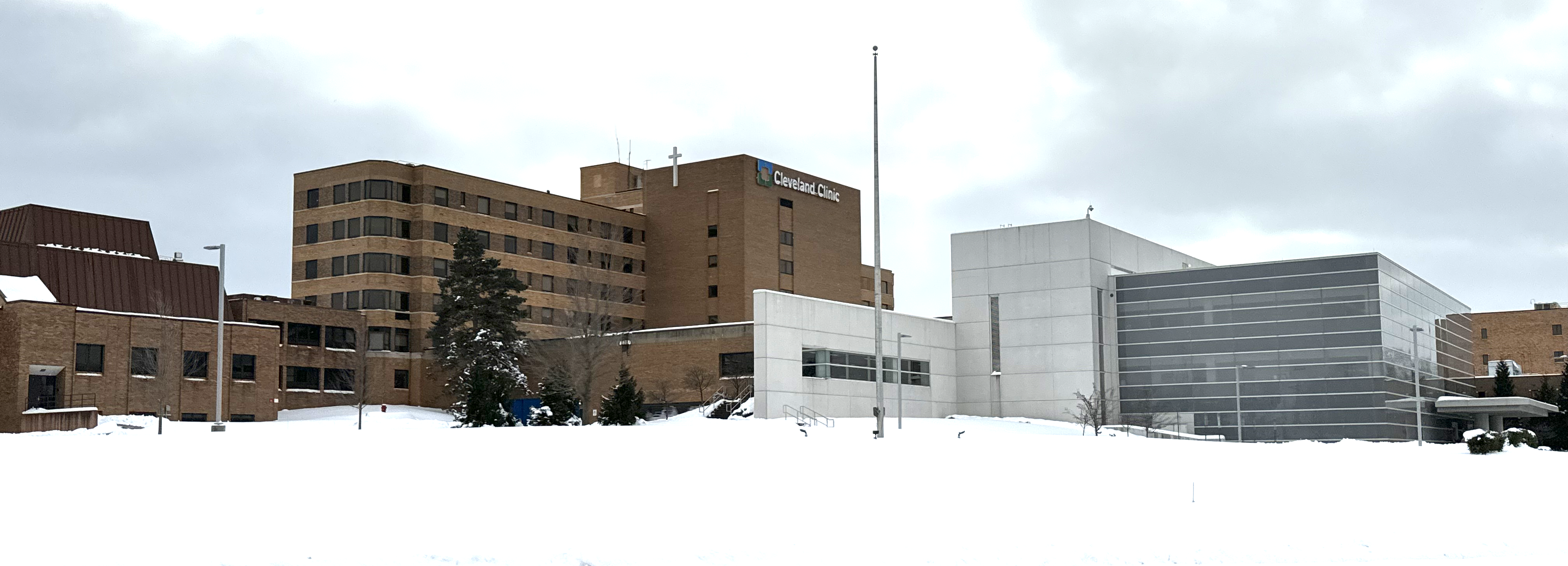

Geography
- Location: 12300 McCracken Rd, Garfield Heights, Ohio, United States
- Coordinates: 41°25′15.69″N 81°35′57.08″W

Services
- Beds: 322
- Helipad: FAA LID: 03OI

History
- Opened: 1949

Links
- Website: Official site

Cleveland Clinic Marymount Hospital is a 322-bed acute-care facility located in Garfield Heights, Ohio. The hospital primarily serves southern and southeastern Cuyahoga County. Marymount provides cancer care, cardiology, diabetes, emergency, orthopaedics, outpatient rehabilitation, stroke care, vascular surgery, and women's health. The hospital campus also includes a medical office building, a behavioral health center, Critical Care Tower and Surgery Center.

== History ==
In 1908, the Sisters of St. Joseph of the Third Order of St. Francis came from their motherhouse in Stevens Point, Wisconsin to Ohio to staff schools in Polish parishes. A provincial convent was established in 1926. In 1939, there was a shortage of hospital beds and emergency treatment facilities in the city. The Sisters of Saint Joseph of the Third Order of Saint Francis joined with a group of physicians to solve this problem. They started an advisory board in 1945. Four years later, they received to purchase 15 acres of land next to the Provincial Convent. They borrowed $750,000 to break ground on the facility's building. Marymount Hospital officially opened its doors in October 1949 as a not-for-profit acute-care hospital in Garfield Heights, Ohio, a suburb of Cleveland. The 125-bed hospital was run by the Sisters of Saint Joseph.

Founders of Marymount Hospital include Mother Mary Theobold, Warren Chase, Chester Jablonski, and Edmund Lewandowski. Mother Mary Theobold designed the statue of the Virgin Mary under the title "Our Lady of Grace" that still stands at the hospital main entrance today.

During the 1950s and 60s, the hospital, led by the Sisters of Saint Joseph, expanded bed capacity, clinical services, and nearly tripled its bed count to 270. In 1959, Saint Joseph's Teaching Annex was added to make room for the School of Practical Nursing that was established in 1960. Soon after, Marymount expanded its services to include medicine, surgery, obstetrics, pediatrics, and psychiatry, outpatient care through the emergency room, and customary diagnosis and therapy services to x-ray and laboratory services. Additionally, Marymount was one of the first hospitals to have a coronary unit, an in-house nurse-training program, psychiatric services, and clinical engineering. In 1980, another wave of renovations and expansions began as well as supportive endeavors with St. Alexis Hospital Medical Center and Saint Vincent Charity Hospital and Health Center. Marymount Hospital joined the University Hospitals Case Medical Center of Cleveland network of affiliates in 1990. In 1995, the hospital, along with seven other nearby community hospitals, became part of Cleveland Clinic. The partnership provides residents the ability to access the physicians and technology of Cleveland Clinic's medical and research center. Both entities were now able to share resources and create efficiencies in clinical and operational areas.

== Today ==
The Sisters of St. Joseph of the Third Order of St. Francis continue their role as founder and sponsor. The Sisters remain actively involved in the governance and strategic planning of the hospital. Marymount is accredited by The Joint Commission, the Commission on Cancer, and College of American Pathologists. It is also certified by The Joint Commission as a Primary Stroke Center and has received The Gold Plus Stroke Quality Achievement Award. Intergenerational Health and Education Campus

== Specialty Services ==
- Behavioral Health Services
- Breast Care & Women's Imaging
- Cancer Program
- Cardiac Services
- Diabetes Education
- Emergency Department
- Hyperbaric Oxygen Therapy
- Laboratory Services
- Orthopaedic Services
- Pain Management Center
- Pulmonary Care Services
- Radiology Services
- Rehabilitation Services
- Sleep Disorders Center
- Stroke Center
- Surgical Services
- Women's Health Services
