= Evelyn Svec Ward =

American fiber artist

- Born: Evelyn Svec; August 15, 1921; Solon, Cuyahoga County, Ohio, U.S.
- Died: April 8, 1989 (aged 67); Cleveland, Cuyahoga County, Ohio, U.S.
- Education: Otterbein University, University of Paris
- Occupation: Fiber artist
- Spouse: William E. Ward

Evelyn Svec Ward (née Evelyn Svec; 1921–1989) was an American fiber artist, she was known for her abstract textile work. She was influenced by Mexican handicrafts and Mexican traditional fiber. She worked at the Cleveland Museum of Art in the textiles department for almost 10 years, before embarking on her career as an artist.

== Early life and education ==
Evelyn Svec was born on August 15, 1921, in Solon, Ohio, to parents Lydia (née Pravda) and Charles Svec. She was raised in Maple Heights, Ohio, and graduated from Maple Heights High School in 1939.

She received a B.A. degree (1943) from Otterbein College (now Otterbein University). One summer in 1952, she studied at University of Paris (Sorbonne).

== Career ==
From 1948 until 1955, Ward had worked at the Cleveland Museum of Art in the textiles department under curator Dorothy G. Payer Sheperd. In 1952, she married William E. Ward (artist), he was an exhibition designer at the Cleveland Museum of Art. They honeymooned in the Oaxaca Valley in Mexico. After their honeymoon, the couple annually traveled to Mexico, a place that influenced her work.

She would use Mexican local materials and fibers in her work including from the maguey cactus (Agave americana), zacate root, and amate bark paper. She expressed in interviews feeling a connection to history through the materials.

== Death and legacy ==
She died in the hospital on April 8, 1989, in Cleveland. In 1991, her work was featured in a postmortem retrospective exhibition at the Cleveland Museum of Art.

Her work can be found in public museum collections including at the Metropolitan Museum of Art, the Art Institute of Chicago, Cleveland Museum of Art, Minneapolis Institute of Art, the Philadelphia Museum of Art, and the Artists Archives of the Western Reserve.
