= Garfield Heights City School District =

School district in Ohio

The Garfield Heights City School District is the public schools system of Garfield Heights, Ohio consisting of five schools and a student enrollment of 3,823 in the 2004-05 school year.

In 1996, The Garfield Heights City Schools system was named a B.E.S.T. district.

== Board of education ==
The Garfield Heights Board of Education consists of five elected members that serve four-year terms, headed by a President and Vice-President.

As of 2023, Garfield Heights' Board of Education consisted of: President Nichelle Daniels, Vice-President Millette King M.Ed, Heather Morrison, Ashley Thomas and Anthony Isom. The Board also has several sub-council positions, such as Vice-Superintendent (who also serves as "Director for Pupil Services"), Director of the Center for Technology, Director for the Center of Business Services, Director of the Center for Social Services, and the Finance treasurer.

Garfield Heights' superintendent, as of 2022, is Dr. Richard Reynolds.

== William Foster Elementary ==
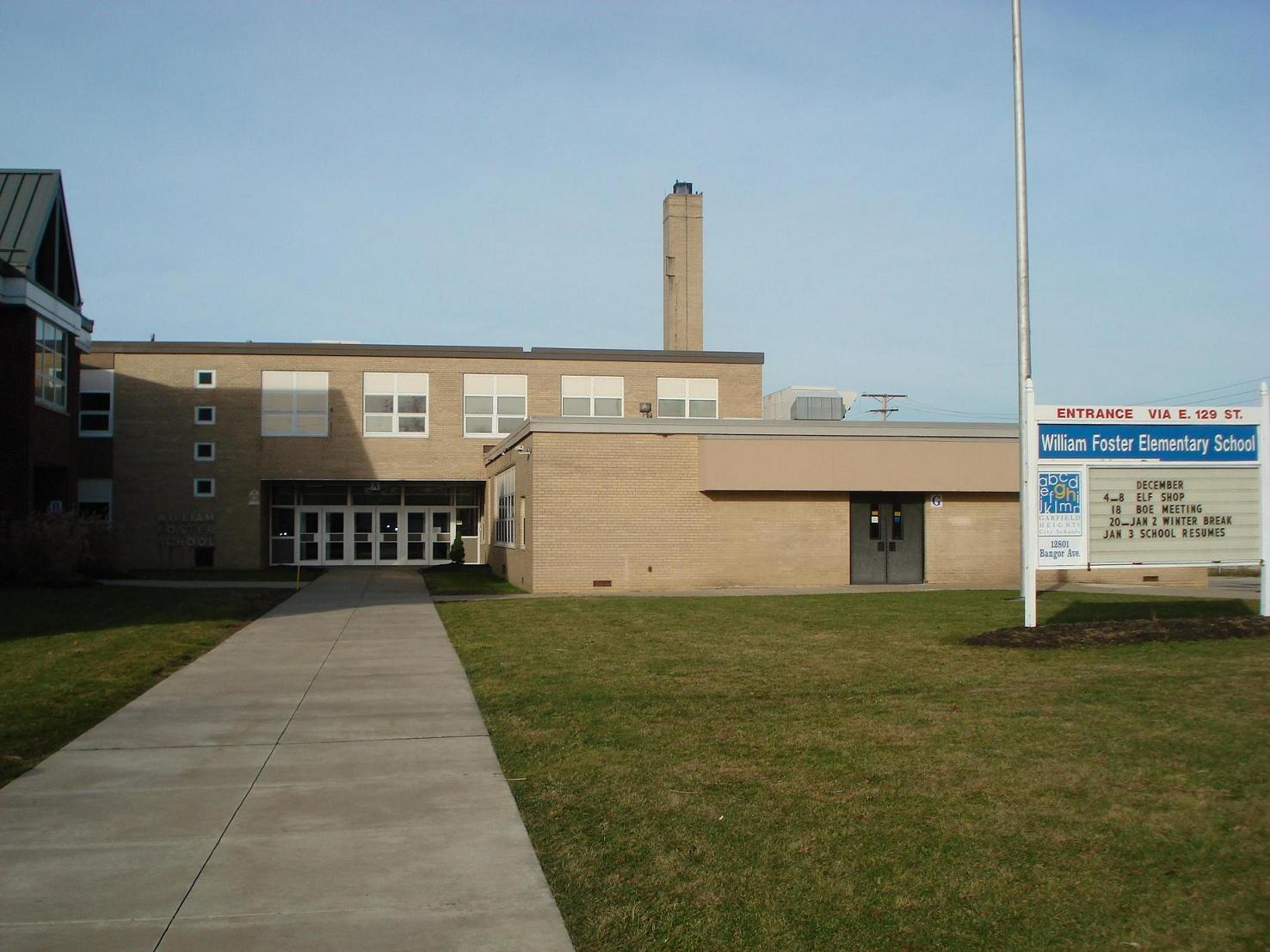
William Foster Elementary, 2006

Named after World War II Medal of Honor recipient William A. Foster, Garfield's first Elementary School serves children Kindergarten through 5th grade, and is currently under Principal Sean Patton and Associate Principal Mrs. Kosta

William Foster Elementary School was built in 1957 and in 2003 an addition was added to the school. William Foster Elementary School has a square foot gardening program. It is the largest of the primary schools in the Garfield Heights system with 850 students.

William Foster Elementary School has been rated an "Excellent" school by the State of Ohio.

== Elmwood Elementary ==
The second of the two Elementary schools in Garfield, located on Turney Road and Elmwood street, is also 1–3 and is administered by Principal Jody Saxton.

Elmwood Elementary was built in 1952, and is undergoing a massive renovation of its classrooms for the 2010-11 school year. Neighboring St. John Lutheran is being used as a temporary school building while Elmwood School is being renovated. St. John Lutheran had a school, but closed in the 2005-06 school year. St. John Lutheran School is attached to St. John Lutheran Church which was established in the 1850s and is considered a historical site in Ohio.

Elmwood School like Maple Leaf School had a distinctive chimney which served as a geographical landmark for the Turney/Granger Neighborhood was taken down in 2010 as part of Elmwood's renovation. The bell campanile of St. John Lutheran Church has replaced the chimney of Elmwood School as the geographical landmark of Turney/Granger.

== Maple Leaf Intermediate ==
The only intermediate school in Garfield, it is located at the corner of Mapleleaf Drive and Turney, servicing grades 4 and 5 under Principal Thomas Matthews (former Principal of William Foster.)

Maple Leaf Intermediate School was built in 1925 with additions added between 1949–1952. In the 1978-79 school year, The Garfield Hts City Schools closed Maple Leaf School. In 1952, the newly founded Roman Catholic Saint Monica's Church used Maple Leaf School for Sunday masses, in 1954 St. Monica's opened its school/church combination, so Maple Leaf wasn't needed anymore. From 1981–92, Maple Leaf School served as the Garfield Hts Senior Center and Historical Society museum. In 1992, The Senior Center moved to the new City Hall Complex. In 1993, The Historical Society moved to a home on Turney Road. From 1993–1996 Maple Leaf School became an alternative school for troubled children.

In the 1996 school year, citing overcrowding in the districts two primary schools-William Foster and Elmwood, the Garfield Hts City School board voted to reopen Maple Leaf School as an Intermediate school. It reopened on 22 August 1996 with fanfare.

From 2004–2006 Maple Leaf School was renovated and updated with the latest technologies and there have been physical renovations of new windows, air conditioning, and other improvements. In the 2010-11 School year, Maple Leaf School is undergoing a massive renovation project. This massive renovation project includes 12 new state-of-the-art classrooms, a separate gym facility and a courtyard. Right now, the school's 1950s gym doubles as the cafeteria and the school must have 4 lunch shifts to accommodate the students. Also in the 2010-11 school year Maple Leaf School gained a new principal.

Maple Leaf school's distinct features are its chimney which serves as a geographical landmark for the neighborhood. The school has two owls above the front doors facing Turney Road. As of 1/3/2011 Maple Leaf School lost its distinct chimney as part of a massive renovation.

== Garfield Heights Middle School ==
The building that currently serves as Garfield Heights' Middle school (or 'Junior High', although that term is not used in Garfield Heights) served as the High School until the move at the end of Winter Break, January 2003. Before that, the Middle School-building was a 76-year-old building next to where the new High School was being built (which started life off as a High School itself.)

Garfield Hts Middle School was built in 1962 originally it was the high school complex until 2003. The Middle School has about 117,645 square feet (10,929.6 m^{2}) of space. It was designed by George S. Voinovich AIA.

Garfield Heights middle school serves grades 6, 7 and 8, and up until the fall 2003 school year started, was under Principal Terrance Olszewski. He was promoted to principal of the high school. The current principal is Mr. Chris Sauer and the assistant principals are Mr. Michael Frielino, Mrs. Leslie Tranter, and Mr. Paul Glazer.

== Garfield Heights High School ==
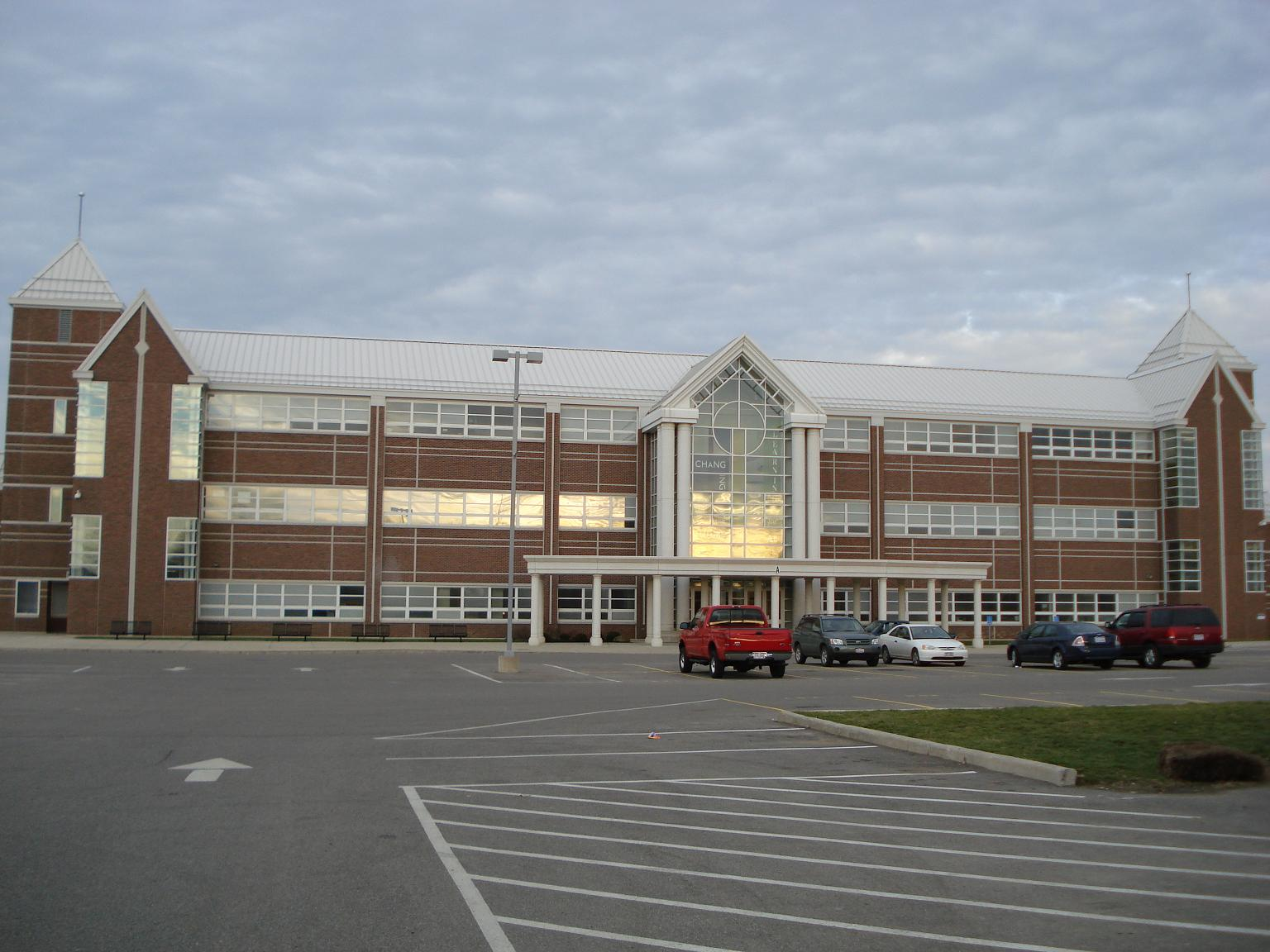
New Garfield Heights High School building

The building that currently serves as the Garfield Heights High School was built in 2001, and was completed and opened in January 2003. The new building was designed by a design team: Dale L Swearingen, AIA, Principal-in-Charge; Bruce Fisher, RA, Project Manager; Greg Turner, RA, Senior Project Manager; Dave Sablotny, RA, Project Architect; Melanie Osiecki, Interiors by FPS Architects & Engineers, Inc. of Cleveland.

At a cost of $30,125,000 and a total area of 224,164 sq ft (20,825.5 m^{2})., the building is capable of holding 1,400 students and staff.

The second, principal of (the new) Garfield Heights High School is Ms. Tammy Hager.

Ground was broken next to the High School (at the location of the former middle school) on the Performing Arts complex, housing an auditorium and student arts and music rooms, set to be completed in the 2007-08 school year.

== Former schools ==
=== "Garfield Heights Middle School" ===
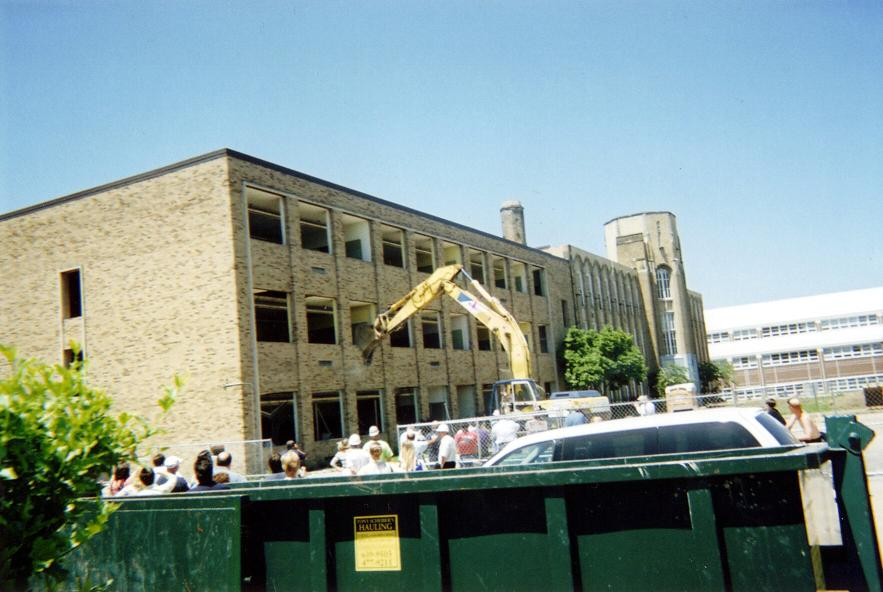
Demolition, June 2003

The former Garfield Heights High School was built in the 1950s, and housed one of the city's fallout shelters. It was three stories, with a basement. The basement consisted mainly of a secondary gymnasium and secondary male locker rooms (usually used for visiting teams of several sports.)

When a new high school was built, this building was turned into Garfield Heights Middle School. It stayed Garfield Heights Middle School until Winter Break (2002–03), when the students were sent to the then high school, and the high school students were moved to their new building right next to this one. In the spring, an auction was held for most of the older items left in the school, such as out-of-date desks, and an old school bus. The building was demolished on the last day of school of the 2002-03 school year, shortly after school let out, so the students could watch. Although the news reported a wrecking ball would be used, initial destruction was started by then-superintendent Ronald Victor, who destroyed a small wall of the building with an excavator, after which a construction worker took over. Once the workers stopped, for about five minutes, teachers and students were allowed to run up and take a brick, then ordered to leave as a fence was put up around the school. By the end of summer 2003, the building had been completely removed and the school ground was turned into a field until work could start on the Performing Arts complex for the new high school.
