= Eric Beverly =

American football player (born 1974)

Profile
- Positions: Center, Guard

Personal information
- Born: March 28, 1974 (age 52); Cleveland, Ohio, U.S.
- Listed height: 6 ft 3 in (1.91 m)
- Listed weight: 300 lb (136 kg)

Career information
- High school: Bedford
- College: Miami (OH)
- NFL draft: 1997: undrafted

Career history
- Detroit Lions (1997–2003); Atlanta Falcons (2004–2006); Detroit Lions (2007)*
- * Offseason or practice squad member only

Career NFL statistics
- Games played: 137
- Games started: 48
- Stats at Pro Football Reference

Eric Beverly (born March 28, 1974, in Cleveland, Ohio) is an American former professional football player who was a tight end for the Detroit Lions and the Atlanta Falcons in the National Football League (NFL). He played College football for the Miami RedHawks.

== On the field ==
Beverly signed with the Lions as an undrafted free agent in 1997, and played for Detroit for seven seasons before signing with Atlanta in 2004. He was released by Atlanta after the 2006 season. He returned to the Lions before the 2007 season, but abruptly announced his retirement during the first week of training camp.

Beverly spent his first seven years as an offensive lineman, and was only switched to tight end when he went to Atlanta. He caught the only pass of his career in his final game.

== Off the field ==
In 2000, Beverly was a corporate purchasing intern for Kmart Corporation and from 2001 - 2003 he served as an elected team representative with the NFL Players Association. He also had an internship with the NFL league office working to enhance the Player Development Brochure and sections of the Player Development Operations and Procedures Manual.

Beverly also completed the Harvard Business School's NFL Business Management and Entrepreneurial Program in 2006.

== Volunteer work and charity ==
Embracing the community through volunteerism and philanthropy, his charitable efforts have included the American Red Cross, Gilda's Club of Metro Detroit and Atlanta, City Mission (Detroit, MI), and Crossroads Ministries (Atlanta, GA). Beverly has received numerous honors for his athletic success, humanitarianism, and aggressive efforts in the fight against breast cancer.

The Eric R. Beverly Family Foundation is a non-profit organization working to promote breast cancer awareness while raising money for programs supporting breast cancer survivors.

The mission of the foundation is to provide programs and activities that unite both men and women in promoting education, increasing awareness, and providing support and resources for families who have been touched by breast cancer.

Beverly and his wife, Danielle Beverly, a breast cancer survivor, reside in the Atlanta, Georgia area. He currently works for the University of Georgia Athletic Association in Athens, Georgia

Beverly is a graduate of Bedford High School in Bedford, Ohio, the same school as NFL players Chris Chambers and Lee Evans, and actress Halle Berry.
