= Bill Rieth =

American football player (1916–1999)

No. 6, 54, 3
- Position: Guard / Center

Personal information
- Born: June 20, 1916; Cleveland, Ohio, U.S.
- Died: October 15, 1999 (aged 83); Lorain, Ohio, U.S.
- Listed height: 5 ft 11 in (1.80 m)
- Listed weight: 203 lb (92 kg)

Career information
- High school: Lorain (Ohio)
- College: Carnegie Mellon

Career history
- Cleveland Rams (1941–1942, 1944–1945)

Awards and highlights
- NFL champion (1945)
- Stats at Pro Football Reference

William John Rieth, Jr. (June 20, 1916 – October 15, 1999) was an American professional football guard who played four seasons with the Cleveland Rams of the National Football League (NFL). He played college football at Western Maryland College and Carnegie Mellon University.

== Early life and college ==
William John Rieth, Jr. was born on June 20, 1916, in Cleveland, Ohio. He attended Lorain High School in Lorain, Ohio.

He first played college football for the Western Maryland Green Terror of Western Maryland College, where he earned All-Maryland honors. He transferred to play for the Carnegie Tech Tartans of the Carnegie Institute of Technology and lettered in 1938. The 1938 Tartans were awarded the Lambert Trophy, distinguishing them as the best college football team in the East. They were invited to their first and only bowl game in school history, the Sugar Bowl, where they lost to national champion TCU, 15–7.

== Professional career ==
Rieth signed with the Cleveland Rams of the National Football League (NFL) in 1941. He played in six games, starting one, for the Rams during the 1941 season. He appeared in ten games, starting four, in 1942. Rieth became a free agent after the 1942 season and later re-signed with the Rams in 1944. He played in nine games, starting three, in 1944 and recorded one interception. He appeared in one game for the Rams in 1945 and was released later that year.

== Later life ==
Rieth was inducted into the Lorain Sports Hall of Fame in 1970. His Lorain Sports Hall of Fame bio credits him with helping "revitalize Lorain St. Mary High football in late 1940’s". He died on October 15, 1999, in Lorain, Ohio.
