= Rashod Berry =

American football player (born 1996)

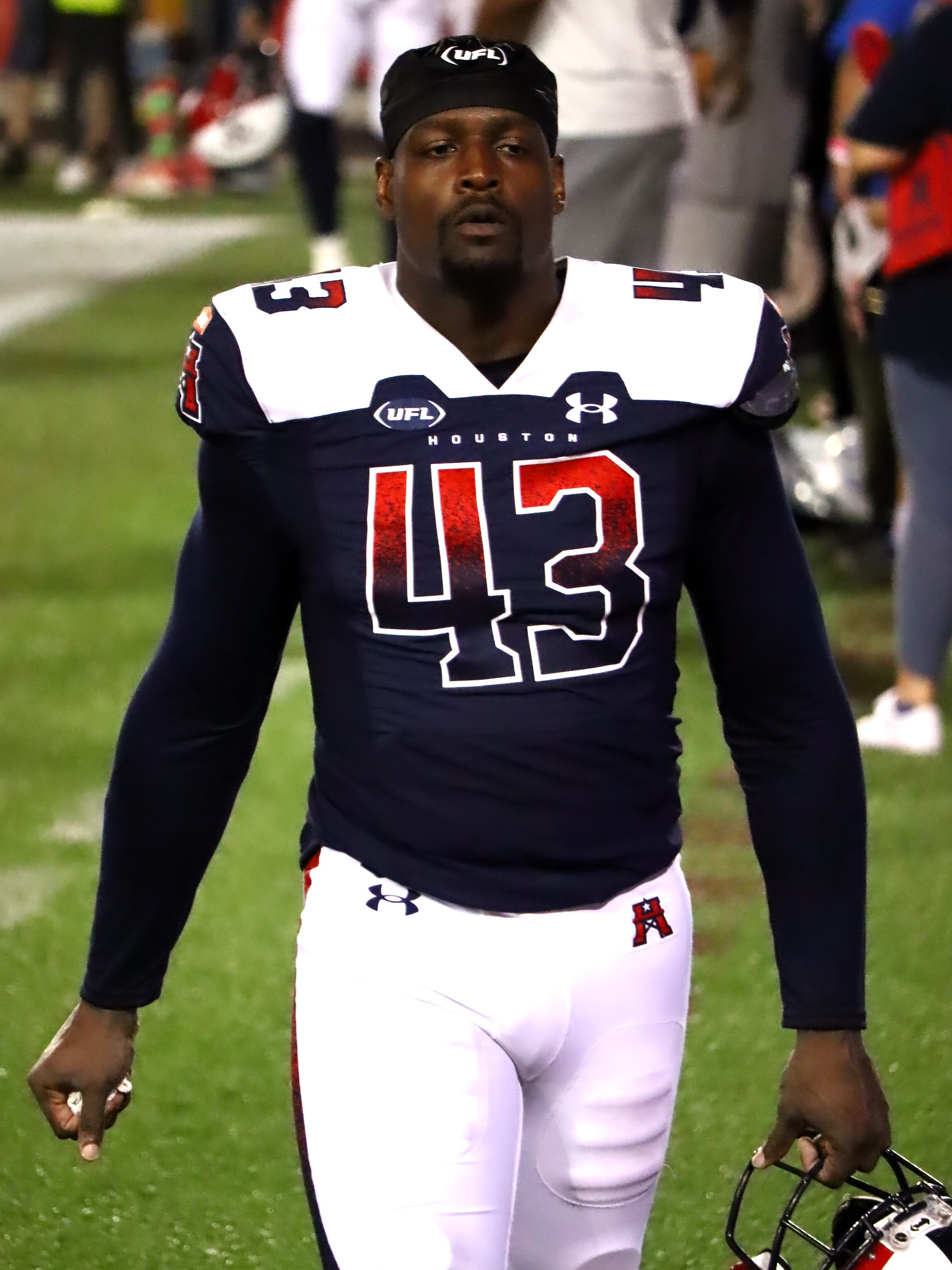
- Berry with the Houston Roughnecks in 2025

Profile
- Position: Linebacker

Personal information
- Born: October 14, 1996 (age 30); Lorain, Ohio, U.S.
- Listed height: 6 ft 4 in (1.93 m)
- Listed weight: 255 lb (116 kg)

Career information
- High school: Lorain
- College: Ohio State (2015–2019)
- NFL draft: 2020: undrafted

Career history
- New England Patriots (2020); Detroit Lions (2021); Jacksonville Jaguars (2022)*; Indianapolis Colts (2022); San Antonio Brahmas (2025); Houston Roughnecks (2025)
- * Offseason or practice squad member only

Career NFL statistics as of 2023
- Total tackles: 4
- Stats at Pro Football Reference

Rashod Berry (born October 14, 1996) is an American football linebacker. He played college football for Ohio State.

== Early life ==
Born in 1996, Berry played basketball and football at Lorain High School. A wide receiver and defensive end in high school, he went on to play as a tight end for five years at Ohio State, though for his freshman year he was listed as a defensive end. He accumulated 17 receptions for 198 yards and four touchdowns.

== Professional career ==
Pre-draft measurables
Height	Weight	Arm length	Hand span
6 ft 2 7/8 in (1.90 m)	263 lb (119 kg)	34 3/4 in (0.88 m)	9 3/4 in (0.25 m)
All values from Pro Day

=== New England Patriots ===
Berry was signed by the New England Patriots as an undrafted free agent following the 2020 NFL draft on May 5, 2020. He was waived during final roster cuts on September 5, 2020, and signed to the team's practice squad the next day. He was elevated to the active roster on October 17 and December 5 for the team's weeks 6 and 13 games against the Denver Broncos and Los Angeles Chargers, and reverted to the practice squad after each game. He made his NFL debut in the Broncos game. He was promoted to the active roster on January 2, 2021.

On August 15, 2021, Berry was waived by the Patriots.

=== Detroit Lions ===
On August 18, 2021, Berry signed with the Detroit Lions. He was waived on August 31, 2021 and re-signed to the practice squad the next day, but released the following day. He was re-signed on October 6. He was promoted to the active roster on December 4.

On March 10, 2022, Berry re-signed with the Lions. He was waived on May 10.

=== Jacksonville Jaguars ===
On May 11, 2022, Berry was claimed by the Jacksonville Jaguars. He was waived on August 30, 2022. He was re-signed to the practice squad on October 12.

=== Indianapolis Colts ===
On January 4, 2023, Berry was signed by the Indianapolis Colts off the Jaguars practice squad. On June 29, 2023, Berry was suspended indefinitely by the NFL for violating the league's policy on gambling. Shortly after the suspension was announced, Berry was waived by the Colts along with teammate Isaiah Rodgers Sr.

On April 18, 2024, Berry was reinstated by the NFL.

=== San Antonio Brahmas ===
Berry signed with the San Antonio Brahmas of the United Football League on August 1, 2024.

=== Houston Roughnecks ===
On April 16, 2025, Berry was claimed off waivers by the Houston Roughnecks.
