= Jerry Schuplinski =

American football coach (born 1977)

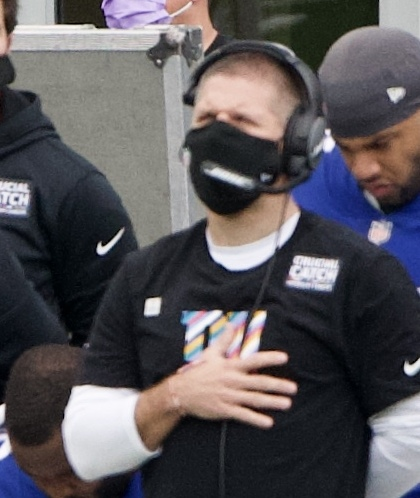
- Schuplinski in 2020

Houston Texans
- Title: Quarterbacks coach

Personal information
- Born: April 4, 1977 (age 49); Garfield Heights, Ohio, U.S.

Career information
- College: John Carroll

Career history
- John Carroll (2000–2001) Graduate assistant; Trinity HS (OH) (2002–2006) Head coach; Case Western Reserve (2007–2012) Special teams coordinator & linebackers coach; New England Patriots (2013–2018); Offensive assistant (2013-2015); Assistant quarterbacks coach (2016-2018); Miami Dolphins (2019) Assistant quarterbacks coach; New York Giants (2020–2021) Quarterbacks coach; Las Vegas Raiders (2022-2023); Senior offensive assistant (2022); Tight ends coach (2023); Los Angeles Rams (2024) Senior offensive assistant; Houston Texans (2025–present); Senior offensive assistant & pass game specialist (2025); Quarterbacks coach (2026–present)

Awards and highlights
- 3× Super Bowl champion (XLIX, LI, LIII)

Jerry Schuplinski (born April 4, 1977) is an American football coach who is currently the quarterbacks coach with the Houston Texans of the National Football League (NFL). Most recently, he had been the tight ends coach for the Las Vegas Raiders. Prior to that, he was an assistant coach for Case Western Reserve for six seasons before becoming a part of the New England Patriots' staff in 2013. Schuplinski was part of the Patriots coaching staffs that won Super Bowl XLIX, Super Bowl LI, and Super Bowl LIII.

== Coaching career ==
=== John Carroll ===
In 2000, Schuplinski was hired at John Carroll as a graduate assistant.

=== Trinity High School ===
In 2002, Schuplinski was hired as the head coach of Trinity High School. He was also a math teacher and the athletic director there.

=== Case Western Reserve ===
In 2007, Schuplinski was hired as the special teams coordinator and linebackers coach for Case Western Reserve under head coach Greg Debeljak.

=== New England Patriots ===
In 2013, Schuplinski was hired by the New England Patriots as an offensive assistant under head coach Bill Belichick. This was because Schuplinski, Patriots' offensive coordinator Josh McDaniels and Patriots' director of player personnel Nick Caserio played together at John Carroll University in the mid-1990s. He won his first Super Bowl when the Patriots defeated the Seattle Seahawks in Super Bowl XLIX at the end of the 2014 season.

In 2016, he was promoted to assistant quarterbacks coach, and helped coach rookie Jacoby Brissett and backup Jimmy Garoppolo. On February 5, 2017, Schuplinski was part of the Patriots coaching staff that won Super Bowl LI. In the game, the Patriots defeated the Atlanta Falcons by a score of 34–28 in overtime. Schuplinski won his third Super Bowl title when the Patriots defeated the Los Angeles Rams in Super Bowl LIII, his last season with the team.

=== Miami Dolphins ===
On February 8, 2019, Schuplinski was hired by the Miami Dolphins as their quarterbacks coach under head coach Brian Flores.

=== New York Giants ===
On January 13, 2020, Schuplinski was hired by the New York Giants as their quarterbacks coach under his former Patriots co-worker Joe Judge. He was let go after the 2021 season.

=== Las Vegas Raiders ===
On March 7, 2022, the Las Vegas Raiders hired Schuplinski as their senior offensive assistant coach. The following year on March 8, 2023, he was promoted to tight ends coach.

=== Los Angeles Rams ===
On March 8, 2024, the Los Angeles Rams announced they had hired Schuplinski to serve as a senior offensive assistant.

=== Houston Texans ===
On February 21, 2025, Schuplinksi was hired by the Houston Texans as their senior offensive assistant/pass game specialist. On February 26, 2026, Schuplinski was promoted to the role of quarterbacks coach following the firing of Jerrod Johnson.
