= Dorothy G. Shepherd =

Museum curator and historian

Dorothy G. Payer Shepherd
- Born: 15 August 1916; Welland, Ontario, Canada
- Died: August 13, 1992 (aged 75); Asheville, North Carolina, US

Academic work
- Discipline: History
- Sub-discipline: Near Eastern and Islamic Art
- Institutions: Cleveland Museum of Art; Cooper Hewitt, Smithsonian Design Museum; Monuments, Fine Arts, and Archives program Case Western Reserve University

Dorothy G. Payer Shepherd (15 August 1916 – 13 August 1992) was a museum curator and historian specialising in medieval textiles and ancient Near Eastern and Islamic art. During the Second World War she served with the Monuments, Fine Arts, and Archives program.

== Career ==
Shepherd finished her undergraduate degree in Oriental Civilizations from the University of Michigan in 1939 and following this with a master's degree in 1940. In 1944, she was awarded her PhD from New York University’s Institute of Fine Arts. From 1942 to 1944 she also worked as an assistant curator of decoration at what is now the Cooper Hewitt, Smithsonian Design Museum.

Between 1945 and 1947 she travelled to London, Luxembourg, Frankfurt and Berlin with the Office of War Information for the Monuments, Fine Arts and Archives Division of the U.S. Military Government in Germany.

After returning to the United States in 1947 Shepherd worked as the assistant curator of Textiles at the Cleveland Museum of Art. In 1954, she was promoted to the curator of textiles and Near Eastern art, a position she held until retiring in 1981. She was one of very few women museum curators in the United States in the 1960s. Fiber artist Evelyn Svec Ward worked under Sheperd from 1948 until 1955 in the textile department at the Cleveland Museum of Art.

Shepherd also taught Near Eastern art as adjunct professor at Case Western Reserve University.

Shepherd published widely on medieval textiles, ancient Near Eastern and early Islamic art, frequently introducing to scholarship new acquisitions by her institutions. Her foundational chapter on Sasanian art for the Cambridge History of Iran covers architecture, rock reliefs, jewelry, textiles, ceramics and glassware. An endowed fellowship at the Institute of Fine Arts is named in her memory.

== Selected publications ==
- 1964 "Sasanian Art in Cleveland" The Bulletin of the Cleveland Museum of Art vol. 51, No. 4 (Apr., 1964), pp. 66-92
- 1966 “Iran Between East and West” in East and West in Art, edited by Theodore Bowie, pp. 84–105. Bloomington: Indiana University Press.
- 1983 "Sasanian Art" in The Cambridge History of Iran volume 3 (2), edited by Ehsan Yarshater, chapter 29 (a), pp. 1055–1112. Cambridge: Cambridge University Press.
