= Trinity High School (Garfield Heights, Ohio) =

Private, coeducational school in Garfield Heights, Ohio, United States

Location
- 12425 Granger Road; Garfield Heights, (Cuyahoga County), Ohio 44125; United States; 41°25′3.72″N 81°35′46.34″W

Information
- Former names: St. Joseph Academy, Marymount High School
- Type: Private, coeducational
- Motto: Servant Leaders, Critical Thinkers, Life-Long Learners
- Religious affiliations: Roman Catholic, Franciscan
- Established: 1973
- Oversight: Sisters of St. Joseph of the Third Order of St. Francis
- President: William Svoboda
- Principal: William Svoboda
- Assistant Principal: Francine Wisinki
- Grades: 9-12
- Enrollment: 417 (2024)
- Colors: Blue and white
- Fight song: Washington & Lee Swing
- Athletics conference: Chagrin Valley Conference
- Mascot: Trojans
- Accreditation: North Central Association of Colleges and Schools
- Website: https://www.ths.org/

Trinity High School is a private coeducational Roman Catholic college preparatory High School, located in Garfield Heights, Ohio, United States. It is located in the Roman Catholic Diocese of Cleveland. It was started in 1926 by the Sisters of St. Joseph of the Third Order of St. Francis.

Trinity has a 26-acre (110,000 m^{2}) campus that includes the main school building and no athletic fields. The school is accredited by the North Central Association of Colleges and Schools, the Ohio Department of Education, and the Ohio Catholic School Accrediting Association.

== History ==
On August 15, 1926, Archbishop Joseph Schrembs dedicated the new Saint Joseph Academy. It was an all-girls school located in the Marymount Convent in Garfield Heights, and opened with eight students. In 1932 enrollment had increased considerably, and the school was accepted into the North Central Association of Colleges and Schools.

In 1939, the school's name was changed to Marymount High School to avoid confusion with Saint Joseph Academy in Cleveland. In 1954, an increasing enrollment led the need for a new high school building, located just to the east of the convent. On September 5, 1957, 470 girls began classes at the new Marymount High School facility, which today serves as the main building of the Trinity campus. At the same time the Vincentian Sisters of Charity opened Lumen Cordium High School in Bedford, attracting nearby students who might otherwise have enrolled at Marymount. Marymount's enrollment began to decline.

In 1973, the all-girl Marymount High School closed and re-opened as coeducational Trinity High School. The school enrolled 335 girls and 46 boys. Two years later the Byzantine Catholic High School in Parma closed, and a number of students transferred to Trinity.

== Academics ==
The students study a college-prep curriculum including Advanced Placement coursework in subjects such as English, Calculus, History, Spanish, Government and Art. Ninety-five percent of graduating seniors go onto colleges. The school has a Pre-Professional Internship Program helps students to decide on a major. Many of the internships focus on medicine, graphic design, and information technology.

There is an emphasis on educational technology. Students have the opportunity to learn web page design, multimedia, high-end graphic design, and video production as part of the curriculum. Trinity's 26-acre (110,000 m^{2}) campus includes the main school building and several athletic fields.

== Athletics ==
Trinity competes in the Ohio High School Athletic Association. Trinity has competed in the Chagrin Valley Conference since 2019. Trinity previously was a member of the North Coast League from 1984 to 2019.

=== State championships ===
Ohio High School Athletic Association Championships:

- Girls basketball – 1990, 1994, 1996
- Football – 1980
- Boys track and field - 2009

OASSA Championship:

- Cheerleading - 2013

== Activities ==
- Academic clubs: Environmental Club, National Honor Society, Saint Anthony Society, Spanish Club
- Athletic clubs: Danceline/Drill Team, Indoor Track, Wrestling Stats
- Athletic teams: Baseball, Basketball, Boys golf, Boys soccer, Cheerleading, Cross country, Football, Girls soccer, Softball, Track, Volleyball, Wrestling
- Fine Arts clubs: Art Club, Band, Choir, Drama, Music Ministers, THS News Crew, Yearbook
- Leadership clubs: Ambassador Club, Class Officers, Instruments of Peace, SALT

== Notable alumni ==
- Justin Bibb - 58th Mayor of Cleveland
- Semeka Randall - professional basketball player and coach
- Jerry Schuplinski - NFL football coach
- Vonda Ward - professional boxer
- Tom Zakrajsek - professional ice skater
