= Richard Quinn (American football) =

American football player (born 1986)

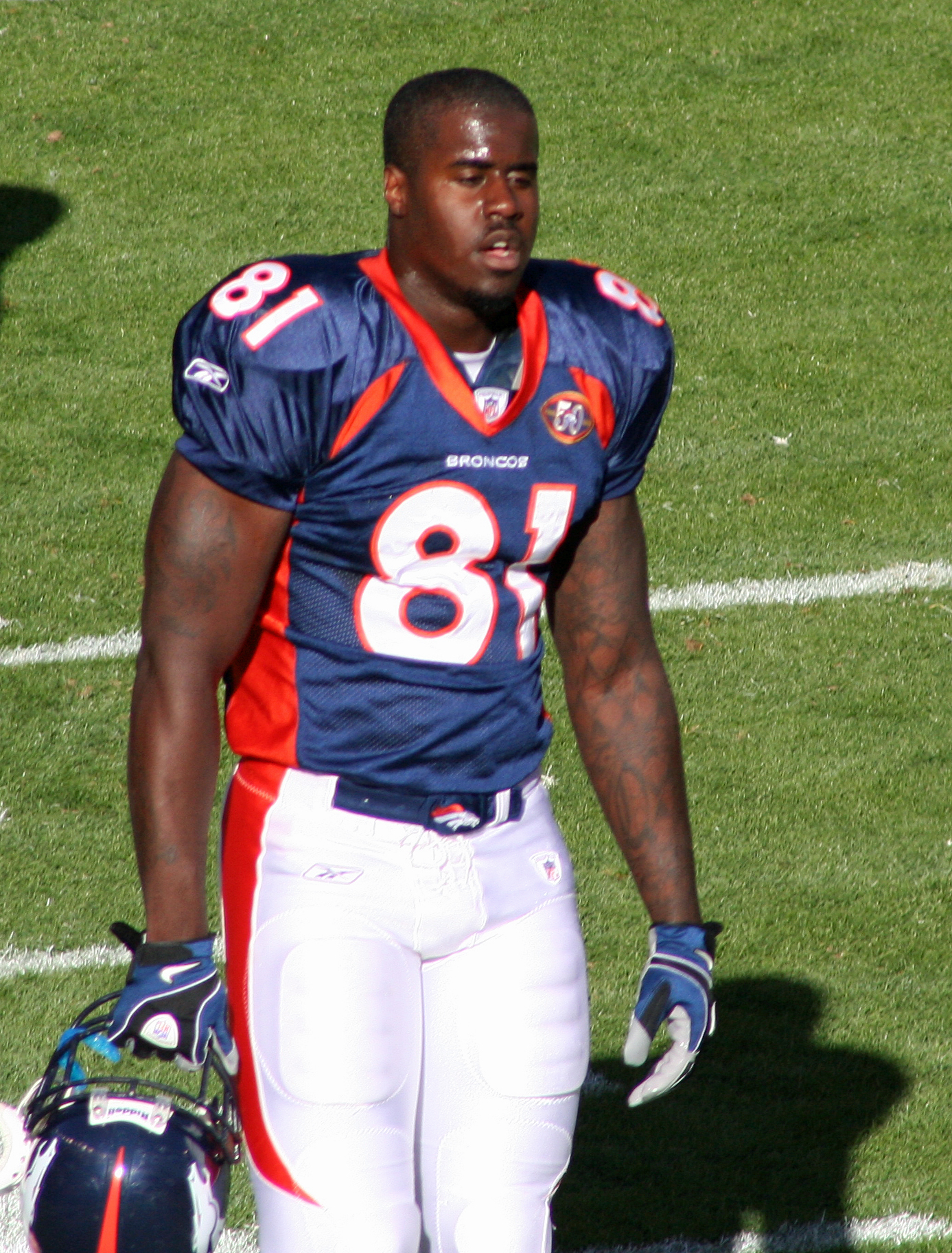
- Quinn with the Denver Broncos in 2009

No. 81, 80, 89
- Position: Tight end

Personal information
- Born: September 6, 1986 (age 40); Maple Heights, Ohio, U.S.
- Listed height: 6 ft 4 in (1.93 m)
- Listed weight: 264 lb (120 kg)

Career information
- High school: Maple Heights
- College: North Carolina
- NFL draft: 2009: 2nd round, 64th overall pick

Career history
- Denver Broncos (2009−2010); Washington Redskins (2011); Cincinnati Bengals (2012); Arizona Cardinals (2013)*; Washington Redskins (2014)*; New Orleans Saints (2014)*
- * Offseason or practice squad member only

Career NFL statistics
- Receptions: 1
- Receiving yards: 9
- Stats at Pro Football Reference

Richard Emanuel Quinn, Jr. (born September 6, 1986) is an American former professional football player who was a tight end in the National Football League (NFL). He played college football for the North Carolina Tar Heels and was selected by the Denver Broncos in the second round of the 2009 NFL draft.

== Professional career ==
=== Denver Broncos ===
Quinn was selected by the Denver Broncos in the second round (64th overall) of the 2009 NFL draft. On July 23, 2009, Quinn signed a four-year contract with injury protection guarantee. His first reception was in week 15 of the 2010 NFL season from rookie quarterback Tim Tebow in a 39-23 loss against the Oakland Raiders. Quinn was waived/injured on August 22, 2011, and after clearing waivers, was placed on injured reserve on August 23. He was released with an injury settlement on August 26. He ended his Bronco career with 1 reception for 9 yards.

=== Washington Redskins (first stint) ===
On December 13, 2011, Richard Quinn was signed to the Washington Redskins' 53-man active roster. Quinn played only one game with the Redskins in Week 15 against the New York Giants of the 2011 season.

He was released by the Redskins on August 31, 2012 for final cuts before the start of the 2012 season.

=== Cincinnati Bengals ===
On September 4, 2012, Quinn signed with the Cincinnati Bengals. On March 23, 2013, Quinn was re-signed by the Cincinnati Bengals. On August 25, 2013, he was released by the Bengals.

=== Arizona Cardinals ===
Quinn signed with the Arizona Cardinals in August 2013 and was released on August 30, 2013.

=== Washington Redskins (second stint) ===
Quinn signed a reserve/future contract with the Redskins on December 31, 2013. He was released on March 4, 2014.

=== New Orleans Saints ===
Quinn was signed by the New Orleans Saints in August 2014 but retired only 6 days after his signing on August 11, 2014.
