= St. Joseph Convent and Academy Complex =

Historic church in Ohio, United States

- U.S. National Register of Historic Places
- U.S. Historic district
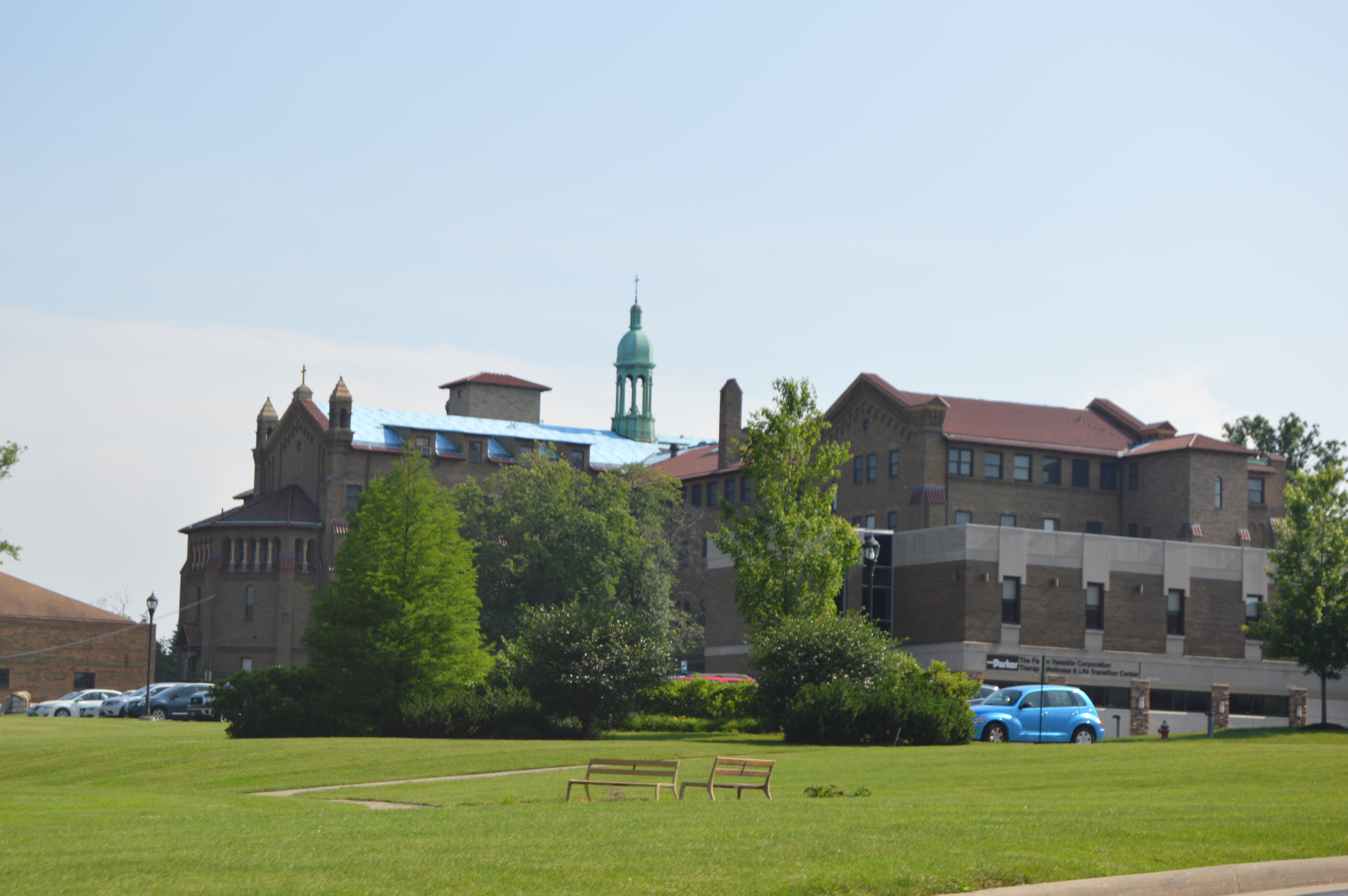
- Overview from the north

- Location within Ohio Location within the United States
- Location: 12215 Granger Rd., Garfield Heights, Ohio
- Coordinates: 41°25′13″N 81°35′52″W
- Area: 26 acres (11 ha)
- Built: 1924
- Architect: Warner, Franz C.,
- Architectural style: Mission/Spanish Revival
- NRHP reference No.: 06000272
- Added to NRHP: April 12, 2006

St. Joseph Convent and Academy Complex (also known as Sisters of St. Joseph of the Third Order of St. Francis, Marymount) is a historic church at 12215 Granger Road in Garfield Heights, Ohio.

It was built in 1924 and added to the National Register in 2006.
