= Garfield Heights High School =

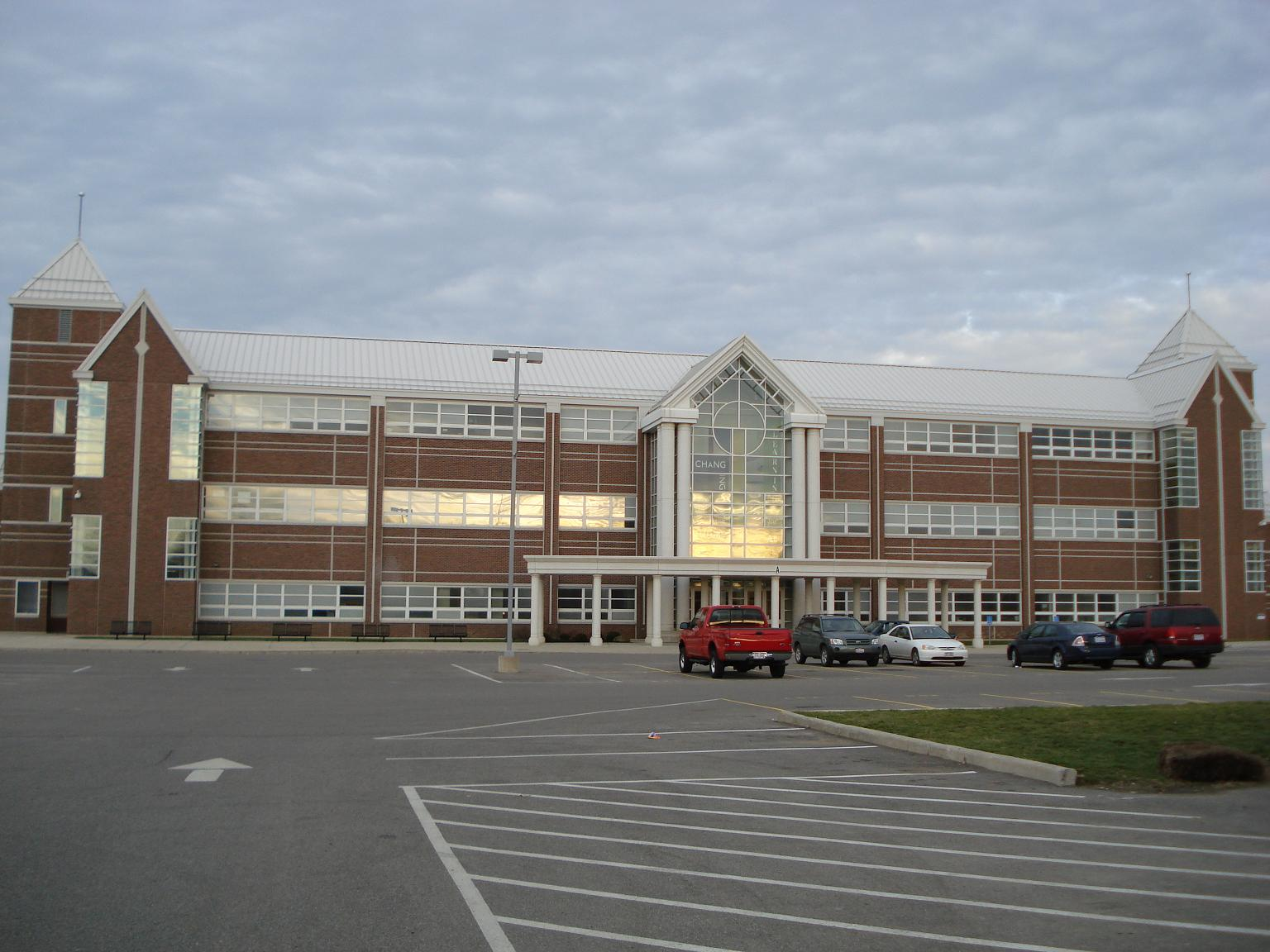
- Garfield Heights High School in 2006

Location
- 4900 Turney Road; Garfield Heights, (Cuyahoga County), Ohio 44125; United States
- Coordinates: 41°25′39″N 81°36′54″W

Information
- Type: Public, Coeducational high school
- Motto: Go Bulldogs
- School district: Garfield Heights City School District
- Superintendent: Richard Reynolds
- Principal: John Townsend
- Grades: 9-12
  - Grade 9: 334
  - Grade 10: 243
  - Grade 11: 266
  - Grade 12: 241
- Colors: Blue and gold
- Slogan: Once A Bulldog Always A Bulldog
- Athletics conference: United Athletic Conference
- Mascot: Bulldog
- Nickname: Dawgs
- Team name: Bulldogs
- Rival: Maple Hts
- Accreditation: North Central Association of Colleges and Schools
- Newspaper: The Mirror
- Website: https://www.garfieldheightscityschools.com/o/hs

Garfield Heights High School is a public high school located in Garfield Heights, Ohio, United States, about 10 miles southeast of downtown Cleveland. It is part of the Garfield Heights City School District. The school today currently enrolls approximately 1,300 students. The school's mascot is the Bulldog, and the school's main colors are navy blue and gold.

== Athletics ==
The school's athletic teams are known as the Bulldogs. They are currently in the United Athletic Conference as of 2026, beginning with 2015-16. They were previously members of the Northeast Ohio Conference from 2007 to 2015, with the exception of the ice hockey team, which belongs to the Greater Cleveland High School Hockey League Blue Division. The school fields athletic teams in football, track & field, wrestling, baseball, soccer, tennis, golf, basketball, softball, and hockey. The Ohio High School Athletic Association approved bowling as a sanctioned sport starting in the 2006-2007 school year.

=== State championships ===
- Boys wrestling - 1960, 1994

== Clubs ==
The school also contains several student associations/clubs. The Students of Service program provides community service throughout the community and school. Other programs include Drama Club, Art Club, Book Club, Tech Crew, and Computer Club.

== Notable alumni ==
- Meechie Johnson - college basketball player
- Trey Lewis - professional basketball player
- Carl Monday - television news reporter
- Phil Pozderac - former NFL player
- Wilma Smith - television news anchor
