= Maple Heights High School =

Location
- 1 Mustang Way; Maple Heights, (Cuyahoga County), Ohio 44137; United States
- Coordinates: 41°24′45″N 81°33′40″W

Information
- Type: Public, Coeducational high school
- Superintendent: Charles Keenan
- Principal: Shay Price
- Teaching staff: 58.00 (FTE)
- Grades: 9–12
- Student to teacher ratio: 17.53
- Colors: Maroon and White
- Athletics conference: United Athletic Conference
- Team name: Mustangs
- Rival: Bedford, Cleveland Heights
- Accreditation: North Central Association of Colleges and Schools
- Website: www.mapleschools.com/o/mhhs

Maple Heights High School is a public high school located in Maple Heights, Ohio, southeast of Cleveland, Ohio. It graduated its first class in 1925.

A completely new high school building opened in 2013, replacing one that dated back 90 years. A new stadium with artificial turf and an all-weather track opened in 2014.

== Athletics ==
=== State championships ===
- Boys wrestling – 1956, 1957, 1962, 1963, 1966, 1967, 1968, 1969, 1971, 1974
- Football – 2010

== Notable alumni ==
- Chuck Findley – Class of 1965. trumpet player in The Tonight Show Band, Steely Dan and The Wrecking Crew.
- Bruce E. Grooms – retired vice admiral in the United States Navy.
- Len Kosmalski, NBA basketball player (Kansas City Kings)
- Jim Krusoe, novelist, poet, and short story writer.
- Frank Mestnik (born 1938), class of 1953, professional football player (St. Louis Cardinals and Green Bay Packers).
- Dale Mohorcic, class of 1974, professional baseball player
- Ric Ocasek (1944–2019), class of 1963, lead singer of the Cars.
- Mary Oliver – Pulitzer Prize and American Book Award winning poet.
- Richard Quinn (born 1986), professional football player (Denver Broncos and Washington Redskins).
- Evelyn Svec Ward (1921–1989), class of 1939, fiber artist.
