= Bedford High School (Ohio) =

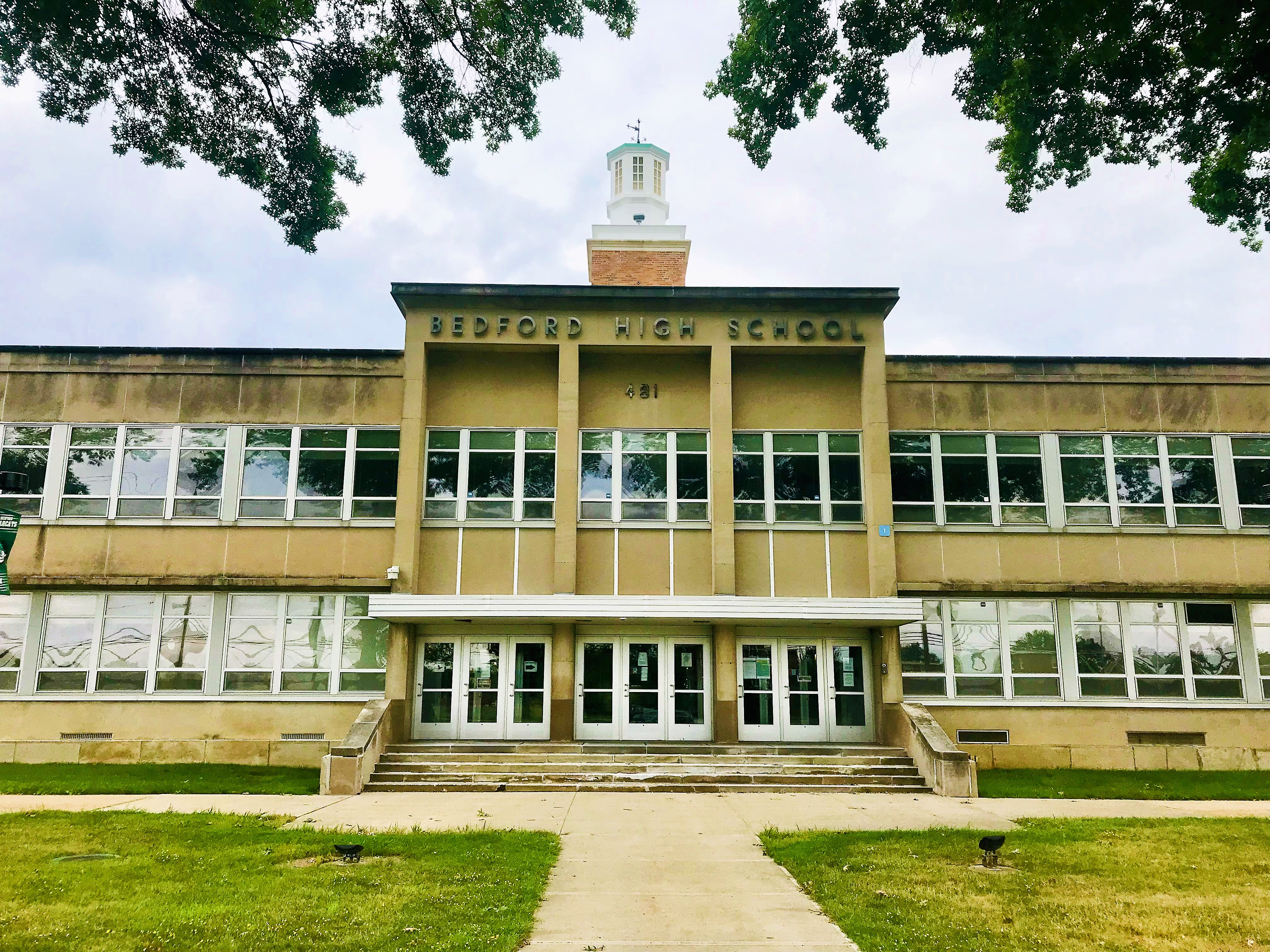

Location
- 481 Northfield Road; Bedford, Ohio 44146; United States
- 41.4024°N 81.5253°W

Information
- Type: Public, coeducational
- Established: 1954
- School district: Bedford City School District
- Principal: Khalisha Lewis
- Teaching staff: 71.99 (FTE)
- Grades: 9–12
- Student to teacher ratio: 12.22
- Colors: Green and white
- Athletics conference: United Athletic Conference
- Sports: Football, Baseball, Soccer, Softball, Volleyball, Wrestling, Swimming, Cross Country, and Track and Field.
- Mascot: Scotty The Bearcat
- Team name: Bearcats
- Accreditation: Ohio Department of Education
- Website: Bedford High School

Bedford High School is a public school in Bedford, Ohio, southeast of Cleveland. Athletic teams are known as the Bearcats and they compete in the Ohio High School Athletic Association in the United Athletic Conference.

== Background ==
Bedford High School was built in 1954, with additions in 1971, and 1994. Bedford High School is accredited by the Ohio Department of Education.

Bedford High School was neighbors with St. Peter Chanel High School until Chanel High School was demolished in July 2020. With both schools winning championships in sports, The city of Bedford renamed a portion of Northfield Road the "Avenue of Champions". Both schools were under construction at the same time in the 1950s.

Bedford High School was erected in 1955–57, it is built in Norman Brick-style architecture with limestone and cost $2.1 million. The Bedford Board of Education Building at 475 Northfield Road was built on the campus in 1961 and two wings were added to the high school in 1971. They are connected to the rest of the building by two glass-enclosed walkways. The school's current football facility, Bearcat Stadium, opened in 1994.

== Notable alumni ==
- Halle Berry, actress (class of 1984)
- Eric Beverly, professional football player in the National Football League (NFL) (class of 1992)
- Chris Chambers, NFL player (class of 1997)
- George Alec Effinger, a science fiction writer (class of 1965)
- Lee Evans, professional football player in the NFL (class of 1999)
- Elmer Flick, Major League Baseball player and 1963 inductee into the National Baseball Hall of Fame
- Tyvis Powell, professional football player in the NFL
- Toby Radloff, a minor celebrity owing to his appearances in Cleveland writer Harvey Pekar's autobiographical comic book American Splendor
- Jim Rittwage, professional baseball player in MLB
- Rodger Saffold, professional football player in the NFL, and CEO of Esports organization Rise Nation (c/o 2006)
- Mary Ellen Weber, NASA astronaut (class of 1980)

== State championships ==
- Track and Field - 1993
- Wrestling – 1955
