= Helen Steiner Rice =

American poet

- Born: Helen Steiner; May 19, 1900; Lorain, Ohio
- Died: April 23, 1981 (aged 80); Lorain, Ohio
- Occupations: Businesswoman, poet
- Writing career
- Genre: Christian poetry

Helen Steiner Rice (May 19, 1900 – April 23, 1981) was an American writer of both inspirational and Christian poetry.

== Biography ==
Helen Steiner was born in Lorain, Ohio on May 19, 1900. While still in high school Helen planned to attend college. However, after her father, a railroad worker, died in the influenza epidemic of 1918, the same year she graduated from Lorain High School, she had to change plans. After graduation, she began work for the Lorain Electric Light and Power Company and progressed to the position of advertising manager, which was rare for a woman at that time. She also became the Ohio State Chairwoman of the Women's Public Information Committee of the Electric Light Association, and campaigned for women's rights and improved working conditions. Eventually she opened her own speaking engagement business where she continued to promote her business advise as advocating for women in the workplace.

In 1929, she married Franklin Dryden Rice, a bank vice-president in Dayton, Ohio. After the stock market crash in October that year, Franklin lost his job and his investments. He fell into a depression from which he never recovered and committed suicide in 1932.

Rice re-entered the workforce in 1931 to support her husband and herself when she accepted a position at the Gibson Art Company in Cincinnati, Ohio. Rice's lifelong passion for writing poetry flourished, and she continued to work at Gibson's after her husband's death. Her poems received wide exposure in the 1960s when several were read by Aladdin on the poetry segment of the Lawrence Welk television show.

She has been described the "poet laureate of the greeting‐card world". Steiner Rice's books of poetry have sold millions of copies.

She died on the evening of April 23, 1981, at age 80, and was buried in Elmwood Cemetery in Lorain, Ohio. After her death, New York Times described her as, "...the largest-selling author of religious poetry, with sales of her books regularly surpassing 100,000 copies."

Pope John Paul II, President Jimmy Carter and his wife Rosalynn were admirers of her artistry.

== Legacy ==
She posthumously received the International Greeting Card Award in 1990 at the Second Annual International Greeting Card Awards ("the Louie) for her decades of work at Gibson Greetings.

Rice was inducted into the Ohio Women's Hall of Fame in 1992 for her contributions to the arts, music, and journalism.

By the 1980s, academic commentary about her writing style acknowledged her popularity within the eyes of the general public, but poetry critics commonly did not take her seriously. The public demand for her poetry books continued into at least the late 1990s.

== Bibliography ==
This is a list of books by Helen Steiner Rice published during her lifetime. Many other volumes of her works have been published after her death.

- A time for rejoicing. Cincinnati: Gibson Greeting Cards, 1964.
- A Christmas gift of love. Cincinnati: Gibson Greeting Cards, 1964.
- Mother is a Word Called Love. Cincinnati: Gibson Greeting Cards, 1964.
- Climb 'til your dream comes true. Cincinnati: Gibson Greeting Cards, 1964.
- Tidings of joy for your Christmas. Cincinnati: Gibson Greeting Cards, 1965.
- Let not your heart be troubled. Old Tappan, N.J., Fleming H. Revell, 1965.
- On life's busy thoroughfare. Cincinnati: Gibson Greeting Cards, 1966.
- Just for you: a collection of inspirational verses. Garden City, N.Y., Doubleday, 1967.
- Prayers and meditations for your Christmas. Cincinnati: Gibson Greeting Cards, 1967.
- A gift of love; poems from the heart of Helen Steiner Rice. Old Tappan, N.J.: Fleming H. Revell, 1968.
- Heart Gifts from Helen Steiner Rice; A Special Selection of Her Poems and a Pen Portrait of Her As a Person. Old Tappan, N.J.: Fleming H. Revell, 1968.
- Sunshine of joy. Old Tappan, N.J.: Fleming H. Revell, 1968.
- Lovingly: poems for all seasons. Old Tappan, N.J.: Fleming H. Revell, 1970.
- If there had never been a Christmas. Cincinnati: Gibson Greeting Cards, 1971.
- Prayerfully. Old Tappan, N.J., Fleming H. Revell, 1971.
- Yesterday, today, and tomorrow. Cincinnati: Gibson Greeting Cards, 1971.
- Someone cares; the collected poems of Helen Steiner Rice. Old Tappan, N.J., Fleming H. Revell, 1972.
- Story of the Christmas guest, as retold by Helen Steiner Rice. Old Tappan, N.J., Fleming H. Revell, 1972.
- Life is forever. Old Tappan, N.J., Fleming H. Revell, 1974.
- Somebody loves you. Old Tappan, N.J., Fleming H. Revell, 1976.
- Everyone needs someone : poems of love and friendship. Old Tappan, N.J., Fleming H. Revell, 1978.
- In the vineyard of the Lord / Helen Steiner Rice, as told to Fred Bauer. Old Tappan, N.J., Fleming H. Revell, 1979.
- And the greatest of these is love : poems and promises / Helen Steiner Rice; compiled by Donald T. Kauffman. Old Tappan, N.J., Fleming H. Revell, 1980.
- Mothers are a gift of love. Old Tappan, N.J., Fleming H. Revell, 1980.
- Gifts from the heart. Old Tappan, N.J., Fleming H. Revell, 1981.
