= Garfield Heights, Ohio =

- City
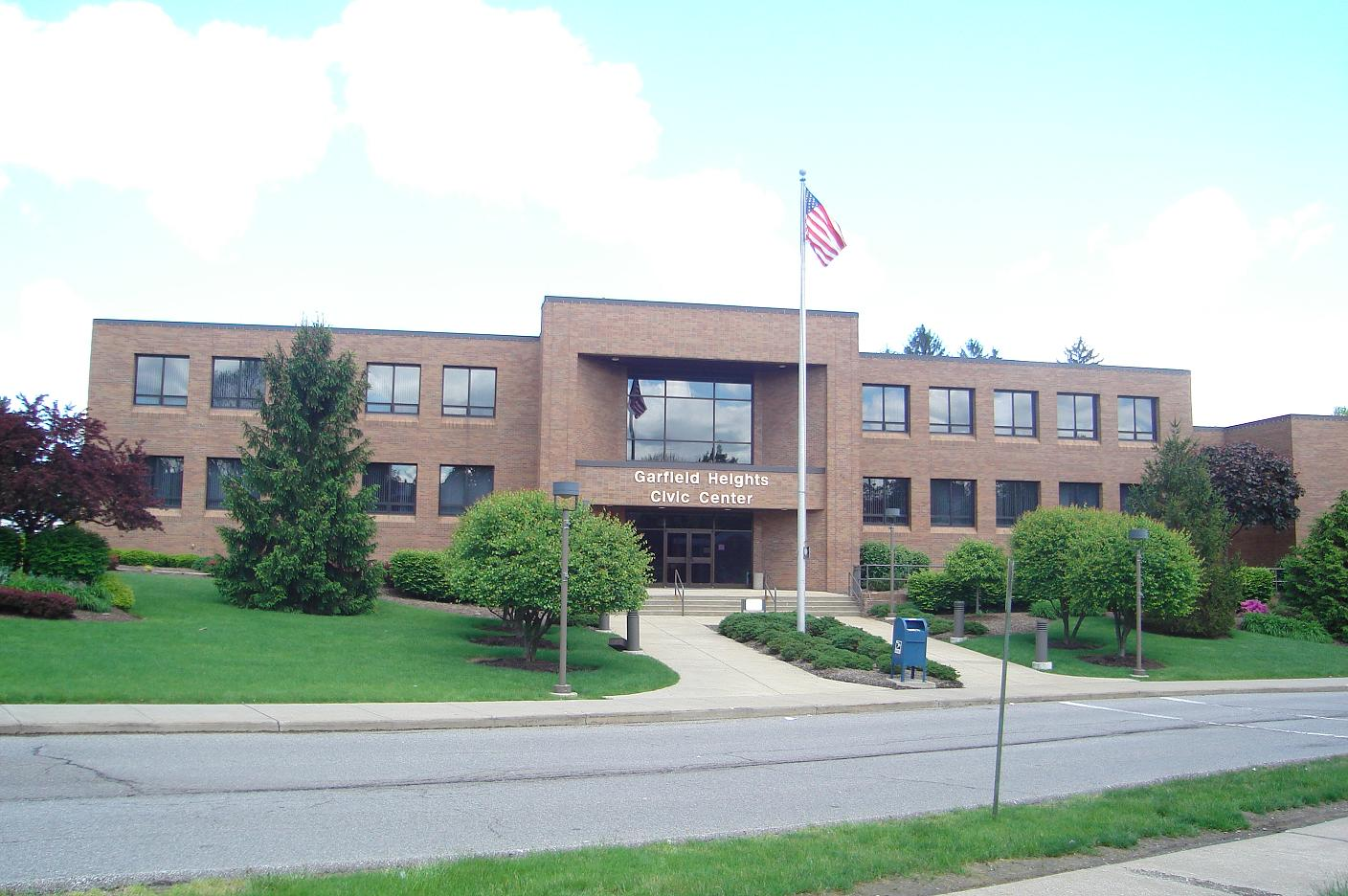
- Garfield Heights Civic Center

- Seal Logo
- Interactive map of Garfield Heights, Ohio
- Location within Ohio Location within the United States
- Coordinates: 41°25′17″N 81°36′10″W
- Country: United States
- State: Ohio
- County: Cuyahoga
- Settled: 1786
- Founded: 1907
- Incorporated: 1930

Government
  - Type: Mayor–council
  - Mayor: Matt Burke (D)

Area
  - Total: 7.29 sq mi (18.87 km^{2})
  - Land: 7.23 sq mi (18.72 km^{2})
  - Water: 0.054 sq mi (0.14 km^{2})
- Elevation: 955 ft (291 m)

Population (2020)
  - Total: 29,781
  - Estimate (2023): 28,900
  - Density: 4,119.4/sq mi (1,590.49/km^{2})
- Time zone: UTC-5 (Eastern (EST))
  - Summer (DST): UTC-4 (EDT)
- ZIP codes: 44105, 44125, 44128
- Area code: 216
- FIPS code: 39-29428
- GNIS feature ID: 1064703
- Website: garfieldhts.org

Garfield Heights is a city in Cuyahoga County, Ohio, United States. The population was 29,781 at the time of the 2020 census. A suburb of Cleveland, it is a part of the Cleveland metropolitan area.

== History ==
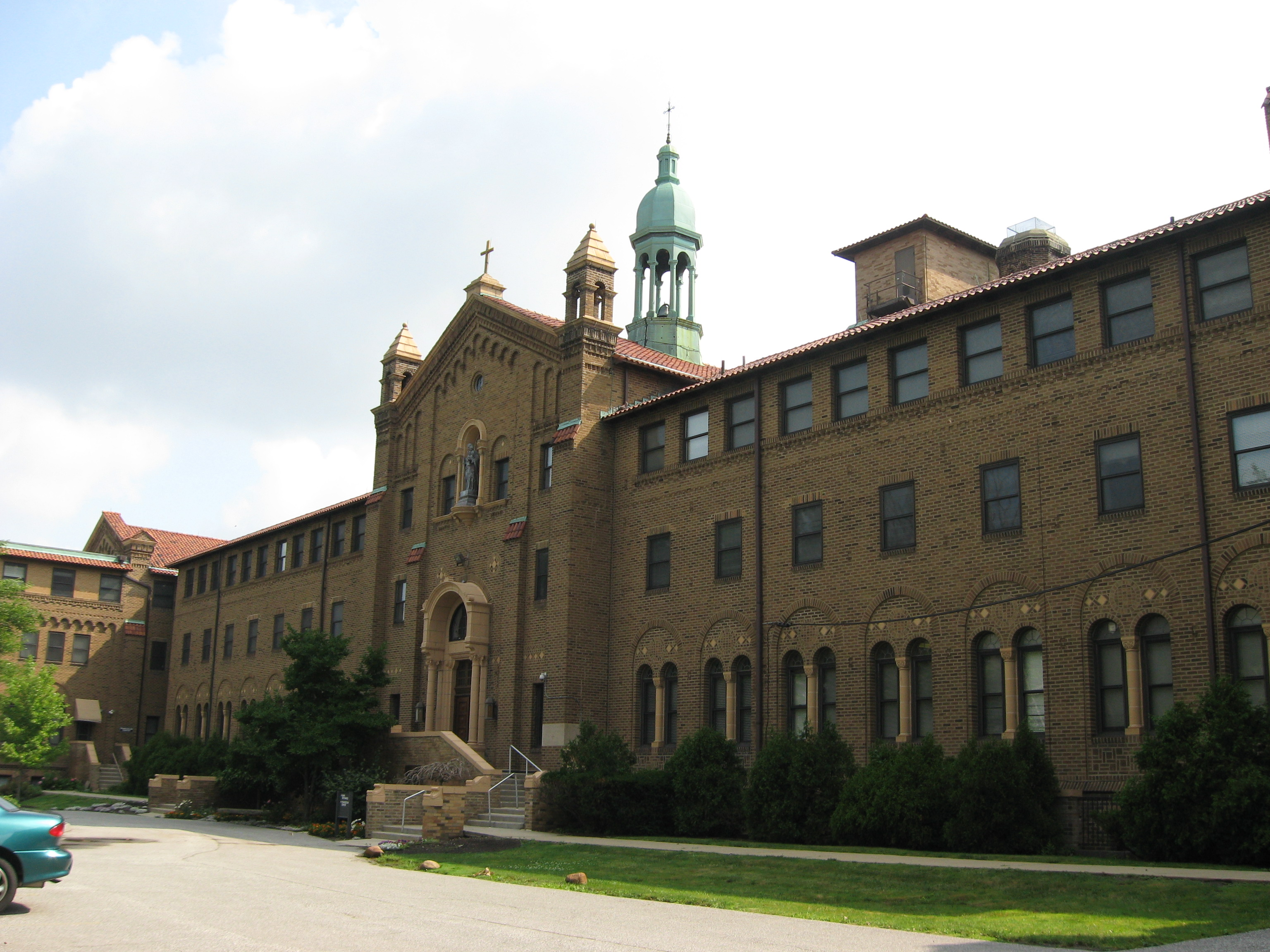
Marymount Congregational Home, St. Joseph Convent and Academy Complex

The area was originally part of Newburgh Township. The Village of South Newburgh was formed in 1907, changed its name to Garfield Hts Village in 1919 and it was incorporated as Garfield Heights in 1930 when the cities population hit 5000. The city is named after Garfield Park, which in turn was named in honor of President James A. Garfield, a native of nearby Orange Township.

== Geography ==
Garfield Heights is located at 41°25′17″N 81°36′10″W (41.421423, -81.602682).

According to the United States Census Bureau, the city has a total area of 7.29 square miles (18.88 km^{2}), of which 7.23 square miles (18.73 km^{2}) is land and 0.06 square miles (0.16 km^{2}) is water. The elevation of Garfield Heights is 831 feet (253 m) above sea level where it borders Cleveland, and its highest elevation is 972 feet (296 m) above sea level at the Garfield Heights Justice Center.

== Demographics ==
Historical population
Census	Pop.	Note	%±
1920	2,530		—
1930	15,589		516.2%
1940	16,989		9.0%
1950	21,662		27.5%
1960	38,455		77.5%
1970	41,417		7.7%
1980	34,938		−15.6%
1990	31,739		−9.2%
2000	30,734		−3.2%
2010	28,849		−6.1%
2020	29,781		3.2%
2025 (est.)	28,790		−3.3%

The ethnic groups of Garfield Heights include Poles, Slovenes, Germans, Italians, Irish, and African-Americans.

93.4% spoke English, 2.8% Polish, 1.2% Italian, and 1.2% Spanish.

=== Racial and ethnic composition ===
Garfield Heights city, Ohio – Racial and ethnic composition Note: the US Census treats Hispanic/Latino as an ethnic category. This table excludes Latinos from the racial categories and assigns them to a separate category. Hispanics/Latinos may be of any race.
Race / Ethnicity (NH = Non-Hispanic)	Pop 2000	Pop 2010	Pop 2020	% 2000	% 2010	% 2020
White alone (NH)	24,577	17,019	10,502	79.97%	58.99%	35.26%
Black or African American alone (NH)	5,143	10,184	16,618	16.73%	35.30%	55.80%
Native American or Alaska Native alone (NH)	44	35	37	0.14%	0.12%	0.12%
Asian alone (NH)	286	387	266	0.93%	1.34%	0.89%
Native Hawaiian or Pacific Islander alone (NH)	3	6	3	0.01%	0.02%	0.01%
Other race alone (NH)	33	34	88	0.11%	0.12%	0.30%
Mixed race or Multiracial (NH)	260	528	1,097	0.85%	1.83%	3.68%
Hispanic or Latino (any race)	388	656	1,170	1.26%	2.27%	3.93%
Total	30,734	28,849	29,781	100.00%	100.00%	100.00%

=== 2020 census ===
As of the 2020 census, Garfield Heights had a population of 29,781. The median age was 38.7 years. 23.9% of residents were under the age of 18 and 17.4% of residents were 65 years of age or older. For every 100 females there were 83.6 males, and for every 100 females age 18 and over there were 79.7 males age 18 and over.

100.0% of residents lived in urban areas, while 0.0% lived in rural areas.

There were 11,985 households in Garfield Heights, of which 30.3% had children under the age of 18 living in them. Of all households, 28.1% were married-couple households, 20.9% were households with a male householder and no spouse or partner present, and 43.1% were households with a female householder and no spouse or partner present. About 32.6% of all households were made up of individuals and 13.9% had someone living alone who was 65 years of age or older.

There were 13,179 housing units, of which 9.1% were vacant. The homeowner vacancy rate was 2.3% and the rental vacancy rate was 8.0%.

Racial composition as of the 2020 census
Race	Number	Percent
White	10,721	36.0%
Black or African American	16,817	56.5%
American Indian and Alaska Native	43	0.1%
Asian	269	0.9%
Native Hawaiian and Other Pacific Islander	6	0.0%
Some other race	467	1.6%
Two or more races	1,458	4.9%
Hispanic or Latino (of any race)	1,170	3.9%

=== 2010 census ===
As of the 2010 census, there were 28,849 people, 11,691 households, and 7,393 families residing in the city. The population density was 3,990.2 inhabitants per square mile (1,540.6/km^{2}). There were 13,125 housing units at an average density of 1,815.4 per square mile (700.9/km^{2}). The racial makeup of the city was 60.2% White, 35.7% African American, 0.2% Native American, 1.3% Asian, 0.6% from other races, and 2.1% from two or more races. Hispanic or Latino of any race were 2.3% of the population.

There were 11,691 households, of which 32.8% had children under the age of 18 living with them, 36.5% were married couples living together, 21.3% had a female householder with no husband present, 5.4% had a male householder with no wife present, and 36.8% were non-families. 31.8% of all households were made up of individuals, and 13.5% had someone living alone who was 65 years of age or older. The average household size was 2.43 and the average family size was 3.08.

The median age in the city was 38.5 years. 25% of residents were under the age of 18; 8.4% were between the ages of 18 and 24; 25.1% were from 25 to 44; 26% were from 45 to 64; and 15.4% were 65 years of age or older. The gender makeup of the city was 46.0% male and 54.0% female.

== Economy ==
Garfield Heights is the site of Highland Park (formerly City View Center) which once was a planned regional power center built upon a former landfill in the mid-2000s. In 2020, the development was purchased from receivership and revitalized by Industrial Commercial Properties, Inc. In 2021, Mayor Matt Burke along with former Mayors Vic Collova and Thomas J. Longo, stood with Industrial Commercial Properties to cut the ribbon for the first new corporations to open in Highland Park including MPAC Switchback, MTech, Innoplast, and Thermoprene.

== Government ==
Garfield Heights has seven wards and a mayor-council form of government. The city's charter went into effect in 1956. The city also has a municipal court that serves several jurisdictions. The council president is selected by members of city council. If the mayor's seat is vacated, the council president would assume the duties, according to the city charter.

== Parks and recreation ==
The Dan Kostel Recreation Center is located on Turney Road at the Civic Center complex and includes an outdoor swimming pool open during summer season only and an indoor ice skating rink. Garfield Park Reservation, part of the regional Cleveland Metroparks system, is located in the Northeast corner of Garfield Heights on its border with Cleveland.

Wargo Farms, a 45-acre area of land was sold to the Cleveland Metroparks in 2023 to preserve green space and create walking trails and recreation.

== Education ==
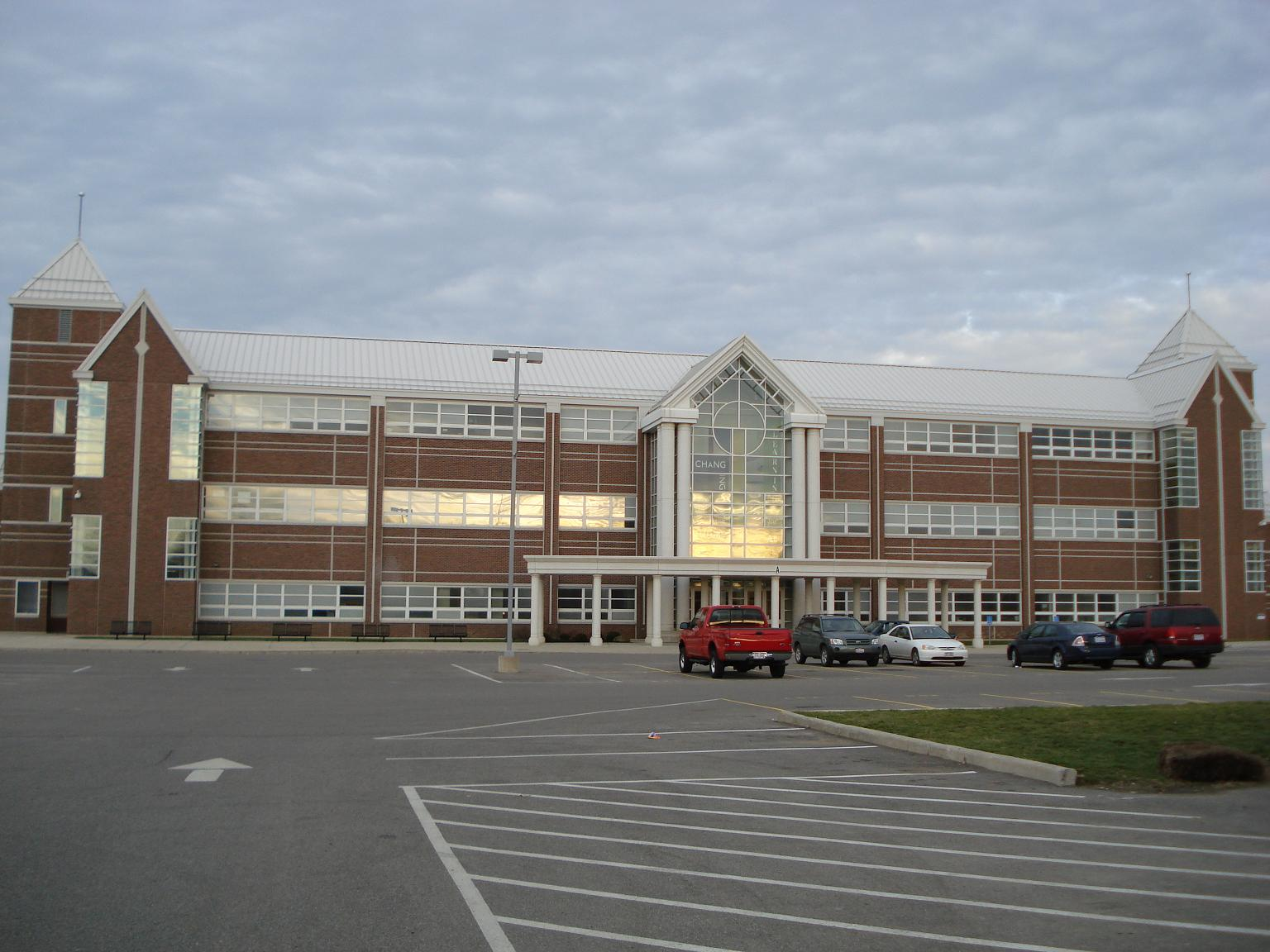
Garfield Heights High School

Garfield Heights has its own public school system comprising three elementary schools, one middle school, and one high school. It is governed by a five-member elected board. There are two Catholic schools in the city; St. Benedict and Trinity High School.

== Media ==
Garfield Heights is served by the Cleveland television stations and numerous cable and satellite providers. The Cleveland Plain Dealer, and the Neighborhood News-Garfield Heights Tribune (published each Wednesday) are the main newspapers.

== Notable people ==
- Steve Bartek, American guitarist, film composer, conductor
- James Jude Courtney, American actor and stunt performer
- William A. Foster, earned the Medal of Honor
- Dennis Fryzel, last football coach at the University of Tampa
- DeJuan Groce, cornerback in the NFL
- Dale Miller, former Ohio State Senator
- Gene Mruczkowski, former NFL offensive lineman and Super Bowl champ with the New England Patriots
- Scott Mruczkowski, former football center for the San Diego Chargers
- Phil Pozderac, former NFL offensive lineman and Super Bowl champ with the Dallas Cowboys
- Jerry Schuplinski, former NFL QB and quality control coach for New England Patriots, Miami Dolphins and New York Giants
- David J. Skal, American cultural historian, critic, writer
- Wilma Smith, former Cleveland news anchor
- James Glenwright Unger, American hockey player
