= Maple Heights, Ohio =

City in Ohio, United States

- City
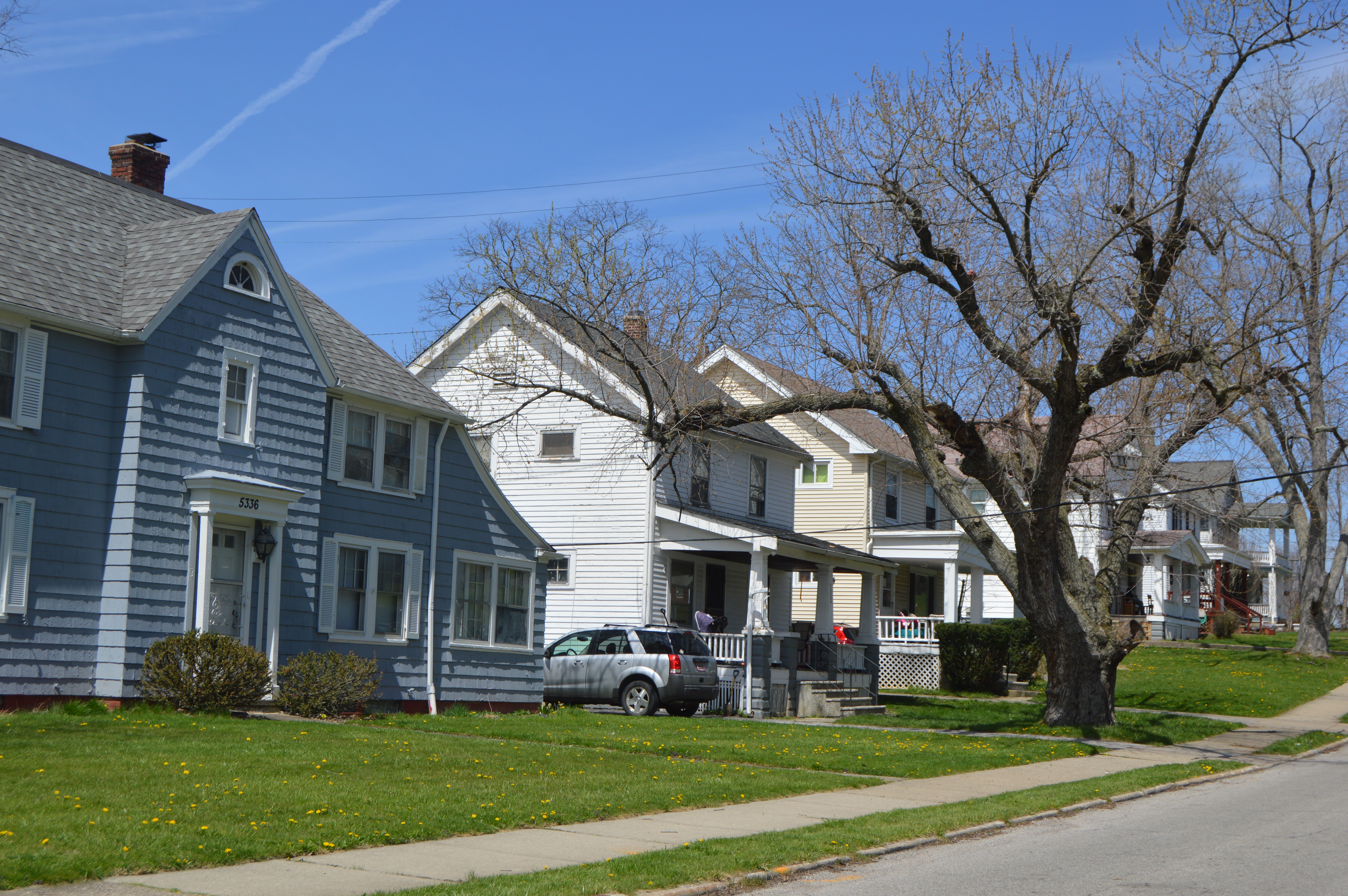
- Residential neighborhood along Vine Street

- Flag Seal
- Interactive map of Maple Heights, Ohio
- Location within Ohio Location within the United States
- Coordinates: 41°24′44″N 81°33′35″W
- Country: United States
- State: Ohio
- County: Cuyahoga
- Incorporated: 1915

Government
  - Type: Mayor-Council
  - Mayor: Annette M. Blackwell (D)

Area
  - Total: 5.17 sq mi (13.39 km^{2})
  - Land: 5.17 sq mi (13.39 km^{2})
  - Water: 0 sq mi (0.00 km^{2})
- Elevation: 896 ft (273 m)

Population (2020)
  - Total: 23,701
  - Density: 4,585/sq mi (1,770.3/km^{2})
- Time zone: UTC-5 (Eastern (EST))
  - Summer (DST): UTC-4 (EDT)
- ZIP code: 44137
- Area code: 216
- FIPS code: 39-47306
- GNIS feature ID: 1048945
- Website: https://www.citymapleheights.com/

Maple Heights is a city in Cuyahoga County, Ohio, United States. It is a suburb of Cleveland. The population was 23,701 at the 2020 census.

== History ==
In 1935, the city created Maple Heights Transit to provide connections to Downtown Cleveland, crosstown service, and service for schools.

Built as one of the first large shopping centers, Southgate USA was dedicated in 1955, boasting over 80 retail stores, including JCPenney, Sears, and May Company. In 2002, the GCRTA dedicated its Southgate Transit Center, serving as a connection between multiple bus lines between Downtown Cleveland, Bedford, Shaker Heights, East Cleveland, and the Summit County Line.

With deficit fund balances of over $2.8 million and defaults on 3 loan payments, Ohio Auditor of State Dave Yost declared the City to be in fiscal emergency in February 2015. Since February 2015, the City improved its finances and budgeting since with fund balances increasing and the general fund balance becoming positive in 2019—the first time since the fiscal emergency declaration. The City was released from fiscal emergency on November 18, 2020 by the Auditor of State; in the press release, Auditor of State Keith Faber said, "I applaud the leaders of the City for making the sacrifices and hard decisions that should provide residents a fiscally responsible community."

In 2020, Governor Mike DeWine announced that GOJO Industries, makers of Purell, would establish a manufacturing facility in the City in the 325,000 square foot former Blue Coral building on Lee Road South. The Maple Heights facility was projected to bring 100 new jobs to the City.

== Geography ==
According to the United States Census Bureau, the city has a total area of 5.17 square miles (13.39 km^{2}), all land.

== Demographics ==
Historical population
Census	Pop.	Note	%±
1920	1,732		—
1930	5,950		243.5%
1940	6,728		13.1%
1950	15,586		131.7%
1960	31,667		103.2%
1970	34,093		7.7%
1980	29,465		−13.6%
1990	27,089		−8.1%
2000	26,156		−3.4%
2010	23,138		−11.5%
2020	23,701		2.4%

=== Racial and ethnic composition ===
Maple Heights city, Ohio – Racial and ethnic composition Note: the U.S. census treats Hispanic/Latino as an ethnic category. This table excludes Latinos from the racial categories and assigns them to a separate category. Hispanics/Latinos may be of any race.
Race / Ethnicity (NH = Non-Hispanic)	Pop 2000	Pop 2010	Pop 2020	% 2000	% 2010	% 2020
White alone (NH)	13,382	6,373	4,322	51.16%	27.54%	18.24%
Black or African American alone (NH)	11,547	15,682	17,679	44.15%	67.78%	74.59%
Native American or Alaska Native alone (NH)	30	35	48	0.11%	0.15%	0.20%
Asian alone (NH)	451	233	134	1.72%	1.01%	0.57%
Native Hawaiian or Pacific Islander alone (NH)	1	0	5	0.00%	0.00%	0.02%
Other race alone (NH)	41	37	134	0.16%	0.16%	0.57%
Mixed race or Multiracial (NH)	388	421	723	1.48%	1.82%	3.05%
Hispanic or Latino (any race)	316	357	653	1.21%	1.54%	2.76%
Total	26,156	23,138	23,701	100.00%	100.00%	100.00%

=== 2020 census ===
As of the 2020 census, Maple Heights had a population of 23,701. The median age was 39.3 years. 24.2% of residents were under the age of 18 and 15.7% of residents were 65 years of age or older. For every 100 females there were 85.3 males, and for every 100 females age 18 and over there were 79.3 males age 18 and over.

100.0% of residents lived in urban areas, while 0.0% lived in rural areas.

There were 9,841 households in Maple Heights, of which 30.3% had children under the age of 18 living in them. Of all households, 25.9% were married-couple households, 21.8% were households with a male householder and no spouse or partner present, and 45.0% were households with a female householder and no spouse or partner present. About 33.0% of all households were made up of individuals and 12.3% had someone living alone who was 65 years of age or older.

There were 10,781 housing units, of which 8.7% were vacant. The homeowner vacancy rate was 2.6% and the rental vacancy rate was 7.7%.

Racial composition as of the 2020 census
Race	Number	Percent
White	4,397	18.6%
Black or African American	17,854	75.3%
American Indian and Alaska Native	51	0.2%
Asian	145	0.6%
Native Hawaiian and Other Pacific Islander	5	0.0%
Some other race	364	1.5%
Two or more races	885	3.7%
Hispanic or Latino (of any race)	653	2.8%

=== 2010 census ===
As of the census of 2010, there were 23,138 people, 9,515 households, and 6,035 families living in the city. The population density was 4,475.4 inhabitants per square mile (1,728.0/km^{2}). There were 10,894 housing units at an average density of 2,107.2 per square mile (813.6/km^{2}). The racial makeup of the city was 68.2% African American, 28.0% White, 0.2% Native American, 1.0% Asian, 0.5% from other races, and 2.1% from two or more races. Hispanic or Latino of any race were 1.5% of the population.

There were 9,515 households, of which 32.5% had children under the age of 18 living with them, 33.0% were married couples living together, 25.0% had a female householder with no husband present, 5.4% had a male householder with no wife present, and 36.6% were non-families. 32.1% of all households were made up of individuals, and 10.4% had someone living alone who was 65 years of age or older. The average household size was 2.41 and the average family size was 3.05.

The median age in the city was 39.2 years. 25.1% of residents were under the age of 18; 8.3% were between the ages of 18 and 24; 24.5% were from 25 to 44; 28.8% were from 45 to 64; and 13.2% were 65 years of age or older. The gender makeup of the city was 46.3% male and 53.7% female.

=== 2000 census ===
As of the census of 2000, there were 26,156 people, 10,489 households, and 6,964 families living in the city. The population density was 5,039.1 inhabitants per square mile (1,945.6/km^{2}). There were 10,935 housing units at an average density of 2,106.7 per square mile (813.4/km^{2}). The racial makeup of the city was 51.65% White, 44.34% African American, 0.13% Native American, 1.73% Asian, 0.02% Pacific Islander, 0.47% from other races, and 1.66% from two or more races. Hispanic or Latino of any race were 1.21% of the population.

There were 10,489 households, of which 30.9% had children under the age of 18 living with them, 45.2% were married couples living together, 17.0% had a female householder with no husband present, and 33.6% were non-families. 29.9% of all households were made up of individuals, and 12.5% had someone living alone who was 65 years of age or older. The average household size was 2.47 and the average family size was 3.08.

In the city, the population was spread out, with 25.7% under the age of 18, 6.7% from 18 to 24, 30.9% from 25 to 44, 20.1% from 45 to 64, and 16.5% who were 65 years of age or older. The median age was 37 years. For every 100 females, there were 87.8 males. For every 100 females age 18and over, there were 82.7 males.

The median income for a household in the city was $40,414, and the median income for a family was $48,580. Males had a median income of $35,268versus $28,023 for females. The per capita income for the city was $18,676. About 4.7% of families and 5.9% of the population were below the poverty line, including 7.7% of those under age 18 and 6.0% of those age 65 or over.

== Government ==
The City of Maple Heights has a strong-mayor government form and is governed by an elected mayor, elected council president, and elected council.

=== Mayors ===
The City has had 16 people serve as mayor, including current mayor, Annette M. Blackwell, with 2 mayors having served in non-consecutive terms. Between the city's founding and the current administration, there have been a total of 18 mayoral administrations. Mayor Blackwell was elected in 2015 as the first female and first African American mayor in the city's history.

=== City Council ===
The council has seven members, with each member representing a portion of the city, known as a district. The City of Maple Heights has a municipal election on November 2, 2021 with Council President and Councilmembers for Districts 1, 3, 5, and 7 up for election. Before the General Election in 2017, Council President and Councilmembers were elected every two years. Following the approval of Issue 68, Council President and Councilmembers are elected for four year terms with even numbered District Councilmembers elected in 2019 and every four years thereafter and odd numbered District Councilmembers elected in 2017 and every four years thereafter.

Member of the City Council include:

- Ron Jackson, council president
- Leonette F. Cicirella, clerk of council
- Stafford L. Shenett Sr., District 1 councilman
- Toni Jones, District 2 councilwoman
- Timothy Tatum, District 3 councilman
- Dana Anderson, District 4 councilwoman
- Tanglyn Madden, District 5 councilwoman
- Richard Trojanski, District 6 councilman
- Edwina Agee, District 7 councilwoman

== Education ==
=== Public Schools ===
The city's public school system is the Maple Heights City School District. The District is managed by a superintendent and a directly elected board. The school district has 5 schools:

- Abraham Lincoln School (PreK - Grade 1)
- John F. Kennedy School (Grade 2 - Grade 3)
- Barack Obama School (Grade 4 - Grade 5)
- Milkovich Middle School (Grade 6 - Grade 8)
- Maple Heights High School (Grade 9 - Grade 12)

=== Private School ===
- Castle High School - East is a public charter school on Warrensville Center Road serving Grades 9 - 12.

== Notable people ==
- Dale Mohorcic (1956–), former pitcher for the Texas Rangers
- Mary Oliver (1935–2019), American poet, Pulitzer Prize winner
