= Premier Athletic Conference =

The Premier Athletic Conference was an Ohio High School Athletic Association high school athletic conference that existed from 1998 until 2015 and was made up of member schools from Ashtabula, Geauga, and Lake counties in Ohio.

== All-time members ==
School	Nickname	Location	Colors	Tenure	Notes
Chardon	Hilltopers	Chardon	Red & black	1998–2015	to Western Reserve
Geneva	Eagles	Geneva	Scarlet & gray	2009–2015	to All-American
Lakeside	Dragons	Saybrook Township	Forest green & vegas gold	2007–2015	to Chagrin Valley
Madison	Blue Streaks	Madison	Blue & white	1998–2015	to Western Reserve
North	Rangers	Eastlake	Orange & black	1998–2015	to Western Reserve
Riverside	Beavers	Painsville	Black & yellow	1998–2015	to Western Reserve
South	Rebels	Willoughby	Columbia blue & gray	1998–2015	to Western Reserve
University School	Preppers	Hunting Valley	Maroon & black	1998–2015	left to become independent

== History ==
The Premier Athletic Conference was established in 1998 and initially consisted of schools such as Chardon, Eastlake North, Madison, Painesville Riverside, and Willoughby South, which remained core members throughout the conference's existence. These programs formed the foundation of the league and maintained long-standing rivalries over its 17-year history.

Lakeside joined the conference in 2007, followed by Geneva in 2009, making the conference membership up to 8 schools, and would remain stagnant until the leagues demise in 2015.

By the early 2010s, however, the conference began to experience instability. Concerns over travel demands, competitive imbalance, and the desire for more localized rivalries led many member schools to seek new affiliations. The Premier Athletic Conference officially dissolved following the 2014–15 school year. Its breakup coincided with the collapse of the Northeast Ohio Conference and a widespread restructuring of athletic conferences across the region. School such as North, South, Madison, Riverside, and Chardon all went on to reform the Western Reserve Conference, Lakeside went on to join the All-American Conference. Geneva, who originally intended to join the Western Reserve Conference, flipped their commitment and joined the Chagrin Valley Conference instead.
