= Don Delaney =

American basketball coach and executive

Biographical details
- Born: January 3, 1936; South Euclid, Ohio, U.S.
- Died: February 16, 2011 (aged 75); Mayfield Heights, Ohio, U.S.
- Education: Kent State University

Coaching career (HC unless noted)
- 1960–64: North HS (OH)
- 1964–68: Kirtland HS (OH)
- 1968–77: Lakeland CC
- 1977–80: Dyke College
- 1981: Cleveland Cavaliers
- 1983–84: Cleveland Cavaliers (Asst)

Administrative career (AD unless noted)
- 1980–83: Cleveland Cavaliers (GM)

Head coaching record
- Overall: 7–19 (NBA)

Don Delaney (January 3, 1936 – February 16, 2011) was an American professional basketball coach, who served as head coach and general manager of the Cleveland Cavaliers in the early 1980s.

== Early life ==
Delaney was born on January 3, 1936, in South Euclid, Ohio. He was a lifelong resident of Willoughby, Ohio. He earned bachelor's and master's degrees from Kent State University.

== Career ==
Delaney began his coaching career in 1960 at North High School in Eastlake, Ohio. In 1964 he moved to Kirtland High School in Kirtland, Ohio. He then moved to the college ranks with Lakeland Community College. In 1974 he was named Greater Cleveland college coach of the year by The Plain Dealer after leading Lakeland to its third consecutive 20-win season. In 1977 he became head coach of Dyke College. He also coached a professional softball team owned by Ted Stepien, who also owned the Cleveland Cavaliers.

On June 4, 1980, he was named general manager of the Cleveland Cavaliers. Although Delaney held the title of general manager, most personnel decisions were made by Stepien and player personnel director Bill Musselman. On March 13, 1981, he took over as interim head coach after Stepien removed Musselman. On March 29, 1981, owner Ted Stepien announced that Delaney would coach the team the following season. On December 3, 1981, Stepien removed Delaney as head coach, but retained him as general manager. Delaney compiled a 7–19 record over the 1980–81 and 1981–82 seasons. He served as an assistant coach for the Cavaliers during the 1983–84 season.

== Later life ==
After leaving the Cavaliers, Delaney owned a bar in Mentor, Ohio. He suffered a stroke in 2001 and was in poor health until his death on February 16, 2011, at the age of 75.

== Head coaching record ==
Team	Year	G	W	L	W–L%	Finish	PG	PW	PL	PW–L%	Result
Cleveland	1980–81	11	3	8	.273	5th in Central	—	—	—	—	Missed playoffs
Cleveland	1981–82	15	4	11	.267	(fired)	—	—	—	—	
Career		26	7	19	.269		0	0	0	–	
