= Kaayla Chones =

American basketball player (born 1981)

Personal information
- Born: January 11, 1981 (age 45) Pepper Pike, Ohio, U.S.
- Listed height: 6 ft 3 in (1.91 m)
- Listed weight: 180 lb (82 kg)

Career information
- High school: North (Eastlake, Ohio)
- College: NC State (1999–2004)
- WNBA draft: 2004: 2nd round, 15th overall pick
- Drafted by: Washington Mystics
- Position: Center
- Number: 50

Career history
- 2004–2005: Washington Mystics
- 2006: Seattle Storm

Career highlights
- First-team All-ACC (2004); 2× Second-team All-ACC (2002–2003)
- Stats at Basketball Reference

Kaayla Chones (born January 11, 1981) is an American former professional basketball center who played for the Washington Mystics and Seattle Storm of the Women's National Basketball Association (WNBA). She played college basketball at NC State.

== Early life ==
Kaayla Chones was born on January 11, 1981, in Pepper Pike, Ohio. She is the daughter of former NBA player Jim Chones. She played at Trinity High School her freshman year and won the 1996 state title.

She then played three years of basketball at North High School in Eastlake, Ohio, Chones was the Ohio co-Ms. Basketball for both her junior and senior years. She was also a three-time USA Today All-American, and set school records in scoring, rebounding and blocked shots for both boys and girls. She helped the team earn a 21–4 record and advance to the regional “sweet 16” her senior season. Chones scored over 2,000 points and recorded over 1,600 rebounds during her high school career.

== College career ==
Chones played college basketball for the NC State Wolfpack from 1999–00 to 2003–04. She started 29 games in her freshman year, averaging 11.4 points per game and 7.9 rebounds per game while also earning Atlantic Coast Conference (ACC) All-Freshman and honorable mention All-ACC honors. She was medically redshirted during the 2000–01 season. Chones played in 29 games in 2001–02, averaging 12.3 points, 7.0 rebounds, and 1.0 block per game while being named second-team All-ACC. Chones appeared in 28 games during the 2002–03 season, averaging 13.8 points, 7.8 rebounds, and 1.2 blocks while garnering second-team all-ACC recognition for the second consecutive season. She played in 31 games during her senior year in 2003–04, averaging 14.7 points and 7.8 rebounds while also earning first-team All-ACC honors. She also garnered Kodak/WBCA All-America recognition as a senior.

== Professional career ==
Chones was selected by the Washington Mystics in the second round, with the 15th overall pick, of the 2004 WNBA draft. She played in 13 games, starting one, for the Mystics during her rookie year in 2004, averaging 2.2 points and 1.3 rebounds per game. She also appeared in two playoff games that season. Chones played in 12 games in 2005, averaging 1.2 points per game. She was waived by the Mystics on May 18, 2006, before the start of the regular season.

Chones signed with the Seattle Storm on May 20, 2006. She appeared in three games for the team before being waived on May 24, 2006.

She was signed by the Los Angeles Sparks on March 5, 2007. She was waived on May 18, 2007, before the start of the regular season.

Chones also played professionally in Spain, Italy, France, Hungary, and Israel, and won an Israeli league title in 2013.

== Post-playing career ==
In 2013, Chones became the director of player programs for the Minnesota Timberwolves of the National Basketball Association.

In 2019, she was inducted into both the Ohio Basketball Hall of Fame and The News-Herald Sports Hall of Fame.
