= Fairview High School (Fairview Park, Ohio) =

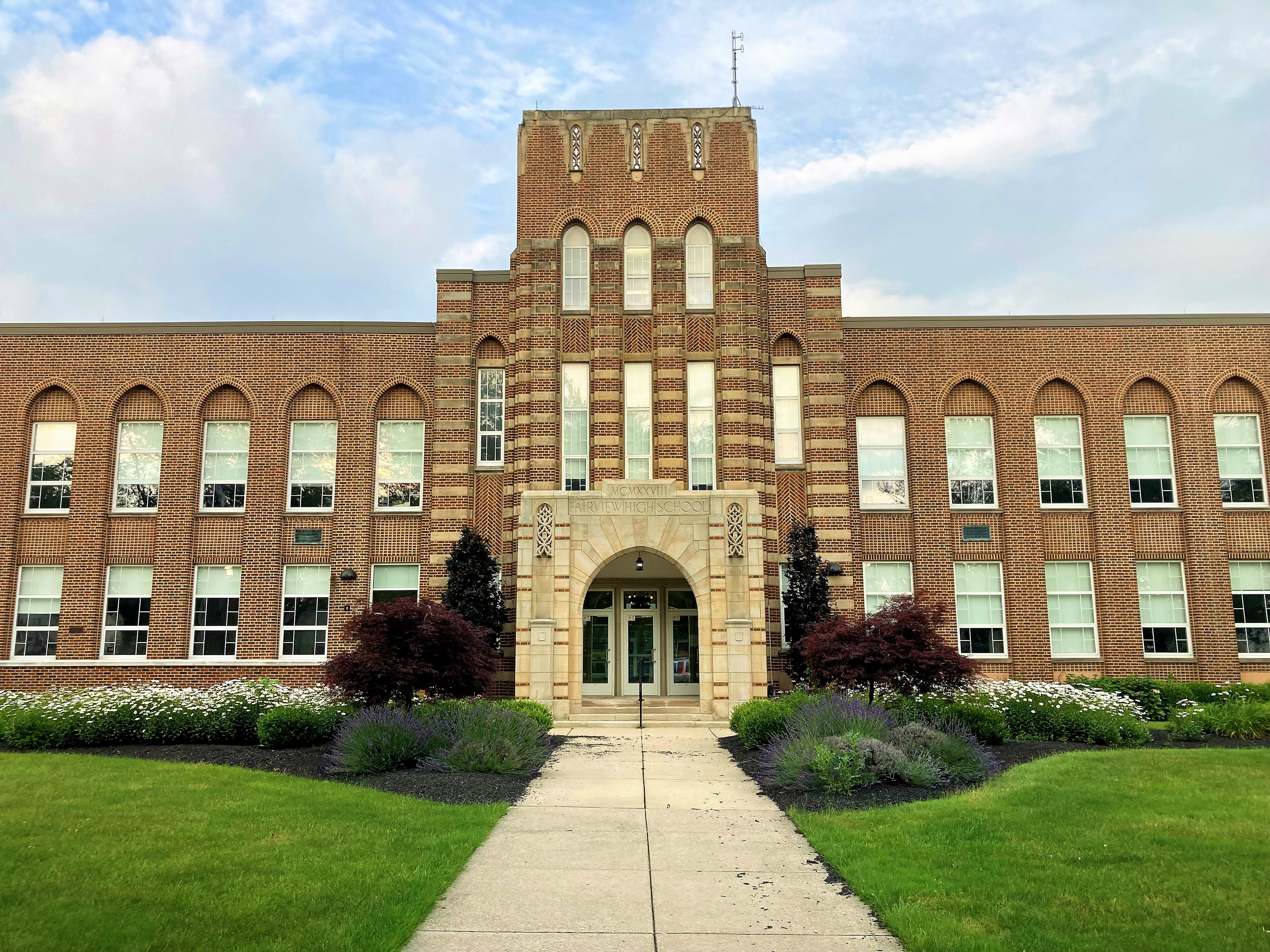

Location
- 4507 213th Street; Fairview Park, (Cuyahoga County), Ohio 44126; United States; 41°26′31″N 81°51′21″W

Information
- Type: Public high school
- Established: 1929
- School district: Fairview Park Schools
- Superintendent: Keith Ahearn
- CEEB code: 361250
- Principal: Chris Vicha
- Staff: 107
- Grades: 9-12
- Gender: Coeducational
- Enrollment: 596 (2023-24)
- Hours in school day: 8
- Colors: Scarlet and Gray
- Fight song: "Warrior Music"
- Athletics conference: Chagrin Valley Conference
- Mascot: Spartan
- Team name: Warriors
- Rival: Rocky River High School, Lutheran West
- ACT 2015 Score average: 21.9
- Website: Fairview High School

Fairview High School is a public high school located at 4507 West 213th Street in Fairview Park, Ohio, located just west of Cleveland, Ohio.

The school's colors are scarlet and gray. The athletic teams are known as the Warriors. The school fight song is "Buckeye". The school is a member of the Chagrin Valley Conference.

== History of FHS ==
Prior to 1928, there was no high school in Fairview Park. All high school students were sent to West High, West Tech, and later Rocky River High School. When the high school was first constructed, it contained twenty-one rooms and could accommodate 450 students. Dedicated on January 8, 1929, its first students were enrolled that same January with the sophomores being the upper classmen. These pupils were the first to graduate from Fairview High School on June 1, 1931.

The first addition to the high school was built in 1948 due to enrollment growth and the need for expanded curriculum. It included new industrial arts facilities, a 1,100-seat gymnasium, and assembly rooms. The original shop was remodeled, becoming a cafeteria.

Between 1952 and 1954, ten new classrooms were added as well as an art room, a music suite with practice rooms, a business education complex, and an auditorium with a seating capacity of 844 persons. These new additions made for a structure almost as large as the original building. Then, too, the library was doubled in size, the cafeteria enlarged, and the home economics wing, which was part of the original building, modernized. The dedication of the auditorium was combined with the 25th anniversary celebration of the opening of the original section.

The high school swimming pool opened in June 1961, the largest of any Cuyahoga County school at the time. In 1968, the science wing saw expansion with the addition of seven classrooms and a planetarium. An auto mechanics building opened on the high school grounds located by the athletic practice fields in October 1970.

In 2007 the auto mechanics building was torn down in the early stages of the new Gemini Project. Which also involved removing the swimming pool and extending the high school gym. The varsity swim team now utilizes the swimming pool at the Fairview Recreation Gemimi Center.

Most of the electrical and lighting throughout the high school and middle school was replaced in 2007-08 as part of the schools' upgrades.

Beginning in late 2017, the school began to receive a massive renovation. This renovation involved the complete restructuring and remaking of classrooms, a wholly new cafeteria, upgraded hallways and facilities, redone music rooms, including a new orchestra room, and a completely new, smaller section of the building. This renovation project was completed in 2020.

Beginning in 2019, the school underwent a rebranding that saw the removal of the longtime "Warrior" mascot in favor of a new one, with the same name but now a Spartan warrior. The "F" symbol also started to phase out. The school's branding also began to emphasize its project-based learning system, career-readiness programs, and sense of school spirit.

== Student academics ==
Despite being a small school, a wide variety of classes are offered to the students, including several Advanced Placement classes, honor courses, and vocational opportunities with Polaris Career Center. Foreign languages such as Spanish and French are offered as well.

== Extracurricular activities and athletics ==
Fairview offers an assortment of sports to the students, including football, soccer, cross country, tennis, swimming, basketball, track and field, baseball, and softball. Extracurricular activities are offered as well, including PenOhio, opportunity to become a member of National Honor Society, synchronized swimming, student government, yearbook, Because I Said I Would, and key club.

== Ohio High School Athletic Association State Championships ==
- Boys Swimming - 1964
- Girls Volleyball – 1985, 1988
