= Dan Whalen =

American football player (born 1988)

Profile
- Position: Quarterback

Personal information
- Born: August 6, 1988 (age 38); Willoughby, Ohio
- Listed height: 6 ft 1 in (1.85 m)
- Listed weight: 195 lb (88 kg)

Career information
- High school: South (Willoughby, Ohio)
- College: Case Western Reserve
- NFL draft: 2011: undrafted

Career history
- Cleveland Gladiators (2011); Orlando Predators (2012)

Career AFL statistics
- Completions: 23
- Attempts: 49
- Yards: 284
- Touchdowns: 6
- Interceptions: 1
- Stats at ArenaFan.com

Dan Whalen (born August 6, 1988) is an American former football quarterback from Willoughby, Ohio.

== Early life ==
Dan played high school football at Willoughby South High School. He only started one year, leading the Rebels to a 10–0 regular season while throwing for over 2,500 yards, 27 touchdowns and only 6 interceptions. In a first round playoff game against Olmsted Falls High School, Whalen threw for 356 yards and 5 touchdowns while only playing in the first half of a 49–10 win.

== College career ==
Whalen played at Case Western Reserve University under head coach Greg Debeljak. He was a four-year starter at Case throwing for 9,720 yards, with 742 completions from 1,229 attempts, and with 87 touchdowns, and graduated in 2009 as the school's all-time leader in pass attempts, completions, yards and touchdown passes. Whalen was named a first team All-American his senior season by the American Football Coaches Association (AFCA) and d3football.com. Dan was also a two-time finalist for the Gagliardi Trophy (Division III Player of the Year) and named University Athletic Association (UAA) Offensive Player of the Year three times. While the starting quarterback, Whalen led Case to 31 consecutive regular season wins, three straight perfect regular seasons, three straight UAA titles, and three straight NCAA postseasons. Dan also played punter in college.

== Professional career ==
=== Cleveland Gladiators ===
Assigned (added to the roster) to the Cleveland Gladiators on Feb. 2, 2011 and removed from the Gladiator's roster on March 13, 2011. Whalen then returned to the roster two weeks later on March 25, 2011.

Dan played in parts of six games for the Gladiators in the 2011 season, leading two come from behind wins, going 23 for 49 and passing for 284 yards with 9 total touchdowns and 1 interception.

Midway through the season, Whalen decided to leave the team to pursue his career as a writer. He was reassigned on June 6, 2011.

=== Orlando Predators ===
Assigned (added to the roster) to the Orlando Predators on March 20, 2012.
