= Jason Griffith =

American actor

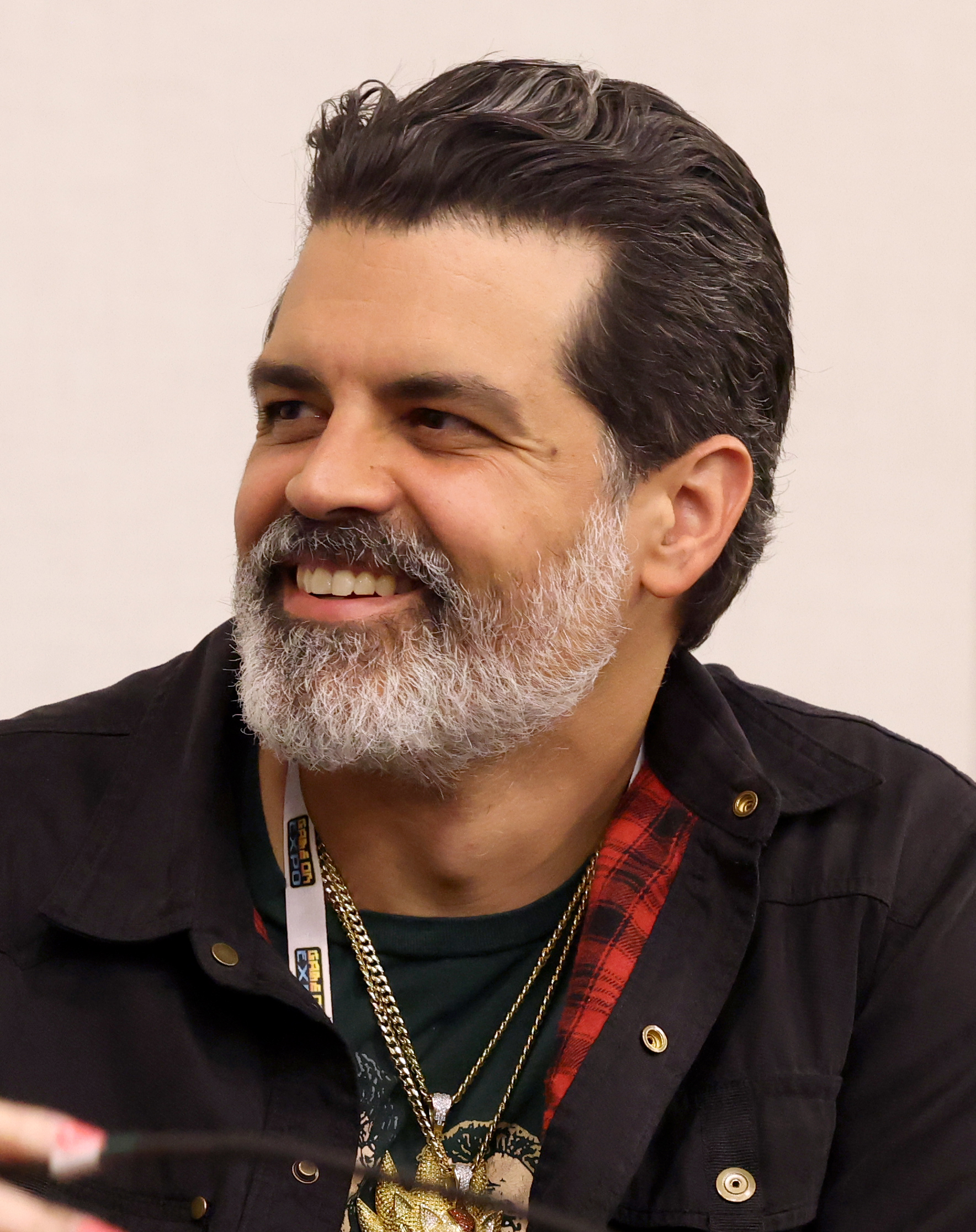
- Griffith in 2025
- Born: Jason Adam Griffith; Lakeline, Ohio, U.S.
- Other names: J. Griff; Adam Caroleson; DJ Tanner
- Occupation: Actor
- Years active: 1997–present
- Spouse: Melissa Ryan (m. 2015)
- Children: 2

Jason Adam Griffith is an American actor best known for his voice acting work, he portrayed Sonic the Hedgehog and Shadow the Hedgehog in the 4Kids Entertainment English dub of the anime Sonic X, and reprised both roles from 2005 to 2010, and Jet the Hawk from 2006 to 2009, for Sonic the Hedgehog video games.

His other voice roles for 4Kids Entertainment include Usopp in One Piece, and Brawly in Pokémon, among others. He parted ways with the company in 2010 and has since done voice work for NYAV Post and DuArt Film and Video.

== Early life ==
Jason Griffith was born in Lakeline, Ohio. He graduated from the North High School in Eastlake, Ohio in 1999.

== Career ==
Griffith began his acting career in 1997, at seventeen years old. He made his feature film debut in the romantic comedy-drama film, Edge of Seventeen in an uncredited role as Scott. He also had an uncredited role as Cassius in the 2008 thriller film, Kill Kill Faster Faster. In television, he appeared in an episode of Blue Bloods as a man wearing a suit inside a red sportscar.

In 2003, Griffith began extensive work as a voice actor. He served as in-house voice talent for the children's television block 4Kids TV, which led him to voice many characters in various animated media including Tom Majors in Chaotic and Miyamoto Usagi in Teenage Mutant Ninja Turtles. He was also an occasional promotional announcer for the block, as well as for The CW4Kids and Toonzai. He also provided the voice of Bongo the Monkey in commercial advertising for Danimals.

Through his voice work as the titular character, Sonic the Hedgehog, for the 4Kids English dub of Sonic X, Griffith was brought on by Sega to portray Sonic (replacing Ryan Drummond), Shadow the Hedgehog (replacing David Humphrey), and Jet the Hawk in the mainline video games for the Sonic the Hedgehog series. Griffith began voicing Sonic and Shadow with 2005's Shadow the Hedgehog and ended with 2010's Sonic & Sega All-Stars Racing, and began voicing Jet with 2006's Sonic Riders and ended with 2009's Mario & Sonic at the Olympic Winter Games. During this time, he was often credited as "Adam Caroleson". His role as Sonic was passed to Roger Craig Smith, while his role as Shadow was passed to Kirk Thornton and his role as Jet was passed to Michael Yurchak in 2010. Other than Sonic, Shadow and Jet, Griffith also voiced Sonic the Werehog and Professor Pickle's Assistant in Sonic Unleashed and Newscaster in episode 16 and Prison Guard in episode 42 in Sonic X.

From 2011 to 2012, he starred in the web comedy series Casters as Cal. In 2015, he starred in the English dub of the animated children's series Super Wings.

In 2020, 2021 and 2024, Griffith reprised his role as Sonic and Shadow in the YouTube fan series Sonic and Tails R.

== Personal life ==
Griffith married Melissa Ryan on August 15, 2015. They have two sons.

== Filmography ==
=== Live-action ===
==== Film ====
Year	Title	Role	Notes
1998	Edge of Seventeen	Scott	Uncredited
2007	Am I Evil	Greg	
2008	Kill Kill Faster Faster	Cassius	Uncredited
2008	The Machine Girl	Ryota, Additional voices	English dub
2009	ManDate	Chris	Short
2013	The Penny Dreadful Picture Show	Clive	
2016	Monsterland	Doctor	Segment: "The Grey Matter"
2016	C Street	Congressman Wood	
2017	Hold on Loosely	Ronnie	Short
2018	Yucatán	Additional voices	English dub
2019	Threebound	Matt Cahill	Also producer
2019	Mr. Styx and Me	Teo	Short
2020	Psycho Sally	Manny	Short
2021	Andromeda	Griffin	Short
2022	Lift	Edward	Short
2024	A Complete Unknown	Additional voices	

==== Television ====
Year	Title	Role	Notes
2011	Blue Bloods	Suit in Red Sportscar	Episode: "Black and Blue"
2020	The Last Word	Konstantin Nowak (voice)	English version 5 episodes
2022	The Orville	Krill Soldier	Episode #3.10
2023	Chronicles of Jessica Wu	Officer Miller	Episode: "Wanna get away?"

=== Voice roles ===
==== Film ====
Year	Title	Role	Notes
2006	Pokémon: Lucario and the Mystery of Mew	Sir Aaron	
2008	Sonic: Night of the Werehog	Sonic the Hedgehog / Sonic the Werehog	Short
2009	Pokémon: Arceus and the Jewel of Life	Marcus	
2009	Turtles Forever	1984 Mirage Leonardo	As Adam Caroleson
2010	Animals United	Toto	
2011	The Painting	Additional voices	
2011	Pokémon the Movie: Black—Victini and Reshiram and White—Victini and Zekrom	Cilan	
2012	Pokémon the Movie: Kyurem vs. the Sword of Justice	Cilan	
2013	Pokémon the Movie: Genesect and the Legend Awakened	Cilan	
2015	009 Re:Cyborg	009/Joe Shimamura	
2016	Psychic School Wars	Saito	
2017	The Guardian Brothers	Chet Spiritman	
2017	GadgetGang in Outer Space	Robots	
2018	The Snow Queen 3: Fire and Ice	Kai, Admiral, Additional voices	
2018	Pixi Saves Christmas	Melchior, Elfreud, Anelfmari	
2019	UglyDolls	Additional voices	
2019	Tall Tales from the Magical Garden of Antoon Krings	Benny	
2019	Mazinger Z: Infinity	Mucha	
2021	Sheep and Wolves: Pig Deal	Skinny, Additional voices	
2021	Vivo	Additional voices	
2021	Night of the Animated Dead	Scientist #2, Police Officer	
2022	Paws of Fury: The Legend of Hank	Additional voices	

==== Anime ====
Year	Title	Role	Notes
2003–2006	Sonic X	Sonic the Hedgehog, Shadow the Hedgehog, Newscaster (ep 16), Prison Guard (ep 42)	78 episodes
2003–2023	Pokémon	Brawly, Cilan, Looker, Timmy Grimm, Tate, Marcus, Additional voices	207 episodes
2004	Gravitation	Tatsuha Uesugi	
2004–2007	One Piece	Usopp, Yasopp	95 episodes 4Kids version
2005–2008	Yu-Gi-Oh! GX	Atticus Rhodes, Nightshroud, Harrington Rosewood, Osamu	22 episodes
2008–2011	Yu-Gi-Oh! 5D's	Primo, Ghost, Taka, Shira, Robert Pearson	
2009	Kurokami: The Animation	Keita Ibuki	
2010	Slayers Evolution-R	Abel Ranzaad	
2010	Bakuman	Hayato, Kawasaki	13 episodes
2011–2015	Yu-Gi-Oh! Zexal	Nistro, Caswell Francis	46 episodes
2015–2017	Yu-Gi-Oh! Arc-V	Herk, Reed Pepper, Iggy Arlo, Officer 227	2 episodes
2018	FLCL Progressive	Masurao	5 episodes
2022	Romantic Killer	Kazuki Tsukasa	
2023	Vinland Saga	Snake, Berge	Netflix dub
2025	My Happy Marriage Season 2	Tadakiyo Kudo	
2025	New Panty & Stocking with Garterbelt	Farm Boy	Episode 4

==== Animation ====
Year	Title	Role	Notes
2002–2003	Mission Odyssey	Zephyr	
2004–2023	GoGoRiki	Chikoriki (Yozhik/Ежик)	4Kids dub
2004–2009	Teenage Mutant Ninja Turtles	Utrom, Miyamoto Usagi, Raxis, additional voices	12 episodes
2005	G.I. Joe Sigma 6	Snake Eyes	Flashbacks
2005	Winx Club	Darkar	23 episodes 4Kids version
2006–2010	Chaotic	Tom Majors, Zhade, Frafdo	Credited as Adam Caroleson
2008	Three Delivery	Additional voices	
2008–2009	TMNT: Back to the Sewer	Miyamoto Usagi	
2009	Astonishing X-Men	Elixir	Motion comic
2009	Angel's Friends	Sulfus	Episode: "Volare con le proprie ali"
2010	Iron Man: Extremis	Iron Man/Tony Stark	Motion comic
2004–2006	Blue's Room	The Small Green Thing	
2004–2006	Tai Chi Chasers	Yanima	
2011	Shaktimaan: The Animated Series	Vehaan Arya / Shaktimaan	
2011	Virus Attack		
2013–2014	The Crumpets	Grownboy	Distribimage version
2013–2016	Alisa Knows What to Do!	Professor Salazar	
2014–2015	Super 4	Additional voices	
2015, 2017	Super Wings	Bello	3 episodes
2016	World of Winx	Ace	
2016	Lastman	Additional voices	4 episodes
2017	Tip the Mouse	Snail #2	
2023	Hero Inside	Ginseng Man, Lucy's Father	Episode: "Revolution"

==== Video games ====
Year	Title	Voice role	Notes
2004	Teenage Mutant Ninja Turtles 2: Battle Nexus	Slashuur, Miyamoto Usagi	
2005	One Piece: Grand Battle	Usopp	
2005	Sonic Rush	Sonic the Hedgehog	
2005	Shadow the Hedgehog	Shadow the Hedgehog, Shadow Androids, Sonic the Hedgehog	
2006	Neverwinter Nights 2	Bevil	
2006	Sonic Riders	Sonic the Hedgehog, Jet the Hawk, Shadow the Hedgehog	
2006	Sonic the Hedgehog	Sonic the Hedgehog, Shadow the Hedgehog	
2006	Sonic Rivals	Sonic the Hedgehog, Shadow the Hedgehog	
2007	Sonic and the Secret Rings	Sonic the Hedgehog, Shadow the Hedgehog	Credited as Adam Caroleson
2007	Sonic Rush Adventure	Sonic the Hedgehog	
2007	Sonic Rivals 2	Sonic the Hedgehog, Shadow the Hedgehog	
2007	Mario & Sonic at the Olympic Games	Sonic the Hedgehog, Shadow the Hedgehog	
2008	Sonic Riders: Zero Gravity	Sonic the Hedgehog, Jet the Hawk, Shadow the Hedgehog	Credited as Adam Caroleson
2008	Super Smash Bros. Brawl	Sonic the Hedgehog, Shadow the Hedgehog	Credited as Adam Caroleson
2008	Sega Superstars Tennis	Sonic the Hedgehog, Shadow the Hedgehog	Archive audio
2008	Alone in the Dark	Hammet, Jack the Watchman	PC and 7th-gen versions only
2008	Sonic Unleashed	Sonic the Hedgehog / Werehog, Professor Pickle's Assistant	
2009	Sonic and the Black Knight	Sonic the Hedgehog, Shadow the Hedgehog, Jet the Hawk	
2009	Teenage Mutant Ninja Turtles: Smash-Up	Foot Ninja	
2009	Mario & Sonic at the Olympic Winter Games	Sonic the Hedgehog, Shadow the Hedgehog, Jet the Hawk	
2010	Shira Oka: Second Chances	Sakuragi Hiroshi	
2010	Sonic & Sega All-Stars Racing	Sonic the Hedgehog, Shadow the Hedgehog	Archive audio
2010	I Spy Spooky Mansion	Riddle Reader	
2012	Batman: The Dark Knight Rises	Jonathan Crane	
2012	Modern Combat 4: Zero Hour	SGS Soldier	
2013	Thor: The Dark World	Marauder 3, Dark Elf 4, Einharjar 1	
2014	Modern Combat 5: Blackout	Alex Hawk	
2014	Dungeon Hunter 5	Malcor	
2014	Asphalt Overdrive	Cop	
2017	Yu-Gi-Oh! Duel Links	Primo	
2017	White Day: A Labyrinth Named School	Music Teacher, Bong-gu	
2018	Pathfinder: Kingmaker	Baron	
2021	The Artful Escape	Caretaker, Gnarl Sagan, Record Store Clerk	
2022	Elex II	Falk	
2022	Neon White	Additional voices	
2022	Call of Duty: Modern Warfare II	Additional voices	
2023	Wo Long: Fallen Dynasty	Yuan Shao	English version

=== Commercials ===
Title	Role	Ref.
4Kids TV	Sonic the Hedgehog, Usopp	
Danimals	Bongo the Monkey	
Mario & Sonic at the Olympic Games	Sonic the Hedgehog	
Shadow the Hedgehog	Shadow the Hedgehog	

=== Web ===
Year	Title	Role	Notes
2011–2012	Casters	Cal	6 episodes
2018	Kappa Crypto	Mr. Salazar	8 episodes
2020–2021, 2024	Sonic and Tails R	Sonic the Hedgehog, Shadow the Hedgehog	3 episodes YouTube fan-made audio drama series
2024	One Real Sonic	Sonic the Hedgehog, Alternate Sonic	YouTube fan-made animation
TBA	Sonic the Hedgehog: Metal Mania	Sonic the Hedgehog	YouTube fan-made animated short film
