= WINT (AM) =

Radio station in Willoughby, Ohio

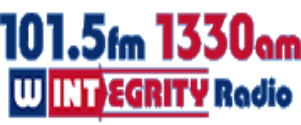
- Willoughby, Ohio; United States
- Broadcast area: Lake County; Greater Cleveland (limited)
- Frequency: 1330 kHz
- Branding: Integrity Radio

Programming
- Format: Conservative talk
- Affiliations: Townhall News; Premiere Networks; Westwood One

Ownership
- Owner: Raymond & Ronald Somich; (Spirit Broadcasting)

History
- First air date: January 27, 1965
- Former call signs: WELW (1965–2014)
- Call sign meaning: Integrity Radio

Technical information
- Licensing authority: FCC
- Facility ID: 26221
- Class: D
- Power: 500 watts (day); 42 watts (night)
- Transmitter coordinates: 41°38′57.00″N 81°25′25.00″W
- Translator: 101.5 W268CO (Willoughby)

Links
- Public license information: Public file; LMS
- Webcast: Listen live
- Website: wintradio.com

WINT (1330 AM) is a commercial radio station licensed to Willoughby, Ohio, United States, featuring a conservative talk format as "Integrity Radio". Owned by Raymond and Ronald Somich as Spirit Broadcasting, WINT serves Lake County and eastern portions of Greater Cleveland with studios and transmitter located on Stevens Boulevard at the border of Willoughby and Eastlake. In addition to a standard analog transmission, WINT is relayed over low-power Willoughby translator W268CO (101.5 FM) and is also available online.

== History ==
The station first broadcast on January 27, 1965, as WELW. As the station's AM transmitter site (and current studio site) resides on the Eastlake-Willoughby border, the call letters stood for Eastlake and Willoughby. WELW's first format was briefly religious; subsequently, it has had top 40, country music, oldies, and news/talk formats. WELW almost always has broadcast nationality music shows, local sports and some religious programs. Spirit Broadcasting assumed ownership in February 1990. Over the years, the station has been honored countless times for its community service, as well as receiving Associated Press awards.

On March 31, 2014, as a part of the station's 50th anniversary, WELW re-launched as Integrity Radio 1330 and changed its call sign to WINT to match the branding. The station also upgraded their signal to serve more of the Cleveland radio market. In July 2015, WINT began simulcasting on translator W268CO (101.5 FM) from a site in Kirtland.

=== FM translator ===
Broadcast translator for WINT
| Call sign | Frequency | City of license | FID | ERP (W) | HAAT | Class | Transmitter coordinates | FCC info |
|---|---|---|---|---|---|---|---|---|
| W268CO | 101.5 FM | Willoughby, Ohio | 106489 | 250 | 127.46 m (418 ft) | D | 41°35′30.2″N 81°21′3.4″W | LMS |

== Current programming ==
WINT carries national talk radio programs hosted by Doug Stephan, Armstrong & Getty, Sean Hannity, Dana Loesch and Dave Ramsey. Nationality programming is aired on Sunday mornings. Additionally, the station offers a small part of its broadcast schedule for purchase by program providers.

WINT was the flagship station of the Lake County Captains minor league baseball team when they moved to Ohio in 2003. The Captains are now broadcast on a stream of WJCU, but not over the air. In 2014, WINT added NASCAR and IndyCar races to its programming. The station also broadcasts area high school football and basketball games, and occasionally Lake Erie College Football games, as well as locally produced and originated shows focusing on sports talk, tech and computer, business and legal, plus veterans and senior issues.

With the realization that many polka music fans from Ohio and the Steel Belt have retired to warmer climates, WINT also began and serves as base operation for a 24/7 streaming polka website, 247polkaheaven.com, which was the first of its kind in the world. Known as the "World's Polka Network", it features polka hosts and music from across the United States and Canada.
