= Chagrin Valley Conference =

US high school athletic conference

The Chagrin Valley Conference is an Ohio High School Athletic Association athletic league that began competition in 1964. It is made up of member school from Ashtabula, Cuyahoga, Geauga, Lake and Portage counties in Ohio.

== Members ==
School	Nickname	Location	Colors	Year joined	Notes
Chagrin Division
Edgewood	Warriors	Ashtabula	Scarlet & gray	2019	Moved from Lake to Chagrin in 2026
Hawken	Hawks	Gates Mills	Red & gray	1996	
Geneva	Eagles	Geneva	Scarlet & gray	2015	Moved from Lake to Chagrin in 2026
Jefferson Area	Falcons	Jefferson	Red, white, & black	2023	Moved from Lake to Chagrin in 2026
Orange	Lions	Pepper Pike	Orange & black	1964, 1998	left for Western Reserve Conference in 1996, rejoined in 1998
Perry	Pirates	Perry	Scarlet & white	1996	
West Geauga	Wolverines	Chesterland	Navy blue & white	1963, 1998	left for Western Reserve Conference in 1996, rejoined in 1998
Lake Division
Chardon	Hilltoppers	Chardon	Red & black	1964, 1983, 2026	left for East Suburban Conference in 1980, Premier Athletic Conference in 1998, rejoined 2026
Harvey	Red Raiders	Painesville	Red & black	2009	Moved from Chagrin to Lake in 2026
Lakeside	Dragons	Ashtabula	Forest green & Vegas gold	2019	
Lutheran West	Longhorns	Rocky River	Red & white	2019	Leaving for the North Coast Conference in 2027; Moved from Chagrin to Lake in 2026
Madison	Blue Streaks	Madison	Blue & white	2023	
North	Rangers	Eastlake	Orange & black	2026	
South	Rebels	Willoughby	Columbia blue & gray	2026	
Metro Division
Beachwood	Bison	Beachwood	White & gold	2005	
Brooklyn	Hurricanes	Brooklyn	Blue & gold	2019	
Cuyahoga Heights	Red Wolves	Cuyahoga Heights	Scarlet & gray	2005	
Independence	Blue Devils	Independence	Royal blue & gold	2005	
Fairport Harding	Skippers	Fairport Harbor	Maroon & white	2005, 2026	left for in 2020, Northeastern Athletic Conference rejoined in 2026
Trinity	Trojans	Garfield Heights	Blue & white	2019	
Richmond Heights	Spartans	Richmond Heights	Blue & white	2005	Independent for boys basketball only
Wickliffe	Blue Devils	Wickliffe	Navy blue & gold	1980	Moved from Valley to Metro in 2026
Valley Division
Berkshire	Badgers	Burton	Purple & gold	1996	
Conneaut	Spartans	Conneaut	Navy blue & gold	2023	Moved from Lake to Valley in 2026
Chagrin Falls	Tigers	Chagrin Falls	Orange & black	1964	
Crestwood	Red Devils	Mantua	Red & gray	2020	leaving for Greater Portage Athletic Conference in 2027
Fairview	Warriors	Fairview Park	Scarlet & gray	2023	Moved from Metro to Valley in 2026
Kirtland	Hornets	Kirtland	Navy blue & gold	1996	
Rootstown	Rovers	Rootstown	Navy blue & white	2025	leaving for Greater Portage Athletic Conference in 2027

== Former members ==
School	Nickname	Location	Colors	Tenure	Notes
Aurora	Greenmen	Aurora	Green & white	1964–1983, 1996–2015	Left for the East Suburban Conference and for the Suburban League
Cardinal	Huskies	Middlefield	Red & white	1996–2025	Left for Northeastern Athletic Conference
Grand Valley	Mustangs	Orwell	Royal blue, navy blue, gray, & white	1998–2009, 2019–2024	Left both times for the Northeastern Athletic Conference
Kenston	Bombers	Bainbridge	Blue & white	1964–1996, 2005–2015	Left both times for two separate versions of the Western Reserve Conference
Newbury	Black Knights	Newbury	Orange & black	1998–2014	Left for the Northeastern Athletic Conference
Solon	Comets	Solon	Navy blue, gold, & white	1964–1996	Left for the Western Reserve Conference
Twinsburg	Tigers	Twinsburg	Blue & white	1964–1996	Left for the Western Reserve Conference

== History ==
The Chagrin Valley Conference was founded in 1964 with Chagrin Falls High School, Kenston High School, Orange High School, Solon High School, Twinsburg High School, and West Geauga High School as charter members. Aurora High School and Chardon High School joined the conference in 1968, increasing membership to eight schools. The conference takes its name from the Chagrin River, which flows through the region where many of the founding schools are located.

The conference remained largely stable until 1980 when Chardon departed for the East Suburban Conference and was replaced by Wickliffe High School. When Aurora left for the Metro Athletic Conference in 1983, Chardon returned to the CVC as its replacement.

In the mid-1990s, Chagrin Falls and Wickliffe proposed creating a small-school division within the conference to improve competitive balance. Aurora was invited to rejoin, along with Hawken School and four schools from the East Suburban Conference: Berkshire High School, Cardinal High School, Kirtland High School, and Perry High School. However, the proposed two-division structure collapsed when Kenston, Orange, Solon, Twinsburg, and West Geauga left in 1996 to form the Western Reserve Conference with several members of the Metro League. Chardon later joined the Premier Athletic Conference. Following these departures, the remaining eight schools formed the core of the restructured CVC. In 1998, the conference formally adopted a two-division, 12-school format. Orange and West Geauga returned to the conference and joined Aurora, Chagrin Falls, Perry, and Wickliffe in the Chagrin Division. The Valley Division consisted of Berkshire, Cardinal, Hawken, Kirtland, and two additional schools from the East Suburban Conference: Grand Valley High School and Newbury High School.

Following the dissolution of the MAC-8 Conference in 2005, Beachwood High School joined the Valley Division, while Cuyahoga Heights High School, Independence High School, and Richmond Heights High School joined Fairport Harding High School and Hawken to form the Metro Division. Kenston also returned to the conference during this period, though it later departed again in 2015 for a revived Western Reserve Conference. Aurora also left the CVC in 2015 to join the Suburban League. Grand Valley departed the conference in 2009.

The conference continued to expand in the following years. Harvey High School joined in 2009, followed by Geneva High School in 2015. A major expansion occurred in 2019 with the addition of Brooklyn High School, Edgewood High School, Grand Valley, Lakeside High School, Lutheran West High School, and Trinity High School, increasing conference membership to 22 schools.

Newbury left the conference for the Northeastern Athletic Conference in 2014 before the Newbury Local School District was later absorbed by the West Geauga district in 2020. Discussions regarding district consolidation had previously taken place among Newbury, Cardinal, and Berkshire before Berkshire ultimately absorbed the Ledgemont Local School District in 2015.

Further changes occurred in 2020 when Crestwood High School joined the conference, while Fairport Harding departed for the Northeastern Athletic Conference. Additional expansion followed in 2023 when Conneaut High School, Fairview High School, Jefferson Area High School, and Madison High School joined the conference, prompting the creation of the Lake Division.

Grand Valley departed the conference for a second time in 2024 to rejoin the Northeastern Athletic Conference. Later that year, Cardinal announced it would also leave for the NAC beginning with the 2025–26 school year. As a result, in October 2024 it was announced that Rootstown High School would leave the Portage Trail Conference and join the CVC’s Valley Division beginning in 2025–26.

In February 2025, the conference announced that Chardon and Fairport Harbor would return to the league along with North High School and South High School beginning in the 2026–27 school year. This expansion will increase the conference’s membership to 29 schools.

Additional changes were announced in May 2025 when the North Coast Conference invited Lutheran West to join beginning with the 2027–28 school year. In January 2026, the boards of education for Rootstown and Crestwood voted to leave the CVC in favor of the newly formed Greater Portage Athletic Conference, which is scheduled to begin competition in the 2027–28 school year.
