= Willoughby-Eastlake City School District =

School district in Ohio, United States

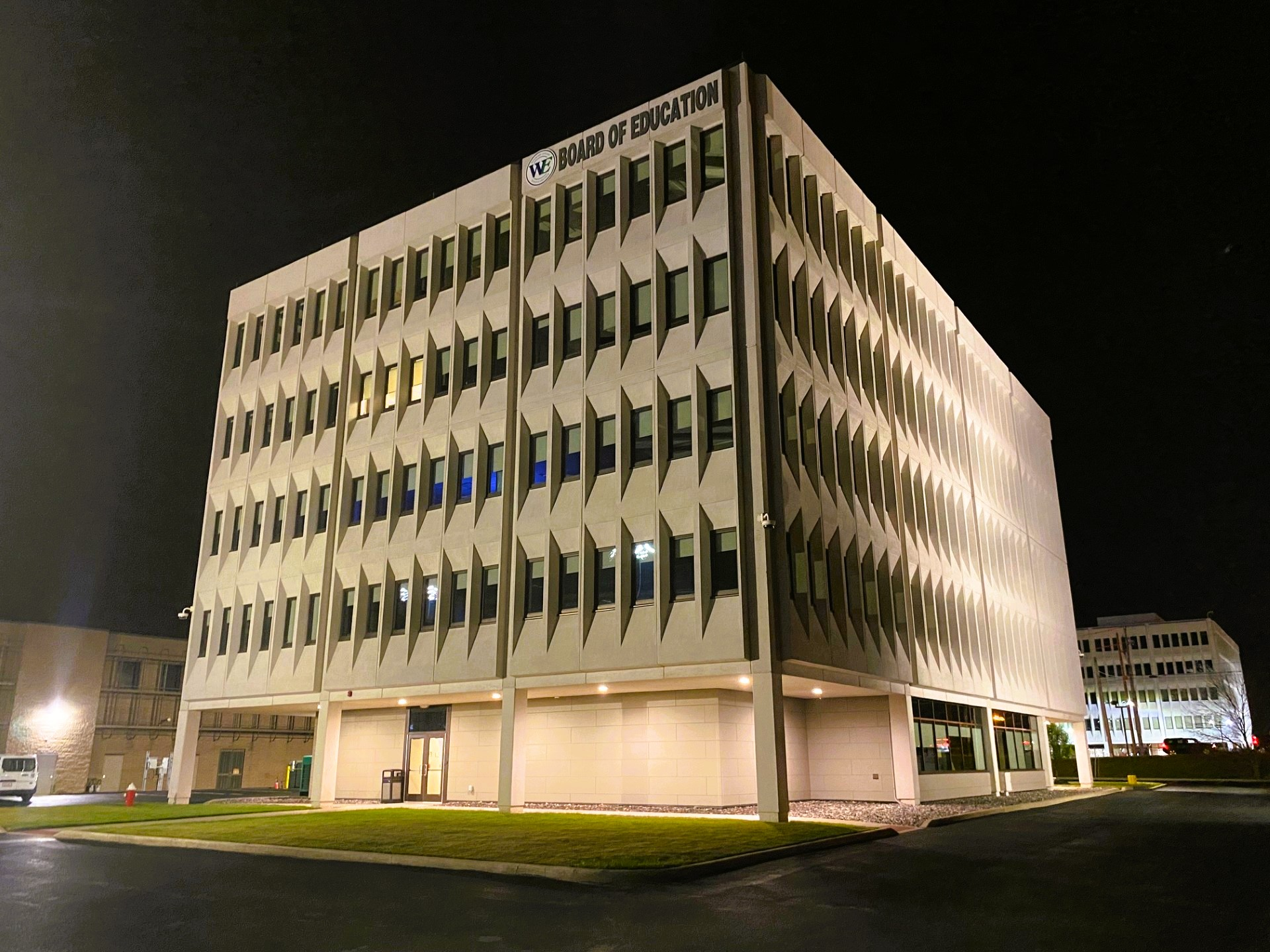
- Willoughby-Eastlake Board of Education building

Address
- 35353 Curtis Boulevard Eastlake, Ohio, 44095; United States

District information
- Type: Public
- Grades: PK–12
- Schools: 13
- NCES District ID: 3904510

Students and staff
- Students: 6,861 (2025–2026)
- Teachers: 448.94 (on an FTE basis) (2025–2026)
- Staff: 500.31 (on an FTE basis) (2025–2026)
- Student–teacher ratio: 15.28 (2025–2026)

Other information
- Website: www.weschools.org

Willoughby-Eastlake City School District is a public school district located in Lake County, Ohio. The district includes Eastlake, Lakeline, Timberlake, Willoughby Hills, Willowick, the majority of Willoughby, and a part of Waite Hill.

== Schools ==
=== Preschools ===
- Willoughby-Eastlake Preschool (34050 Glen Dr, Eastlake)

=== Elementary schools ===
- Edison Elementary School (5288 Karen Isle Dr, Willoughby)
- Grant Elementary School (2838 Lost Nation Rd, Willoughby)
- Jefferson Elementary School (35980 Lakeshore Blvd, Eastlake)
- Longfellow Elementary School (35200 Stevens Blvd, Eastlake)
- Royalview Elementary School (31500 Royalview Dr, Willowick)
- The School of Innovation, grades 3-8 (32500 Chardon Rd., Willoughby Hills)

=== Middle schools ===
- Eastlake Middle School (35972 Lakeshore Blvd, Eastlake)
- Willoughby Middle School (5000 Shankland Rd, Willoughby)
- Willowick Middle School (31500 Royalview Dr, Willowick)
- The School of Innovation, grades 3-8 (32500 Chardon Rd., Willoughby Hills)

=== High schools ===
- North High School (34041 Stevens Blvd, Eastlake)
- South High School (4900 Shankland Rd, Willoughby)
