= Katie McGregor =

American runner (born 1977)

Personal information
- Born: September 2, 1977 (age 49) Willoughby, Ohio
- Height: 5 ft 6 in (1.68 m)
- Weight: 120 lb (54 kg)

Sport
- Country: United States
- Events: Marathon, 10,000 m, Cross country
- College team: Michigan Wolverines
- Club: Team Running USA Minnesota
- Coached by: Dennis Barker

Achievements and titles
- World finals: 2007 10000 m, 13th 2005 10000 m, 14th
- Personal bests: 1500 m: 4:14.1 3000 m: 8:59.64; 5000 m: 15:22.60; 10000 m: 31:21.20; Half Marathon: 1:11:45 Marathon: 2:31:01

Katie McGregor (born September 2, 1977) is an American runner who participates in track, cross country and the marathon.

== High school ==
Born in Cleveland, McGregor attended Willoughby South High School in Willoughby, Ohio. She was the state champion of Ohio in the 3200-meter run with a time of 10:49.74 as a freshman (1992), and a state champion in the 1600-meter run with a time of 4:56.32 as a senior (1995).

== College ==
McGregor continued running as a student-athlete at the University of Michigan in the fall of 1995, majoring in English and competing in both cross country and track.

=== Freshman year: 1995/1996 ===
During her first season of cross country as a Wolverine, she was named Big Ten Freshman of the Year. She was the first freshman and first Wolverine to complete the course at the conference championship meet, helping her team to third-place finish behind the champion Wisconsin Badgers. In awful weather conditions at the NCAA District IV regional meet two weeks later, McGregor and her teammates were able to improve upon their performance at the Big Ten meet, with McGregor finishing in third-place and the Michigan team upsetting Wisconsin and winning the regional title outright. Their victory earned the team an automatic berth to the NCAA Women's Cross Country Championship. McGregor was the third Wolverine finisher in the championship (placing 39th overall), helping her team run to a seventh-place finish at the final meet.

=== Sophomore year: 1996/1997 ===
McGregor's sophomore cross country season was somewhat disappointing, as both she and all but one of her Wolverine teammates missed qualifying for the NCAA championship meet.

=== Junior year: 1997/1998 ===
During her junior cross country season in the fall of 1997, McGregor was named Big Ten Athlete of the Year after winning the individual title with a time of 17:14. She managed a second-place finish to teammate Elizabeth Kampfe in the NCAA District IV regional meet in mid-November, helping the Wolverines to clinch the runner-up spot and an automatic berth in the NCAA championship. A week later in the championship, McGregor earned All-America honors by running to a fourth-place finish in a time of 16:48. She was the first finisher for the Wolverines, leading the team to seventh-place in the meet overall.

During the indoor track season the following winter (1998), she won the two NCAA titles, one individually in the 3000-meter run with a time of 9:24.68, and another running the 1600-meter anchor leg in the distance medley relay, clocking a 4:38 split. During the outdoor track season, McGregor helped the Wolverines win the Big Ten championship by earning 14 points at the conference meet through a third-place finish in the 1500-meter run and a runner-up finish to Angie Kujak of the University of Wisconsin–Madison in the 5000-meter run. At the outdoor NCAA outdoor track and field championships in June, McGregor managed a runner-up finish to Amy Skieresz of the Arizona Wildcats in the 5000-meter run.

=== Senior year: 1998/1999 ===
McGregor's running success continued during her senior cross country season, when she won seven out of eight meets, including the Big Ten title in a time of 17:16, the Great Lakes Regional title in a time of 17:02.39, and the NCAA championship in a time of 16:47.21. For her efforts, McGregor was honored with the Honda Award, given to the nation's top female cross country runner. During the 1999 outdoor track season, she won her final collegiate championship, winning the Big Ten title in the 5000-meter run with a time of 16:32.83. She later bested this time at the NCAA meet, earning All-American honors by taking third place in the race with a time of 16:15.75. For her achievements during her senior year, McGregor was named University of Michigan Female Athlete of the Year. During her time competing for Michigan, she was a three-time NCAA champion, eight-time NCAA All-American, and three-time Big Ten Conference champion.

== Post-collegiate/professional ==
Following college, McGregor remained in Ann Arbor and continued training and competing under sponsorship from Adidas, transitioning from the shorter distance races to the 10000-meter run. In the spring of 2000, she achieved her first major post-collegiate victory, winning the 10000-meter run at the Stanford Invitational, setting a meet record with a time of 32:33.62. She competed in the event at the Olympic trials later that summer, but did not qualify to represent the U.S. team in Sydney, Australia. The following year, she moved to Minneapolis, and began training with Team Minnesota under sponsorship from Reebok.

Over the next few years, McGregor competed in variety of distance races, performing well, and continuing to improve upon her personal best times in several running events. Highlights during 2004 included a second-place finish at the U.S. Cross Country Championships (8000-meter distance), as well as personal bests in both the 5000-meter and 10000-meter runs prior to the Olympic Trials. At the Olympic Trials, she narrowly missed qualifying for the games in Athens, taking fourth place in the 10000-meter run. Despite finishing fourth, McGregor would have earned a spot on the Olympic team if she met the "A" standard of 31:45, but she finished with a time of 32:33.87. In regards to her performance she commented that "I was really angry, because I failed myself."

2005 saw her personal best times in all races continue to improve, culminating in a come-from-behind victory in the 10000-meter run at the U.S. Outdoor Championships in May. She competed in the event for the U.S. team at the IAAF World Championships in Athletics in Helsinki, Finland in August 2005, taking fourteenth place overall as the top U.S. finisher, with a personal best time of 31:21.20.

=== Longer distance races ===
In the autumn of 2006, McGregor began exploring longer distance races, competing in the New York City Marathon and achieving a ninth-place finish with a time of 2:32:36 in her debut at this distance.

In the spring of 2007, McGregor won the USATF 25 km championship, completing the River Bank Run in a time of 1:25:53 nearly three minutes ahead of the rest of the field. As part of the U.S. team in the summer of 2007, McGregor once again competed in the 10000-meter run at the IAAF Championships in Osaka, Japan, finishing in thirteenth place overall as the third U.S. finisher. During the autumn, she was named to the U.S. team running in the IAAF World Road Running Championships in Udine, Italy. She set a personal best in this competition, taking twenty-seventh place in the half marathon with a time of 1:12:01.

Success continued for McGregor in early 2008, with a fourth-place finish at the U.S. Cross Country Championships in San Diego. This marked her sixth consecutive year as a member of the national cross country team, with whom she will compete at the IAAF World Cross Country Championships in Edinburgh in late March. At the U.S. Olympic Team Trials in June, McGregor again narrowly missed qualifying for the Olympics in the 10000-meter run. She competed well, but her time of 32:29.82 only earned her another fourth-place finish in the event at the Trials. Unlike the 2004 trials, this time McGregor had already met the "A" standard. Amy Yoder Begley made a furious charge at the end of the race, which met the standard and therefore qualified her for the team over McGregor. In response to this disappointing outcome, McGregor said:

I felt like I failed myself in 2004. But this time I did what I needed to do, and Amy ran well. I tried to put a happy face on it. You don't want to be Debbie Downer and feel sorry for yourself. It's not like I'm the only person to finish fourth.

McGregor won USA 25 km Championships in May 2010 and then the USA 10-Mile Championships hosted at the Twin Cities Marathon in September, marking her sixth victory of the competition.

== Personal ==
McGregor resides in suburban Minneapolis and ran for Team USA Minnesota until 2012. She enjoys reading literature by authors such as Sylvia Plath and Cormac McCarthy. McGregor is also a big fan of Frank Sinatra.

== Achievements ==
- 2009 USATF 10 km Third
- 2007 USATF 25 km Champion
- 2006 USATF 10 km Champion
- 2005 USATF 10 km Champion
- 2005 USATF Outdoor Champion (10000-meter run)
- 2003–2008 U.S. World Cross Country team (8 km)
- 1999 Honda Sports Award for cross country
- 1999 Big Ten Conference Outdoor Track & Field Champion (5000-meter run)
- 1998 NCAA Cross Country Champion
- 1998 NCAA Indoor Track & Field Champion (3000-meter run, Distance Medley Relay)
- 1998 Big Ten Conference Cross Country Champion
- 1997 Big Ten Conference Cross Country Champion
