= Dhel Duncan-Busby =

Canadian gridiron football player (born 1999)

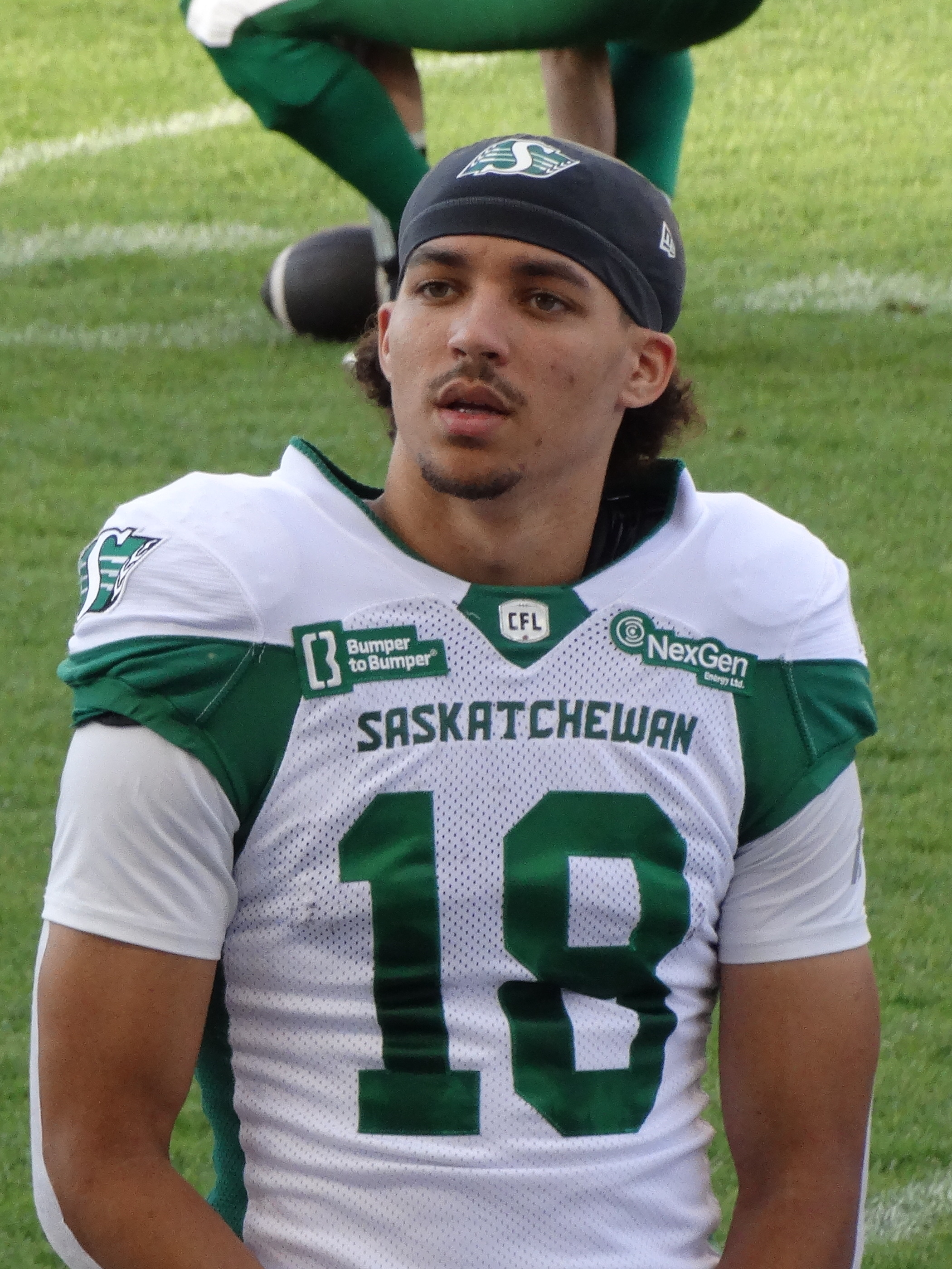
- Duncan-Busby with the Saskatchewan Roughriders in 2025

No. 18 – Saskatchewan Roughriders
- Position: Wide receiver
- Roster status: Active
- CFL status: National

Personal information
- Born: October 3, 1999 (age 27); Vancouver, British Columbia, Canada
- Listed height: 6 ft 1 in (1.85 m)
- Listed weight: 207 lb (94 kg)

Career information
- High school: Madison (Madison, Ohio, U.S.)
- College: Bemidji State
- CFL draft: 2024: 3rd round, 23rd overall pick

Career history
- Saskatchewan Roughriders (2024–present)

Awards and highlights
- Grey Cup champion (2025); First-team All-NSIC (2023)
- Stats at CFL.ca

Dhel Duncan-Busby (born October 3, 1999) is a Canadian professional football wide receiver for the Saskatchewan Roughriders of the Canadian Football League (CFL). He played college football at Bemidji State.

== Early life ==
Duncan-Busby was born in Vancouver, British Columbia. He played high school football at Madison High School in Madison, Ohio. Afterwards, he played one year at Midwestern Preparatory Academy.

== College career ==
Duncan-Busby played college football for the Bemidji State Beavers from 2019 to 2023. He was redshirted in 2018. He appeared in 10 games in 2019, catching 25 passes for 393 yards and three touchdowns. The 2020 season was cancelled due to the COVID-19 pandemic. Duncan-Busby played in 12 games, all starts, during the 2021 season, recording 49 receptions for 725 yards and five touchdowns. He started all 13 games in 2022, catching 48 passes for 896 yards and eight touchdowns, earning first team All-NSIC North honors. He appeared in 12 games in 2023, totaling 49 receptions for 825 yards and 11 touchdown, garnering first team All-NSIC and second team D2CCA All-Super Region 4 recognition.

== Professional career ==
Pre-draft measurables
Height	Weight	40-yard dash	20-yard shuttle	Three-cone drill	Vertical jump	Broad jump	Bench press
6 ft 1 1/4 in (1.86 m)	207 lb (94 kg)	4.56 s	4.40 s	7.02 s	33.5 in (0.85 m)	9 ft 8 in (2.95 m)	13 reps
All values from CFL Combine

Duncan-Busby was selected by the Saskatchewan Roughriders of the Canadian Football League (CFL) in the third round, with the 23rd overall pick, of the 2024 CFL draft. He officially signed with the team on May 6, 2024. He was moved to the 6-game injured list on June 1, and transferred to the practice roster on July 24. Duncan-Busby was promoted to the active roster on August 15, 2024.
