= Fairport Harding High School =

Public, coeducational high school in Fairport Harbor, Ohio, United States

Location
- 345 Vine Street; Fairport Harbor, (Lake County), Ohio 44077; United States
- Coordinates: 41°45′17″N 81°16′21″W

Information
- Type: Public, Coeducational high school
- Opened: 1876
- School district: Fairport Harbor Exempted Village Schools
- NCES School ID: 390453602190
- Principal: Dr. Steve Norris
- Teaching staff: 17.00 (on an FTE basis)
- Grades: 6–12
- Enrollment: 291 (2024–25)
- Student to teacher ratio: 17.12
- Colors: Maroon & white
- Athletics conference: Chagrin Valley Conference
- Team name: Skippers
- Website: https://www.fhevs.org/school-selection/ms-hs-harding

Fairport Harding High School is a public high school in Fairport Harbor, Ohio. It is the only high school in the Fairport Harbor Exempted Village School District. Athletic teams Skippers and compete as a member of the Ohio High School Athletic Association and is a member of the Chagrin Valley Conference.

== History ==
Opened in 1876, Fairport Harding High School serves students grades 9-12.

Fairport Harding High School was originally opened in 1876, where it was located on Third Street, it was a one room high school with just one teacher. In 1899, the board of education allowed Fairport Habor residents vote on the construction of a new school, which was opened in 1903 on Plum Street. The high school was later opened at its current location in 1921.

In 1924, the BOE renamed the high school after presidents who had died in office, the Plum Street location being named after the 25th U.S. President William McKinley, the old Third Street building being named after the 20th U.S. President James A. Garfield, and the Vine Street building being named after the 29th U.S. President Warren G. Harding.

The Fairport Harbor Exempted Village School District shuttered the Garfield, McKinley and Harding buildings, and returned to a new single building K-12 campus at the end of the 2025-26 Winter Break, located at 345 Vine Street.

== Athletics ==
Fairport Harding High School currently offers:

- Baseball
- Basketball
- Bowling
- Cheerleading
- Cross country
- Football
- Golf
- Softball
- Track and field
- Volleyball

=== State championships ===
- Boys track and field – 1964, 1965
- Girls bowling - 2018
