= The News-Herald (Ohio) =

Newspaper in Willoughby, Ohio, US

- Type: Daily newspaper
- Format: Broadsheet
- Owner: Digital First Media
- Publisher: Jeff Schell
- Editor: Tricia Ambrose
- Headquarters: 7085 Mentor Avenue; Willoughby, Ohio 44094; United States
- Website: News-Herald.com

The News-Herald is a newspaper distributed in the northeastern portion of Greater Cleveland, Ohio, United States, serving Lake and Geauga Counties as well as a section of eastern Cuyahoga County.

== History ==
The News-Herald began as the Willoughby Independent on April 18, 1879, was renamed Willoughby Republican in 1920, and became the Lake County News-Herald in 1935. Its offices moved from downtown Willoughby to 38879 Mentor Avenue (U.S. Route 20) in 1950, then to its current location, 7085 Mentor Avenue, adjacent to Mentor, after 1973. The News-Herald purchased the Lake County Telegraph of nearby Painesville, formerly the Painesville Telegraph, which was founded by Eber D. Howe, effective May 1, 1986, the latter merging with the former.
