= Madison High School (Madison, Ohio) =

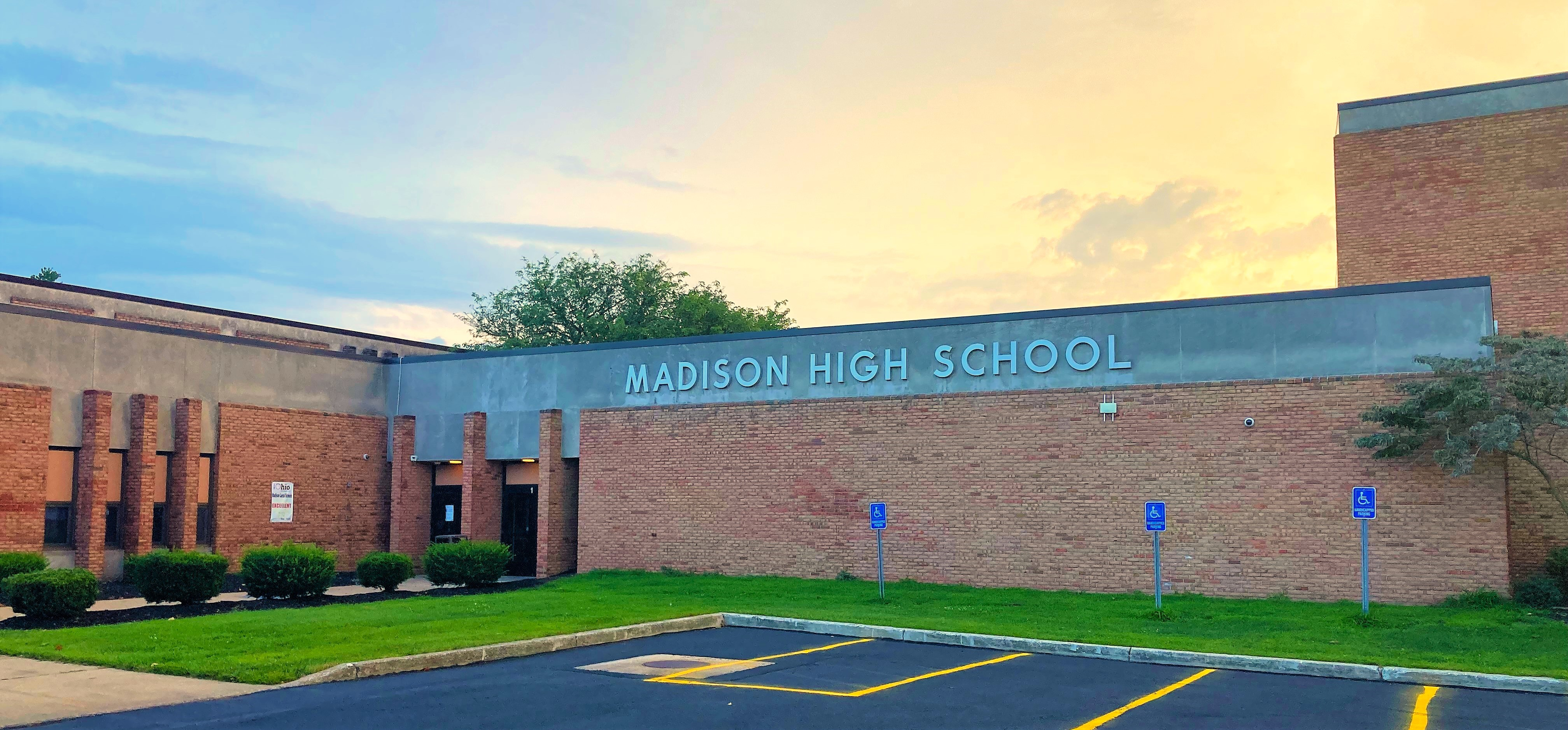
- Madison High School

Location
- 3100 Burns Road; Madison, Ohio 44057; United States; 41°47′25″N 81°4′4″W

Information
- Type: Public
- Motto: "Expect, Believe, Achieve...."
- Established: 1969
- School district: Madison Local School District
- NCES School ID: 390478803020
- Principal: Robert Knisely
- Teaching staff: 43.00 (FTE)
- Grades: 7–12
- Enrollment: 818 (2024–25)
  - Grade 9: 210
  - Grade 10: 177
  - Grade 11: 227
  - Grade 12: 204
- Average class size: 25
- Student to teacher ratio: 19.83
- Schedule type: Period Scheduling
- Colors: Blue and white
- Song: "MHS Alma Mater"
- Fight song: "MHS Fight Song"
- Athletics: Yes
- Athletics conference: Chagrin Valley Conference
- Mascot: Bolt
- Team name: Blue Streaks
- Rival: Perry Pirates
- Accreditation: Ohio Department of Education
- Yearbook: "The Cauldron"
- Website: highschool.madisonschools.net

Madison High School is a public high school located in Madison, Ohio, United States. The only high school in the Madison Local School District, it was established in 1969. Beginning in the 2026–27 school year, MHS now houses grades 7 and 8 as part of a district reorganization.

== Classes ==
Madison High offers a wide variety of classes to its students. Some of said classes are biology, chemistry, earth sciences, integrated math 1-4, algebras 1 & 2, geometry, calculus, wood shop, engineering classes, and many others.

== Extracurricular activities ==
The school offers many clubs and activities for students to take part in. Groups such as key club, technology club, drama club, National Honor Society, and many others are available to students.

Madison High School is a part of the Chagrin Valley Conference since the 2023–-24 academic year. Madison's main rivals are Perry, Geneva, Riverside, and Chardon High Schools. Madison currently offers many sports for both boys and girls. They include, for boys, golf, soccer, Cross Country, basketball, swimming, wrestling, baseball, football, track and field, tennis, and cheerleading.

== Notable alumni ==
- Dhel Duncan-Busby, professional football player in the Canadian Football League (CFL)
