= Lakeline, Ohio =

- Village
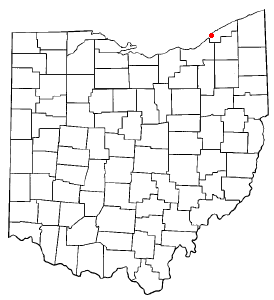
- Location of Lakeline, Ohio

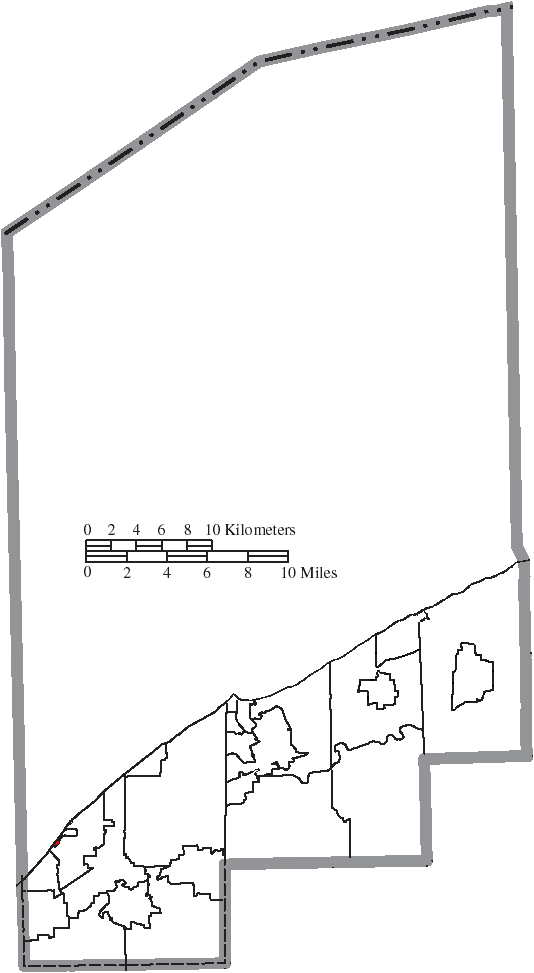
- Location of Lakeline in Lake County
- Coordinates: 41°39′31″N 81°27′14″W
- Country: United States
- State: Ohio
- County: Lake

Government
  - Mayor: Deborah Neale (D)

Area
  - Total: 0.089 sq mi (0.23 km^{2})
  - Land: 0.089 sq mi (0.23 km^{2})
  - Water: 0 sq mi (0.00 km^{2})
- Elevation: 620 ft (189 m)

Population (2020)
  - Total: 216
  - Density: 2,464.1/sq mi (951.41/km^{2})
- Time zone: UTC-5 (Eastern (EST))
  - Summer (DST): UTC-4 (EDT)
- ZIP code: 44095
- Area code: 440
- FIPS code: 39-41398
- GNIS feature ID: 1042388

Lakeline is a village in Lake County, Ohio, United States. The population was 216 at the 2020 census.

== Geography ==
Lakeline is located at 41°39′31″N 81°27′14″W (41.658646, -81.453818).

According to the United States Census Bureau, the village has a total area of 0.09 square miles (0.23 km^{2}), all land.

== Demographics ==
Historical population
Census	Pop.	Note	%±
1930	75		—
1940	77		2.7%
1950	183		137.7%
1960	269		47.0%
1970	223		−17.1%
1980	258		15.7%
1990	210		−18.6%
2000	165		−21.4%
2010	226		37.0%
2020	216		−4.4%
U.S. Decennial Census

=== 2010 census ===
As of the census of 2010, there were 226 people, 95 households, and 67 families living in the village. The population density was 2,511.1 inhabitants per square mile (969.5/km^{2}). There were 104 housing units at an average density of 1,155.6 per square mile (446.2/km^{2}). The racial makeup of the village was 97.8% White, 0.9% African American, and 1.3% from two or more races. Hispanic or Latino of any race were 0.9% of the population.

There were 95 households, of which 29.5% had children under the age of 18 living with them, 51.6% were married couples living together, 10.5% had a female householder with no husband present, 8.4% had a male householder with no wife present, and 29.5% were non-families. 27.4% of all households were made up of individuals, and 10.6% had someone living alone who was 65 years of age or older. The average household size was 2.38 and the average family size was 2.82.

The median age in the village was 45.1 years. 19.5% of residents were under the age of 18; 7.9% were between the ages of 18 and 24; 22.2% were from 25 to 44; 33.6% were from 45 to 64; and 16.8% were 65 years of age or older. The gender makeup of the village was 51.3% male and 48.7% female.

=== 2000 census ===
As of the census of 2000, there were 165 people, 66 households, and 41 families living in the village. The population density was 2,173.9 inhabitants per square mile (839.3/km^{2}). There were 70 housing units at an average density of 922.2 per square mile (356.1/km^{2}). The racial makeup of the village was 100.00% White. 24.6% were of Irish, 20.3% German, 9.4% Italian, 8.0% English and 5.1% Slovene ancestry according to Census 2000.

There were 66 households, out of which 27.3% had children under the age of 18 living with them, 48.5% were married couples living together, 7.6% had a female householder with no husband present, and 36.4% were non-families. 28.8% of all households were made up of individuals, and 12.1% had someone living alone who was 65 years of age or older. The average household size was 2.50 and the average family size was 3.12.

In the village, the population was spread out, with 23.6% under the age of 18, 4.8% from 18 to 24, 30.3% from 25 to 44, 22.4% from 45 to 64, and 18.8% who were 65 years of age or older. The median age was 41 years. For every 100 females there were 111.5 males. For every 100 females age 18 and over, there were 100.0 males.

The median income for a household in the village was $46,250, and the median income for a family was $50,000. Males had a median income of $35,833 versus $22,083 for females. The per capita income for the village was $17,218. None of the families and 5.0% of the population were living below the poverty line, including no under eighteens and 10.3% of those over 64.

== Education ==
It is in the Willoughby-Eastlake City School District.
