= Polaris Career Center =

Coordinates: 41°21′52″N 81°49′57″W

Polaris Career Center is a public career-technical school in Middleburg Heights, Ohio. It works in conjunction with the 11th and 12th grade students from the Berea, Brooklyn, Fairview Park, North Olmsted, Olmsted Falls, and Strongsville school districts. Polaris Career Center offers an opportunity that combines career training, academics and employability skills. Students can enter the job market after graduation or continue their education at a two-year or four-year college. Polaris opened in 1975 and is situated on 47 acres. Polaris completed a $57 million renovation of its entire Middleburg Heights campus in 2019. Polaris serves approximately 825 high school students at its Middleburg Heights campus and over 3,000 high school and middle school students at its satellite locations, as well as nearly 4,500 adults in open enrollment classes and Job & Career Training Programs.

The Polaris district newsletter, the COMPASS, is published once a year and contains articles about programs, services, and student accomplishments in the high school, satellite and adult education departments. Polaris also publishes a monthly district e-newsletter, the 411.

== Polaris Education Foundation ==
The Foundation is a non-profit 501 (c) (3) organization created for the specific purpose of promoting, improving and enriching the activities and programs at Polaris Career Center. The Foundation's support helps Polaris improve the quality of education it offers to the communities it serves. Since 1989, the Foundation has been helping high school students in need pay course fees and awarding scholarships for post-secondary education.

== Awards ==
Polaris has been named as a recipient of the Ohio Award for Excellence (OAE).
