= South High School (Willoughby, Ohio) =

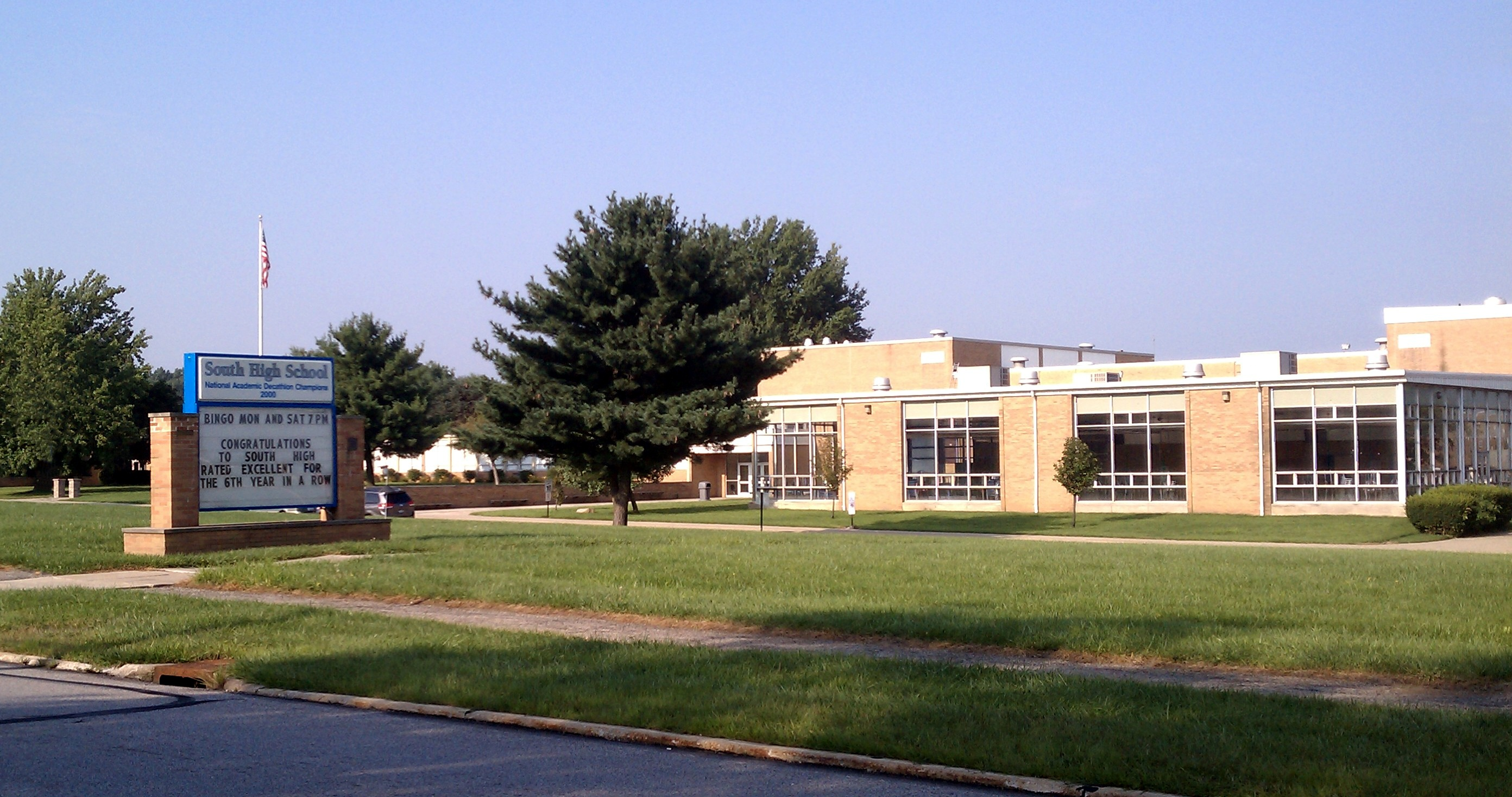

Location
- 4900 Shankland Road; Willoughby, (Lake County), Ohio 44094; United States; 41°37′30″N 81°25′14″W

Information
- Type: Public, Coeducational high school
- Opened: 1958
- School district: Willoughby-Eastlake City Schools
- Superintendent: Patrick Ward
- Principal: Andrew Suttell
- Teaching staff: 60.00 (FTE)
- Grades: 9-12
- Enrollment: 1,038 (2023–2024)
- Student to teacher ratio: 17.30
- Colors: Columbia Blue & Gray
- Athletics conference: Chagrin Valley Conference
- Team name: Rebels
- Accreditation: North Central Association of Colleges and Schools
- Website: School website

South High School is a public high school in Willoughby, Ohio. It is one of three high schools in the Willoughby-Eastlake City School District. Athletic teams are known as the Rebels and they compete as a member of the Ohio High School Athletic Association in the Chagrin Valley Conference.

== History ==
Opened in 1958 South High School serves students grades 9-12.

Willougby South High School formed following the dissolution of the former Willougby Union High School in 1958. Two high schools were born as a result, South High School and North High School

=== 2008 Shooting ===
On September 2, 2008, a student brought a gun to school and fired two rounds within the school, one piercing the ceiling, another shattering a trophy case. The student then put the gun to his head but was talked out of doing himself any harm by the Vice Principal of Willoughby South, Jeff Lyons.

== Accolades and awards ==
Willoughby South has been awarded the Blue Ribbon School award by the US Department of Education (the highest award attainable by American Schools), and both schools have competed in the Ohio Academic Decathlon competition multiple times.

== Athletics ==
South High School currently offers:

- Baseball
- Basketball
- Cheerleading
- Cross country
- Golf
- Football
- Ice hockey
- Lacrosse
- Softball
- Soccer
- Swimming
- Tennis
- Track and field
- Volleyball
- Wrestling

== Notable alumni ==
- Antoni Corone, actor, film director, producer.
- Laney Egbuka, soccer player
- Gregory J. Harbaugh, former NASA astronaut.
- Kareem Hunt, professional football in the National Football League (NFL).
- Michael Hutter, professional wrestler under the name Ethan Carter III.
- Katie McGregor, track, cross country and marathon runner.
- Betty Thomas, actress, film and television director.
- Dan Whalen former professional football player.
