= Willoughby, Ohio =

- City
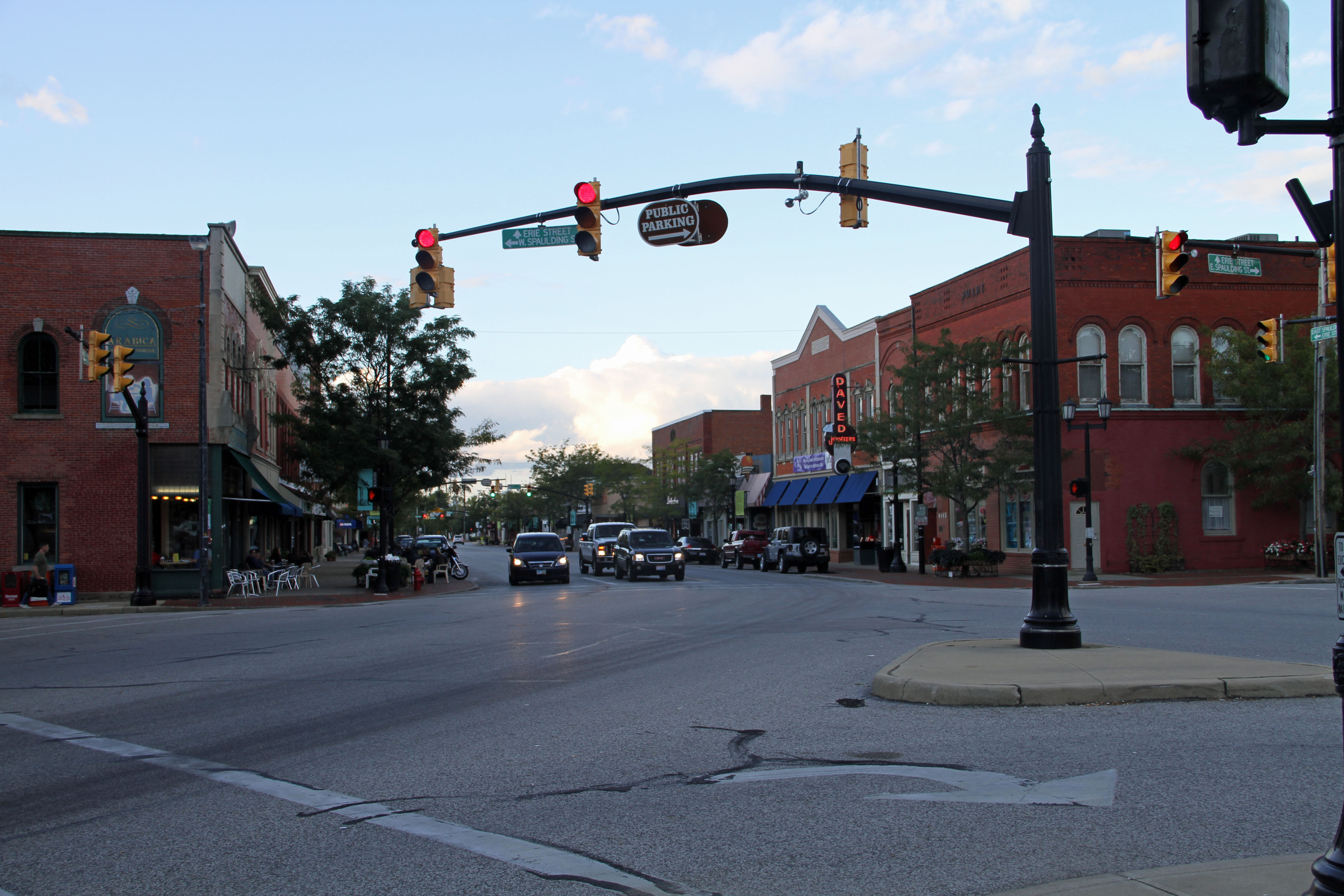
- Downtown Willoughby
- Motto: "The Courtesy City"
- Location in Greater Cleveland

- Location within Ohio Location within the United States
- Coordinates: 41°38′05″N 81°24′30″W
- Country: United States
- State: Ohio
- County: Lake

Government
  - Mayor: Robert Fiala (R)

Area
  - Total: 10.33 sq mi (26.75 km^{2})
  - Land: 10.24 sq mi (26.51 km^{2})
  - Water: 0.089 sq mi (0.23 km^{2})
- Elevation: 637 ft (194 m)

Population (2020)
  - Total: 23,959
  - Density: 2,340.3/sq mi (903.61/km^{2})
- Time zone: UTC-5 (Eastern (EST))
  - Summer (DST): UTC-4 (EDT)
- ZIP codes: 44094-44097
- Area code: 440
- FIPS code: 39-85484
- GNIS feature ID: 1086435
- Website: willoughbyohio.com

Willoughby is a city in Lake County, Ohio, United States, along the Chagrin River. The population was 23,959 at the time of the 2020 census. A suburb of Cleveland, it is part of the Cleveland metropolitan area.

== History ==
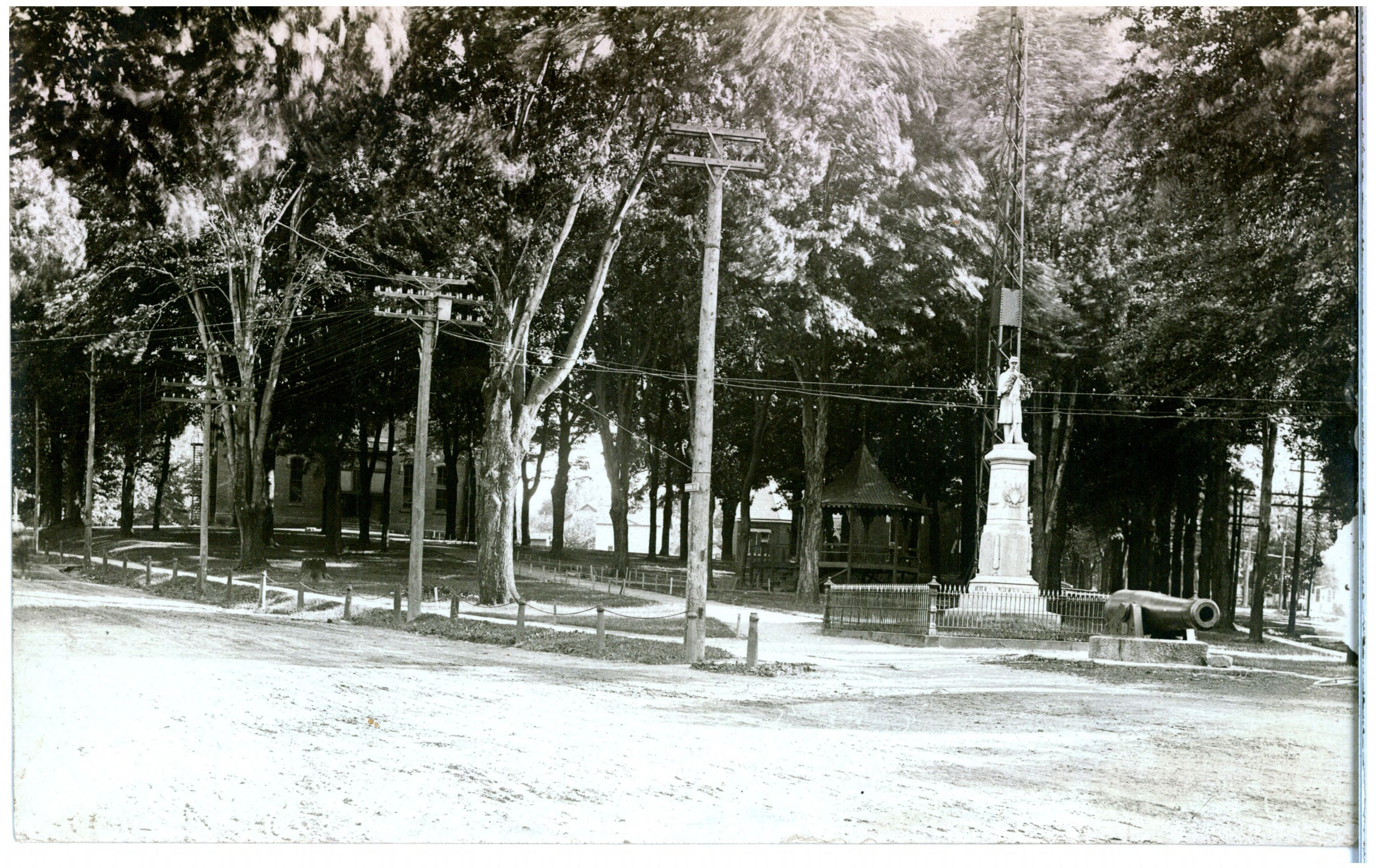
Town square of Willoughby, Ohio in 1908. Featuring the Civil War memorial, Dahlgren cannon, and bandstand in the background.

Willoughby's first permanent settler was David Abbott in 1798, who operated a gristmill. Abbott and his family were said to have had close relations with a band of Indians along the banks of the local river, which the Indians called the "Sha-ga-rin" meaning "Clear Water." This river was later called the Chagrin River, though the origin of the name remains in dispute.

In 1835, the village was permanently named "Willoughby" in honor of Westel Willoughby, Jr., a public health official that the founders of a short-lived Medical College, which was based in the city, hoped to attract to the area. Many historical buildings from this period survive to this date, affording the downtown Willoughby area some outstanding specimens of 19th century architecture.

In World War I, the U.S. Army chose Willoughby as the site for a chemical weapons plant producing lewisite.

Over time, Willoughby sent citizens into every major U.S. military conflict. Several memorials and historical relics are displayed in Wes Point Park, the center of downtown Willoughby, to honor those that have served.

Willoughby is the only town in America that has belonged, at one time or other, to six counties (Washington, Jefferson, Trumbull, Geauga, Cuyahoga, and Lake).

== Geography ==
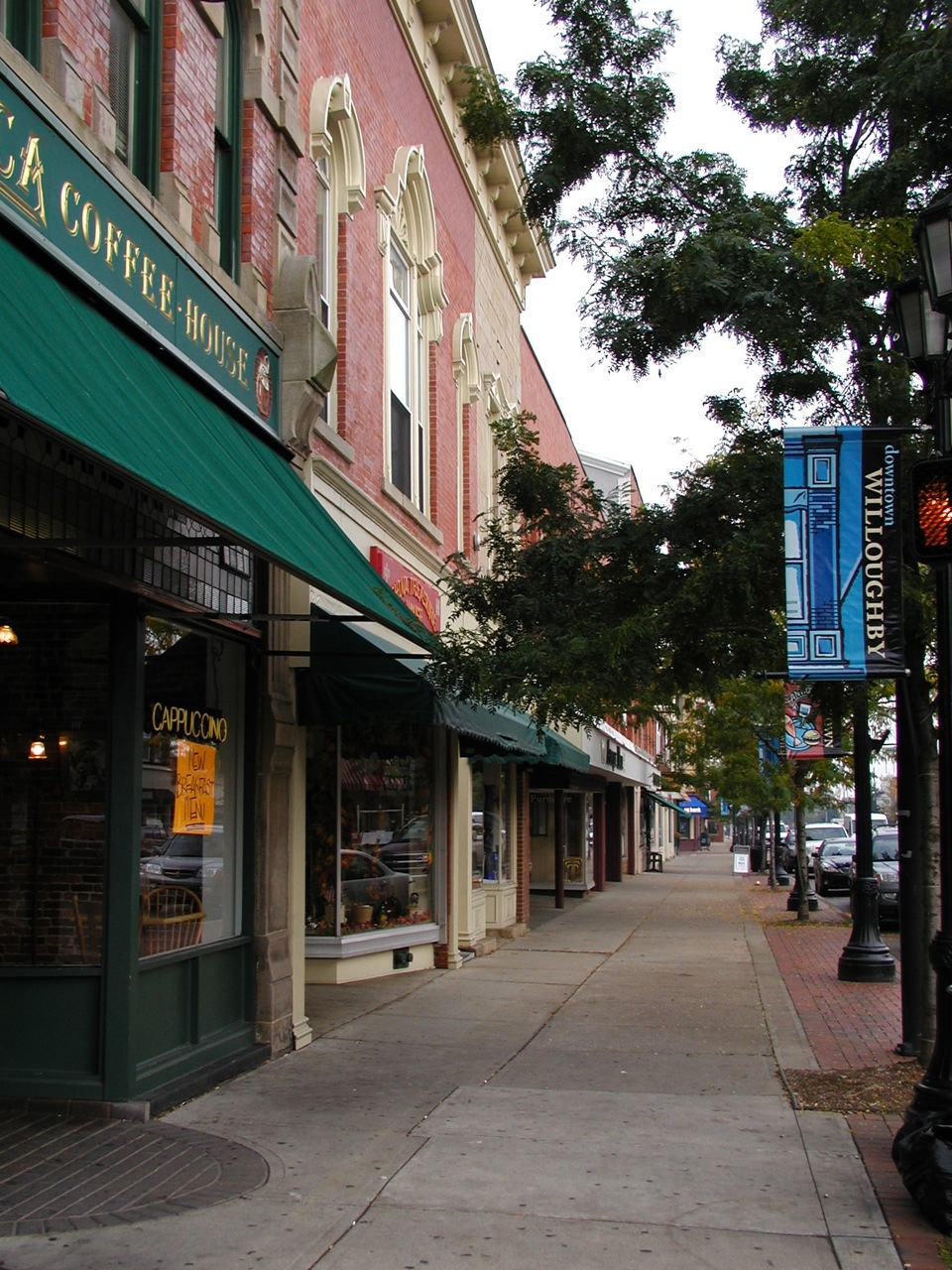
View north down Erie Street in downtown Willoughby

Willoughby is located at 41°38′45″N 81°24′35″W (41.645915, -81.408515).

According to the United States Census Bureau, the city has a total area of 10.34 square miles (26.78 km^{2}), of which 10.25 square miles (26.55 km^{2}) is land and 0.09 square miles (0.23 km^{2}) is water.

Willoughby is in an interesting geographical area. To the west is Cleveland, allowing for access to big businesses and a high neighboring population density. It is also close to more rural parts of northeast Ohio such as Waite Hill and Kirtland, two villages in Lake County Ohio with some of the highest residential values. It also has access to Mentor Ave, a long stretch of mostly commercial buildings spanning alongside the coast of Lake Erie.

== Government ==
Willoughby has a mayor-council system of government. As of 2024, the mayor is Robert Fiala, a Republican. The City Council consists of seven members, who are elected for two-year terms. One member is elected by the city at-large, and six members are elected from wards. As of 2024, the members of the City Council are as follows:

Willoughby City Council
Seat	Name	Party
Council-at-Large	Daniel J. Anderson	Republican
Ward 1	Kristie Sievers	Republican
Ward 2	Ken J. Kary	Unaffiliated
Ward 3	John Tomaselli	Unaffiliated
Ward 4	Robert E. Carr	Republican
Ward 5	Mike L. Merhar	Republican
Ward 6	Dan Garry	Republican

== Demographics ==
Historical population
Census	Pop.	Note	%±
1840	390		—
1860	589		—
1870	867		47.2%
1880	1,001		15.5%
1890	1,219		21.8%
1900	1,753		43.8%
1910	2,072		18.2%
1920	2,656		28.2%
1930	4,252		60.1%
1940	4,364		2.6%
1950	5,602		28.4%
1960	15,058		168.8%
1970	18,634		23.7%
1980	19,290		3.5%
1990	20,510		6.3%
2000	22,621		10.3%
2010	22,268		−1.6%
2020	23,959		7.6%
2025 (est.)	24,234		1.1%

=== 2020 census ===
As of the 2020 census, Willoughby had a population of 23,959. The median age was 44.6 years. 16.9% of residents were under the age of 18 and 22.8% of residents were 65 years of age or older. For every 100 females there were 88.0 males, and for every 100 females age 18 and over there were 85.4 males age 18 and over.

99.8% of residents lived in urban areas, while 0.2% lived in rural areas.

There were 11,630 households in Willoughby, of which 20.5% had children under the age of 18 living in them. Of all households, 35.5% were married-couple households, 21.6% were households with a male householder and no spouse or partner present, and 35.8% were households with a female householder and no spouse or partner present. About 41.2% of all households were made up of individuals and 18.5% had someone living alone who was 65 years of age or older.

There were 12,275 housing units, of which 5.3% were vacant. The homeowner vacancy rate was 1.4% and the rental vacancy rate was 4.9%.

Racial composition as of the 2020 census
Race	Number	Percent
White	20,504	85.6%
Black or African American	1,699	7.1%
American Indian and Alaska Native	34	0.1%
Asian	469	2.0%
Native Hawaiian and Other Pacific Islander	14	0.1%
Some other race	167	0.7%
Two or more races	1,072	4.5%
Hispanic or Latino (of any race)	531	2.2%

=== 2010 census ===
At the 2010 census there were 22,268 people in 10,413 households, including 5,716 families, in the city. The population density was 2,172.5 inhabitants per square mile (838.8/km^{2}). There were 11,387 housing units at an average density of 1,110.9 per square mile (428.9/km^{2}). The racial makeup of the city was 93.6% White, 3.1% African American, 0.1% Native American, 1.5% Asian, 0.2% from other races, and 1.5% from two or more races. Hispanic or Latino of any race were 1.3%.

Of the 10,413 households 23.7% had children under the age of 18 living with them, 39.1% were married couples living together, 11.7% had a female householder with no husband present, 4.1% had a male householder with no wife present, and 45.1% were non-families. 38.4% of households were one person and 16.2% were one person aged 65 or older. The average household size was 2.12 and the average family size was 2.83.

The median age was 43.6 years. 19.1% of residents were under the age of 18; 7.5% were between the ages of 18 and 24; 25.2% were from 25 to 44; 29.1% were from 45 to 64; and 19.1% were 65 or older. The gender makeup of the city was 46.8% male and 53.2% female.

=== 2000 census ===
At the 2000 census there were 22,621 people in 10,265 households, including 5,892 families, in the city. The population density was 2,225.3 inhabitants per square mile (859.2/km^{2}). There were 10,700 housing units at an average density of 1,052.6 per square mile (406.4/km^{2}). The racial makeup of the city was 96.47% White, 1.14% African American, 0.17% Native American, 1.15% Asian, 0.06% Pacific Islander, 0.11% from other races, and 0.90% from two or more races. Hispanic or Latino of any race were 0.71%. 19.0% were of German, 15.8% Italian, 13.3% Irish, 8.2% English, 5.6% Polish, 5.6% American and 5.4% Slovene ancestry according to Census 2000.

Of the 10,265 households 25.2% had children under the age of 18 living with them, 42.8% were married couples living together, 11.1% had a female householder with no husband present, and 42.6% were non-families. 36.6% of households were one person and 13.9% were one person aged 65 or older. The average household size was 2.17 and the average family size was 2.87.

The age distribution was 21.1% under the age of 18, 7.3% from 18 to 24, 31.5% from 25 to 44, 22.5% from 45 to 64, and 17.5% 65 or older. The median age was 39 years. For every 100 females, there were 85.4 males. For every 100 females age 18 and over, there were 81.9 males.

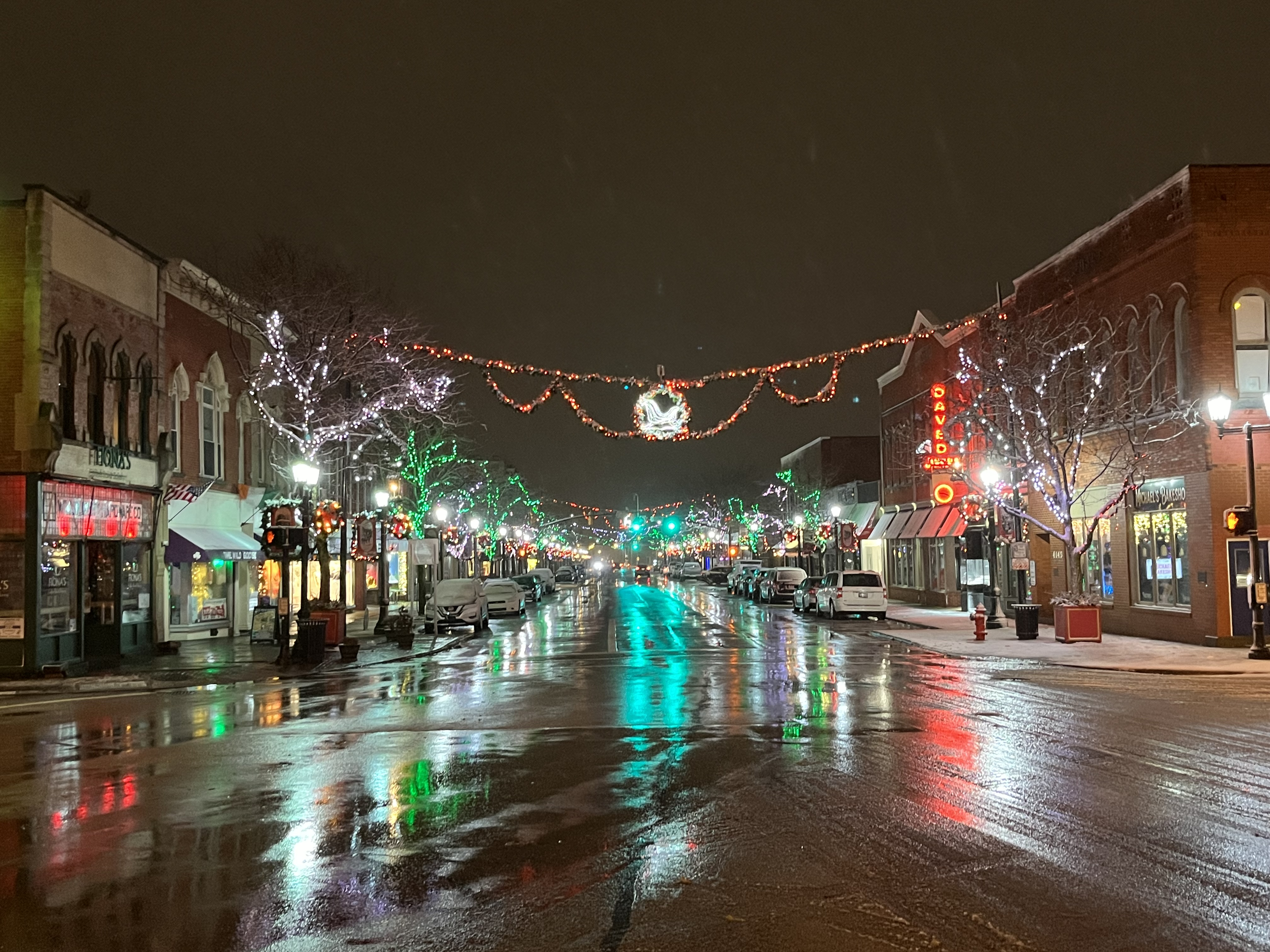
Downtown Willoughby, Ohio Looking North on U.S. Route 20 December 2023

The median household income was $43,387 and the median family income was $53,677. Males had a median income of $38,711 versus $30,553 for females. The per capita income for the city was $23,653. About 4.3% of families and 5.8% of the population were below the poverty line, including 8.4% of those under age 18 and 7.6% of those age 65 or over.

== Economy ==
According to the city's 2009 Comprehensive Annual Financial Report, the top employers in the city were:

#	Employer	# of employees
1	Lake Health	669
2	Willoughby-Eastlake City School District	458
3	Ohio Presbyterian Retirement Services	450
4	Momentive Performance Materials	377
5	Marous Brothers Construction	263
6	City of Willoughby	237
7	Windsor-Laurelwood	225
8	Deepwood Industries	205
9	Giant Eagle	180
10	Bescast	141

== Education ==
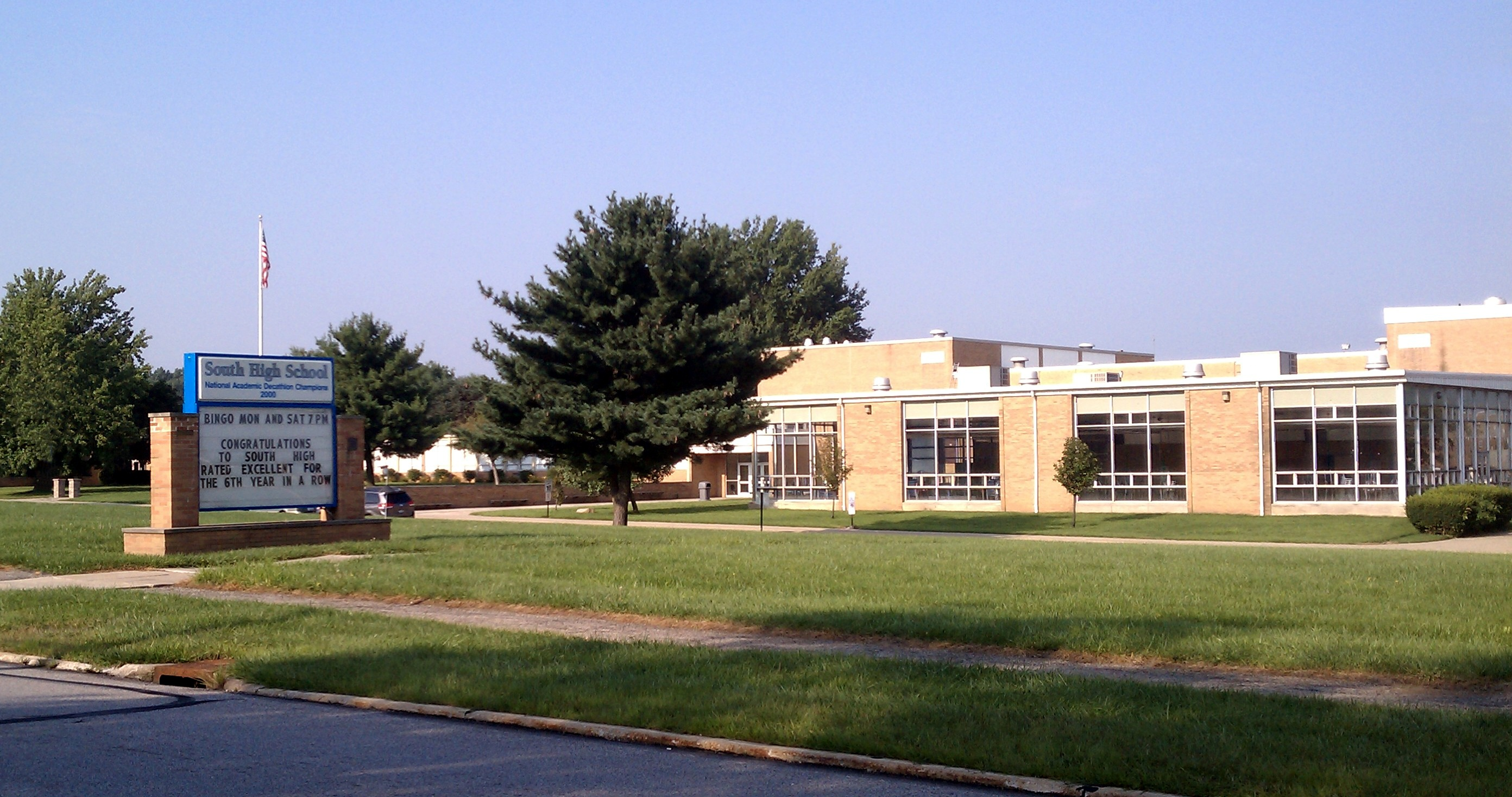
South High School

The majority of Willoughby is within the Willoughby-Eastlake School District. Two public high schools are located in Willoughby, Willoughby South High School and Willoughby-Eastlake Technical Center.

In 2017, the Willoughby South High School dropped its "Rebel" mascot—a man dressed in a gray Confederate military outfit—but kept the "Rebel" nickname.

South High School, which opened its doors at its present location in 2019. Previously, Willoughby South High School and current rival Eastlake North High were housed in the same building called Union High, but following the division, the then-abandoned Union High became the location of Willoughby Junior High School until 1972. It then housed the Willoughby-Eastlake Technical Center, located in downtown Willoughby.

In 2011, the proposed Five-Year Facilities Plan would add 2 new buildings to the district, a new Longfellow Elementary, a new Eastlake North High School, renovate Willoughby South High School, add a new school to the building as well as move Willoughby Middle School to the previous building. Construction for these buildings began in Fall 2016 and ended Fall 2019. The demolition of the old Willoughby Middle, Longfellow Elementary, and North High School began and ended Summer 2019.

A portion of the municipality is in the Kirtland Local School District.

The Andrews Osborne Academy, a private boarding school, is also located in Willoughby.

Willoughby is served by a branch of the Willoughby-Eastlake Public Library.

== Media ==
- The News-Herald, a Lake County newspaper, has been headquartered in Willoughby since its inception.
- WINT on AM 1330 is licensed to Willoughby and serves the surrounding area.

== Notable people ==
- Tim Conway, actor
- Ethan Carter III, professional wrestler
- James Emery, jazz musician
- Greg Harbaugh, NASA astronaut
- Kareem Hunt, professional football player
- Katie McGregor, athlete
- Ricky Stanzi, professional football player
- Lyn St. James, auto racer
- Betty Thomas, actress, director, writer
- Elizabeth Augustus Whitehead, archaeologist and philanthropist
- Evan Wright, writer
