= North High School (Eastlake, Ohio) =

Public, coeducational high school in Eastlake, Ohio, United States

Location
- 34041 Stevens Boulevard; Eastlake, (Lake County), Ohio 44095; United States; 41°39′4″N 81°26′46″W

Information
- Type: Public, Coeducational high school
- Opened: 1957
- Status: Open
- School district: Willoughby-Eastlake City Schools
- Superintendent: Patrick Ward
- Principal: Victor Puskas
- Teaching staff: 59.00 (FTE)
- Grades: 9-12
- Enrollment: 1,231 (2024-2025)
- Average class size: 25
- Student to teacher ratio: 20.86
- Colors: Orange and Black
- Fight song: "North High Fight Song"
- Athletics conference: Chagrin Valley Conference
- Mascot: Ranger Rick
- Team name: Rangers
- Accreditation: North Central Association of Colleges and Schools
- Newspaper: North Notes
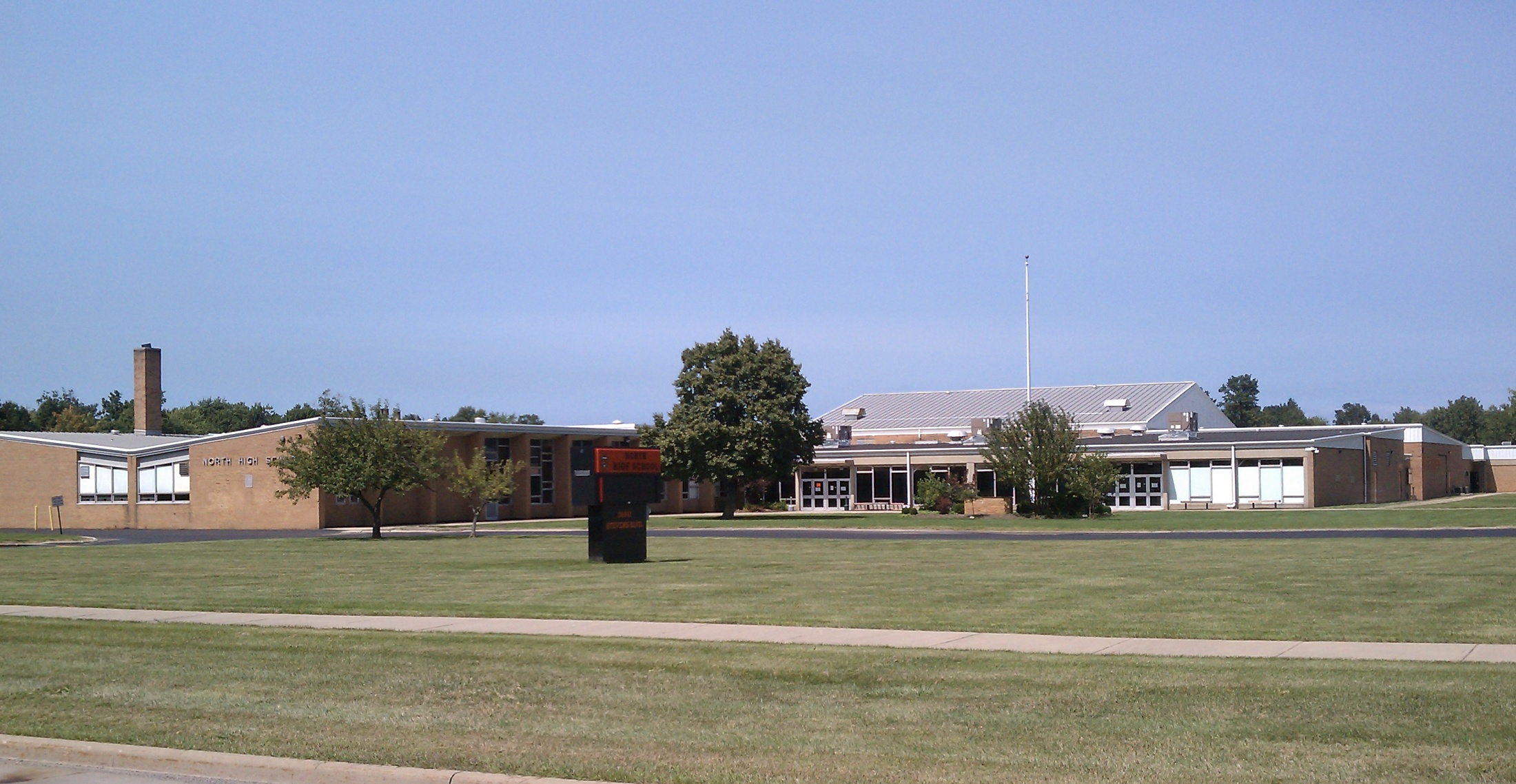

North High School is a public high school in Eastlake, Ohio. It is one of two high schools in the Willoughby-Eastlake City School District. The school was created when the Willoughby Union High School was split into North High School and South High School. At the beginning of the 2019 school year, North opened their new high school on the site of the former baseball fields and the old building was razed. The enrollment as of the 2021–2022 school year is 1,219 students.

== Athletics ==
Eastlake North is a member of the Ohio High School Athletic Association and part of the Chagrin Valley Conference.

== Notable alumni ==
- Tom Bukovac (Class of 1987) - Musician
- Lorraine Fende (Class of 1974) - County treasurer
- Jason Griffith (Class of 1999) - Actor
- Stipe Miocic (Class of 2000) - Professional mixed martial artist
- Dennis Wojtanowski (Class of 1968) - State representative
