= Eastlake, Ohio =

- City
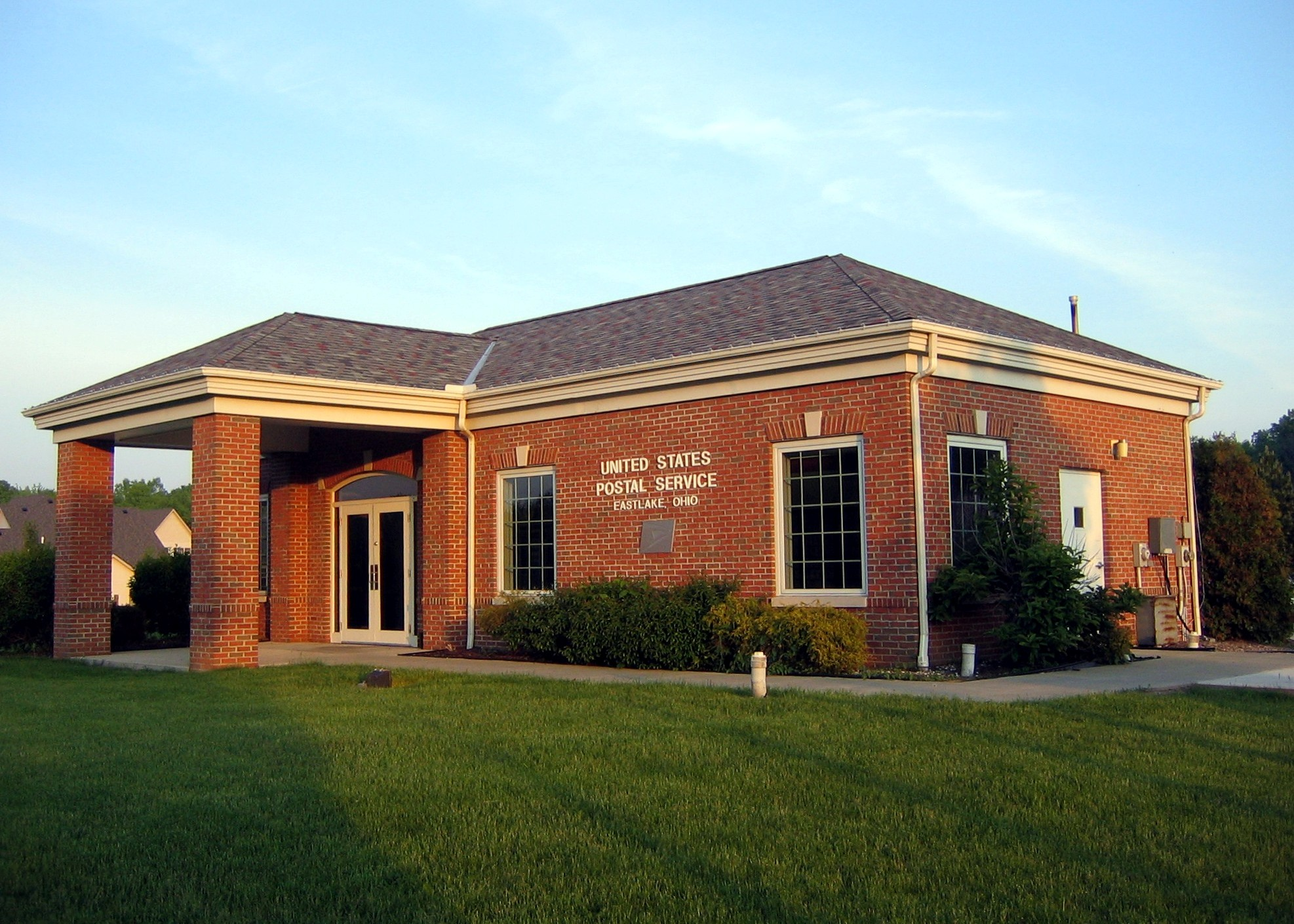
- Eastlake Post Office

- Location of Eastlake in Greater Cleveland

- Location within Ohio Location within the United States
- Coordinates: 41°38′30″N 81°26′17″W
- Country: United States
- State: Ohio
- County: Lake
- Incorporated: 1948

Government
  - Mayor: David Spotton (R)

Area
  - Total: 6.54 sq mi (16.93 km^{2})
  - Land: 6.41 sq mi (16.59 km^{2})
  - Water: 0.13 sq mi (0.34 km^{2})
- Elevation: 620 ft (190 m)

Population (2020)
  - Total: 17,670
  - Estimate (2023): 17,363
  - Density: 2,758.1/sq mi (1,064.91/km^{2})
- Time zone: UTC-5 (Eastern (EST))
  - Summer (DST): UTC-4 (EDT)
- ZIP codes: 44095, 44097
- Area code: 440
- FIPS code: 39-23618
- GNIS feature ID: 1086416
- Website: eastlakeohio.com

Eastlake is a city in Lake County, Ohio, United States. It takes its name from its location northeast of Cleveland, following along the shore of Lake Erie. The population was 17,670 at the 2020 census. The 2003 North America blackout stemmed from an Eastlake generating station going offline.

== History ==
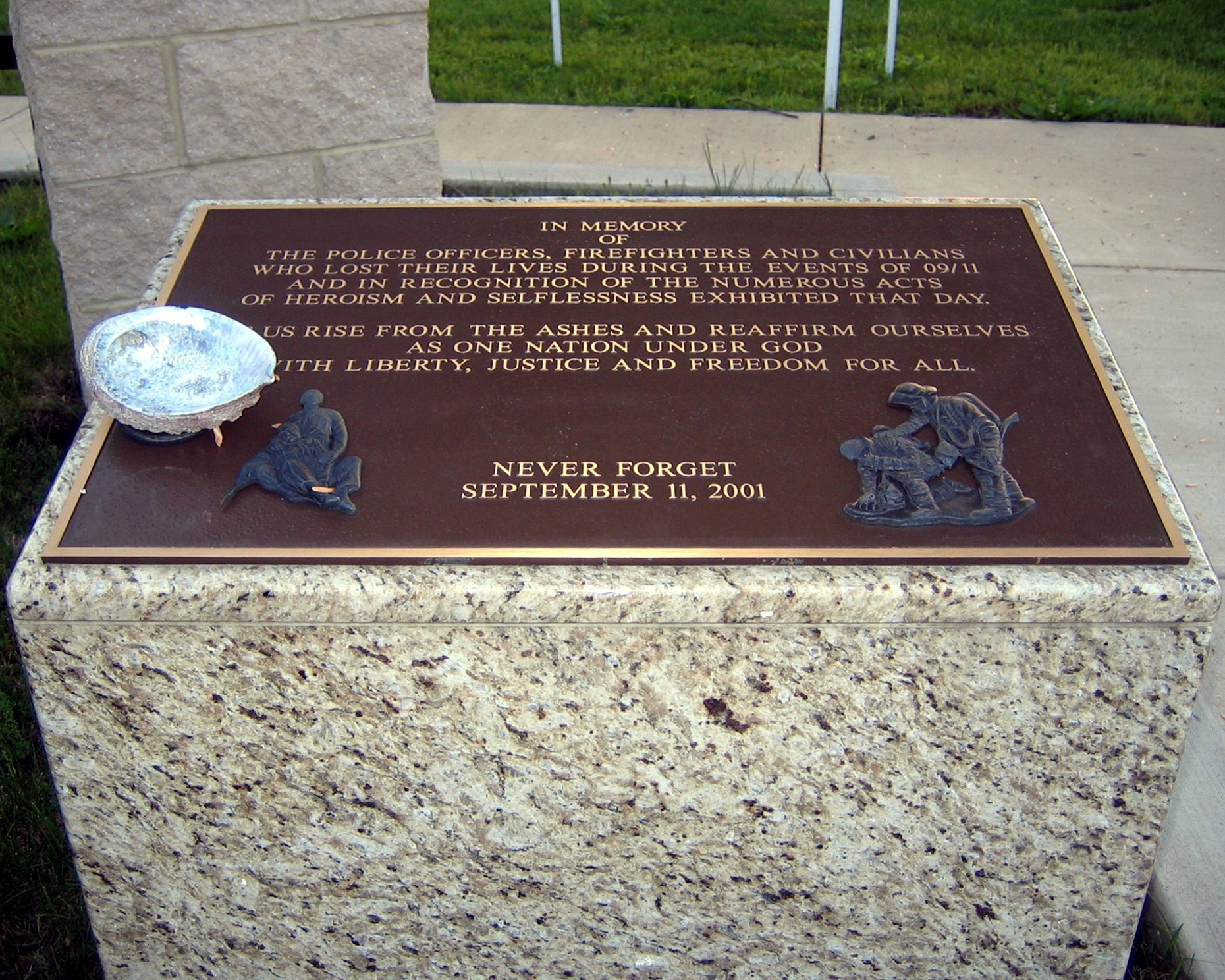
America Remembers 9/11 Memorial in Eastlake

The single largest blackout in North American history on August 14, 2003, was traced back to a FirstEnergy generating plant in Eastlake that went offline at 1:31 P.M. EDT amid high electrical demand. It caused 50 million people to lose power in eight U.S. states and southeastern Canada.

== Geography ==
According to the United States Census Bureau, the city has a total area of 6.53 square miles (16.91 km^{2}), of which 6.40 square miles (16.58 km^{2}) is land and 0.13 square miles (0.34 km^{2}) is water.

Eastlake is about 19 miles northeast of Cleveland, Ohio, along the shore of Lake Erie, and is part of Greater Cleveland.

== Demographics ==
94.3% spoke English and 2.9% spoke Croatian.

Historical population
Census	Pop.	Note	%±
1950	4,700		—
1960	12,467		165.3%
1970	19,690		57.9%
1980	21,954		11.5%
1990	21,161		−3.6%
2000	20,255		−4.3%
2010	18,577		−8.3%
2020	17,670		−4.9%
2023 (est.)	17,363		−1.7%

=== 2020 census ===
As of the 2020 census, Eastlake had a population of 17,670. The median age was 45.9 years. 17.5% of residents were under the age of 18 and 21.1% of residents were 65 years of age or older. For every 100 females there were 96.8 males, and for every 100 females age 18 and over there were 94.6 males age 18 and over.

100.0% of residents lived in urban areas, while 0.0% lived in rural areas.

There were 7,996 households in Eastlake, of which 22.6% had children under the age of 18 living in them. Of all households, 40.0% were married-couple households, 22.0% were households with a male householder and no spouse or partner present, and 29.4% were households with a female householder and no spouse or partner present. About 33.9% of all households were made up of individuals and 14.3% had someone living alone who was 65 years of age or older.

There were 8,391 housing units, of which 4.7% were vacant. The homeowner vacancy rate was 1.4% and the rental vacancy rate was 5.4%.

Racial composition as of the 2020 census
Race	Number	Percent
White	15,754	89.2%
Black or African American	651	3.7%
American Indian and Alaska Native	42	0.2%
Asian	160	0.9%
Native Hawaiian and Other Pacific Islander	1	0.0%
Some other race	97	0.5%
Two or more races	965	5.5%
Hispanic or Latino (of any race)	337	1.9%

=== 2010 census ===
As of the census of 2010, there were 18,577 people, 7,841 households, and 5,056 families residing in the city. The population density was 2,902.7 inhabitants per square mile (1,120.7/km^{2}). There were 8,280 housing units at an average density of 1,293.8 per square mile (499.5/km^{2}). The racial makeup of the city was 95.9% White, 1.4% African American, 0.1% Native American, 1.0% Asian, 0.3% from other races, and 1.2% from two or more races. Hispanic or Latino of any race were 1.4% of the population.

There were 7,841 households, of which 28.3% had children under the age of 18 living with them, 46.4% were married couples living together, 12.4% had a female householder with no husband present, 5.7% had a male householder with no wife present, and 35.5% were non-families. 29.7% of all households were made up of individuals, and 11.2% had someone living alone who was 65 years of age or older. The average household size was 2.37 and the average family size was 2.93.

The median age in the city was 42.7 years. 20.6% of residents were under the age of 18; 8.3% were between the ages of 18 and 24; 24.4% were from 25 to 44; 31.3% were from 45 to 64; and 15.4% were 65 years of age or older. The gender makeup of the city was 49.3% male and 50.7% female.

=== 2000 census ===
As of the census of 2000, there were 20,255 people, 8,055 households, and 5,557 families residing in the city. The population density was 3,166.5 inhabitants per square mile (1,222.6/km^{2}). There were 8,310 housing units at an average density of 1,299.1 per square mile (501.6/km^{2}). The racial makeup of the city was 97.44% White, 0.54% African American, 0.16% Native American, 0.97% Asian, 0.01% Pacific Islander, 0.15% from other races, and 0.73% from two or more races. Hispanic or Latino of any race were 0.70% of the population. 17.1% were of German, 16.4% Italian, 15.1% Irish, 7.5% Polish, 6.1% Slovene and 5.7% English ancestry according to Census 2000.

There were 8,055 households, out of which 30.6% had children under the age of 18 living with them, 53.3% were married couples living together, 11.4% had a female householder with no husband present, and 31.0% were non-families. 26.3% of all households were made up of individuals, and 9.3% had someone living alone who was 65 years of age or older. The average household size was 2.51 and the average family size was 3.07.

In the city the population was spread out, with 23.8% under the age of 18, 8.1% from 18 to 24, 30.3% from 25 to 44, 25.7% from 45 to 64, and 12.1% who were 65 years of age or older. The median age was 38 years. For every 100 females, there were 95.3 males. For every 100 females age 18 and over, there were 94.4 males.

The median income for a household in the city was $43,297, and the median income for a family was $52,039. Males had a median income of $37,557 versus $27,135 for females. The per capita income for the city was $19,905. About 3.7% of families and 5.0% of the population were below the poverty line, including 6.4% of those under age 18 and 6.2% of those age 65 or over.

== Government ==
Eastlake has a mayor-council system of government. As of 2024, the mayor is David Spotton, a Republican. The City Council consists of seven members, who are elected for four-year terms. Three members are elected by the city at-large, and four members are elected from wards. As of 2024, the members of the City Council are as follows:

Eastlake City Council
Seat	Name	Party
Council-at-Large	Chris A. Krajnyak	Republican
Council-at-Large	Angela Schmidt	Republican
Council-at-Large	Michael Semick	Republican
Ward 1	James Overstreet	Republican
Ward 2	John Meyers	Republican
Ward 3	Jason Kasunick	Democrat
Ward 4	Danyeill Kostelnik	Republican

== Culture ==
The Boulevard of 500 Flags, purported to be "the world's largest permanent display of American flags", is located in Eastlake.

Eastlake is served by a branch of the Willoughby-Eastlake Public Library.

== Sports ==
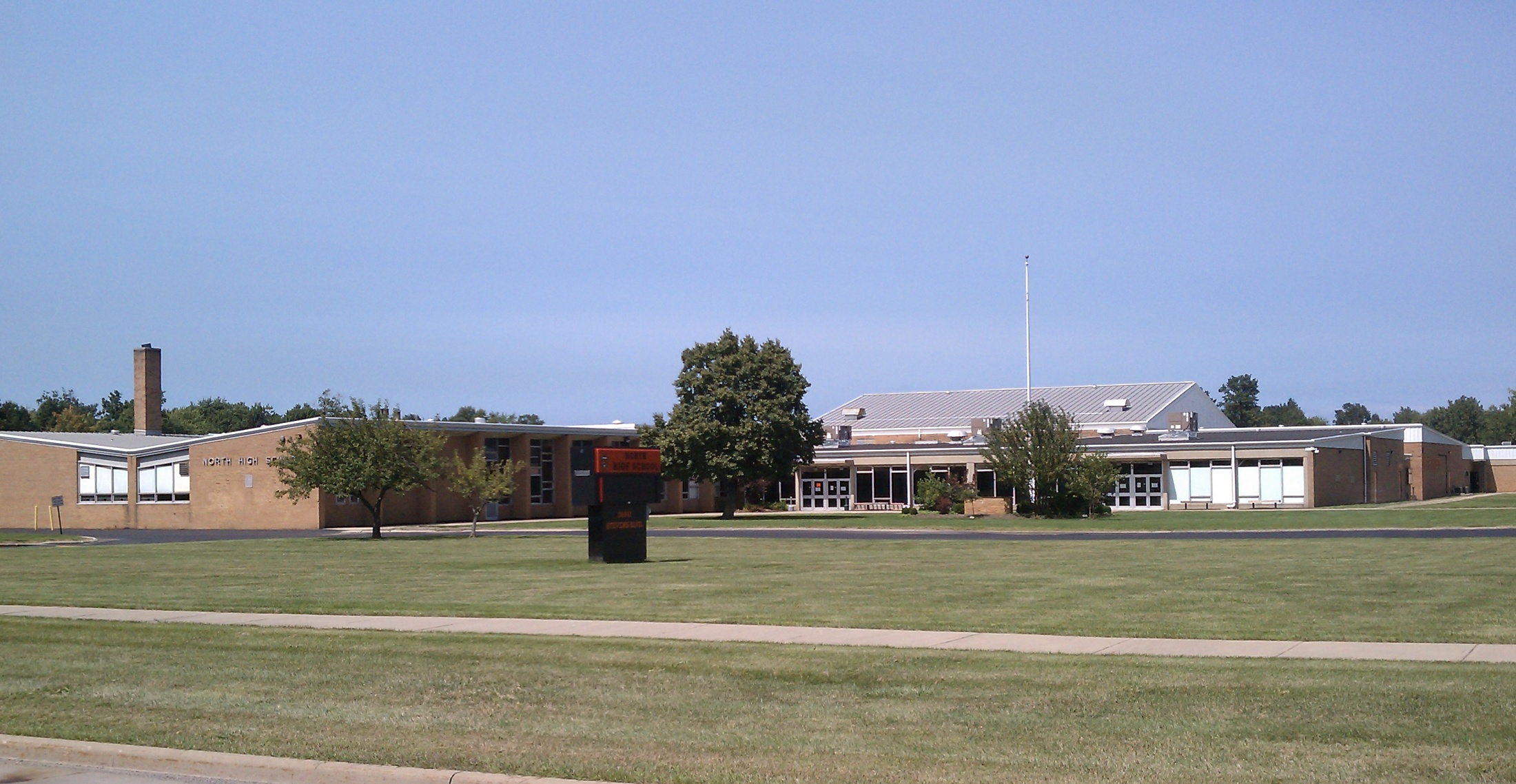
North High School

Eastlake is home to Classic Park, the home field of the Lake County Captains, a Class A minor league baseball team affiliated with the Cleveland Guardians. Classic Park's construction included controversy involving finances.

== Education ==
Eastlake is within the Willoughby-Eastlake City School District, which includes North and South high schools, three middle schools, and five elementary schools.

== Notable people ==
- Jason Griffith, voice actor
- Gary Heidnik, murderer and serial rapist
- Stipe Miocic, mixed martial artist
- Robert Ivan Nichols, identity thief
