= Mayfield City School District =

School district in Ohio

Mayfield City School District is a public school district in Cuyahoga County, Ohio. The district serves four communities in the Greater Cleveland area, which previously comprised Mayfield Township: Gates Mills, Highland Heights, Mayfield Heights, and Mayfield Village.

The district's six schools are Mayfield High School; Mayfield Middle School; and Center, Gates Mills, Lander and Millridge elementary schools. The district also operates consortium programs for students from neighboring school districts, including the Cuyahoga East Vocational Education Consortium (CEVEC) and Excel TECC, which provide occupational and technical training.
