= Mayfield High School (Ohio) =

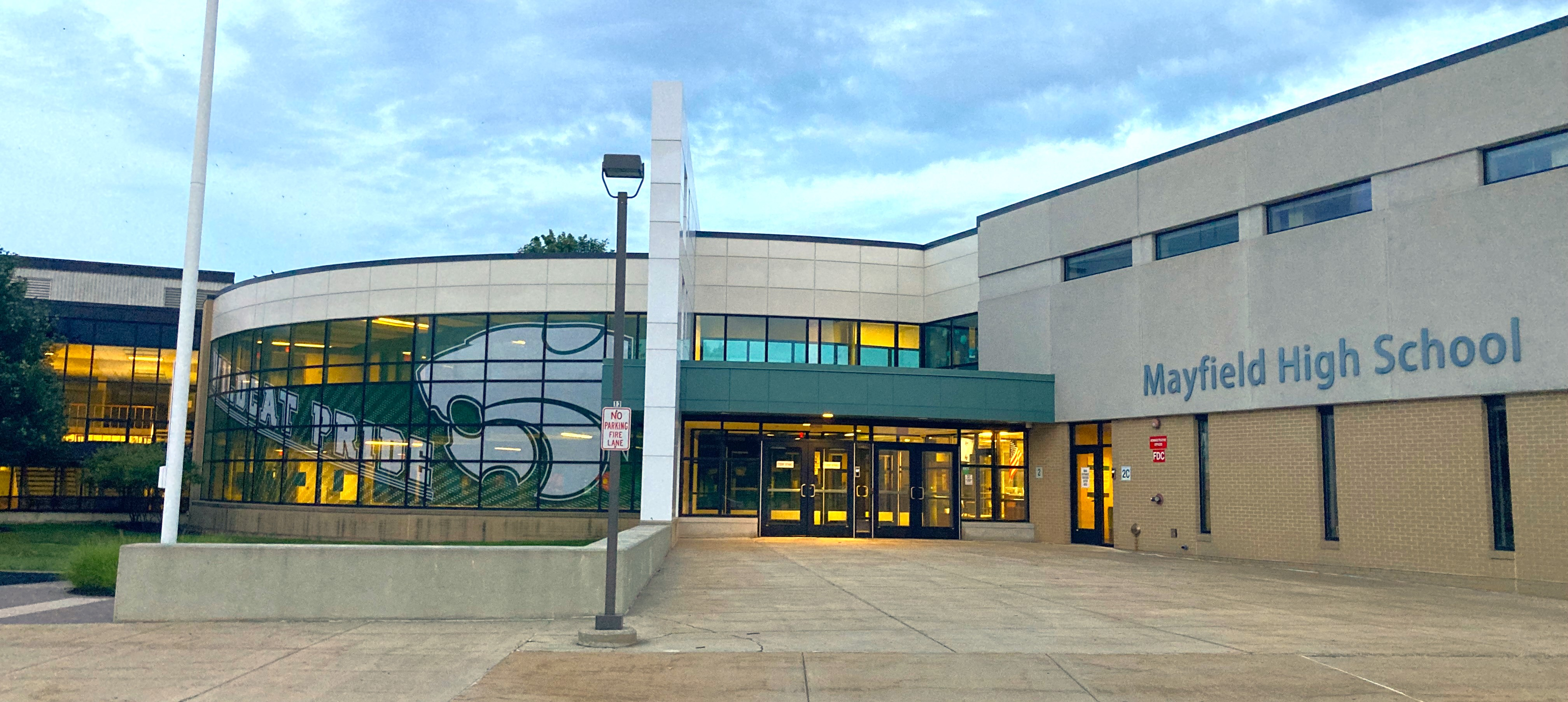

Location
- 6116 Wilson Mills Road; Mayfield, Ohio 44143; United States; 41°32′12″N 81°27′34″W

Information
- School type: Public
- Established: 1899
- School district: Mayfield City School District
- Principal: Brian Linn
- Staff: 80.00 (FTE)
- Grades: 9–12
- Student to teacher ratio: 19.68
- Language: English
- Campus size: 52 acres (21 ha)
- Campus type: Suburban
- Colors: Green and white
- Slogan: Every student, every day
- Fight song: On, Wisconsin!
- Athletics conference: Suburban League American
- Team name: Wildcats
- Rival: Brush Arcs, Solon Sleepers (Officially Solon Comets)
- Newspaper: The Paw Print
- Yearbook: The Mayfielder
- Communities served: Mayfield Heights, Mayfield Village, Highland Heights, Gates Mills
- Website: mayfieldschools.org/mayfieldhighschool_home.aspx

Mayfield High School is a public high school located in Mayfield, Ohio, an eastern suburb of Cleveland. It is part of the Mayfield City School District. The school educates about 1,000 students on its 52-acre (21 ha) campus. Mayfield High School provides students AP (advanced placement) classes, and many honors classes.

== History ==
The original school named Little Red School House was opened in 1899. It had a first graduating class in 1907. The school remained until 1924 because the city was expanding. Mayfield Central High School opened in 1924 which housed grade 9-12 until the population boomed in 1960 which overcrowded in Mayfield Central High School. A new Mayfield High school was in the process of constructing around the early 1960s. The Mayfield High School was opened to the students in 1963. Mayfield Central High School become Mayfield Middle School from 1963- 1984. Mayfield High School originally housed 9th-12th until in 1984. Mayfield Middle School housed only 7th grade for one year. Mayfield Middle School was closed in 1984 due to population decline. Mayfield High School housed all 7th grade-12th grade. In 1990, population was again expanding, then Mayfield Middle School reopened and housing 6th-8th grade. Mayfield High school now housing 9th-12th grades. The building for grades 8 and 9 opened in 1963, while one for grades 10, 11, and 12 opened in 1970. In 1972, the Excel TECC building was opened. The pool and field house was added in 1989 and the science wing was added in 1999. A multi-million-dollar renovation project began in 2011 and was completed in 2013.

== Areas served ==
Mayfield High School educates students from Gates Mills, Highland Heights, Mayfield Heights, and Mayfield Village, the four communities which comprise the Mayfield City School District.

== Academics ==
In addition to traditional course offerings, Mayfield High School offers classes in the Excel TECC (Technical Education Career Consortium) program. Excel TECC is a two-year program that offers students a hands on experience with real world career fields. Students can choose between a number of programs including: nursing, computer science, cosmetology, early childhood education, auto cad, graphic design, Construction, Horticulture, Fire and E.M.S classes, automotive, college courses, and many more. Excel TECC also allows students to earn college credits after completion. Students can enroll into the Excel TECC program from any school that is part of the program. Mayfield also provides students a variety of Advanced Placement, honors, and special education classes.

Mayfield also has offers unique art programs like the Art Docent program which helps educate K-3 students about different artists and art styles. Not only does Mayfield invest in its art program, but they also take pride in their music programs. Mayfield High School band also known as The Pride of Mayfield can be heard rehearsing their songs throughout the city of Mayfield on warm nights in the beginning of the school year.

Mayfield also offers numerous competitive clubs such as Speech and Debate, Mock Trial, Model UN, Science Olympiad, FIRST Robotics; and compete in competitions such as the AMC, USABO, Skills USA and more. Oftentimes, Mayfield Teams rank in the top 10% of most competitions. In total, the school has a total of 38 clubs, which often participate in public outreach in the community. The school also offers Student Council, National Honors, National Technical Honors, and Science National Honors societies for students.

== Athletics ==
As of the 2026-2027 school year, Mayfield High School is a member of the Suburban League, American Division. Previously, it was part of the Western Reserve Conference, which dissolved in 2026 and the Northeast Ohio Conference, which was dissolved following the 2014-2015 school year. The school offers nearly a dozen sports each for boys and girls. Sports offered at Mayfield High School include: baseball, football, soccer, swimming, golf, hockey, tennis, volleyball, basketball, bowling, cross country, cheerleading, wrestling, track, and fast pitch.

== Notable alumni ==
- Alina Baraz, singer/songwriter
- Elliot Bendoly, management researcher, OSU faculty member and dean
- Arthur T. Benjamin, mathematician and magician
- Glenn W. Frank, geologist
- Andy Isabella, professional football player
- Jodi Kest, women's college basketball coach
- Amit Majmudar, physician and Ohio's first poet laureate
- Carole Rendon, former United States Attorney for the Northern District of Ohio
- Mike Trivisonno, radio broadcaster
- Mark Manfredi, Major League Baseball player
