= Pete Johns (American football) =

American football player (born 1945–2014

No. 21
- Position: Safety

Personal information
- Born: August 14, 1945; Cleveland, Ohio, U.S.
- Died: August 21, 2014 (aged 69); New Kent County, Virginia, U.S.
- Listed height: 6 ft 2 in (1.88 m)
- Listed weight: 190 lb (86 kg)

Career information
- High school: Mayfield (Mayfield, Ohio)
- College: Tulane (1963–1967)
- AFL draft: 1967: 5th round, 111th overall pick

Career history
- Houston Oilers (1967–1969)

Career statistics
- Games played: 22
- Stats at Pro Football Reference

Peter Murray Johns (born August 14, 1945 – August 21, 2014) was an American professional football player who was a safety for the Houston Oilers of the American Football League (AFL). He played college football for the Tulane Green Wave.

== Early life ==
Johns was born on August 14, 1945, in Cleveland, Ohio. He attended Mayfield High School in Mayfield, Ohio.

== College career ==
Johns played college football for the Tulane Green Wave from 1963 to 1967 and was a three-year letterman from 1964 to 1967. He played at tailback and defensive back during his career with 538 rushing yards, one touchdown and 11 receptions for 86 yards.

== Professional career ==
Johns was selected in the fifth round, with the 111th overall selection, by the Houston Oilers in the 1967 AFL draft. On June 10, he signed his rookie contract with the team. Johns played 23 games over two seasons for the Oilers, including the 1967 AFL Championship Game, all at safety. He missed the 1969 season with a knee injury and was eventually released from the team.

== Personal life ==
After his playing career ended, Johns owned a horse farm in Texas and helped pass legislation to allow parimutuel betting in that state. He then moved to Virginia and helped secure a license for a horse racing track in New Kent County, named Colonial Downs, and opened a vineyard. Johns died on August 21, 2014.
