= Richmond Heights, Ohio =

- City
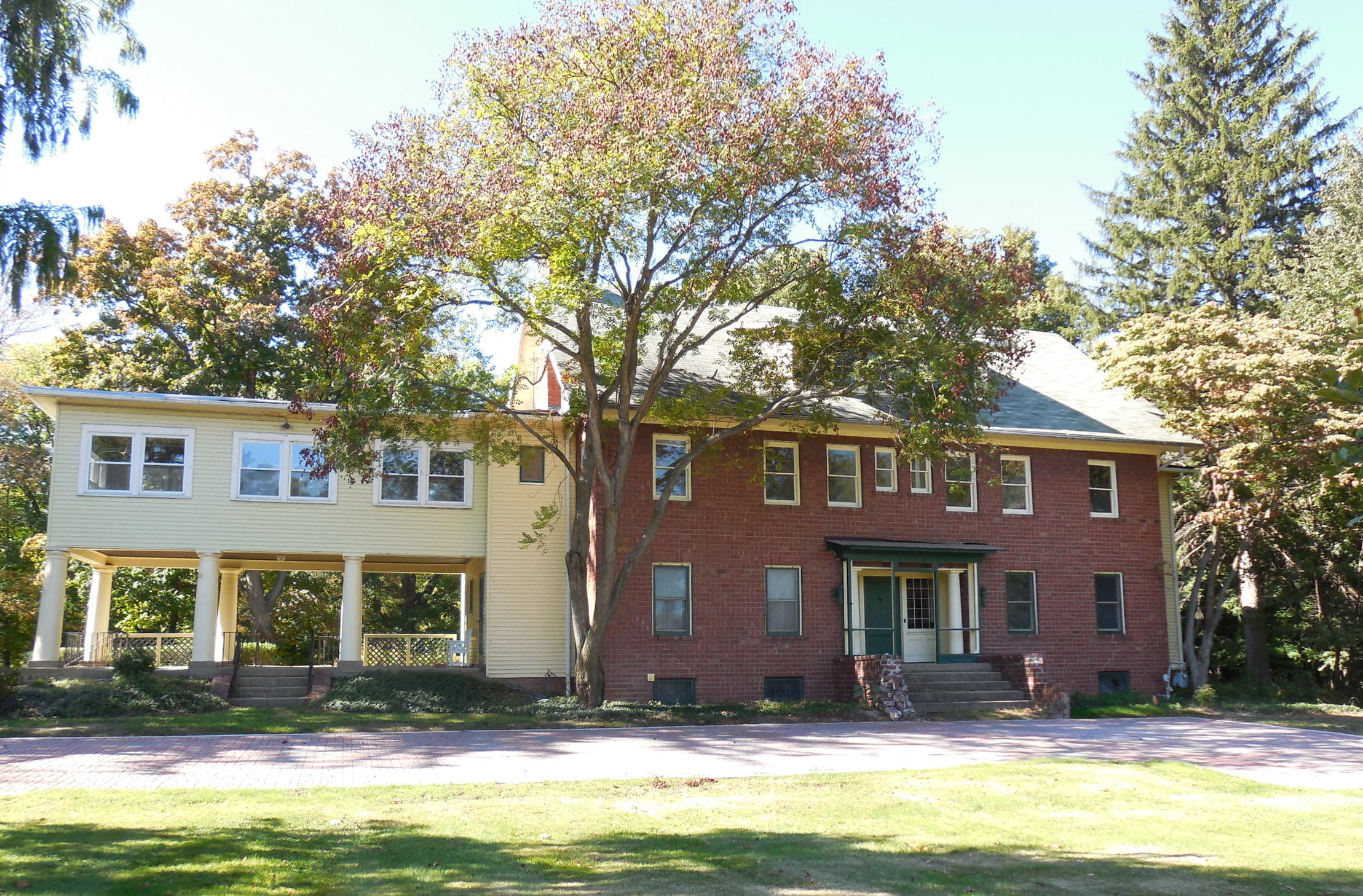
- Greenwood Farm

- Logo
- Motto: The City with a Brighter Tomorrow
- Interactive map of Richmond Heights, Ohio
- Location within Ohio Location within the United States
- Coordinates: 41°33′29″N 81°30′13″W
- Country: United States
- State: Ohio
- County: Cuyahoga
- Founded: 1917 (as Village of Claribel)
- Incorporated: 1918 (renamed to Richmond Heights)
- City Formed: 1960

Government
  - Mayor: Kim Thomas (D)

Area
  - Total: 4.44 sq mi (11.50 km^{2})
  - Land: 4.43 sq mi (11.48 km^{2})
  - Water: 0.0077 sq mi (0.02 km^{2})
- Elevation: 869 ft (265 m)

Population (2020)
  - Total: 10,801
  - Density: 2,437/sq mi (940.8/km^{2})
- Time zone: UTC-5 (EST)
  - Summer (DST): UTC-4 (EDT)
- ZIP code: 44143
- Area code: 216
- FIPS code: 39-66894
- GNIS feature ID: 1072241
- Website: www.richmondheightsohio.org

Richmond Heights is a city in Cuyahoga County, Ohio, United States. The population was 10,801 at the 2020 census. A suburb of Cleveland, it is part of the Cleveland metropolitan area.

== History ==
Originally a part of Euclid Township, Richmond Heights was founded as the Village of Claribel in 1917, but was later renamed as Richmond Heights in 1918.

== Geography ==
Richmond Heights is located at 41°33′29″N 81°30′13″W (41.558183, -81.503651). Richmond Heights borders Euclid on the west, Lyndhurst and South Euclid on the south, Highland Heights on the east, and Willoughby Hills to the north.

Some popular developments include the Richmond Bluffs, near the Cuyahoga County Airport, off Richmond Road, the Rushmore Subdivision, off of Highland Road, and Richwood, south of the Richmond-Highland Roads intersection. The largest residential area in Richmond Heights is the Scottish Highlands, off of Highland Road. Many ranch-style homes are found throughout the area. Many apartments are also located in Richmond Heights. Some major complexes are located throughout the Loganberry section of Richmond Heights (between Brush Road and Chestnut Lane on Chardon Road, or Route 6).

According to the United States Census Bureau, the city has a total area of 4.45 square miles (11.53 km^{2}), of which 4.44 square miles (11.50 km^{2}) is land and 0.01 square miles (0.03 km^{2}) is water.

== Demographics ==
Historical population
Census	Pop.	Note	%±
1920	265		—
1930	418		57.7%
1940	507		21.3%
1950	891		75.7%
1960	5,068		468.8%
1970	9,220		81.9%
1980	10,095		9.5%
1990	9,611		−4.8%
2000	10,944		13.9%
2010	10,546		−3.6%
2020	10,801		2.4%
2025 (est.)	10,475		−3.0%

82.7% spoke English, 4.8% Russian, 3.1% Spanish, 1.9% Slovene, 1.7% Italian, 1.2% Chinese, and 1.1% Croatian.

Of the city's population over the age of 25, 38.5% held a bachelor's degree or higher.

=== Racial and ethnic composition ===
Richmond Heights city, Ohio – Racial and ethnic composition Note: the US Census treats Hispanic/Latino as an ethnic category. This table excludes Latinos from the racial categories and assigns them to a separate category. Hispanics/Latinos may be of any race.
Race / Ethnicity (NH = Non-Hispanic)	Pop 2000	Pop 2010	Pop 2020	% 2000	% 2010	% 2020
White alone (NH)	7,472	5,012	3,474	68.27%	47.53%	32.16%
Black or African American alone (NH)	2,582	4,693	6,361	23.59%	44.50%	58.89%
Native American or Alaska Native alone (NH)	6	4	7	0.05%	0.04%	0.06%
Asian alone (NH)	513	449	343	4.69%	4.26%	3.18%
Native Hawaiian or Pacific Islander alone (NH)	4	2	1	0.04%	0.02%	0.01%
Other race alone (NH)	21	21	47	0.19%	0.20%	0.44%
Mixed race or Multiracial (NH)	173	176	310	1.58%	1.67%	2.87%
Hispanic or Latino (any race)	173	189	258	1.58%	1.79%	2.39%
Total	10,944	10,546	10,801	100.00%	100.00%	100.00%

=== 2020 census ===
As of the 2020 census, Richmond Heights had a population of 10,801. The median age was 49.2 years. 16.0% of residents were under the age of 18 and 25.6% of residents were 65 years of age or older. For every 100 females there were 82.3 males, and for every 100 females age 18 and over there were 80.1 males age 18 and over.

100.0% of residents lived in urban areas, while 0.0% lived in rural areas.

There were 4,824 households in Richmond Heights, of which 21.3% had children under the age of 18 living in them. Of all households, 36.5% were married-couple households, 20.3% were households with a male householder and no spouse or partner present, and 37.3% were households with a female householder and no spouse or partner present. About 36.9% of all households were made up of individuals and 14.5% had someone living alone who was 65 years of age or older.

There were 5,443 housing units, of which 11.4% were vacant. The homeowner vacancy rate was 2.1% and the rental vacancy rate was 15.2%.

Racial composition as of the 2020 census
Race	Number	Percent
White	3,527	32.7%
Black or African American	6,395	59.2%
American Indian and Alaska Native	10	0.1%
Asian	347	3.2%
Native Hawaiian and Other Pacific Islander	2	0.0%
Some other race	91	0.8%
Two or more races	429	4.0%
Hispanic or Latino (of any race)	258	2.4%

=== 2010 census ===
As of the census of 2010, there were 10,546 people, 4,766 households, and 2,812 families living in the city. The population density was 2,375.2 inhabitants per square mile (917.1/km^{2}). There were 5,370 housing units at an average density of 1,209.5 per square mile (467.0/km^{2}). The racial makeup of the city was 48.5% White, 44.9% African American, 0.1% Native American, 4.3% Asian, 0.5% from other races, and 1.8% from two or more races. Hispanic or Latino of any race were 1.8% of the population.

There were 4,766 households, of which 23.7% had children under the age of 18 living with them, 40.6% were married couples living together, 14.8% had a female householder with no husband present, 3.7% had a male householder with no wife present, and 41.0% were non-families. 36.4% of all households were made up of individuals, and 13.8% had someone living alone who was 65 years of age or older. The average household size was 2.17 and the average family size was 2.84.

The median age in the city was 46.1 years. 18.4% of residents were under the age of 18; 7.9% were between the ages of 18 and 24; 22% were from 25 to 44; 31% were from 45 to 64; and 20.5% were 65 years of age or older. The gender makeup of the city was 44.9% male and 55.1% female.

=== 2000 census ===
As of the census of 2000, there were 10,944 people, 4,864 households, and 2,971 families living in the city. The population density was 2,504.4 inhabitants per square mile (967.0/km^{2}). There were 5,060 housing units at an average density of 1,157.9 per square mile (447.1/km^{2}). The racial makeup of the city was 68.98% White, 23.87% Black, 0.05% Native American, 4.74% Asian, 0.04% Pacific Islander, 0.65% from other races, and 1.67% from two or more races. Hispanic or Latino of any race were 1.58% of the population.

There were 4,864 households, out of which 24.1% had children under the age of 18 living with them, 45.7% were married couples living together, 12.3% had a female householder with no husband present, and 38.9% were non-families. 33.9% of all households were made up of individuals, and 10.0% had someone living alone who was 65 years of age or older. The average household size was 2.22 and the average family size was 2.85.

In the city the population was spread out, with 19.7% under the age of 18, 7.7% from 18 to 24, 29.6% from 25 to 44, 25.3% from 45 to 64, and 17.7% who were 65 years of age or older. The median age was 41 years. For every 100 females, there were 89.4 males. For every 100 females age 18 and over, there were 85.3 males.

The median income for a household in the city was $43,625, and the median income for a family was $60,136. Males had a median income of $40,414 versus $30,537 for females. The per capita income for the city was $25,738. About 4.3% of families and 5.3% of the population were below the poverty line, including 6.9% of those under age 18 and 2.7% of those age 65 or over.

== Education ==
Richmond Heights has a local school district. Richmond Heights High School has a total enrollment of 335 students, with 58% of students of African American descent, 36% Caucasian, 3% Asian American, 2% multiracial, and 1% Hispanic. The mascot is the Spartans and the colors are stated officially as royal blue and white. As of recently, the Richmond Heights Schools had been struggling to pass levies on the school, thus leading to strike from teachers of the schools, demanding more pay, and loss of transportation, bands, and now a "pay-to-play" situation in all sports.

Richmond Heights recently did pass a levy in 2009 that will provide the school with more tax dollars from the city, thus bringing back possible transportation for the students.

== See also ==
- Richmond Town Square
