= ICN =

ICN may refer to:

== Organizations ==
- ICN Pharmaceuticals or ICN Radiochemicals, now Valeant Pharmaceuticals, a Canadian multinational
- ICN Radio, an Italian-language radio in New York City
- Information Communications Network LLC, a company in Mongolia
- Inside Climate News, American news organization
- International Code of Nomenclature for algae, fungi, and plants, code of scientific nomenclature
- International Competition Network a regulators association
- International Council of Nurses, a federation of national nursing associations
- Iowa Communications Network, an Iowa state agency

=== Educational institutes ===
- ICN Graduate Business School, a French graduate business school in Nancy
- UCL Institute of Cognitive Neuroscience, a group of physicians and scientists at University College London

== Computing and communication technology ==
- iCN GPS, a range of GPS navigation products from Navman
- Illinois Century Network, an operation by the Illinois Department of Central Management Services
- Information-centric networking
- Integrated Computing Network, maintained by the Los Alamos National Laboratory

== History ==
- Imperial Chinese Navy, a navy of China from 1875 until the end of Qing Empire in 1912

== Shipyards ==
- Itaguaí Construções Navais, a Brazilian state-owned shipyard also known as ICN

== Science and medicine ==
- Inclusion conjunctivitis of the newborn, in medicine
- Intensive care nursery, alternative name for Neonatal intensive care unit
- International Code of Nomenclature for algae, fungi, and plants, in algology, mycology, and botany
- Iodine cyanide, a pseudohalogen with formula ICN or CNI

== Transportation ==
- ICN (SBB-CFF-FFS), a Swiss intercity tilting passenger train
- Incheon International Airport, near Seoul, South Korea (by IATA airport code)
- InterCity Nagibni, or RegioSwinger, a Croatian tilting diesel passenger train

== Other ==
- Indigenous Corporation Number, as registered by the Office of the Registrar of Indigenous Corporations in Australia
- International Communications Network, former name of now-defunct National Broadcasting Network (Trinidad and Tobago)
