= America Oggi =

Italian-language newspaper and news agency in the United States

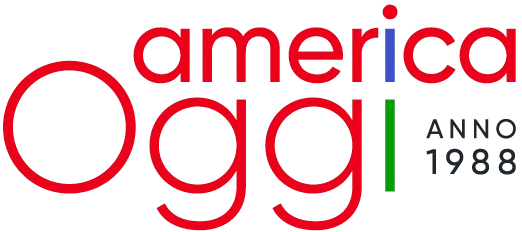

- America Oggi (18 December 2017)
- Type: Daily newspaper (1988–2025); Digital news agency (2026–present)
- Format: Tabloid
- Owner(s): Gruppo Editoriale Oggi (1988–2025); VNY Media Corp. (2025–present)
- Founded: 1988 (as newspaper); 2026 (relaunched as news agency)
- Headquarters: 112 East 71st Street, Manhattan, New York
- Website: lavocedinewyork.com/america-oggi/

America Oggi (Italian for "America Today") is a bilingual, Italian- and English-language news agency based on the Upper East Side of Manhattan, New York City. It began in 1988 as an Italian-language daily newspaper published in Norwood, New Jersey, for Italian immigrants in the United States, founded by journalists of the closed Il Progresso Italo-Americano.

The newspaper was acquired by VNY Media Corp. in 2025 and relaunched the following year as America Oggi News Agency, operating alongside VNY Media's other outlets, La Voce di New York and ICN Radio.

== History ==
The newspaper's origins lie in the historic Italian-language daily Il Progresso Italo-Americano. When Il Progresso dismissed its unionized staff in 1988, some of those journalists founded a new paper with their own resources. America Oggi began publishing on November 14, 1988, and became the only Italian-language daily in the United States the following spring, after Il Progresso itself ceased publication.

Ownership remained with 20 of the paper's founding shareholders through Gruppo Editoriale Oggi Inc., based in Norwood, New Jersey. Andrea Mantineo served as president of the publishing group and editor-in-chief of the newspaper. In 2008, America Oggi relocated its offices to 475 Walnut Street in Norwood.

In May 2022, New York-based North Sixth Group purchased the global licensing rights to America Oggi and integrated it into America Domani, or America Tomorrow, a digital media community for Italian Americans, with publishing industry executive Al DiGuido named Publisher & CEO.

On June 18, 2025, America Oggi was acquired by VNY Media Corp., the New York-based publisher of La Voce di New York, together with the Italian-American radio station ICN Radio (Italian Communication Network), which had been broadcasting to the Italian-American community for roughly four decades.

On March 17, 2026, the outlet was relaunched as America Oggi News Agency, a bilingual digital news service covering business, culture and topics related to the Italian and Italian-American community, operating alongside La Voce di New York and ICN Radio within VNY Media Corp.

== See also ==
- La Voce di New York
- ICN Radio
- Italian language in the United States
