= Barbara Roads =

American labor activist and flight attendant (1928–2023)

Barbara "Dusty" Roads
- Born: April 9, 1928; Cleveland, Ohio, U.S.
- Died: November 21, 2023 (aged 95); Santa Rosa, California, U.S.
- Education: Adelbert College
- Occupations: Labor activist, flight attendant
- Employer: American Airlines

Barbara "Dusty" Roads (April 9, 1928 – November 21, 2023) was an American labor activist and American Airlines flight attendant. She successfully fought the industry-wide practice that fired stewardesses once they reached the age of 32, citing gender discrimination when compared to male pilots. She helped found the Association of Professional Flight Attendants in 1977, one of the largest independent labor unions.

== Early life and education ==
Roads was born and grew up in the Gates Mills suburb of Cleveland, Ohio on April 9, 1928. As a child, she was interested in becoming a pilot, but recalls her father telling her that the airlines "don’t hire ladies”.

Roads graduated from Flora Stone Mather College. Her father, Conger G. Roads, was a lawyer. Barbara had a brother.

== Career and activism ==
Roads joined American Airlines as a flight attendant in 1950. In 1953, the airline implemented a change in the contracts for stewardesses that would force an 'early retirement' at the age of 32. This rule was soon adopted across the airline industry. Roads pushed for the Airline Stewards and Stewardesses Association (ALSSA) union to fight this rule on the grounds of gender discrimination. Roads served as the contract negotiator for ALSSA, as well as the chair for the Los Angeles base. In 1958, she was appointed to the role of ALSSA's national lobbyist. While working in Washington, D.C., she befriended both Rep. Martha W. Griffiths and Sen. Margaret Chase Smith, earning their support for her cause.

Roads continued the fight into the 1960s and regularly lobbied politicians and celebrities during flights, including then-Vice President Richard Nixon. At a press conference in 1963, Roads famously asked reporters "Do I look like an old bag?", making newspaper headlines across the country and raising the national profile of the issue of gender discrimination.

After the passage of the Civil Rights Act of 1964, Roads joined with other flight attendants to file the first anti-discrimination complaint in the United States. According to Roads: "The bill said that the Equal Employment Opportunity Commission would begin operating on July 1st, 1965. We were on their doorstep." Their case was finally won in 1968 when the EEOC issued a ruling disallowing "age ceilings" by American Airlines and the rest of the airline industry.

In 1977, Roads helped found the Association of Professional Flight Attendants, one of the largest independent labor unions. Roads retired at the age of 66.

== Later life and death ==
In 2017, Roads was honored as a "Trailblazing Woman in Labor and Business" by the National Women's History Project for her work fighting gender discrimination within the airline industry.

Roads died in Santa Rosa, California on November 21, 2023, at the age of 95.
