= Cuyahoga County Airport =

Cuyahoga County Airport Robert D. Shea Field
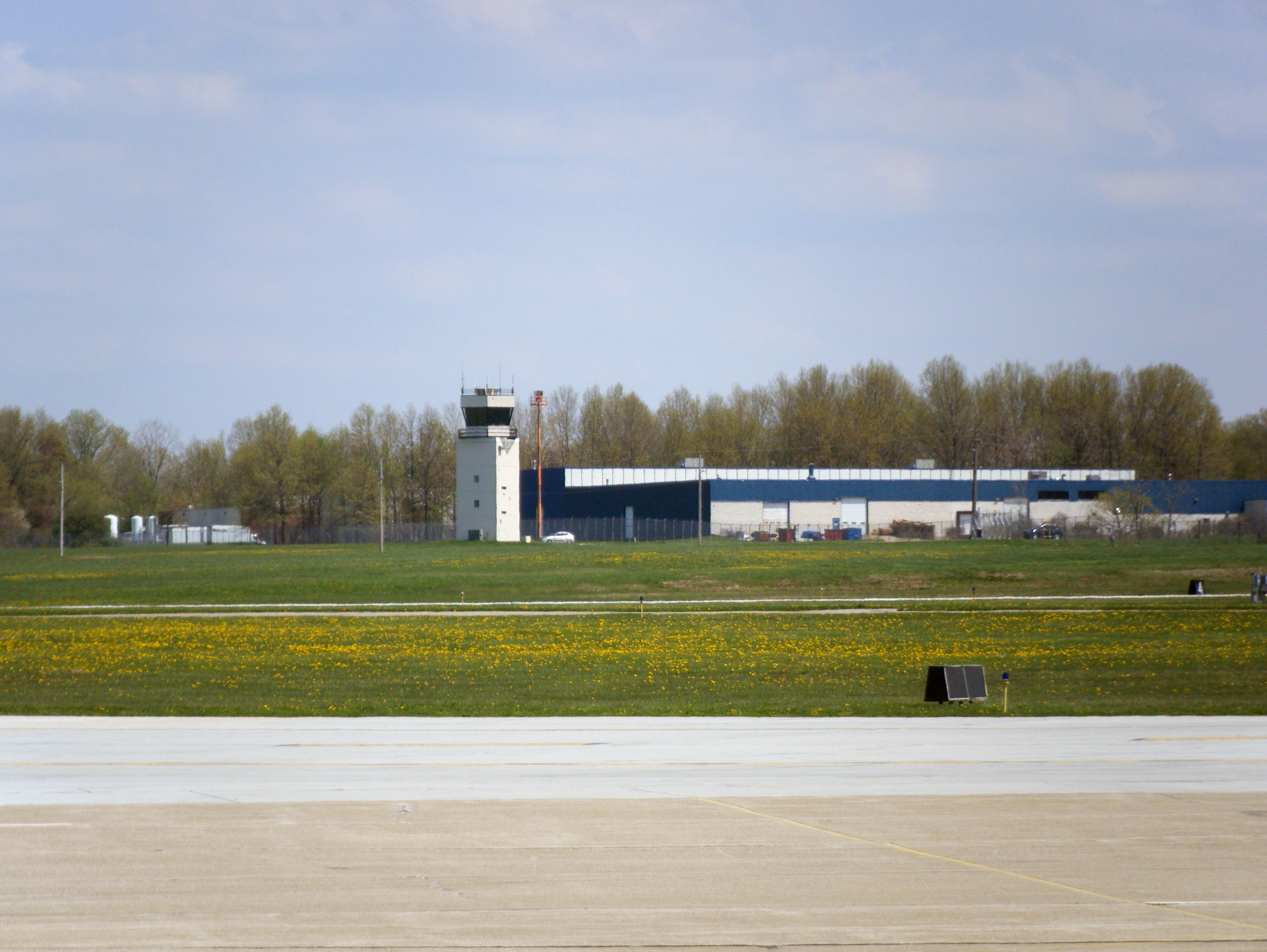
- Control tower at KCGF

- Airport diagram
- IATA: CGF; ICAO: KCGF; FAA LID: CGF

Summary
- Airport type: Public
- Owner/Operator: Cuyahoga County
- Serves: Cleveland, Ohio
- Location: Highland Heights; Richmond Heights; Willoughby Hills
- Time zone: UTC−05:00 (-5)
  - Summer (DST): UTC−04:00 (-4)
- Elevation AMSL: 879 ft (268 m)
- Coordinates: 41°33′54″N 081°29′11″W
- Website: CuyahogaCounty.us/...

Map
- Location of airport in Ohio CGF (the United States)

Runways
Direction	Length		Surface
Direction	ft	m	Surface
6/24	5,102	1,555	Asphalt

Statistics (2020)
- Aircraft operations: 23,000
- Based aircraft: 247
- Source: Federal Aviation Administration

Cuyahoga County Airport (IATA: CGF, ICAO: KCGF, FAA LID: CGF), also known as Robert D. Shea Field, is a public use airport in northeastern Cuyahoga County, Ohio, United States. Owned and operated by Cuyahoga County since 1946, it also serves Lake County and Geauga County. The airport is located 10 nautical miles (12 mi, 19 km) east of downtown Cleveland and sits on the border of three cities: Highland Heights, Richmond Heights and Willoughby Hills. It is included in the National Plan of Integrated Airport Systems for 2011–2015, which categorized it as a general aviation reliever airport for Cleveland Hopkins International Airport.

== History ==
The airport was developed in 1928 by Curtiss-Wright and operated until it closed as a privately owned airport in 1930. The airport site remained inactive until nearly the end of World War II. In the spring of 1946, the voters of Cuyahoga County approved a general obligation bond issue for the acquisition of the airport in the amount of $510,000. They purchased the Curtiss Wright Field in December 1946.

In September 1949, the 271-acre Curtiss Wright Field, also known as the Richmond Road Airport, was opened for business. The county officially opened the airport on May 30, 1950.

In the late 1950s, Cuyahoga County hired an engineering firm to develop a master plan for the future of the airport. The plan, created in 1956, called for two runways, hangar facilities and other service area developments for private and business aviation. Shortly thereafter, major expansion of the County Airport began. It included the construction of the first runway in 1959 and later its expansion in 1962. Further development included the acquisition and installation of instrument approach facilities, the construction of a concrete apron and a paved entry road.

In the 1960s, the airport's first two fixed-base operators moved in. County land sales and matching helped to expand the runways and add additional hangars. By early June 1968, the American Aircraft Corporation was building AA-1s at the airport. The growth of air traffic prompted the airport manager to bring in a trailer-mounted temporary control tower by early January 1969. The tower was dedicated five months later – becoming the only non-federal tower on a public airport in the United States. The facility was taken over by the FAA on May 15, 1971.

By the 1980s, development of the adjacent land into office space and an industrial park had begun. In 1984, an office building was constructed on the flight line and soon became known as the Destination Building. Expansion of the Airport Industrial Park and Curtis Wright Corporate Center II continued throughout the 1990s.

On October 31, 1991, Aviation Administrator Robert D. Shea retired after 42 years of dedicated service. In tribute, Cuyahoga County changed the name of the airport to Cuyahoga County Airport, Robert D. Shea Field.

In 2003, the Airport Division, now under the auspices of the Cuyahoga County Department of Development, was awarded an FAA grant to assist with a Master Plan Update and Runway Safety Area Study Project.

The airport's control tower was shut down for a time in 2013 due to federal budget cuts. It has since reopened.

== Airlines and destinations ==
=== Cargo ===
Airlines	Destinations
DHL Aviation	Cincinnati

== Facilities and aircraft ==
Cuyahoga County Airport covers an area of 640 acres (259 ha) at an elevation of 879 feet (268 m) above mean sea level. It has one runway designated 6/24 with an asphalt surface measuring 5,102 by 100 feet (1,555 x 30 m).

The facilities include 6 office buildings in the industrial park, an administrative safety and service complex, 15 hangar facilities and 2 tie-down areas to accommodate the 133 based aircraft, a flight school, US Customs, an FAA air traffic control tower, an 18-hole golf course, and an employee base in excess of 2000.

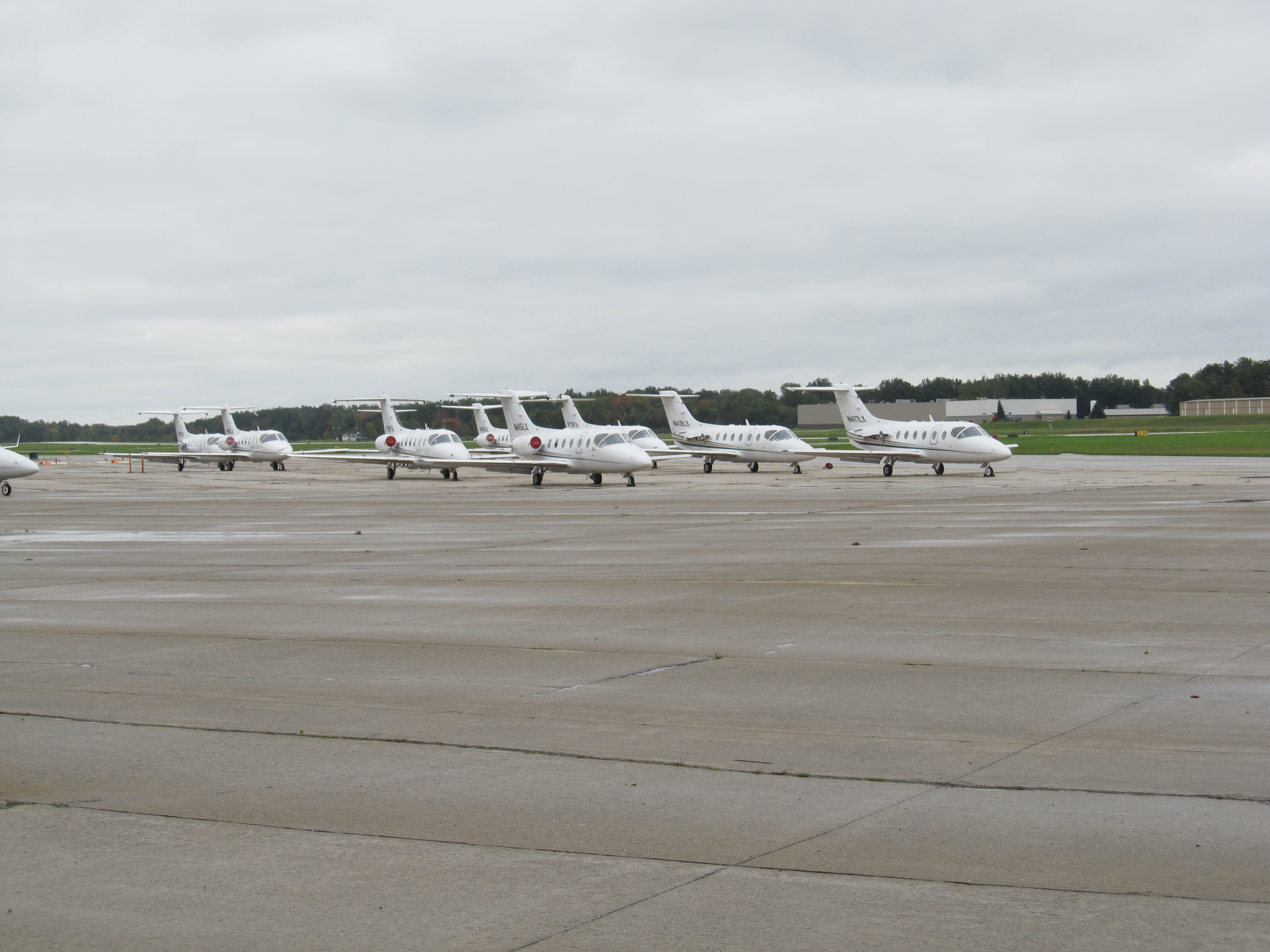
Planes at KCGF

For the 12-month period ending December 31, 2020, the airport had 23,000 aircraft operations, an average of 63 per day: 78% general aviation, 21% air taxi, and <1% military. This is down from 67,662 annual operations in 2010. In 2020, there were 247 aircraft based at the airport, up from 133 in 2010: 169 jets, 59 single-engine and 18 multi-engine airplanes, and 1 helicopter.

As of 2023, the airport has one FBO, which offers fuel – both avgas and jet fuel – and amenities such as conference rooms, a crew lounge, snooze rooms, showers, and a courtesy car.

=== Businesses ===
- Air Z Flying Service
  - Private charter service
- Aircraft Maintenance Inc.
  - Aircraft maintenance
- Cleveland Jet Center
  - Hangars, terminal lounge, aircraft cleaning/maintenance
- Flexjet
- Flight Options
- Nextant Aerospace
- T&G Flying Club
  - Flight school, aircraft rental, aircraft management

== Accidents and incidents ==
- On February 24, 1994, a Beechjet 400A collided with terrain during landing at Cuyahoga County Airport. The crew was executing an instrument landing system approach and broke out of the clouds 1,800 feet above ground level. No runway lights were observed, and the pilots attempted to activate them with the aircraft's radio. By the time the pilots realized they would not land on the runway, it was too late to execute a go-around, and the airplane impacted a grass area between the runway and taxiway Alpha.
- On February 10, 2002, a Mitsubishi MU-300 was substantially damaged during an overrun at the Cuyahoga County Airport. The aircraft was arriving on a positioning flight from the Chicago Executive Airport and had been told before departure that a Cessna Citation had reported braking action as fair to good. However, a Hawker jet that landed immediately before the Mitsubishi reported braking action as poor. Upon touchdown, the Mitsubishi's speed brakes were deployed, and maximum braking applied. The PIC noted that anti-skid pulsating did not activate. Aircraft deceleration was slow, and the pilots soon realized the airplane was not going to stop on the runway. Attempting a go-around was not an option due to the amount of runway remaining. The airplane departed the end of the runway at a speed of 20-30 mph and proceeded onto a down sloping grass overrun area. As the airplane was about to come to a stop, the nose gear struck a mound, and the nose landing gear assembly collapsed. The probable cause of the accident was found to be the pilot's failure to obtain the proper touch down point on the runway, and the pilot-in-commands failure to initiate a go-round. Factors in the accident were the tailwind condition and the snow-covered runway.
- On March 27, 2003, a Cessna 172 Skyhawk was damaged during a hard landing at Cuyahoga County Airport. In a written statement, the student pilot said that his airspeed was too high on short final. He flared too high, and the airplane "dropped" and bounced three or four times. The probable cause of the accident was found to be the student pilot's improper flare, which resulted in a hard landing.
- On December 18, 2004, a Raytheon Beechjet 400A was substantially damaged after being struck by a ground service vehicle at the Cuyahoga County Airport. The vehicle's driver fell out of the vehicle while trying to retrieve a tow bar, and the unoccupied vehicle struck the plane's right wing. The probable cause of the incident was found to be the loss of directional control by the operator of a ground service vehicle.
- On January 4, 2005, an Aero Commander 690A was substantially damaged while landing at the Cuyahoga County Airport. The pilots reported that they conducted a "normal" ILS approach and landing to runway 24; however, during the landing rollout, the airplane began to yaw to the right. Attempts by both pilots to correct the yaw were unsuccessful and the airplane departed the runway surface. The airplane slid sideways and came to a stop partially on the runway and partially on the grass. The airplane crossed a taxiway, impacted two taxiway signs, and then skidded sideways, parallel to runway 24. The probable cause of the accident was found to be the pilot's failure to maintain directional control during landing, which resulted in an impact with a sign.
- On April 18, 2006, a Cessna 177 Cardinal sustained substantial damage during a hard landing at the Cuyahoga County Airport. The pilot was practicing takeoffs and landings in the traffic pattern when, on the third landing, the airplane bounced. When it settled back to the ground, it hit the runway hard, and the nose wheel tire went flat. The probable cause of the accident was found to be the pilot's misjudged flare which resulted in a bounced landing, and his inadequate recovery from the bounced landing that led to a hard landing.
- In April 2009, a Cirrus SR22 crashed after takeoff from the Cuyahoga County Airport.
- On March 30, 2013, a Cessna 310 experienced a bird strike while onducting a practice instrument approach in visual conditions. The airplane sustained substantial damage to the right wing as a result of the collision. The pilot maintained control of the airplane and transitioned to a visual approach, subsequently executing a straight-in, no flap landing without further incident. The probable cause of the incident was found to be a bird strike during a practice instrument approach in visual conditions.
- On August 25, 2014, a Cessna 172 Skyhawk crashed after departure from Cuyahoga County Airport. The four people on board, all students at Case Western Reserve University, died. In response to the crash, county officials bolstered emergency response services at the airport.
- In January 2023, a flight en route to Cuyahoga County Airport made news after crashing in New York. The flight had departed from John F Kennedy International Airport and reported engine trouble, and it crashed while attempting to approach Westchester County Airport in White Plains, New York. Both aboard died.

== See also ==
- List of airports in Ohio
