= Front Row Theater =

1974–1993 performance space near Cleveland, Ohio,

Coordinates: 41.54054°N 81.45520°W

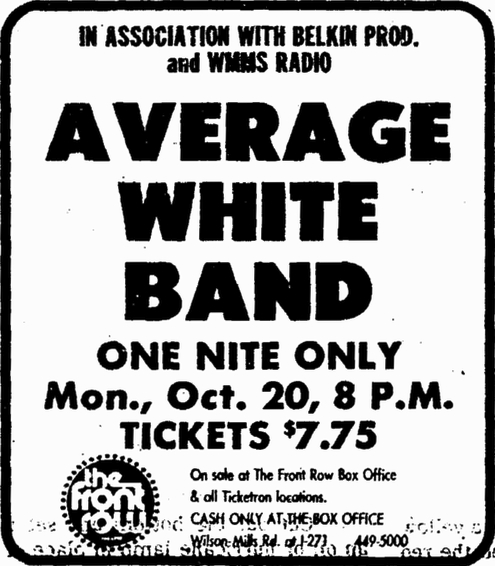
Advertisement for a 1980 Average White Band concert at the Front Row

The Front Row Theater was a 3,200-seat performance space in Highland Heights, Ohio, which operated from 1974 to 1993.

== Construction and opening ==
The Front Row was located in Highland Heights, Ohio, in suburban Cleveland, on Wilson Mills Road just west of Interstate 271. Its construction was completed in 1974, at a cost of $3 million (equivalent to $19,600,000 in 2025). Its architect was Richard R. Jencen. The Front Row was a theater-in-the-round, with the stage rotating during each performance, and absence of pillars that ensured clear views. Its capacity was 3,200.

Nate Dolin, a former vice president of the Cleveland Indians, was a leader of the partnership that founded and ran the theater.

The Front Row opened July 5, 1974, with a performance by Sammy Davis Jr.

== Performances ==
The Front Row was primarily a music venue. Musicians and comedians advertised or reported as performing there included (in rough order of their first performance there): Sammy Davis Jr., the Jackson 5, the Pointer Sisters, Frank Zappa, Marlene Dietrich, Chuck Berry, Little Richard, Harry Belafonte, Loretta Lynn, Cheech & Chong, Al Green, Dionne Warwick, Isaac Hayes, Sonny & Cher, Frankie Valli, the O'Jays, Roberta Flack, Rufus and Chaka Khan, Donna Summer, Mel Torme, Captain & Tennille, Marvin Gaye, Aretha Franklin, Tony Orlando, Spinners, David Ruffin, Muddy Waters, the Osmonds, James Brown, Bill Cosby, Chuck Mangione, Gladys Knight & the Pips, Bob Hope, Tony Bennett, Johnny Mathis, Alice Cooper, Peter Tosh, Miles Davis, Liberace, Jimmy Buffett, Lou Rawls, the Righteous Brothers, Tom Jones, George Clinton, Bobby Womack, Ray Charles, Waylon Jennings, Roy Ayers, Hank Williams Jr., Paul Anka, Neil Sedaka, Whitney Houston, Gordon Lightfoot, Wynton Marsalis, the Commodores, B.B. King, Run-DMC, Jay Leno, the Temptations, the Four Tops, Cheap Trick, Luther Vandross, Willie Nelson, Stephen Stills, Fats Domino, Emmylou Harris, Kenny Rogers, Anita Baker, Liza Minnelli, The Oak Ridge Boys, Diana Ross, Peter, Paul & Mary, Wayne Newton, Victor Borge, Joan Rivers, Spyro Gyra, Al Dimeola, Miriam Makeba, Hugh Masekela, Sheena Easton, Miami Sound Machine, Roy Orbison, George Carlin, Bob Newhart, Marie Osmond, Salt-N-Pepa, and The Statler Brothers.

The Front Row also hosted lectures by luminaries including former President Gerald Ford, as well as wrestling matches.

Many local high schools held their graduations at the Front Row.

The Michael Stanley Band ended its 13-year career with a sold-out run of 12 performances at the Front Row between December 16, 1986, and January 3, 1987.

Roy Orbison performed his last concert at the Front Row on December 4, 1988, two days before his death.

== Closing ==
The Front Row closed in 1993, when it merged with the Playhouse Square Foundation, which operates the then-recently renovated and revitalized Playhouse Square theaters in downtown Cleveland. Luther Vandross closed down the venue with a pair of sold-out concerts on June 22 and 23 of that year. The Front Row's remaining bookings were transferred to the Playhouse Square theaters. According to a 2019 Plain Dealer article, acts that would have played the Front Row now perform at the Playhouse Square theaters.

The building was torn down in 1995. A Home Depot is now on its site.
