= Glenn W. Frank =

American geologist (1928–1993)

- Born: Glenn William Frank; January 13, 1928; Mayfield Heights, Ohio, US
- Died: August 23, 1993 (aged 65)
- Occupation: Professor
- Known for: Defusing violent confrontation after the 1970 Kent State shootings
- Spouse: Betty Lousie Dahlgren
- Children: 3

Academic background
- Education: Kent State University; University of Maine; Western Reserve University

Academic work
- Discipline: Geologist

Glenn William Frank (January 13, 1928 – August 23, 1993) was an American geologist and professor at Kent State University. He is credited with saving many student lives after the Kent State shootings of 1970.

== Life ==
Frank was born in Mayfield Heights, Ohio, United States, to Harold and Gertrude Frank, both schoolteachers. He served in the U.S. Marine Corps, from 1946 to 1947. As an undergraduate on the G.I. Bill he studied geology at Kent State University, going on to postgraduate study at the University of Maine and Case Western Reserve University. From 1953 to his retirement in 1984 Frank was a geology professor at Kent State University.

Frank married Betty Louise Dahlgren in 1949 and had three children. He died of cancer in 1993. A scholarship was established in his honor at Kent State.

== Kent State shootings ==
On May 4, 1970, four unarmed students were shot dead at Kent State by the Ohio National Guard, during a peace rally against the expansion of the Vietnam War into neutral Cambodia by the United States. There had been repeated protests against police and military recruiting on campus, and the Reserve Officers' Training Corps building was burned down on May 2. The mayor of Kent called in the Ohio Army National Guard, which attempted to disperse students on May 4.

Frank was a faculty marshal at the student protest on that day. He managed to persuade students to disperse after the National Guard had fired on the crowd. Immediately after the shootings, many angry students were ready to launch an all-out attack on the National Guard. Faculty members led by Frank pleaded with the students to leave the campus Commons and not to give in to violent escalation:

I don't care whether you've never listened to anyone before in your lives. I am begging you right now. If you don't disperse right now, they're going to move in, and it can only be a slaughter. Would you please listen to me? Jesus Christ, I don't want to be a part of this ... !

After 20 minutes of speaking, the students left the Commons, as ambulance personnel tended to the wounded, and the Guard left the area. Professor Frank's son, also present that day, said: "He absolutely saved my life and hundreds of others."

Frank later wrote an information brochure about the incident. He criticized both the shootings and the work of a grand jury that investigated the events on Kent State's campus, and was cited for contempt of court for defying an order not to talk about the investigation after testifying before the grand jury.
