= W.A. Thorp House =

- W.A. Thorp House (Demolished)
- U.S. National Register of Historic Places
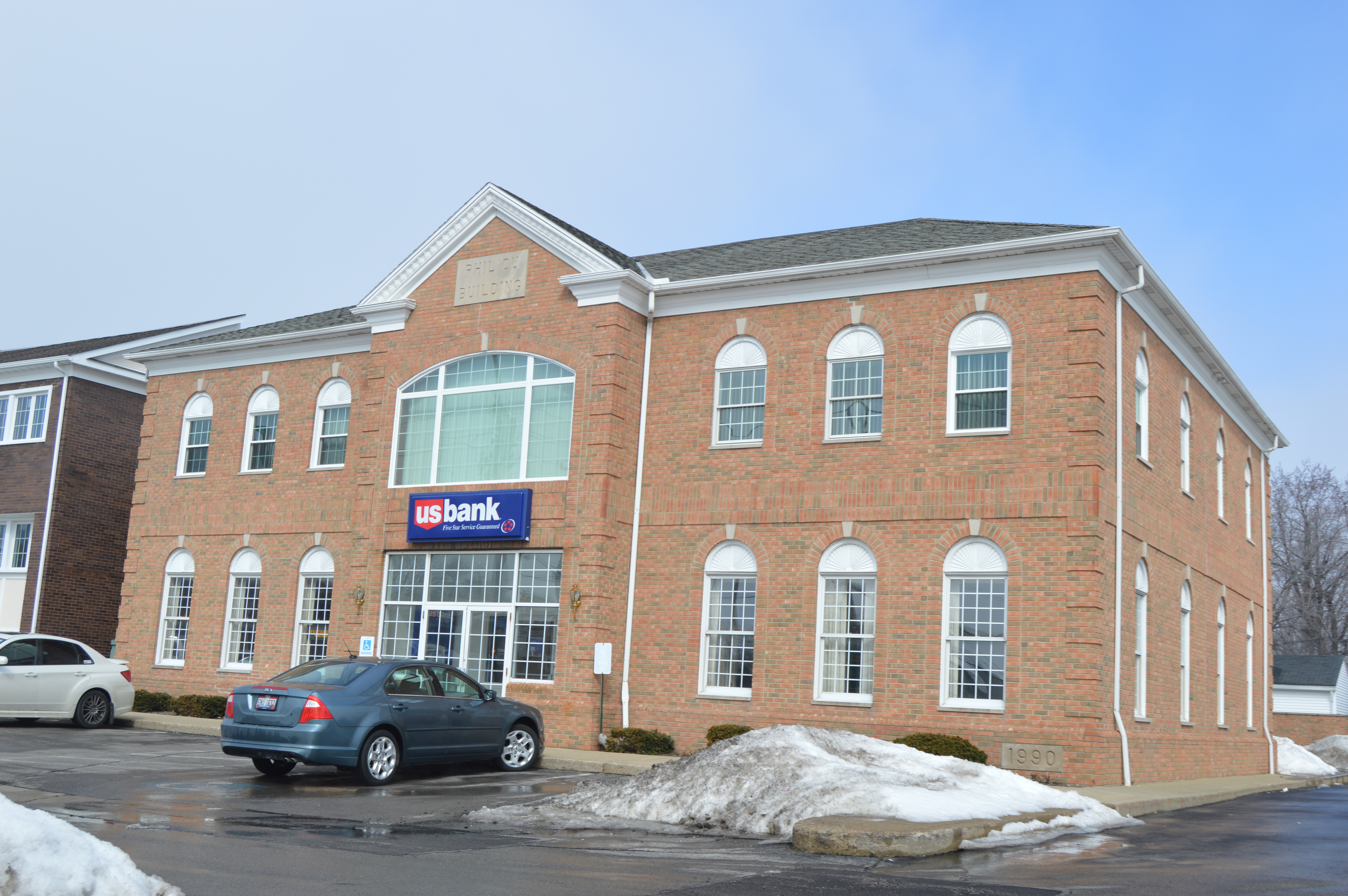
- Site of the house

- Location within Ohio Location within the United States
- Location: 6183-6185 Mayfield Road, Mayfield Heights, Ohio
- Coordinates: 41°31′13″N 81°27′23″W
- Area: Less than 1 acre (0.40 ha)
- Built: 1886
- Architect: W.A. Thorp
- Architectural style: Stick
- NRHP reference No.: 78002046
- Added to NRHP: December 4, 1978

The W.A. Thorp House was a historically significant farmhouse in the Cleveland-area city of Mayfield Heights. Built in the 1880s for one of the first men of the township, it was named a historic site in the 1970s, but it is no longer standing.

A native of nearby Warrensville, W.A. Thorp moved to Mayfield Township at the age of thirty-one in 1863. Buying nearly 250 acres (100 ha) in the township, he made himself wealthy, and his fellowmen elected him a township trustee. Thorp arranged for the construction of a new house in 1886. This building combined elements of the Italianate and Stick styles then popular.

Built in the shape of the letter "L", the two-story house featured a complex gabled roof, a two-story bay window on one of the narrower gables, and balustrades at both floor and ceiling level on porches on the rear and in the ell of the main part of the house. Unusually, the weatherboarded walls were covered with siding of different sorts, and the exterior was further distinguished by elaborate woodwork under the eaves at the tops of the gables, wall boards giving the appearance of masonry beltcourses. Italianate influence was largely the result of a collection of brackets forming the cornice.

In late 1978, Thorp's house was listed on the National Register of Historic Places because of its historically significant architecture. Almost identical to its appearance at construction nearly a century earlier, the house was deemed one of the most important houses in the former Mayfield Township, both because of its well-preserved architecture and its place as the home of a significant man in local history. Despite this distinction, the house is no longer standing, having been replaced by a U.S. Bank branch. It officially remains listed on the National Register.
