= Gates Mills Methodist Episcopal Church =

Historic church in Ohio, United States

- U.S. National Register of Historic Places
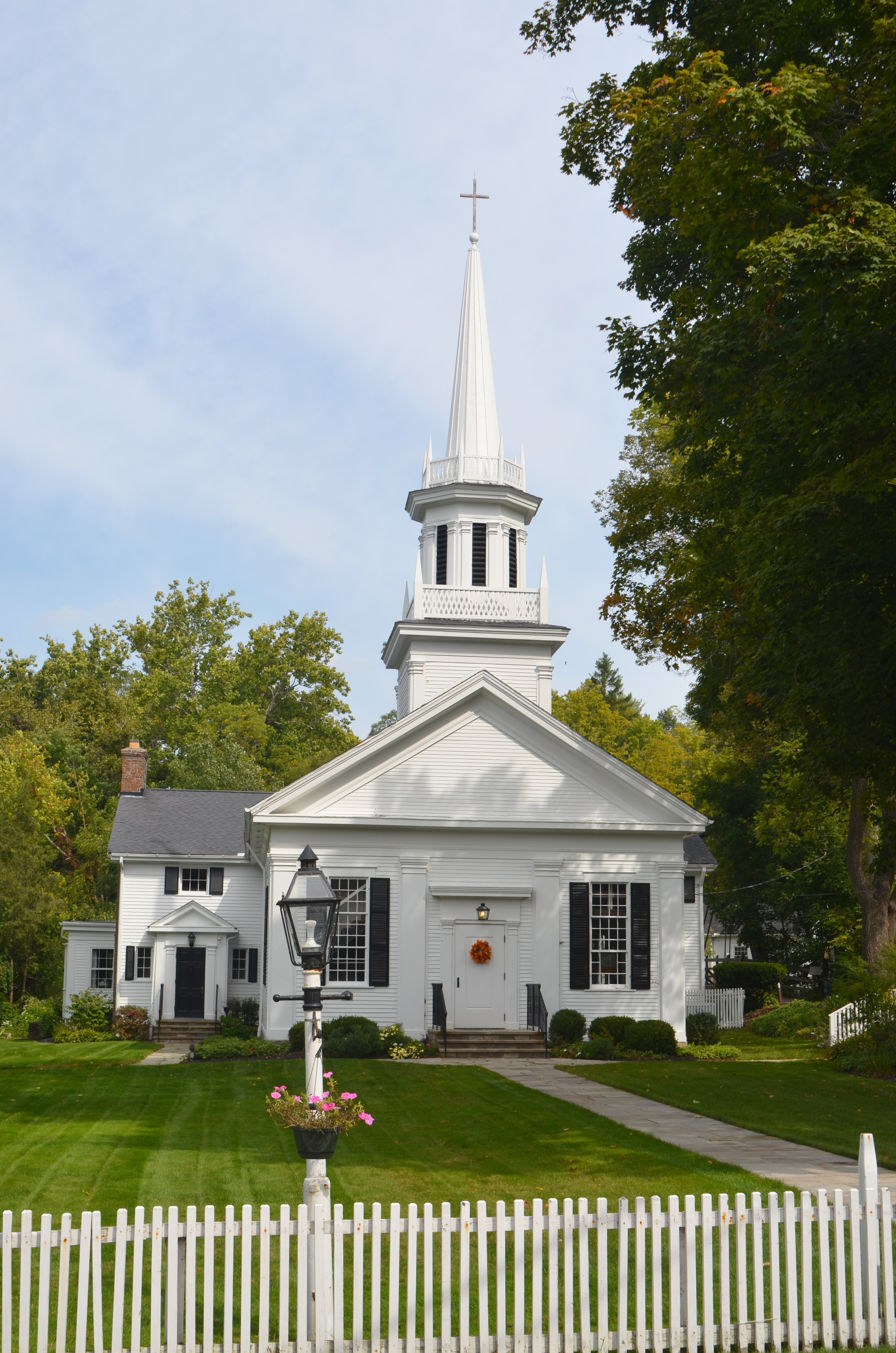
- St. Christopher's-by-the-River

- Location within Ohio Location within the United States
- Location: Old Mill Rd. off U.S. 322, Gates Mills, Ohio
- Coordinates: 41°31′4″N 81°24′17″W
- Area: less than one acre
- Built: 1853
- Architect: Walker, Frank R.; Rogers, L.G.
- Architectural style: Greek Revival
- NRHP reference No.: 75001367
- Added to NRHP: July 18, 1975

Gates Mills Methodist Episcopal Church (also known as St. Christopher's-by-the-River) is a historic church on Old Mill Road off U.S. 322 in Gates Mills, Ohio.

It was built in 1853 and added to the National Register of Historic Places in 1975.
