= Mayfield, Ohio =

- Village
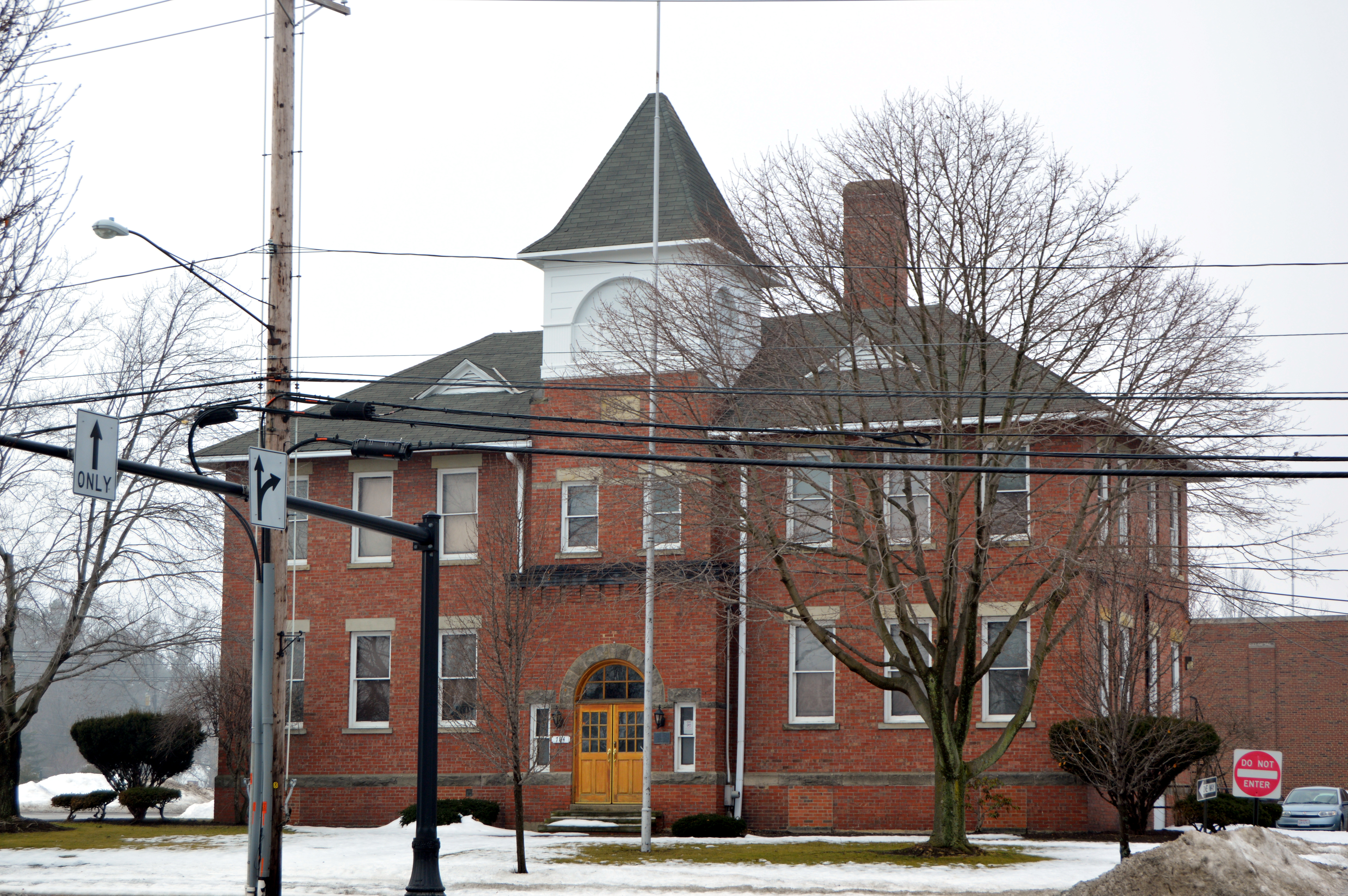
- Old Center School on SOM Center Road
- Interactive map of Mayfield, Ohio
- Location within Ohio Location within the United States
- Coordinates: 41°33′7.03″N 81°26′14.898″W
- Country: United States
- State: Ohio
- County: Cuyahoga
- Founded: 1819
- Incorporated: 1920

Government
  - Mayor: Brenda T. Bodnar (D)

Area
  - Total: 3.95 sq mi (10.22 km^{2})
  - Land: 3.94 sq mi (10.20 km^{2})
  - Water: 0.0077 sq mi (0.02 km^{2})
- Elevation: 935 ft (285 m)

Population (2020)
  - Total: 3,356
  - Density: 852.2/sq mi (329.02/km^{2})
- Time zone: UTC-5 (EST)
  - Summer (DST): UTC-4 (EDT)
- ZIP code: 44143
- Area code: 440
- FIPS code: 39-48468
- GNIS feature ID: 1061487
- Website: www.mayfieldvillage.com

Mayfield, also known as Mayfield Village, is a village in eastern Cuyahoga County, Ohio, United States. A suburb of Cleveland, it is part of the Cleveland metropolitan area. The population was 3,356 at the 2020 census.

== Geography ==
Mayfield is located at 41°32′52″N 81°26′37″W (41.547902, -81.443586).

According to the United States Census Bureau, the village has a total area of 3.96 square miles (10.26 km^{2}), of which 3.95 square miles (10.23 km^{2}) is land and 0.01 square miles (0.03 km^{2}) is water. Mayfield Village is bordered by Highland Heights to the west, Mayfield Heights to the south, Gates Mills to the east, and Willoughby Hills to the north.

== Demographics ==
Historical population
Census	Pop.	Note	%±
1930	344		—
1940	448		30.2%
1950	805		79.7%
1960	1,977		145.6%
1970	3,548		79.5%
1980	3,577		0.8%
1990	3,462		−3.2%
2000	3,435		−0.8%
2010	3,460		0.7%
2020	3,356		−3.0%
U.S. Decennial Census

=== Racial and ethnic composition ===
Note: the US Census treats Hispanic/Latino as an ethnic category. This table excludes Latinos from the racial categories and assigns them to a separate category. Hispanics/Latinos may be of any race.
Race / Ethnicity (NH = Non-Hispanic)	Pop 2000	Pop 2010	Pop 2020	% 2000	% 2010	% 2020
White alone (NH)	3,217	3,082	2,865	93.65%	89.08%	85.37%
Black or African American alone (NH)	45	92	181	1.31%	2.66%	5.39%
Native American or Alaska Native alone (NH)	1	1	1	0.03%	0.03%	0.03%
Asian alone (NH)	123	206	115	3.58%	5.95%	3.43%
Native Hawaiian or Pacific Islander alone (NH)	0	0	0	0.00%	0.00%	0.00%
Other race alone (NH)	6	1	17	0.17%	0.03%	0.51%
Mixed race or Multiracial (NH)	16	36	99	0.47%	1.04%	2.95%
Hispanic or Latino (any race)	27	42	78	0.79%	1.21%	2.32%
Total	3,435	3,460	3,356	100.00%	100.00%	100.00%

=== 2020 census ===
As of the 2020 census, Mayfield had a population of 3,356. The median age was 49.3 years. 18.5% of residents were under the age of 18 and 26.3% of residents were 65 years of age or older. For every 100 females there were 95.0 males, and for every 100 females age 18 and over there were 95.0 males age 18 and over.

99.7% of residents lived in urban areas, while 0.3% lived in rural areas.

There were 1,421 households in Mayfield, of which 26.8% had children under the age of 18 living in them. Of all households, 54.5% were married-couple households, 17.0% were households with a male householder and no spouse or partner present, and 24.5% were households with a female householder and no spouse or partner present. About 27.9% of all households were made up of individuals and 14.4% had someone living alone who was 65 years of age or older.

There were 1,497 housing units, of which 5.1% were vacant. The homeowner vacancy rate was 1.5% and the rental vacancy rate was 8.9%.

=== Demographic estimates ===
28.4% were of Italian, 16.4% German, 13.1% Irish, 6.0% English, 5.9% Russian, and 2.4% Slovak, Swedish, and Welsh ancestries.

90.7% spoke English, 3.3% Russian, 2.2% Italian, 1.7% Hungarian, and 0.9% Spanish.

=== 2010 census ===
As of the census of 2010, there were 3,460 people, 1,531 households, and 987 families living in the village. The population density was 875.9 inhabitants per square mile (338.2/km^{2}). There were 1,614 housing units at an average density of 408.6 per square mile (157.8/km^{2}). The racial makeup of the village was 90.1% White, 2.8% African American, 6.0% Asian, 0.1% from other races, and 1.0% from two or more races. Hispanic or Latino of any race were 1.2% of the population.

There were 1,531 households, of which 24.8% had children under the age of 18 living with them, 54.7% were married couples living together, 6.3% had a female householder with no husband present, 3.5% had a male householder with no wife present, and 35.5% were non-families. 31.7% of all households were made up of individuals, and 16.8% had someone living alone who was 65 years of age or older. The average household size was 2.26 and the average family size was 2.87.

The median age in the village was 48.3 years. 19.3% of residents were under the age of 18; 5.9% were between the ages of 18 and 24; 19.7% were from 25 to 44; 30.9% were from 45 to 64; and 24.2% were 65 years of age or older. The gender makeup of the village was 49.6% male and 50.4% female.

=== 2000 census ===
As of the census of 2000, there were 3,435 people, 1,392 households, and 1,013 families living in the village. The population density was 875.2 inhabitants per square mile (337.9/km^{2}). There were 1,471 housing units at an average density of 374.8 per square mile (144.7/km^{2}). The racial makeup of the village was 94.44% White, 1.31% African American, 0.03% Native American, 3.58% Asian, 0.17% from other races, and 0.47% from two or more races. Hispanic or Latino of any race were 0.79% of the population.

There were 1,392 households, out of which 25.9% had children under the age of 18 living with them, 62.6% were married couples living together, 7.5% had a female householder with no husband present, and 27.2% were non-families. 23.1% of all households were made up of individuals, and 12.1% had someone living alone who was 65 years of age or older. The average household size was 2.47 and the average family size was 2.92.

In the village, the population was spread out, with 20.8% under the age of 18, 5.6% from 18 to 24, 22.9% from 25 to 44, 27.4% from 45 to 64, and 23.3% who were 65 years of age or older. The median age was 45 years. For every 100 females there were 92.2 males. For every 100 females age 18 and over, there were 91.6 males.

The median income for a household in the village was $66,048, and the median income for a family was $72,065. Males had a median income of $52,361 versus $34,152 for females. The per capita income for the village was $36,360. About 1.8% of families and 2.6% of the population were below the poverty line, including 2.1% of those under age 18 and 4.8% of those age 65 or over.

== Economy ==
Mayfield is the headquarters of Fortune 500 insurance company Progressive Corporation.

== Education ==
Mayfield Village is a part of the Mayfield City School District, along with Gates Mills, Highland Heights, and Mayfield Heights. The village's high school is Mayfield High School.

== Notable people ==
- Andy Isabella, American football player
- Brad Stuver, soccer player
