= Mayfield Heights, Ohio =

- City
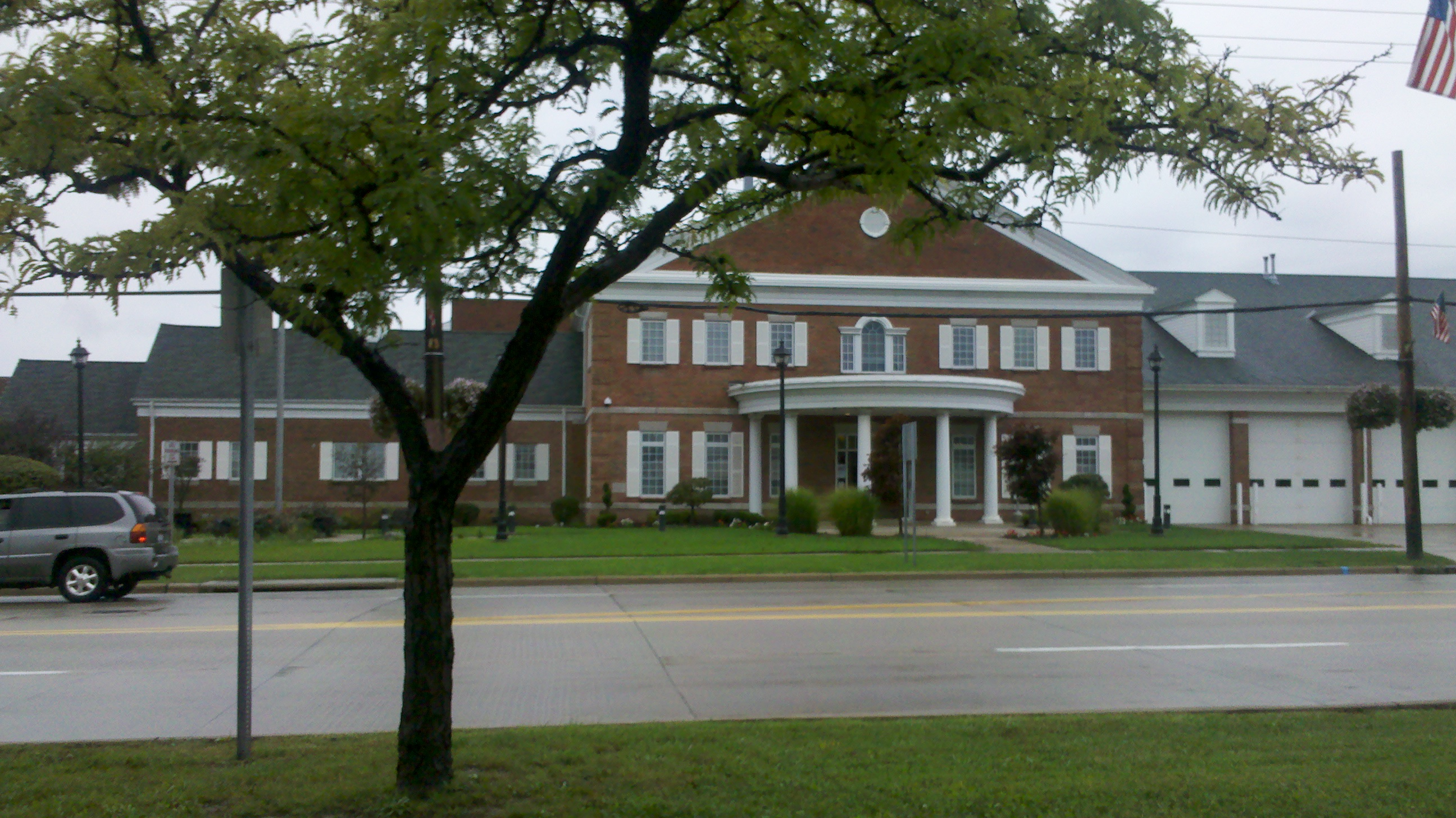
- Mayfield Heights City Hall
- Motto: "A Vibrant Community"
- Interactive map of Mayfield Heights, Ohio
- Location within Ohio Location within the United States
- Coordinates: 41°31′3″N 81°27′21″W
- Country: United States
- State: Ohio
- County: Cuyahoga
- Founded: 1920
- Incorporated: 1950

Government
  - Mayor: Anthony DiCicco (R)

Area
  - Total: 4.18 sq mi (10.82 km^{2})
  - Land: 4.17 sq mi (10.80 km^{2})
  - Water: 0.0077 sq mi (0.02 km^{2})
- Elevation: 1,086 ft (331 m)

Population (2020)
  - Total: 20,351
  - Density: 4,881.8/sq mi (1,884.87/km^{2})
- Time zone: UTC-5 (EST)
  - Summer (DST): UTC-4 (EDT)
- Zip code: 44124 and 44143
- Area code: 440
- FIPS code: 39-48482
- GNIS feature ID: 1056413
- Website: www.mayfieldheightsohio.gov

Mayfield Heights is a city in Cuyahoga County, Ohio, United States. The population was 20,351 at the 2020 census. An eastern suburb of Cleveland, it is part of the Cleveland metropolitan area.

== History ==
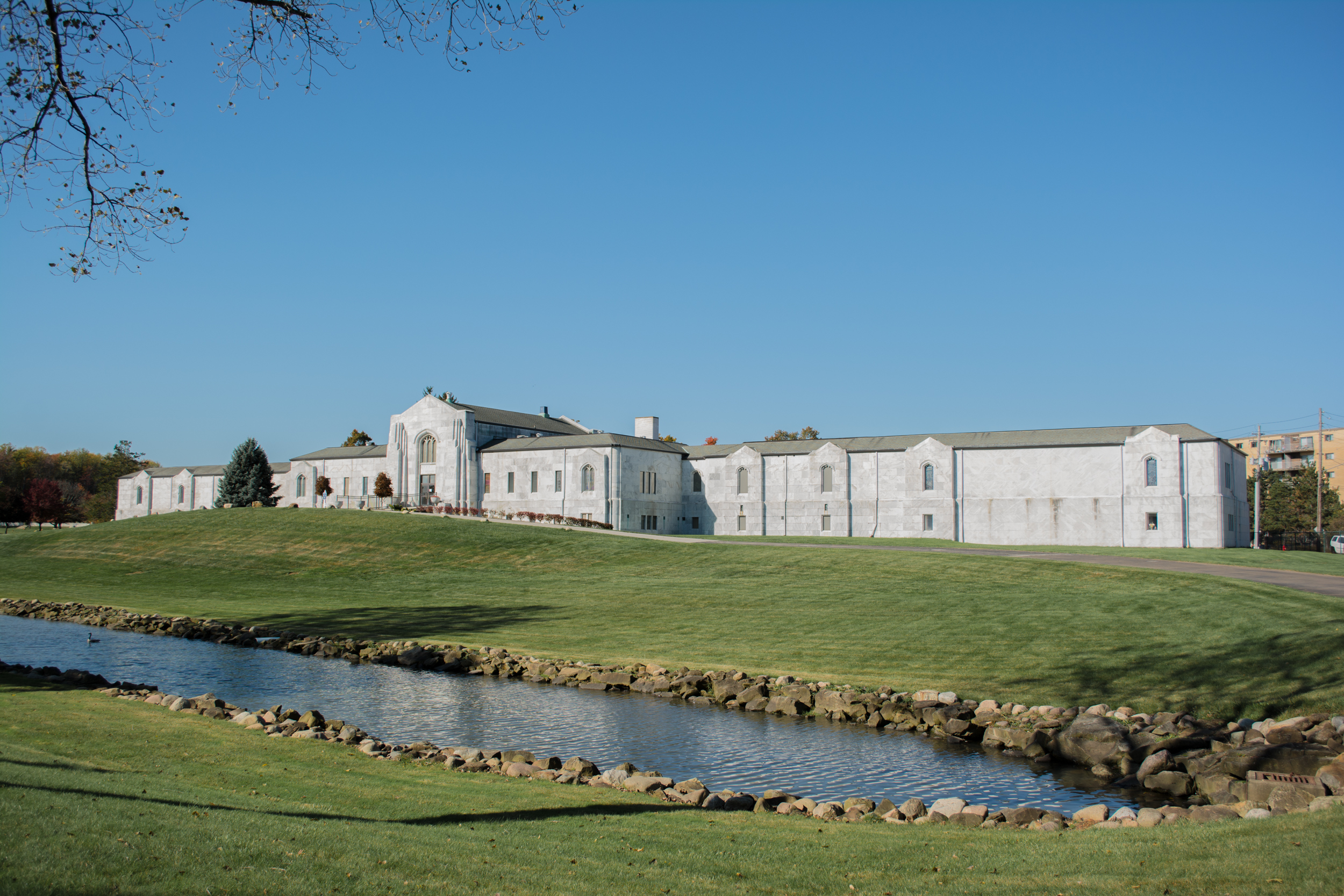
Mausoleum at Knollwood Cemetery

Mayfield Heights was incorporated as a village in 1925 and as a city in 1951. The city derives its name from Mayfield Township, now defunct. One location in the city, the W.A. Thorp House, was listed on the National Register of Historic Places in 1978.

The city has a large community of Italian Americans, including newly-arrived immigrants and those who migrated eastward along Mayfield Road from Little Italy on Cleveland's East Side. Since the dissolution of the USSR in 1991, they have been joined by a significant number of immigrants from Russia and other former Soviet republics.

== Geography ==
Mayfield Heights is located at 41°31′03″N 81°27′21″W.

According to the United States Census Bureau, the city has a total area of 4.18 square miles (10.83 km^{2}), of which 4.17 square miles (10.80 km^{2}) is land and 0.01 square miles (0.03 km^{2}) is water.

== Demographics ==
Historical population
Census	Pop.	Note	%±
1930	2,612		—
1940	2,696		3.2%
1950	5,807		115.4%
1960	13,478		132.1%
1970	22,139		64.3%
1980	21,550		−2.7%
1990	19,847		−7.9%
2000	19,386		−2.3%
2010	19,155		−1.2%
2020	20,351		6.2%
2025 (est.)	19,667		−3.4%

23.9% were of Italian, 14.5% German, 11.9% Irish, 7.4% Polish, 6.8% Russian, and 6.4% English ancestries.

=== Racial and ethnic composition ===
Mayfield Heights city, Ohio – Racial and ethnic composition Note: the US Census treats Hispanic/Latino as an ethnic category. This table excludes Latinos from the racial categories and assigns them to a separate category. Hispanics/Latinos may be of any race.
Race / Ethnicity (NH = Non-Hispanic)	Pop 2000	Pop 2010	Pop 2020	% 2000	% 2010	% 2020
White alone (NH)	17,648	15,141	13,674	91.03%	79.04%	67.19%
Black or African American alone (NH)	572	1,958	3,406	2.95%	10.22%	16.74%
Native American or Alaska Native alone (NH)	5	15	30	0.03%	0.08%	0.15%
Asian alone (NH)	781	1,331	1,760	4.03%	6.95%	8.65%
Native Hawaiian or Pacific Islander alone (NH)	1	2	1	0.01%	0.01%	0.00%
Other race alone (NH)	6	26	72	0.03%	0.14%	0.35%
Mixed race or Multiracial (NH)	172	291	765	0.89%	1.52%	3.76%
Hispanic or Latino (any race)	201	391	643	1.04%	2.04%	3.16%
Total	19,386	19,155	20,351	100.00%	100.00%	100.00%

=== Languages ===
81.0% spoke English, 7.11% Russian, 4.10% Italian, and 1.03% Arabic as their first language.

=== 2020 census ===
As of the 2020 census, Mayfield Heights had a population of 20,351. The median age was 41.1 years. 18.3% of residents were under the age of 18 and 23.4% of residents were 65 years of age or older. For every 100 females there were 84.9 males, and for every 100 females age 18 and over there were 81.0 males age 18 and over.

100.0% of residents lived in urban areas, while 0.0% lived in rural areas.

There were 10,152 households in Mayfield Heights, of which 22.7% had children under the age of 18 living in them. Of all households, 32.1% were married-couple households, 22.6% were households with a male householder and no spouse or partner present, and 39.7% were households with a female householder and no spouse or partner present. About 45.4% of all households were made up of individuals and 22.3% had someone living alone who was 65 years of age or older.

There were 10,749 housing units, of which 5.6% were vacant. The homeowner vacancy rate was 1.8% and the rental vacancy rate was 5.7%.

Racial composition as of the 2020 census
Race	Number	Percent
White	13,828	67.9%
Black or African American	3,453	17.0%
American Indian and Alaska Native	48	0.2%
Asian	1,762	8.7%
Native Hawaiian and Other Pacific Islander	3	0.0%
Some other race	192	0.9%
Two or more races	1,065	5.2%
Hispanic or Latino (of any race)	643	3.2%

=== 2010 census ===
As of the census of 2010, there were 19,155 people, 9,662 households, and 4,884 families living in the city. The population density was 4,593.5 inhabitants per square mile (1,773.6/km^{2}). There were 10,538 housing units at an average density of 2,527.1 per square mile (975.7/km^{2}). The racial makeup of the city was 80.4% White, 10.3% African American, 0.1% Native American, 7.0% Asian, 0.5% from other races, and 1.7% from two or more races. Hispanic or Latino people of any race were 2.0% of the population.

There were 9,662 households, of which 21.2% had children under the age of 18 living with them, 36.0% were married couples living together, 11.2% had a female householder with no husband present, 3.3% had a male householder with no wife present, and 49.5% were non-families. 44.2% of all households were made up of individuals, and 20.5% had someone living alone who was 65 years of age or older. The average household size was 1.97 and the average family size was 2.75.

The median age in the city was 42.9 years. 17.6% of residents were under the age of 18; 7.2% were between the ages of 18 and 24; 27.6% were from 25 to 44; 23.9% were from 45 to 64; and 23.8% were 65 years of age or older. The gender makeup of the city was 45.3% male and 54.7% female.

Of the city's population over the age of 25, 38.3% hold a bachelor's degree or higher.

=== 2000 census ===
As of the census of 2000, there were 19,386 people, 9,848 households, and 5,042 families living in the city. The population density was 4,596.1 inhabitants per square mile (1,774.6/km^{2}). There were 10,461 housing units at an average density of 2,480.1 per square mile (957.6/km^{2}). The racial makeup of the city was 91.85% White, 2.98% African American, 0.03% Native American, 4.03% Asian, 0.01% Pacific Islander, 0.18% from other races, and 0.93% from two or more races. Hispanic or Latino people of any race were 1.04% of the population.

There were 9,848 households, out of which 17.9% had children under the age of 18 living with them, 40.1% were married couples living together, 8.2% had a female householder with no husband present, and 48.8% were non-families. 44.5% of all households were made up of individuals, and 22.5% had someone living alone who was 65 years of age or older. The average household size was 1.95 and the average family size was 2.75.

In the city the population was spread out, with 16.1% under the age of 18, 6.6% from 18 to 24, 28.9% from 25 to 44, 20.8% from 45 to 64, and 27.6% who were 65 years of age or older. The median age was 44 years. For every 100 females, there were 82.2 males. For every 100 females age 18 and over, there were 78.9 males.

The median income for a household in the city was $37,236, and the median income for a family was $51,132. Males had a median income of $37,358 versus $29,118 for females. The per capita income for the city was $24,392. About 4.6% of families and 6.3% of the population were below the poverty line, including 6.3% of those under age 18 and 9.1% of those age 65 or over.

== Schools ==
Mayfield Heights is a part of the Mayfield City School District, along with Highland Heights, Mayfield Village, and Gates Mills.

== Notable people ==
- Matt Prater, NFL player
- Lauren Underwood, U.S. representative for Illinois
