= Highland Heights, Ohio =

- City
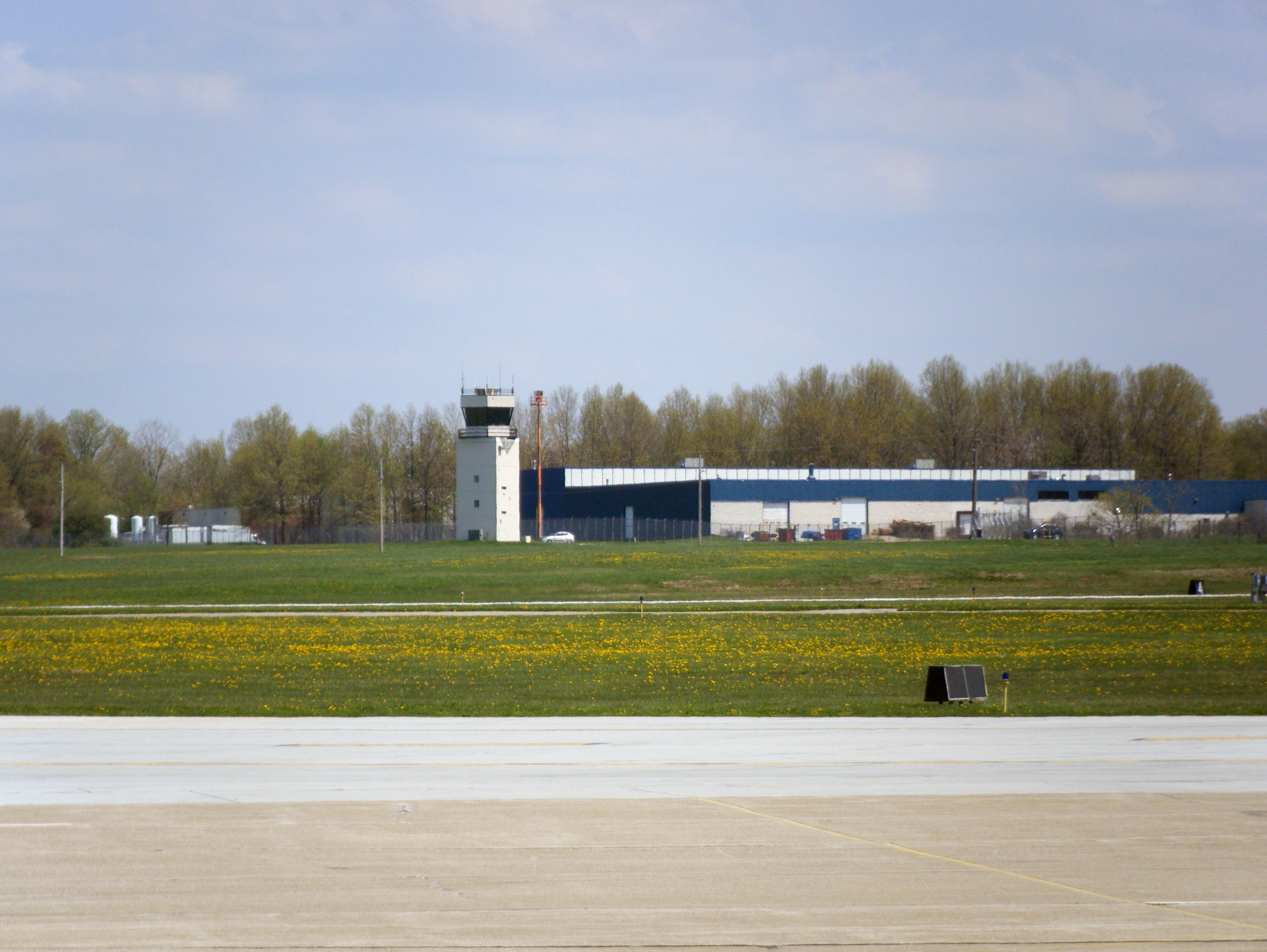
- Control tower at the Cuyahoga County Airport

- Seal
- Motto(s): The City with Pride and Promise
- Interactive map of Highland Heights, Ohio
- Location within Ohio Location within the United States
- Coordinates: 41°33′9″N 81°28′41″W
- Country: United States
- State: Ohio
- County: Cuyahoga
- Founded: 1920
- Incorporated: 1967

Government
  - Mayor: Chuck Brunello (R)

Area
  - Total: 5.15 sq mi (13.34 km^{2})
  - Land: 5.15 sq mi (13.34 km^{2})
  - Water: 0 sq mi (0.00 km^{2})
- Elevation: 935 ft (285 m)

Population (2020)
  - Total: 8,719
  - Estimate (2023): 8,537
  - Density: 1,693.2/sq mi (653.74/km^{2})
- Time zone: UTC-5 (EST)
  - Summer (DST): UTC-4 (EDT)
- ZIP Code: 44143
- Area code: 440
- FIPS code: 39-35252
- GNIS feature ID: 1041556
- Website: www.highlandhtsohio.gov

Highland Heights is a city in Cuyahoga County, Ohio, United States. The city's population was 8,719 as of the 2020 census. An eastern suburb of Cleveland, it is part of the Cleveland metropolitan area.

== History ==
Highland Heights was originally part of Mayfield Township. Highland Heights used to be home to the Front Row Theater, which operated between 1974 and 1993. In 1988, musician Roy Orbison played his last show there, two days prior to his death.

Highland Heights was the first city in Cuyahoga County to require new residential neighborhoods to have underground wiring and ornamental lamp posts.

== Geography ==
Highland Heights is located at 41°33′04″N 81°28′17″W (41.551051, -81.471273). According to the United States Census Bureau, the city has a total area of 5.15 square miles (13.34 km^{2}), all land.

== Demographics ==
Historical population
Census	Pop.	Note	%±
1930	281		—
1940	356		26.7%
1950	762		114.0%
1960	2,929		284.4%
1970	5,926		102.3%
1980	5,739		−3.2%
1990	6,249		8.9%
2000	8,082		29.3%
2010	8,345		3.3%
2020	8,719		4.5%
2023 (est.)	8,537		−2.1%

91.1% spoke English, 3.9% Italian, 1.8% Chinese, 1.2% Russian, and 0.8% spoke German at home, 0.02% Urdu.

=== Racial and ethnic composition ===
Highland Heights city, Ohio – Racial and ethnic composition Note: the US Census treats Hispanic/Latino as an ethnic category. This table excludes Latinos from the racial categories and assigns them to a separate category. Hispanics/Latinos may be of any race.
Race / Ethnicity (NH = Non-Hispanic)	Pop 2000	Pop 2010	Pop 2020	% 2000	% 2010	% 2020
White alone (NH)	7,501	7,496	7,489	92.81%	89.83%	85.89%
Black or African American alone (NH)	110	151	265	1.36%	1.81%	3.04%
Native American or Alaska Native alone (NH)	1	10	4	0.01%	0.12%	0.05%
Asian alone (NH)	372	483	598	4.60%	5.79%	6.86%
Native Hawaiian or Pacific Islander alone (NH)	0	0	0	0.00%	0.00%	0.00%
Other race alone (NH)	2	15	9	0.02%	0.18%	0.10%
Mixed race or Multiracial (NH)	60	74	188	0.74%	0.89%	2.16%
Hispanic or Latino (any race)	36	116	166	0.45%	1.39%	1.90%
Total	8,082	8,345	8,719	100.00%	100.00%	100.00%

=== 2020 census ===
As of the 2020 census, Highland Heights had a population of 8,719. The median age was 49.3 years. 20.1% of residents were under the age of 18 and 25.1% of residents were 65 years of age or older. For every 100 females there were 96.2 males, and for every 100 females age 18 and over there were 93.2 males age 18 and over.

100.0% of residents lived in urban areas, while 0.0% lived in rural areas.

There were 3,369 households in Highland Heights, of which 28.1% had children under the age of 18 living in them. Of all households, 66.1% were married-couple households, 10.4% were households with a male householder and no spouse or partner present, and 20.3% were households with a female householder and no spouse or partner present. About 20.0% of all households were made up of individuals and 12.3% had someone living alone who was 65 years of age or older.

There were 3,500 housing units, of which 3.7% were vacant. The homeowner vacancy rate was 1.2% and the rental vacancy rate was 5.6%.

Racial composition as of the 2020 census
Race	Number	Percent
White	7,538	86.5%
Black or African American	266	3.1%
American Indian and Alaska Native	7	0.1%
Asian	598	6.9%
Native Hawaiian and Other Pacific Islander	0	0.0%
Some other race	26	0.3%
Two or more races	284	3.3%
Hispanic or Latino (of any race)	166	1.9%

=== 2010 census ===
As of the census of 2010, there were 8,345 people, 3,205 households, and 2,481 families living in the city. The population density was 1,620.4 inhabitants per square mile (625.6/km^{2}). There were 3,405 housing units at an average density of 661.2 per square mile (255.3/km^{2}). The racial makeup of the city was 91.0% White, 1.9% African American, 0.1% Native American, 5.8% Asian, 0.3% from other races, and 0.9% from two or more races. Hispanic or Latino of any race were 1.4% of the population.

Of the city's population over the age of 25, 50.9% held a bachelor's degree or higher.

There were 3,205 households, of which 31.0% had children under the age of 18 living with them, 67.6% were married couples living together, 7.1% had a female householder with no husband present, 2.7% had a male householder with no wife present, and 22.6% were non-families. 20.5% of all households were made up of individuals, and 11.6% had someone living alone who was 65 years of age or older. The average household size was 2.60 and the average family size was 3.01.

The median age in the city was 48.2 years. 21.8% of residents were under the age of 18; 6.2% were between the ages of 18 and 24; 16.9% were from 25 to 44; 35% were from 45 to 64; and 20% were 65 years of age or older. The gender makeup of the city was 49.2% male and 50.8% female.

=== 2000 census ===
As of the census of 2000, there were 8,082 people, 2,779 households, and 2,309 families living in the city. The population density was 1,575.0 inhabitants per square mile (608.1/km^{2}). There were 2,862 housing units at an average density of 557.8 per square mile (215.4/km^{2}). The racial makeup of the city was 93.18% White, 1.39% African American, 0.01% Native American, 4.60% Asian, 0.06% from other races, and 0.75% from two or more races. Hispanic or Latino of any race were 0.45% of the population.

There were 2,779 households, out of which 36.6% had children under the age of 18 living with them, 74.5% were married couples living together, 6.6% had a female householder with no husband present, and 16.9% were non-families. 15.7% of all households were made up of individuals, and 9.2% had someone living alone who was 65 years of age or older. The average household size was 2.89 and the average family size was 3.24.

In the city the population was spread out, with 26.8% under the age of 18, 6.1% from 18 to 24, 22.3% from 25 to 44, 27.2% from 45 to 64, and 17.6% who were 65 years of age or older. The median age was 42 years. For every 100 females, there were 95.5 males. For every 100 females age 18 and over, there were 92.0 males.

The median income for a household in the city was $69,750, and the median income for a family was $78,922. Males had a median income of $56,250 versus $33,277 for females. The per capita income for the city was $31,184. About 3.1% of families and 4.0% of the population were below the poverty line, including 3.8% of those under age 18 and 3.1% of those age 65 or over.

== Sports ==
Highland Heights is home to the Stonewater Golf Club, where several tournaments of the Nationwide Tour were held.

== Education ==
Highland Heights is a part of the Mayfield City School District, along with Mayfield Heights, Mayfield Village, and Gates Mills.

Highland Heights is home to Mayfield's largest elementary school, Millridge Elementary, and CEVEC (Cuyahoga East Vocational Education Consortium). The local Catholic parish, St. Paschal-Baylon, also runs a preschool-8th grade school.
