= Gates Mills, Ohio =

- Village
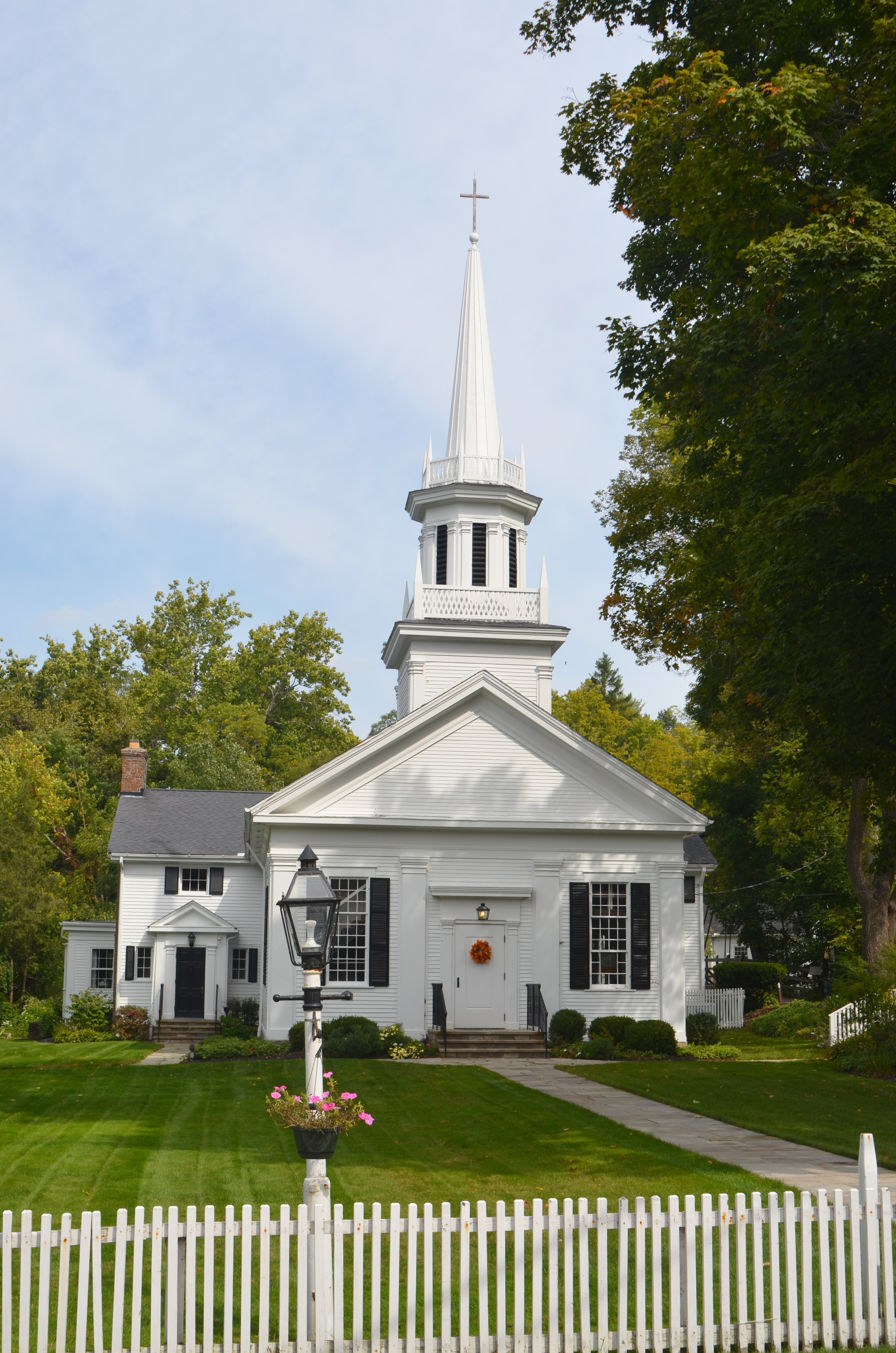
- Gates Mills Methodist Episcopal Church

- Seal
- Interactive map of Gates Mills, Ohio
- Location within Ohio Location within the United States
- Coordinates: 41°31′57″N 81°24′38″W
- Country: United States
- State: Ohio
- County: Cuyahoga
- Founded: 1826
- Incorporated: 1920

Government
  - Mayor: Steven Siemborski (R)

Area
  - Total: 9.11 sq mi (23.60 km^{2})
  - Land: 8.98 sq mi (23.26 km^{2})
  - Water: 0.13 sq mi (0.34 km^{2})
- Elevation: 719 ft (219 m)

Population (2020)
  - Total: 2,264
  - Estimate (2023): 2,227
  - Density: 252.1/sq mi (97.32/km^{2})
- Time zone: UTC-5 (EST)
  - Summer (DST): UTC-4 (EDT)
- ZIP code: 44040
- Area code: 440
- FIPS code: 39-29498
- GNIS feature ID: 1064705
- Website: https://www.gatesmillsvillage.com/

Gates Mills is a village in eastern Cuyahoga County, Ohio, United States. A suburb of Cleveland, it is part of the Cleveland metropolitan area. The population was 2,264 at the 2020 census.

== History ==
Gates Mills was originally part of Mayfield Township. The village was named for Halsey Gates, the proprietor of a local watermill.

== Geography ==
According to the United States Census Bureau, the village has a total area of 9.10 square miles (23.57 km^{2}), of which 8.97 square miles (23.23 km^{2}) is land and 0.13 square miles (0.34 km^{2}) is water.

== Demographics ==
Historical population
Census	Pop.	Note	%±
1880	99		—
1930	581		—
1940	906		55.9%
1950	1,056		16.6%
1960	1,588		50.4%
1970	2,378		49.7%
1980	2,236		−6.0%
1990	2,508		12.2%
2000	2,493		−0.6%
2010	2,270		−8.9%
2020	2,264		−0.3%
2023 (est.)	2,227	▼	−1.6%
U.S. Decennial Census

=== 2020 census ===
Gates Mills village, Ohio – Racial and ethnic composition Note: the US Census treats Hispanic/Latino as an ethnic category. This table excludes Latinos from the racial categories and assigns them to a separate category. Hispanics/Latinos may be of any race.
Race / Ethnicity (NH = Non-Hispanic)	Pop 2000	Pop 2010	Pop 2020	% 2000	% 2010	% 2020
White alone (NH)	2,316	2,069	1,998	92.90%	91.15%	88.25%
Black or African American alone (NH)	23	30	52	0.92%	1.32%	2.30%
Native American or Alaska Native alone (NH)	5	3	2	0.20%	0.13%	0.09%
Asian alone (NH)	87	91	84	3.49%	4.01%	3.71%
Native Hawaiian or Pacific Islander alone (NH)	0	0	0	0.00%	0.00%	0.00%
Other race alone (NH)	2	7	8	0.08%	0.31%	0.35%
Mixed race or Multiracial (NH)	20	27	63	0.80%	1.19%	2.78%
Hispanic or Latino (any race)	40	43	57	1.60%	1.89%	2.52%
Total	2,493	2,270	2,264	100.00%	100.00%	100.00%

=== 2010 census ===
As of the census of 2010, there were 2,270 people, 919 households, and 698 families living in the village. The population density was 253.1 inhabitants per square mile (97.7/km^{2}). There were 992 housing units at an average density of 110.6 per square mile (42.7/km^{2}). The racial makeup of the village was 93.0% White, 1.3% African American, 0.1% Native American, 4.0% Asian, 0.4% from other races, and 1.2% from two or more races. Hispanic or Latino of any race were 1.9% of the population.

There were 919 households, of which 23.3% had children under the age of 18 living with them, 68.8% were married couples living together, 4.7% had a female householder with no husband present, 2.5% had a male householder with no wife present, and 24.0% were non-families. 21.7% of all households were made up of individuals, and 10.2% had someone living alone who was 65 years of age or older. The average household size was 2.45 and the average family size was 2.84.

The median age in the village was 52.5 years. 18.2% of residents were under the age of 18; 6% were between the ages of 18 and 24; 13.4% were from 25 to 44; 39% were from 45 to 64; and 23.4% were 65 years of age or older. The gender makeup of the village was 50.7% male and 49.3% female.

=== 2000 census ===
As of the census of 2000, there were 2,493 people, 925 households, and 750 families living in the village. The population density was 274.2 inhabitants per square mile (105.9/km^{2}). There were 974 housing units at an average density of 107.1 per square mile (41.4/km^{2}). The racial makeup of the village was 94.10% White, 0.92% African American, 0.20% Native American, 3.49% Asian, 0.12% from other races, and 1.16% from two or more races. Hispanic or Latino of any race were 1.60% of the population.

There were 925 households, out of which 33.1% had children under the age of 18 living with them, 74.9% were married couples living together, 4.5% had a female householder with no husband present, and 18.9% were non-families. 16.8% of all households were made up of individuals, and 7.7% had someone living alone who was 65 years of age or older. The average household size was 2.67 and the average family size was 3.00.

In the village, the population was spread out, with 24.1% under the age of 18, 4.8% from 18 to 24, 17.6% from 25 to 44, 35.3% from 45 to 64, and 18.2% who were 65 years of age or older. The median age was 47 years. For every 100 females there were 97.4 males. For every 100 females age 18 and over, there were 94.9 males.

The median income for a household in the village was $133,605, and the median income for a family was $161,350. Males had a median income of $100,000 versus $50,761 for females. The per capita income for the village was $74,732. About 1.0% of families and 1.1% of the population were below the poverty line, including none of those under age 18 and 4.1% of those age 65 or over.

== Education ==
Gates Mills is a part of the Mayfield City School District, along with being Highland Heights, Mayfield Heights, and Mayfield Village. Gates Mills is home to one of Mayfield's smallest elementary schools, Gates Mills Elementary.

One private school, Gilmour Academy, is located in Gates Mills. Gilmour is a Roman Catholic college preparatory school with a lower, middle, and high school on one campus. The upper school campus for Hawken School has a Gates Mills mailing address, but is actually located in neighboring Chester Township.

== Notable people ==
- Eric Carmen, singer/songwriter
- Lauren Davis, professional tennis player
- Bob Feller, Hall of Fame pitcher for the Cleveland Indians
- Naz Hillmon, University of Michigan basketball player who attended Gilmour Academy
- O. J. McDuffie, wide receiver for the Miami Dolphins
- Barbara Roads, labor activist and flight attendant
- Phoebe Robinson comedian and New York Times best-selling writer attended high school in Gates Mills
- Melanie Valerio, gold-medal-winning 4 x 100 Freestyle Relay swimmer at the 1996 Summer Olympics
- Mo Vaughn, First baseman and Designated hitter for the Boston Red Sox, Los Angeles Angels of Anaheim and New York Mets, 1995 Major League Baseball MVP
