= ICN Radio =

Italian-language radio station in New York City

- Westwood, New Jersey (1983–2025) Manhattan, New York (2025–present); United States
- Frequencies: Internet radio (icnradio.com); formerly 67 kHz subcarrier of WBGO (88.3 FM), Newark, New Jersey

Programming
- Affiliations: America Oggi News Agency, La Voce di New York, RAI International

Ownership
- Owner: Gruppo Editoriale Oggi (2006–2023); Anthony Pasquale (2023–2025); VNY Media Corp. (2025–present)

Links
- Website: icnradio.com

ICN Radio (Italian Communication Network) is an Italian-language internet radio station serving the New York metropolitan area, operated by VNY Media Corp..

== History ==
ICN Radio began broadcasting in 1983, founded by Sal Palmeri as part of the America Oggi media group. From 2006 it was formally owned by America Oggi, then the only Italian-language daily newspaper in the United States, and transmitted on the 67 kHz subcarrier of WBGO (88.3 FM) before moving to internet-only broadcasting.

In 2023, when the America Oggi group wound down its print operations, the station passed to the independent management of Anthony Pasquale. In June 2025 it was acquired by VNY Media Corp., publisher of La Voce di New York, together with America Oggi itself.

== See also ==
- America Oggi
- La Voce di New York
