= Byers Field =

Multi-use stadium located in Parma, Ohio

Coordinates: 41°22′55″N 81°44′13″W

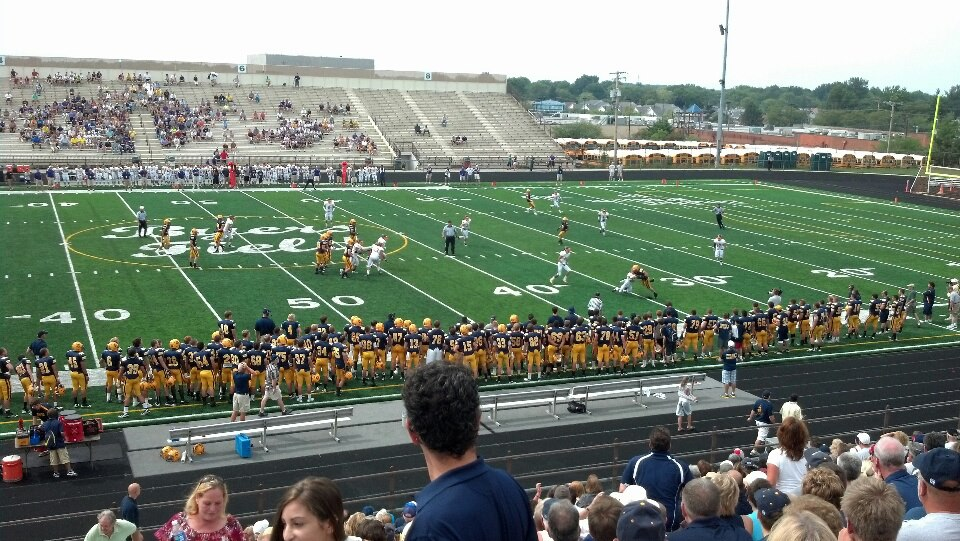
Byers Field

Byers Field is a 12,750-capacity multi-purpose stadium in Parma, Ohio, located on Day Drive next to The Shoppes at Parma. The stadium can host football, track and field, and soccer events. The three high schools and three middle schools of the Parma City School District share this venue with Saint Ignatius High School.

== 1930s Construction and 1953 Naming for Carl C. Byers ==
Originally known as "Ridge Road Stadium," the facility was built in the 1930s as a Works Progress Administration project. It received an early 1950s renovation and upgrades, and was named for Carl C. Byers early in 1953. Byers, a Logan (Ohio) native, was hired as the Parma Schools' Superintendent in mid-1942, at which time the city's population of 18,000 included 3,500 K-12 students attending its four elementary schools, a junior high, and Parma-Schaaf High School. The early-1950s renovations cost $150,000, and it was estimated in 1953 that duplicating the facility would cost $750,000—about $9 million in equivalent 2025 dollars.

Byers, who died in 1969, served the Parma Schools through the 1956-57 school year, by which time total enrollment had grown to 14,300.

== Tenants ==
Byers Field plays host to many high schools and middle schools home stadiums. These include Normandy High School, Valley Forge High School, Hillside Middle School, Greenbriar Middle School, and Shiloh Middle School. It is also home to Pop Warner football games, and Tri City Youth Football League games.

It is also home to Cleveland's women's professional football team. Beginning in the summer of 2012, Byers field also served as home to the NPSL's AFC Cleveland Royals.

== Bleachers ==
The home team's bleachers are on the east side of the stadium. The west side bleachers accommodate the visiting team.

== Press box and loges ==
The press box is located on the east side of the stadium. The press box is divided into three separate sections. One section is for the announcer and scoreboard controller. The other two sections are enclosed rooms for the teams to call plays down to the field for football. On top of the press box is a video section that can accommodate up to five cameras for television broadcasts. There are also two loges, one on each side of the press box. Each loge can hold up to 40 people, and each is climate-controlled. In addition, each has a microwave, a refrigerator, and two television sets outfitted with cable access. There is also a section for the camera crew to control the video replay board.

== Concession stands ==
The stadium has two concession stands: one underneath the east bleachers and one at the southwest corner of the stadium.

== Restrooms ==
The stadium has restrooms underneath the east side bleachers along with a family restroom. There are also restrooms underneath the west side bleachers. Also portable restrooms on the northwest corner of the stadium. In 2008 the original east side restrooms from 1962 received a $790,708 renovation.

== Locker rooms ==
Both locker rooms are located underneath the east side bleachers.

== Video replay board ==
An electronic scoreboard was originally installed at Byers Field in 1993, as part of an agreement between the school District and a soda vending company. Since 1993, various electrical components of the scoreboard had become inoperable and expensive to repair. At times the board had stopped working all together. A new LED video scoreboard was constructed at the north end of Byers Field in 2008. The new board allows for video advertising as well as providing video of the sporting events on the field. Advertising revenue will be the source of revenue to support the cost of this board, along with a $75,000.00 donation from the Friends of Byers Field organization. The board cost $794,378.

== Field surface and track ==
The field is turf along with a new asphalt based rubberized track. The original cinder track was installed in 1954. The cinder track was converted to an asphalt based rubberized track in 1993, since then the topcoat developed cracks and surface areas became unstable, with numerous patch repairs. The track was completely resurfaced with a new rubberized topcoat in 2008 costing $134,095.

== Gates ==
There are two entry/exit gates. The main gate is located behind the south endzone and a secondary gate is at the north end of the stadium.

== Parking ==
There is parking on the south and east side of the stadium.

== Events ==
The venue plays host to high school and middle school football games both regular season and playoff games. The stadium has hosted OHSAA state semi-final football playoff games. There are also soccer games and track and field events. It also hosts Pop Warner Football games and Tri City Youth Football Games.

Cleveland's professional women's football team plays here. Byers Field also served as home to the NPSL's AFC Cleveland Royals during its inaugural 2012 season.

== Capacity ==
The stadium has a capacity of 12,750.

== Facts ==
Byers Field is the second largest football venue in Cuyahoga County behind only Huntington Bank Field, the home of the Cleveland Browns.

== Rededication ==
The stadium was dedicated to Bob Boulton and is now called Byers Field at Bob Boulton Stadium.

== Byers Field Foundation ==
The Stadium is run by The Byers Field Foundation.
