= Great Lakes Conference =

The Great Lakes Conference was an Ohio High School Athletic Conference athletic league, that began conference play in 2015 and disbanded in 2024 and was made up of member schools from Cuyahoga, Medina and Lorain Counties in Ohio.

.

== All members ==
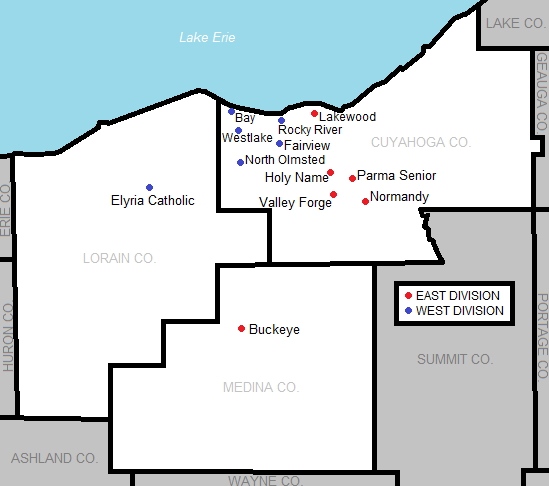
GLC membership and divisional setup starting with the 2021-22 school year.

School	Nickname	Location	Colors	Tenure	Division	Notes
Bay	Rockets	Bay Village, Ohio	Blue, White, & Red	2015-2024	West	left for Cleveland West Conference
Buckeye	Bucks	York Township, Ohio	Brown, Orange, & White	2019-2024	East	left for Cleveland West Conference
Elyria Catholic	Panthers	Elyria, Ohio	Green & White	2015-2024	West	left for North Coast Conference
Fairview	Warriors	Fairview Park, Ohio	Scarlet & Gray	2019-2023	West	Left for Chagrin Valley Conference
Holy Name	Green Wave	Parma Heights, Ohio	Green & White	2015-2024	East	left for North Coast Conference
Lakewood	Rangers	Lakewood, Ohio	Purple & Gold	2020-2024	East	left for Cleveland West Conference
Normandy	Invaders	Parma, Ohio	Orange & White	2015-2024	East	left for Cleveland West Conference
North Olmsted	Eagles	North Olmsted, Ohio	Orange & Black	2021-2024	West	left for Cleveland West Conference
Parma Senior	Redmen	Parma, Ohio	Red & Gray	2015-2023	East	school closed
Rocky River	Pirates	Rocky River, Ohio	Maroon & White	2015-2024	West	left for Cleveland West Conference
Valley Forge	Patriots	Parma Heights, Ohio	Navy Blue & White	2015-2024	East	left for Cleveland West Conference
Westlake	Demons	Westlake, Ohio	Forest Green & White	2021-2024	West	left for Cleveland West Conference

== History ==
The Great Lakes Conference was formed in 2015, with its founding members of Normandy, Parma, Valley Forge Bay, Elyria Catholic, Rocky River and Holy Name.

The league added Buckeye and Fairview in 2019. Buckeye and Fairview were two of four schools being left out after eight of the 12 Patriot Athletic Conference schools decided to form a new league with more compact traveling distances.

In 2019, Lakewood would announce their intention to join the Great Lakes Conference beginning the 2020-21 school year.

In 2020, the GLC split into two separate divisions following the additions of North Olmsted and Westlake in the 2021-22 school year. The East Division consisted of Buckeye, Holy Name, Lakewood, Normandy, Parma, and Valley Forge; the West Division consisted of Bay, Elyria Catholic, Fairview, North Olmsted, Rocky River, and Westlake.

In June 2022, Parma City Schools approved a consolidation plan that would close Parma Senior High School along with two elementary schools following the 2022-23 school year, ending Parmas tenure in the GLC.

In March 2023, Fairview announced that they would be joining the Chagrin Valley Conference starting with the winter sports season of the 2023-2024 school year. This came following a concern that Fairview would be "the smallest public school in an increasingly growing pool of larger ones."

In May 2023, eight GLC members (Bay, Buckeye, Lakewood, Normandy, North Olmsted, Rocky River, Valley Forge, and Westlake) announced that they would be leaving to form the Cleveland West Conference starting the 2024-2025 school year. With only two schools in the GLC remaining, Elyria Catholic and Holy Name would leave from the North Coast Conference along with five other schools, which would lead to the end of the Great Lakes Conference.
