= Jim Fritzsche =

American football player (born 1960)

No. 72
- Position: Offensive tackle

Personal information
- Born: October 11, 1960 (age 66); Parma, Ohio, U.S.
- Listed height: 6 ft 8 in (2.03 m)
- Listed weight: 265 lb (120 kg)

Career information
- High school: Valley Forge (Parma Heights, Ohio)
- College: Purdue
- NFL draft: 1982: 8th round, 217th overall pick

Career history
- Philadelphia Eagles (1982–1983)
- Stats at Pro Football Reference

James Brian Fritzsche (born October 11, 1960) is an American former professional football offensive tackle who played for the Philadelphia Eagles of the National Football League (NFL). He played college football for the Purdue Boilermakers and was selected by the Eagles in the eighth round of the 1982 NFL draft.

== Early life ==
James Brian Fritzsche was born on October 11, 1960, in Parma, Ohio. He attended Valley Forge High School in Parma Heights, Ohio.

== College career ==
Fritzsche enrolled at Purdue University to play college football for the Boilermakers. He was a four-year letterman from 1978 to 1981. He was the starting left tackle his senior year in 1981. He originally majored in management in college but switched to building construction.

== Professional career ==
Fritzsche was selected by the Philadelphia Eagles in the eighth round, with the 217th overall pick, of the 1982 NFL draft. On September 6, he was placed on injured reserve, where he spent the entire 1982 season. He played in 15 games for the Eagles in 1983 as a reserve offensive tackle while returning two kicks for 17 yards. Fritzsche was released on August 27, 1984, after the fourth preseason game.
