= John Choma (American football) =

American football player (born 1955)

No. 60, 78
- Position: Offensive linemen

Personal information
- Born: February 9, 1955 (age 71); Cleveland, Ohio, U.S.
- Listed height: 6 ft 5 in (1.96 m)
- Listed weight: 261 lb (118 kg)

Career information
- High school: Normandy (Parma, Ohio)
- College: Virginia
- NFL draft: 1978: 5th round, 135th overall pick

Career history
- San Diego Chargers (1978); Kansas City Chiefs (1979); San Francisco 49ers (1981–1983)

Awards and highlights
- Super Bowl champion (XVI)

Career NFL statistics
- Games played: 27
- Stats at Pro Football Reference

John Gregory Choma (born February 9, 1955) is an American former professional football player who was an offensive linemen for three seasons with the San Francisco 49ers of the National Football League (NFL). He was selected by the San Diego Chargers in the fifth round of the 1978 NFL draft. He played college football for the Virginia Cavaliers. He was a member of the 49ers team that won Super Bowl XVI.

== Early life and college ==
John Gregory Choma was born on February 9, 1955, in Cleveland, Ohio. He attended Normandy High School in Parma, Ohio.

He played college football for the Virginia Cavaliers from 1974 to 1977 and was a three-year letterman from 1975 to 1977.

== Professional career ==
Choma was selected by the San Diego Chargers in the fifth round, with the 135th overall pick, of the 1978 NFL draft. On August 28, 1978, he was placed on injured reserve and spent the entire 1978 season there. He was released on August 27, 1979.

Choma signed with the Kansas City Chiefs on December 12, 1979, but did not appear in any games during the 1979 season. He was released on August 19, 1980.

Choma was signed by the San Francisco 49ers on February 24, 1981. He played in 14 games during the 1981 season. He also played in three postseason games that season, including the victory over the Cincinnati Bengals in Super Bowl XVI. He appeared in seven games in 1982. Choma was released by the 49ers on August 23, 1983, but later re-signed. He played in six games in 1983.
