= Cleveland West Conference =

US high school athletics conference

The Cleveland West Conference is an Ohio High School Athletic Association athletics conference that began play with the 2024–25 school year and is made up of member schools from Cuyahoga and Medina counties in Ohio.

== Members ==
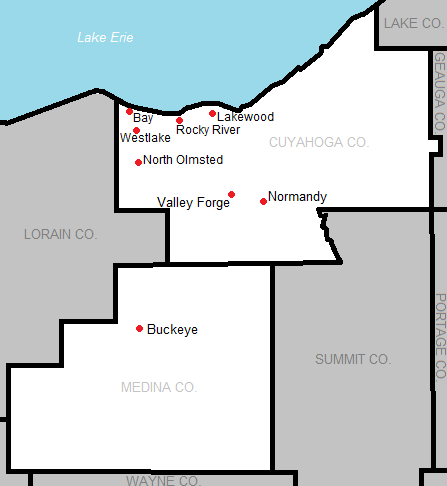
Map of the Cleveland West Conference members

School	Nickname	Location	Colors	Tenure	Notes
Bay	Rockets	Bay Village	Blue, white, & red	2024–	
Buckeye	Bucks	York Township	Brown, orange, & white	2024–	
Lakewood	Rangers	Lakewood	Purple & gold	2024–	
Normandy	Invaders	Parma	Orange & white	2024–	
North Olmsted	Eagles	North Olmsted	Orange & black	2024–	
Rocky River	Pirates	Rocky River	Maroon & white	2024–	
Valley Forge	Patriots	Parma Heights	Navy blue & white	2024–	
Westlake	Demons	Westlake	Forest green & white	2024–	

== History ==
The Cleveland West Conference began conference play starting the 2024–25 school year. All eight schools were originally members of the Great Lakes Conference, which was operated from 2015 until 2024. Founding members of the Cleveland West Conference includes Bay, Buckeye, Lakewood, Normandy, North Olmsted, Rocky River, Valley Forge, and Westlake
