= Jamie Meder =

American football player (born 1991)

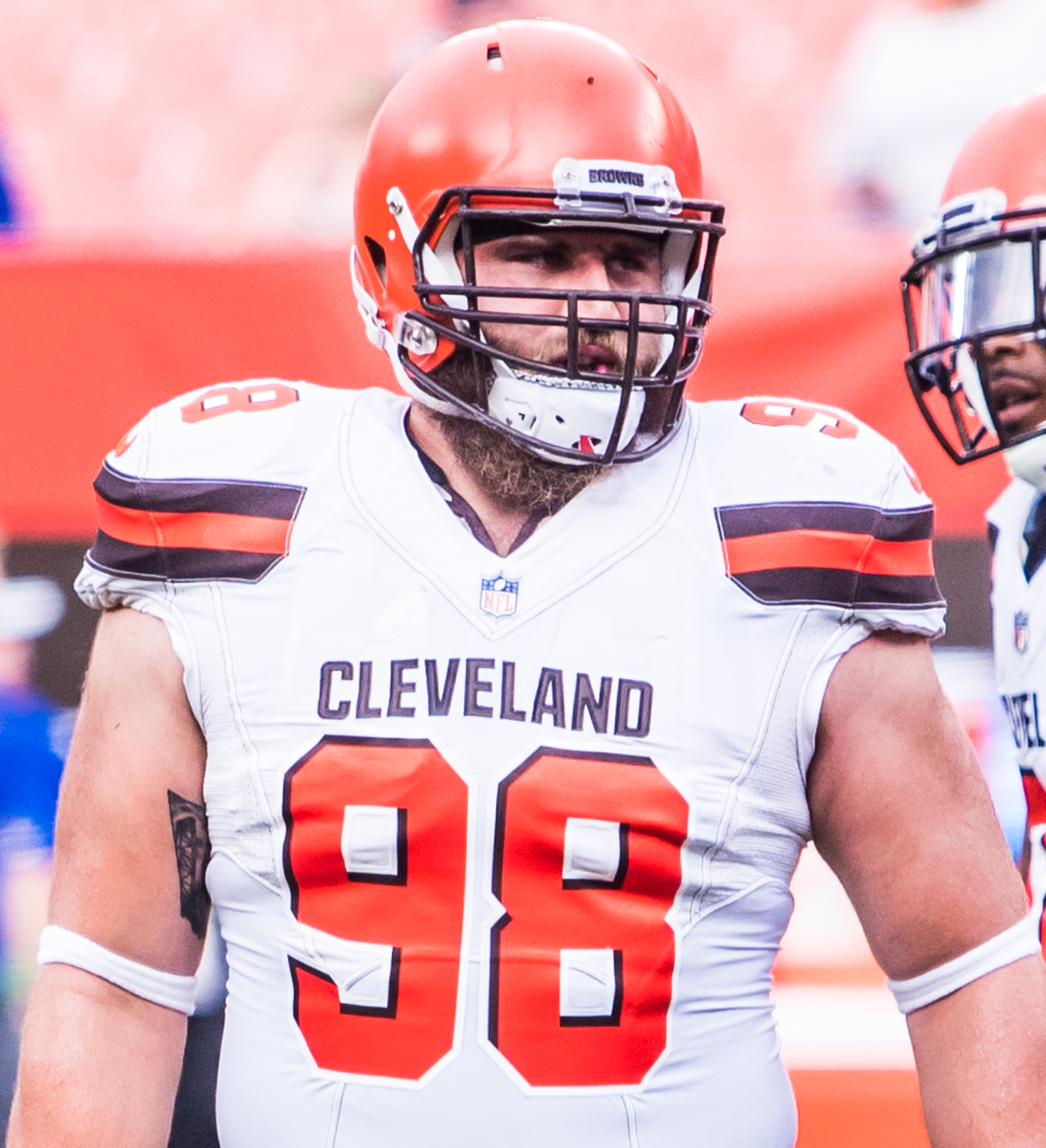
- Meder with the Cleveland Browns in 2018

No. 66, 98, 61
- Position: Defensive tackle

Personal information
- Born: April 12, 1991 (age 35); Cleveland, Ohio, U.S.
- Listed height: 6 ft 2 in (1.88 m)
- Listed weight: 308 lb (140 kg)

Career information
- High school: Valley Forge (Parma Heights, Ohio)
- College: Ashland
- NFL draft: 2014: undrafted

Career history
- Baltimore Ravens (2014)*; Cleveland Browns (2014–2017); Seattle Seahawks (2019)*; Detroit Lions (2019)
- * Offseason or practice squad member only

Career NFL statistics
- Total tackles: 95
- Sacks: 2
- Stats at Pro Football Reference

James Michael Meder (born April 12, 1991) is an American former professional football player who was a defensive tackle in the National Football League (NFL). He played college football for the Ashland Eagles. He has been nicknamed "the Pierogi Prince of Parma."

== Early life ==
Meder played high school football at Valley Forge High School in Parma Heights, Ohio. He was named first-team all-conference and was tabbed the defensive player of the year as a senior. He was also named second-team All-Ohio. Meder lettered four times in wrestling and three times in football. He was a state runner-up in the OHSAA Division I heavyweight class in wrestling his senior year.

== College career ==
Meder played football for the Ashland Eagles from 2010 to 2013.

== Professional career ==
Pre-draft measurables
| Height | Weight | 40-yard dash | 10-yard split | 20-yard split | 20-yard shuttle | Three-cone drill | Vertical jump | Broad jump | Bench press |
|---|---|---|---|---|---|---|---|---|---|
| 6 ft 2 1/4 in (1.89 m) | 293 lb (133 kg) | 5.20 s | 1.89 s | 3.00 s | 4.43 s | 7.47 s | 30 in (0.76 m) | 8 ft 5 in (2.57 m) | 33 reps |
All values from Ohio State Pro Day

=== Baltimore Ravens ===
Meder signed with the Baltimore Ravens on May 11, 2014 after going undrafted in the 2014 NFL draft. He was released by the Ravens on August 30 and signed to the team's practice squad on August 31, 2014. He was released by the Ravens on November 10, 2014.

=== Cleveland Browns ===
Meder was signed to the Cleveland Browns' practice squad on November 12, 2014. He was promoted to the active roster on December 27, 2014. He made his NFL debut on December 28, 2014 against the Ravens.

On March 7, 2016, the Browns re-signed Meder. On December 24, 2016, Meder blocked a potential-game tying 32-yard field goal with 3:49 left in the game against the San Diego Chargers to help the Browns win their first game of the season and snap a 17-game losing streak. They won the game by a score of 20–17. He was then named AFC Special Teams Player of the Week, becoming the first defensive lineman in Browns history to win the award.

On November 21, 2017, Meder was placed on injured reserve with an ankle injury.

Meder was waived by the Browns on September 2, 2018.

=== Seattle Seahawks ===
On January 14, 2019, Meder signed a reserve/future contract with the Seattle Seahawks. He was released on August 31, 2019.

=== Detroit Lions ===
On December 18, 2019, Meder was signed by the Detroit Lions.
