= Xpect Discounts =

Defunct American retail chain

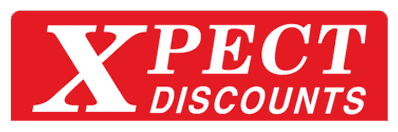
- The Xpect Discounts logo

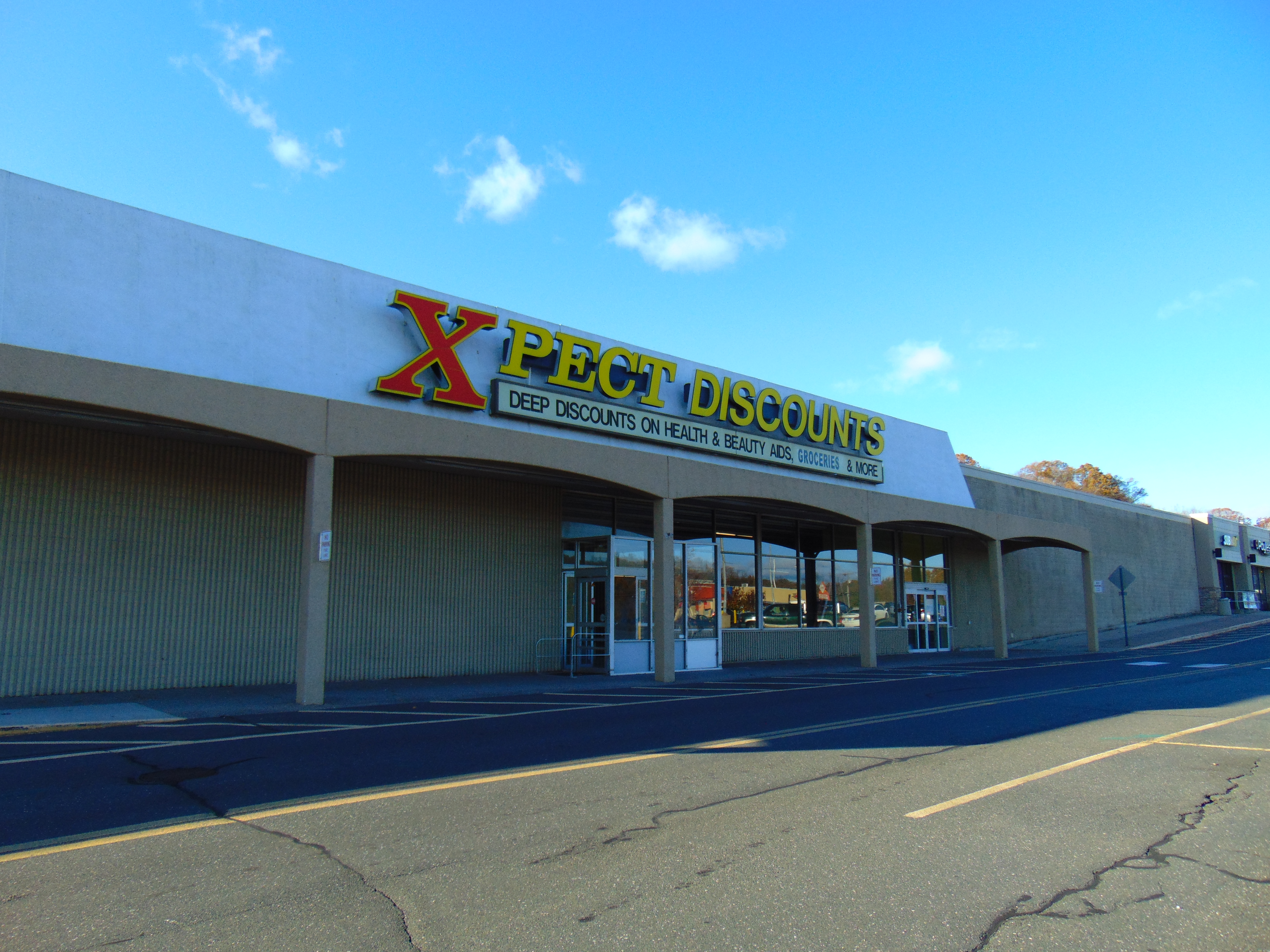
- A closed Xpect Discounts storefront in Cromwell, CT.
- Industry: Retail
- Founder: Marc Glassman
- Fate: Defunct (2016)
- Headquarters: (Formerly) North Haven, Connecticut
- Area served: Connecticut, Ohio
- Products: Discount drug and grocery
- Owner: Marc Glassman
- Website: marcs.com

Xpect Discounts was a retail chain which started as a drug store then expanding into a full grocery store, consisting of seven stores in western Connecticut operating from the 1980s-2016. Xpect Discounts was operated by Clevelander Marc Glassman, who previously founded Marc's, which currently has nearly 60 stores in the Cleveland, Akron, Canton, Youngstown and Columbus, Ohio areas.

During the recessions business slowed and the cost to operate in Connecticut continued to increase, Though still making increases in sales. Xpect began with seven stores; however, its Derby store closed in 2012, and in 2013, its North Haven store closed. Xpect began 2015 with four stores; however, its Danbury store closed on March 1. Xpect's other four stores were in East Haven, Cromwell, Danbury and Milford. In early 2015 MGI stated that the remaining three Connecticut stores would close and vacate by April 2016. In February 2016 it was announced that the remaining four stores would close by April 1.

As of April 1, 2016 all Connecticut locations have closed and Xpect Discounts stores are no longer in operation.

The retail chain once had a store in Massachusetts.
