= Normandy High School =

Normandy High School may refer to:

- Normandy High School (Missouri)
- Normandy High School (Ohio)
