= Christopher Smith (performer) =

American actor, director and improviser (born 1959)

Christopher Robin Smith (born 1959) is an American actor, director and improviser, best known for his improv workshops and his handful of appearances on Whose Line Is It Anyway?. Raised in Parma Heights, Ohio, and a graduate of Valley Forge High School (Class of 1977), Smith began performing at an early age. Appearing in many productions throughout his high school years, Smith also sang with the legendary Cleveland area rock n' roll revival group "The Fabulous Brylcreams" from 1975 through August 1978. At this time he was attending Kenyon College and singing with the Kokosingers, an a cappella group that performed both locally and throughout the United States in addition to recording two albums. After graduating from Kenyon in 1981 with a degree in English, he moved to New York City to pursue an acting career.

Smith, a graduate who part-studied at the University of Exeter in England, joined the Interplay improvisation troupe in New York City and later married its founder and director, Tamara Wilcox. The troupe gained good reviews and Smith, along with performing partner Jim Meskimen, was recruited to appear in two episodes of Whose Line Is It Anyway? when the British improvisation show filmed a season in New York. Their performances were at the more astute and polished end of the improvisation scale, although their debut was completely overshadowed by the presence of Ryan Stiles, who would later become the show's main star.

Smith and Meskimen made one more appearance on Whose Line Is It Anyway? in 1992 when the show returned to New York for a second run, and a year later, the Smiths moved to Los Angeles to begin a new improvisation group called the Really Spontaneous Theatre Company. Meskimen remains a member and the troupe continues to perform, despite the death of Tamara Wilcox-Smith in 1998.

After Meskimen failed an audition for Whose Line Is It Anyway? when it moved permanently to the USA, Smith opted not to follow suit. He has since written numerous screenplays, short stories and books, but has restricted his appearances on stage and screen, preferring instead to coach young improvisers and write.

In July 2010 and August 2011, Chris returned to Parma Heights, Ohio to reunite with his former bandmates from the Fabulous Brylcreams to raise money for the Music Department at Valley Forge High School. Both concerts were a huge success, raising money to help offset the cost of participation in music programs at the high school.
