= Buckeye High School (Medina County, Ohio) =

Secondary school in Ohio, United States

Coordinates: 41.188°N 81.928°W

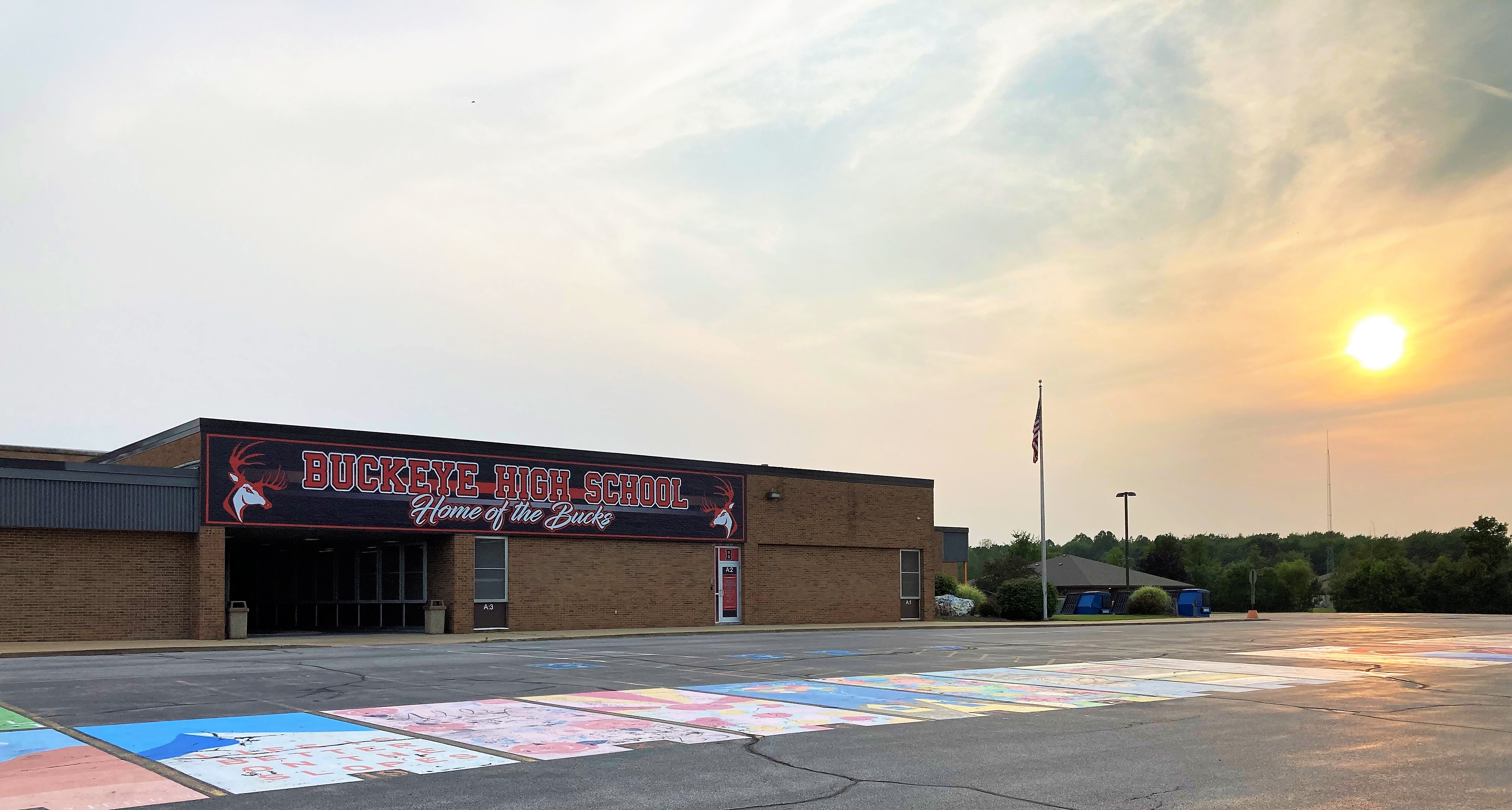
- 3084 Columbia Rd. Medina, OH 44256

Information
- Principal: Adam Snook
- Staff: 32.96 (FTE)
- Enrollment: 690 (2023-2024)
- Student to teacher ratio: 20.93
- Colors: Brown, Orange, & White
- Athletics conference: Cleveland West Conference
- Mascot: Bucky the Buck
- Nickname: Buckeye Bucks
- Newspaper: The Buckeye Buzz
- Yearbook: The Reflector
- Website: https://www.buckeyeschools.org/

Buckeye Senior High School is a public high school located in York Township, Ohio. It is located within Medina County and is the only high school within Buckeye Local School district. The school's student enrollment stays fairly constant year to year. Buckeye High School had an enrollment of 702 students in the 2021-2022 school year. A typical student day lasts from 7:20 a.m.- 2:20 p.m.

== History ==
The Junior High School that stands today, was dedicated to be the High School on November 24, 1957. The current high school was dedicated on September 16, 1973, when it was finished being built. Since then, new wings have been added to the existing building in 1978, 1979 and most recently in 2002. After the additions in 1978 and 1979 the high school had a total of 85,830 square feet. In 2002 the Buckeye School District passed a Bond Issue and underwent a huge building project. After the changes were done being made to the high school, with a total of 15,338 square feet being added, the high school now has a total of 101,168 square feet. The new wings that were added in 1978, 1979, and 2002 consisted of more classrooms and remodeling the library.

== Academic recognition ==
In the 2002–2003 school year, the school was rated "Effective" by the Ohio Department of Education. A year later in the 2003–2004 school year, the school was rated "Excellent" by the Ohio Department of Education. Since then, every school year following the 2003–2004 school year has been rated as "Excellent". Recently, in the 2010–2011 school year the school met 12 out of 12 school indicators, their performance index was a 106.8 out of 120 possible points and they met the Adequate Yearly Progress. In the 2011–2012 school year the school met 25 out of 26 state indicators giving them a 96.2% of state indicators met. Their performance index was a 103.9 and they met the Adequate Yearly Progress again.

== Clubs and activities ==
In past years due to levies failing, some clubs and activities had to be cut at Buckeye High School. However, there are still a variety of different clubs and activities available to participate in. Some of the more popular include: Student Council, Yearbook, Future Farmers of America, Musical Theatre, Academic Challenge, Mock Trial, and National Honor Society.

Student Council hosts a variety of school activities throughout the year. They hold two spirit weeks in the school year. One of them is held in the fall for Homecoming and the other is held in the spring for the Snowball dance. Both Homecoming and the Snowball dance are put on by Student Council. For Homecoming, there is a parade which features floats from other student organizations and community groups, a pep rally, a bonfire, and a powderpuff football game. Student Council also hosts two blood drives through the American Red Cross. One of the blood drives is held in the fall and the second is held in the spring. A food drive is also hosted by Student Council to help those in need.

The students in the yearbook club create the school's yearbook, The Reflector, every year. In order to do this they take pictures, write excerpts, and interview people.

Future Farmers of America, also known as F.F.A. is a very active student organization. The past two years they have sponsored "Coats for Kids". They also participate in "Cardboard City". This is where they live in cardboard boxes to experience what the homeless go through. Donations made from their "Cardboard City" go to buy Thanksgiving dinners. Also, from the various fundraisers that they put on each year they donate $200–$400 to the Children's Hospital and $200 to "CROP", a company that helps to fight hunger nationwide.

Mock trial is something that students can belong to if they wish. This is a "mock trial" that is done for educational purposes as part of a social studies class.

National Honors Society is a student organization that most high schools have. This organization does a lot to help needy families and children around the fall/winter holiday season.

== Athletic Department ==
The athletic department of Buckeye High School, was selected to receive the Harold A. Meyers Award from the Ohio High School Athletic Association for the fifth consecutive year. This award is given for excellence in sportsmanship, integrity, and ethics in high school athletics.

=== Sports ===
A variety of sports are offered at the high school including: Boys and girls cross country, boys and girls track, boys and girls soccer, football, cheerleading, Lady Bucks volleyball, baseball, softball, gymnastics, boys and girls basketball, wrestling, boys and girls golf, swimming, marching band, and bowling. However, these sports are not free, but there is a fee that is required to participate. The amounts were set in the 2010–2011 school year and have remained constant since then. For the first sport the amount to be paid is $395.00, for the second sport it is $295 and for the third sport it is $195. For families with more than one child playing sports at Buckeye High School there is a family maximum that is set at $1,600 per year. From 1953–1956 Buckeye belonged to the Medina County League. From 1957–1987, Buckeye belonged to the Inland Conference until it folded in 1987. Buckeye was Independent from 1988–1992. Buckeye belonged to the Mohican Conference from 1993–2003. Buckeye was Independent again in 2004. Buckeye belonged to the Patriot Athletic Conference from 2005–2018 (in which they were voted out due to their dominance). From 2019–2024, Buckeye belonged to the Great Lakes Conference until it folded in 2024. Buckeye then helped form the Cleveland West Conference.

Girls Volleyball:

- District Champions:2009
