= Dante Boccuzzi =

American Michelin Star chef and restaurateur

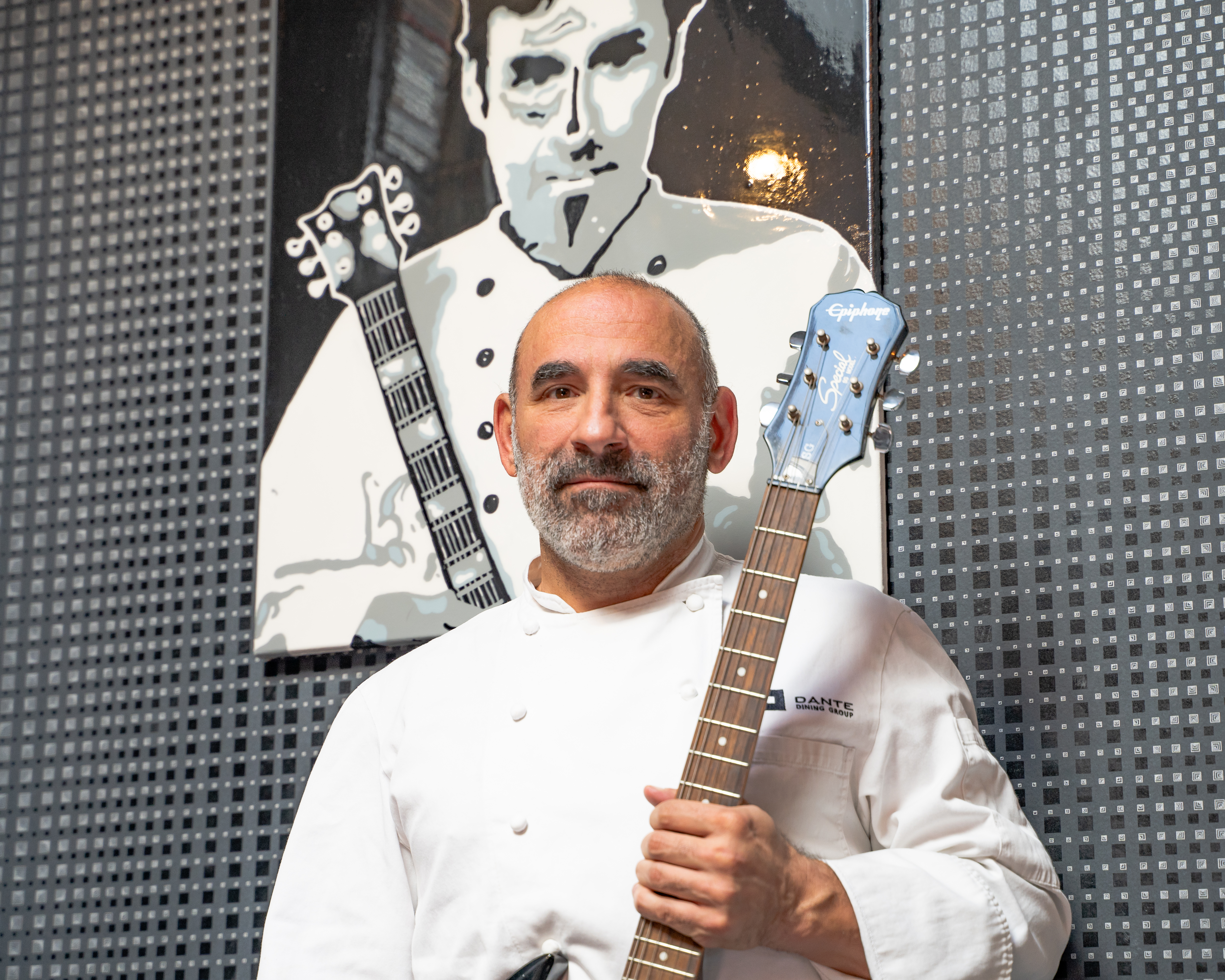
- Born: 1971 (age 54–55); Parma, Ohio, U.S.
- Education: Culinary Institute of America
- Spouse: Simone Sturgill
- Culinary career
- Cooking style: Modern American cuisine
- Current restaurants
- Dante Restaurant (2010–present); Ginko Restaurant (2011–present); Dante Next Door (2014–present); Coda Music Venue (2015–present); Dante’s Inferno at Progressive Field (2016–present); Goma by Dante (2021–present); Giappone Cocktail Lounge (2021–present); Nirvana Coffee Company (2023–present); Masu (2025–present)
- Previous restaurants
- D.C. Pasta Company (2012–2019); D.B.A. (2011–2024); Dukes N Boots (2023–2024); Inferno Nightclub (2017–2025)
- Television show
- Guy's Grocery Games

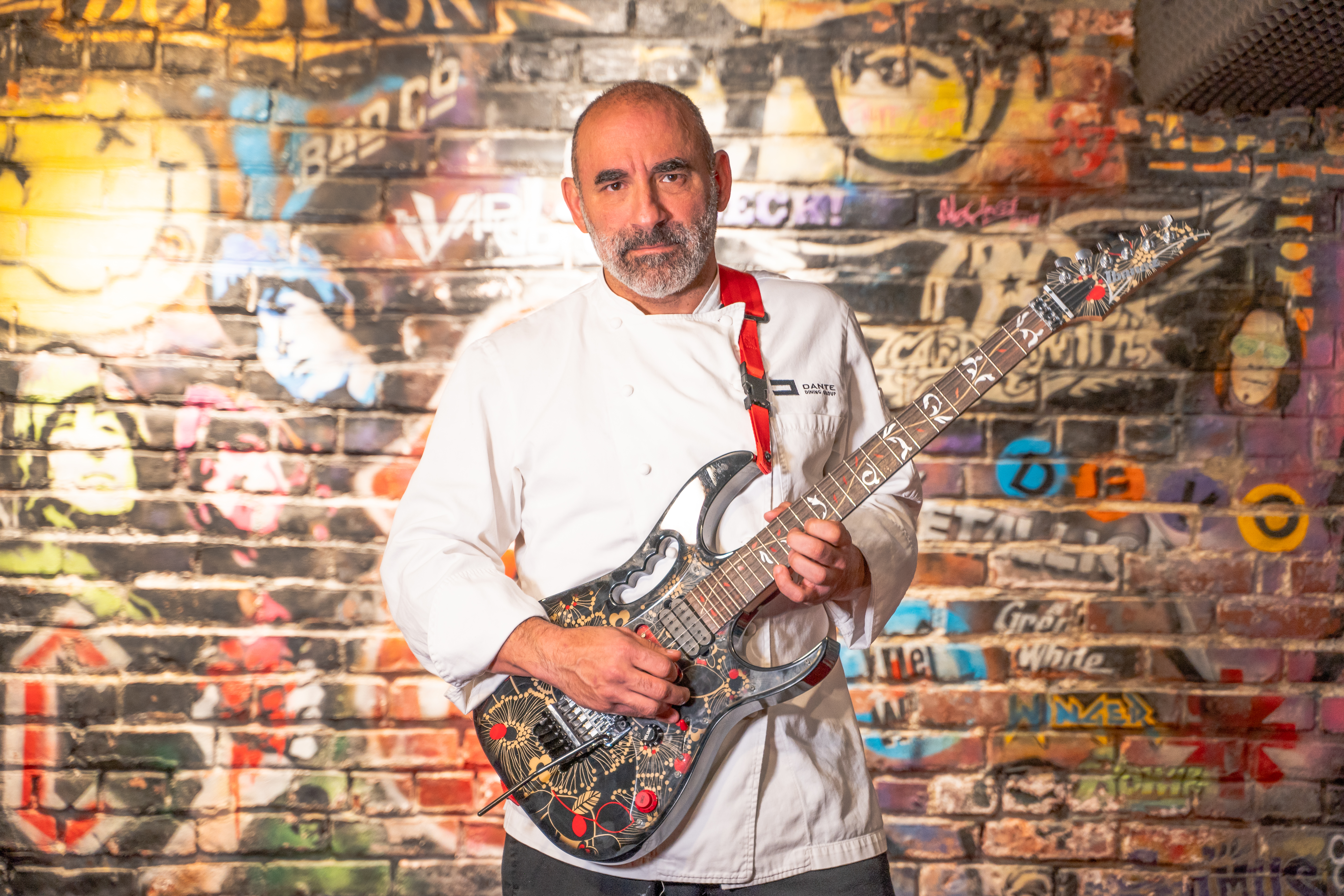

Dante Boccuzzi (born 1971) is an American chef and restaurateur who received a Michelin Star as executive chef at Aureole in New York City. His career has included the development of multiple dining and hospitality establishments in Northeast Ohio, primarily in the Cleveland area, encompassing fine dining, sushi restaurants, and entertainment venues.

In 2010, Boccuzzi returned to Ohio and opened Dante, a restaurant in Cleveland’s Tremont neighborhood. He later opened additional establishments, including the sushi restaurants Ginko and Goma, as well as the music venue Coda.

== Early career ==
Boccuzzi attended Cuyahoga Valley Christian Academy in Cuyahoga Falls, Ohio, graduating in 1989. He earned an Associate in Occupational Studies (AOS) degree in culinary arts from The Culinary Institute of America in 1991. After completing culinary school, he worked at Aureole in New York under Charlie Palmer from 1991 to 1995. His European training included work at London’s L’Escargot under chefs Gary Hollihead and David Cavalier from 1993 to 1994, as well as six months of training at Les Muscadin in Mougins, France. He later worked in Italy at L’Albereta in Erbusco under Michelin-starred chef Gualtiero Marchesi and at Aqua Marina in Sardinia under chef Antonello Colonna in 1995. From 1996 to 1997, Boccuzzi was part of the opening team at Lespinasse in Washington, D.C., under chef Gray Kunz.

After returning to the United States, he became head chef at Silks at the Mandarin Oriental Hotel. While serving as chef de cuisine, he was nominated by The James Beard Foundation for Rising Star Chef in 1998 and 1999. From 2000 to 2002, Boccuzzi worked in Italy as chef for Armani/Nobu, collaborating directly with fashion designer Giorgio Armani. He later served as executive chef at Charlie Palmer’s Aureole in New York City from 2002 to 2007, during which time the restaurant received a Michelin star.

== Restaurant career ==
In 2010, Boccuzzi opened his restaurant DANTE in the Tremont neighborhood of Cleveland, specializing in modern American cuisine. The following year, he opened Ginko, a sushi restaurant located beneath DANTE. In 2012, he expanded his operations with the opening of D.C. Pasta Co., an Italian trattoria in Strongsville, Ohio, as well as DBA (Dante Boccuzzi Akron) in Akron, Ohio. Later that year, he was nominated for the Next Generation Culinary Master Competition by Robb Report. In 2014, Boccuzzi opened DANTE Next Door, a restaurant offering traditional Italian cuisine, and subsequently appeared on season 4 of Guy’s Grocery Games. In 2015, he opened Coda, a live music venue.

In 2016, Boccuzzi opened Dante’s Inferno at Progressive Field, along with Northside Speakeasy, a craft cocktail bar located in the Courtyard Marriott hotel in downtown Akron. The following year, he opened a second location of Dante’s Inferno at the Flats East Bank development near downtown Cleveland. In July 2021, Boccuzzi opened Goma by Dante on East 4th Street in downtown Cleveland, marking his second sushi restaurant. In 2023, he founded Nirvana Coffee Company, which supplies freshly roasted coffee beans and equipment to local businesses. In May 2023, he opened Dukes ’n Boots in downtown Willoughby, Ohio. In November 2025, Boccuzzi opened Masu, a Japanese restaurant at Valor Acres in Brecksville, Ohio, operating in partnership with head sushi chef Jake McDaniel.

== Restaurants ==
=== Active ===
Name	Years active
Dante Restaurant	2010–present
Ginko Restaurant	2011–present
Dante Next Door	2014–present
Coda Music Venue	2015–present
Dante’s Inferno at Progressive Field	2016–present
Goma by Dante	2021–present
Giappone Cocktail Lounge	2021–present
Nirvana Coffee Company	2023–present
Masu	2025–present

=== Closed ===
Name	Years active
Dukes N Boots	2023–2024
D.B.A.	2011–2024
D.C. Pasta Company	2012–2019
Inferno Nightclub	2017–2025

== Publications ==
- Boccuzzi, Dante (2025) DANTE: Cooking in Harmony, Jason Shaffer (photographer), Charlie Trotter (Forward). Story Farm. ISBN 979-8-9919027-0-0

== Personal life ==
Boccuzzi is father to Francis, Andrea, Julien and Isabella. Boccuzzi lives in Cleveland, Ohio with his wife Simone and her two girls Aurora and Evangeline.
