= The Shoppes at Parma =

Coordinates: 41.382613°N 81.741575°W

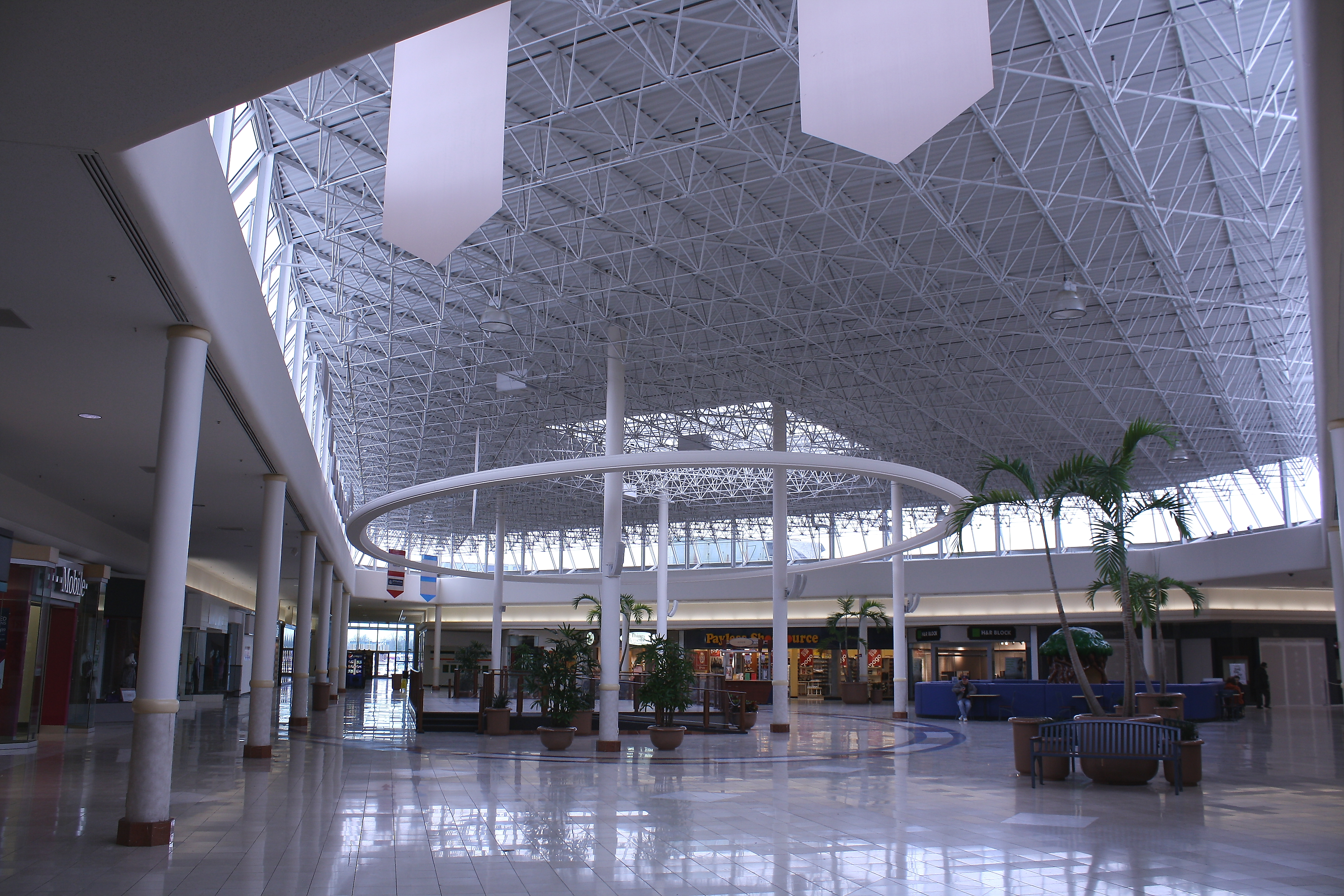
- Location: Parma, Ohio, USA
- Address: 7899 West Ridgewood Drive, Parma, Ohio 44129
- Opened: 1956
- Developer: Forest City Enterprises
- Manager: Hendon Properties, Axiom Realty, and Peaceable Street Capital
- Owner: Hendon Properties, Axiom Realty, and Peaceable Street Capital
- Num. of stores: 50+
- Num. of anchor tenants: 4 (1 vacant) - Marc's, Dick's Sporting Goods, Walmart, Burlington,
- Floor area: 991,600 sq ft (92,120 m^{2})
- Floors: 1 (2 in former JCPenney space)
- Public transit: RTA
- Website: shoppesatparmaoh.com

The Shoppes at Parma, formerly known as Parmatown Mall, is a shopping plaza located in Parma, Ohio, approximately 10 miles (16 km) south of Cleveland. It is located at the southwest corner of Ridge Road and West Ridgewood Drive. It is anchored by Walmart, Burlington, Marc's and Dick's Sporting Goods. The plaza opened as a shopping plaza in 1956 and was enclosed in the mid-1960s and has become an outdoor plaza once again. Its original anchors were Higbee's (1967) and May Company (1960). Higbee's became Dillard's in 1992, and closed in 2000. The old Higbee's structure was demolished and replaced with a new Walmart in 2004. May Company became Kaufmann's in 1993 and Kaufmann's became Macy's in 2006. A Kresge also served as a fourth anchor store until it was closed in the early 1980s to make way for an expansion. Parts of the original plaza remain open-air, with Chuck E. Cheese's and Marc's as major tenants. The mall was renovated in the early 2000s and was renovated to be an outdoor shopping center in 2017, with the interior demolished.

== History ==
From 1967 to 2004, a five-screen cinema operated in the Dillard's wing of the mall. General Cinema opened the Parmatown Theater with two screens, which was unheard of at the time. A third screen opened in the 1970s, along with two more in the 1980s. General Cinema closed the theater in 2001. A year later, a chain known as Cinema Grill leased the theater, renovated the front lobby, and made modifications to allow customers to eat meals while watching movies. When Cinema Grill was evicted due to lack of rent payments, Cleveland Cinemas stepped in and took over. In August 2004, Cleveland Cinemas was asked to leave the mall to allow a Dick's Sporting Goods to be built in its spot. Its last day of operation was August 11, 2004.

=== Decline and closure ===
On July 6, 2011, the Parmatown's lender filed for receivership due to loan service default from RMS Enterprises, a venture formed by the founding Ratner, Miller, and Shafran families of Forest City Enterprises Inc.

On January 4, 2012, Macy's announced the Parmatown store would close in early 2012. The demolition of the store began on January 29, 2014.

On March 26, 2013, Parmatown's new owner, Phillips Edison & Co., announced that the soon-to-be-renovated Parmatown would have a new name: "The Shoppes at Parma". The reconstruction/renovation of the shopping center began during the summer of 2013. In 2014, Dick's Sporting Goods announced that in order for the 2017 mall replacement project to work, they would relocate their Parmatown store to the former Macy's spot. The original space was closed and demolition started in July 2015.

On August 13, 2018, it was announced that Burlington would be filling the space left by the bankrupt Gordman's.

On June 29, 2018, Old Navy announced they would open a store between the A.C. Moore Arts & Crafts, and the JCPenney's Ridgewood Drive entrance.

In early 2020, Ace Hardware opened a store in the former A.C. Moore space.

On June 4, 2020, it was announced that JCPenney would be permanently closing their doors at The Shoppes at Parma becoming the last of the former longstanding anchors of the center to leave. Shoppers World opened in the former JCPenney opened on Friday, November 26, 2021.

On March 5, 2025, Shoppers World closed its Shoppes of Parma location. The fate of the building remains unclear.
