= Parma City School District =

School district in Ohio, United States

Address
- 7377 Chateau Drive Parma, Ohio, 44130; United States

District information
- Type: Public
- Motto: "Your Future Starts Here!"
- Grades: PK–12
- Superintendent: Dr. Scott Hunt
- Asst. superintendent(s): Dr. Amy Cruse
- Schools: 13
- NCES District ID: 3904463

Students and staff
- Students: 9,001 (2024–2025)
- Teachers: 491.37 (on an FTE basis) (2024–2025)
- Staff: 1,602.68 (on an FTE basis) (2024–2025)
- Student–teacher ratio: 18.32 (2024–2025)
- Athletic conference: Cleveland West Conference
- Colors: Green White

Other information
- Website: www.parmacityschools.org

Parma City School District (PCSD) is a school district that serves Parma, Parma Heights, and Seven Hills. The district is in the southwestern section of Cuyahoga County, Ohio. The District's sports stadium is Byers Field. Both high schools play golf at Ridgewood as their home course. The district has 6 Elementary Schools, 3 Middle Schools, 2 High Schools, 1 Alternative School, and 1 Preschool.

== Schools ==
=== High schools (9-12) ===
- Normandy High School
- Valley Forge High School

=== Middle schools (5-8) ===
- Greenbriar Middle School
- Hillside Middle School
- Shiloh Middle School

=== Elementary schools (K-4) ===
- Dentzler Elementary School
- Green Valley Elementary School
- John Muir Elementary School
- Pleasant Valley Elementary School
- Ridge-Brook Elementary School
- Thoreau Park Elementary School

=== Other Schools ===
- Pleasantview First Step Preschool
- Parma Park School (ACES, PAGE, PACTS)

=== Former schools ===
==== Former High School ====
- Parma Senior High School

==== Former Junior High Schools ====
- Fay Junior High School
- Schaaf Junior High School

==== Former Elementary Schools ====
- Arlington Elementary School
- Broadview Elementary School
- Col. John Glenn Elementary School
- Crile Elementary School
- Dag Hammarskjold Elementary School
- Forrest Elementary School (Now Annex of Greenbriar)
- James E. Hanna Elementary School
- Parma Park Elementary School
- Pearl Road Elementary School
- Pleasantview Elementary School (Now home to Preschool)
- Parkview Elementary School
- Renwood Elementary School
- Ridge Road Elementary School
- Royal Ridge Elementary School
- Seven Hills Elementary School
- State Road Elementary School
- Stroud Elementary School

== See also ==
- Winkelman v. Parma City School District
