= Rocky River High School (Ohio) =

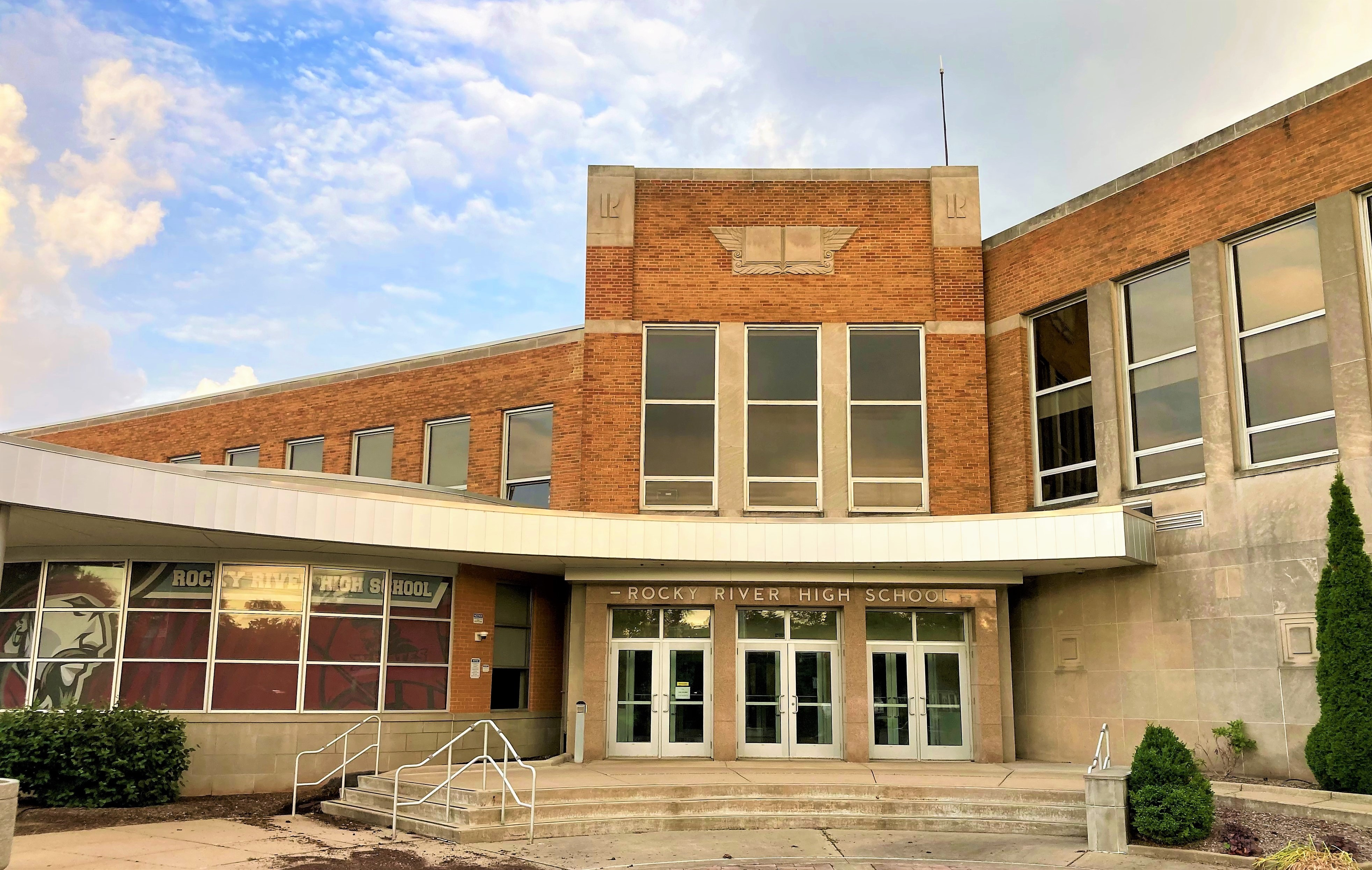

Location
- 20951 Detroit Road; Rocky River, Ohio 44116; United States; 41°28′26″N 81°51′6″W

Information
- Type: Public, Coeducational high school
- Opened: 1919
- School district: Rocky River City School District
- Superintendent: Adham Schirg
- Principal: Steve Sayers
- Teaching staff: 55.67 (on an FTE basis)
- Grades: 9-12
- Enrollment: 825 (2023-2024)
- Student to teacher ratio: 14.82
- Colors: Maroon and White
- Athletics conference: Cleveland West Conference
- Nickname: Pirates
- Rivals: Bay High School (Ohio)
- Accreditation: North Central Association of Colleges and Schools
- Newspaper: The Pirate Press
- Yearbook: The Riverlet
- Website: www.rrcs.org/rockyriverhighschool_home.aspx

Rocky River High School is a public high school in Rocky River, Ohio, suburb of Cleveland, Ohio. Rocky River High School is located on the corner of Wagar & Detroit.

== Demographics ==
The demographic breakdown of the 849 students enrolled for 2016-17 was:

- Male - 47.7%
- Female - 52.3%
- Native American/Alaskan - 0.4%
- Asian - 1.8%
- Black - 1.3%
- Hispanic - 3.3%
- White - 90.9%
- Multiracial - 2.4%

11.1% of the students were eligible for free or reduced-cost lunch.

== Athletics ==
The school colors are maroon and white. The athletic teams are known as the Pirates. Rocky River High School is currently a member of the Cleveland West Conference since 2024. RRHS had been a member of the Great Lakes Conference since the dissolution of the West Shore Conference in 2015.

Ohio High School Athletic Association State Championships

- Boys lacrosse - 2026
- Boys track and field - 1923, 1924, 1927
- Girls soccer - 2013

== Notable alumni ==
- Nina Blackwood (Class of 1970), former MTV VJ and current SiriusXM Satellite Radio host on the 80s on 8 channel
- Carter Camper (Class of 2007), NHL ice hockey player
- Nev Chandler (Class of 1964), media personality and former radio voice of the Cleveland Browns
- Michael Chernus (Class of 1995), actor in multiple movies and TV shows
- Arthur D. Collins, Jr. (Class of 1965), Chairman & CEO, Medtronic, Inc. Medtronic, Inc.
- Forrest Faison (Class of 1976), U.S. Navy Surgeon General
- "Swingin'" Sammy Kaye, Big Band leader
- Jann Klose, pop singer songwriter, as an exchange student from Germany
- Pat McCormick (Class of 1945), actor in Smokey and the Bandit and its two sequels - writer for The Jack Paar Show, Get Smart, The Danny Kaye Show
- Martin Savidge (Class of 1976), former CNN reporter and current NBC News reporter
- Michael Stanley (Class of 1966), of the Michael Stanley Band
