= Parma Senior High School =

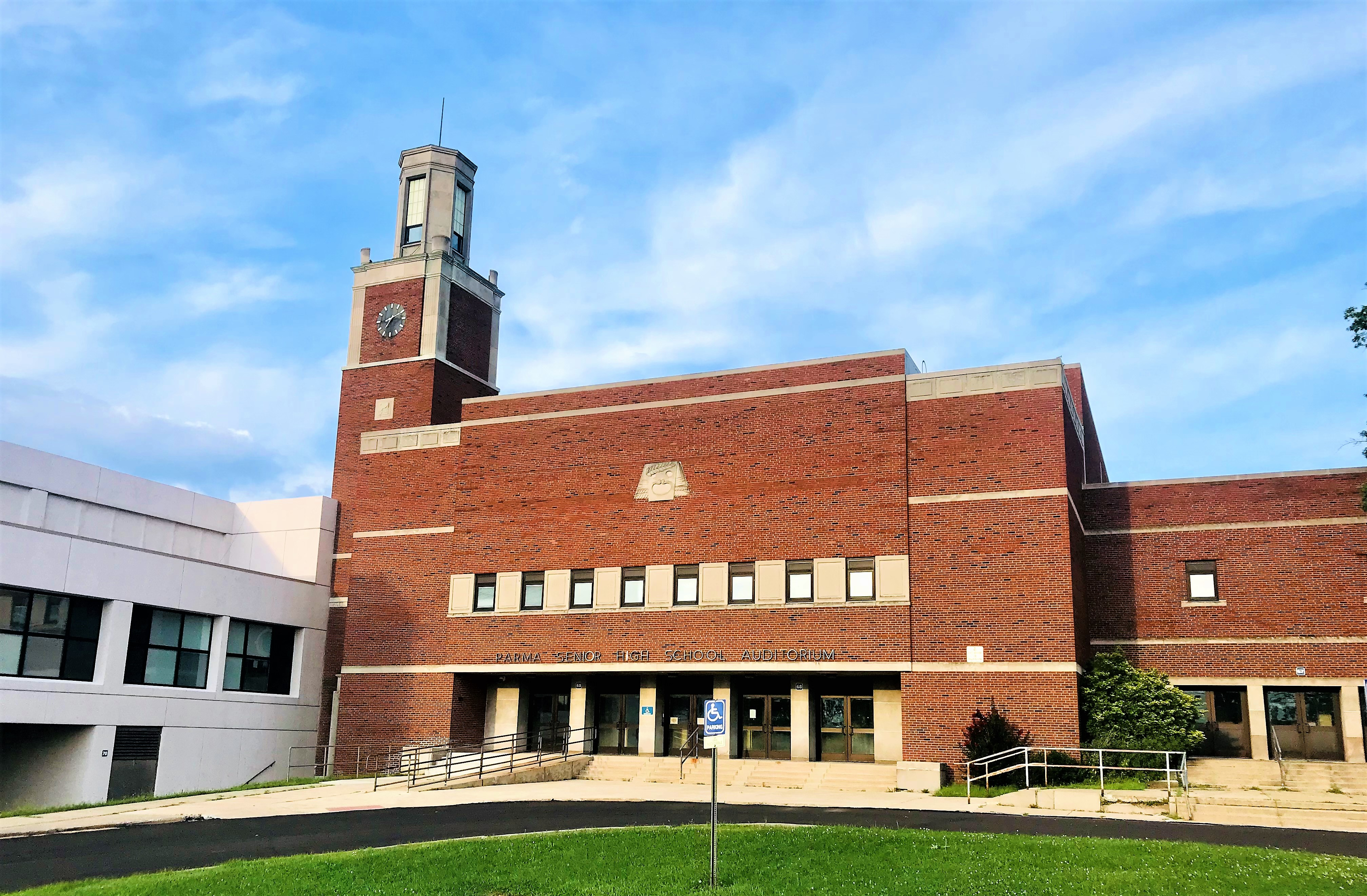
- Parma Senior High School at its former location prior to demolition in 2024

Location
- 6285 West 54th Street; Parma, (Cuyahoga County), Ohio 44129; United States; 41°23′34″N 81°43′16″W

Information
- Type: Public, Coeducational high school
- Established: 1953
- Status: Demolished
- Closed: 2023
- School district: Parma City School District
- Grades: 9-12
- Campus: Suburban
- Colors: Red and Gray
- Team name: Redmen

Parma Senior High School (also referred to as PSH or Parma High School) was a public high school located in Parma, Ohio. was one of three public high schools in the Parma City School District. Their Athletic teams were known as the Redmen.

== History ==
Opened in 1953, Parma Senior High School served students grades 9-12. It was formerly known as Parma Schaaf High School.

Parma Senior High School closed following the 2022-23 school year, following a consolidation plan of the Parma City School District. The former high school was later demolished in 2024.

== Notable alumni ==
- John Adams, Cleveland Guardians superfan
- Carmen Cozza, former college football coach
- Neil Giraldo, musician
- Frank A. Herda, former United States soldier, Medal of Honor recipient
- Les Horvath, former professional football player in the National Football League (NFL)
- Scott Jarvis, former actor
- Ron Labinski, former architect
- Biagio Messina, filmmaker, TV producer, and actor
- Mike Ozdowski, former professional football player in the National Football League (NFL)
- Rich Rollins, former professional baseball player in the Major League Baseball (MLB)
- Alan Ruck, actor
