= Marc's =

Discount drugstore and grocery chain in Ohio, United States

Marc Glassman Inc.

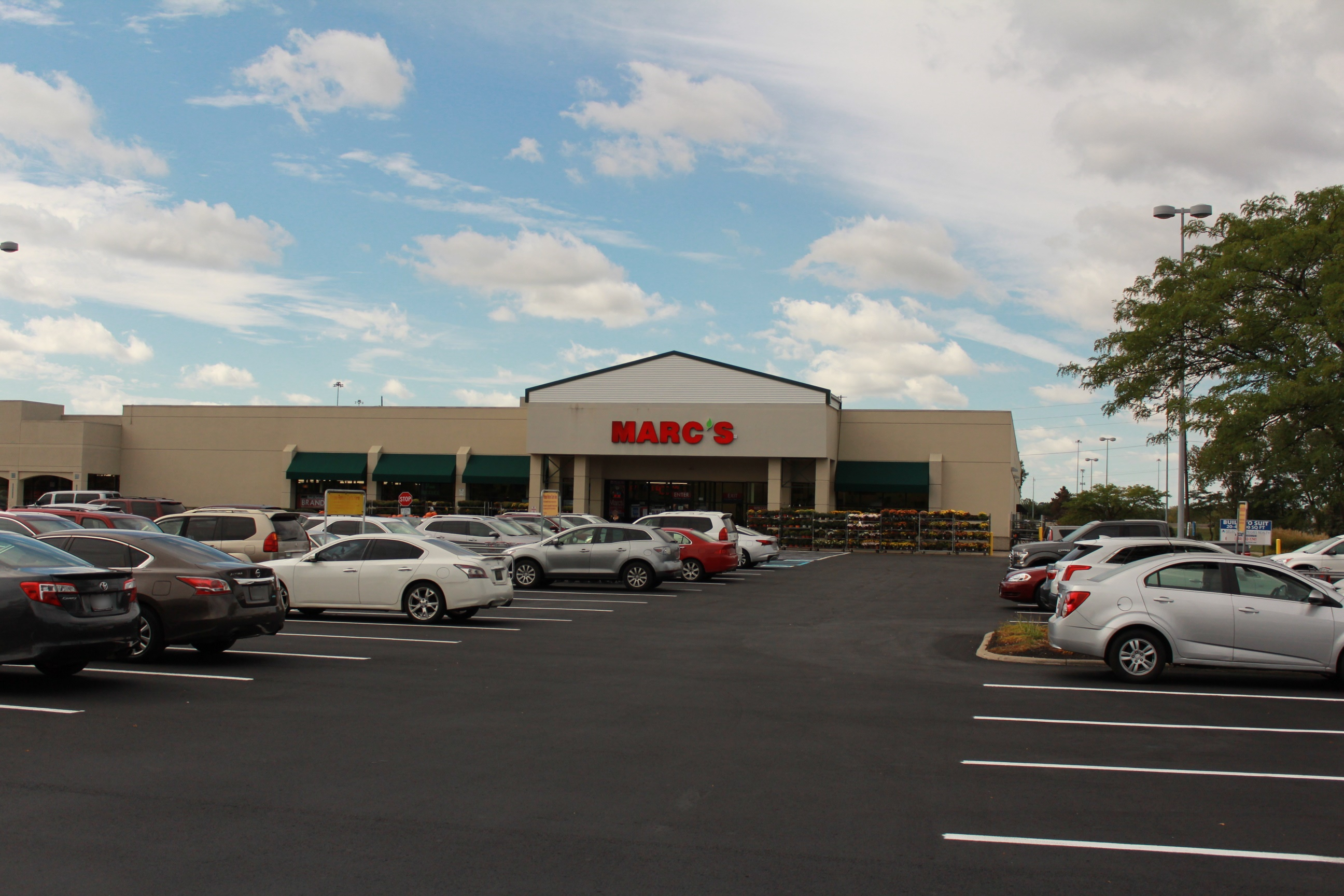
- A Marc's in Westerville, Ohio, as shown in 2019.
- Trade name: Marc's Stores
- Type: Private
- Industry: Retail
- Founded: 1979; 47 years ago in Middleburg Heights, Ohio, U.S.
- Founder: Marc Glassman
- Headquarters: Parma, Ohio, United States
- Number of locations: 61
- Area served: Ohio
- Key people: Marc Glassman (Chairman And Chief Executive Officer)
- Products: Bakery, dairy, deli meats, frozen foods, general grocery, meat, produce, snacks, health and beauty products, pet supplies, housewares, books, children's toys, home decor, clothing
- Services: Discount retail; drugstore; grocery
- Revenue: ▲US$1.03 billion (2021)
- Owner: Marc Glassman
- Number of employees: 3,000 (Jan. 2021)
- Website: www.marcs.com

Marc's Stores is a discount drugstore-and-grocery chain, with stores in northern and central Ohio. It is owned by Clevelander Marc Glassman. Marc's has over 60 stores in the Cleveland, Akron, Canton, Youngstown, and Columbus areas.

== History ==
Bernie Shulman opened his first mega-discount drug store in Mayfield Heights, Ohio in 1969. In 1979 one of Shulman's managers, Marc Glassman, opened his own store, Marc's, in Middleburg Heights in the Southland Shopping Center in Middleburg Heights. That first store was badly damaged in a fire in October 1980 that started in, and destroyed, the adjacent J.C. Penney department store. Marc's closed for several months, eventually reopening in a larger space at the same site.

Following the success of the Middleburg Heights store, Glassman built additional Marc's stores. In 1983, he purchased Shulman's store. Glassman continued to build stores in Greater Cleveland. Glassman's western stores were named Marc's, while those to the east were named Bernie Shulman's, to honor Shulman, who died in 1976, and because of brand recognition.

As the Marc's stores expanded east to Solon and south to Akron, the recognition of the Marc's name grew. Glassman decided to retire the Bernie Shulman's name for new stores, using the Marc's name for grand openings, including stores east of Cleveland. The first of the Marc's "superstores" opened in Garfield Heights on June 30, 1992. By year's end, all Bernie Shulman's stores were rebranded.

On August 8, 2018, a Marc's store opened in Kettering, a suburb of Dayton in southwestern Ohio, in a former Kroger site. This store is scheduled to close on February 5, 2023, due to the ending of its lease.

In March 2020, Glassman opened a 54,000-square-foot store at 3112 Cleveland Ave. NW in Canton to replace the store that had been in the 30th Street Plaza since the late 1980s.

In September 2026, Marc's announced it would outsource operations of its Parma produce and commissary facility to Indianapolis Fruit, which will then be responsible for supplying all Marc's locations.

== Media ==
The company is rarely discussed in the media. Employees are prohibited from giving interviews, and Glassman does not speak to reporters.
