= Normandy High School (Ohio) =

Public, coeducational high school in Parma, Ohio, United States

Normandy High School (commonly Normandy or NHS) is a public high school in Parma, Ohio, United States, serving students in grades 9–12. The school is part of the Parma City School District, with admission primarily based on students' home locations. Established in 1968, Normandy is located approximately three miles west of Interstate 77 on West Pleasant Valley Road. As of the 2005-06 year, the school had an enrollment of 1,283 students and 77.9 classroom teachers (on an FTE basis), for a student-teacher ratio of 16.5.

== School information ==
Normandy primarily offers a college preparatory curriculum. There are accelerated course offerings in all the academic areas. In addition to a full range of academic courses, many vocational education programs are available to students at Normandy or at Parma City School District's other high school, Valley Forge. Twenty-one credits minimum used to be required for graduation. However, since the failure of the levy, it has been reduced to 20. Math, social studies, computer literacy and science courses remain integral to this requirement. The school colors are orange and white. The school is a member of the Cleveland West Conference. Normandy's corresponding middle school is Hillside, home of the Tigers whose colors are blue and white.

== Notable alumni ==
- Christopher A. Boyko – class of 1972, United States District Judge
- John Choma – class of 1973, former NFL player, played in Super Bowl XVI
- Victor Boschini – class of 1974, Chancellor of Texas Christian University
- Michael Bierut – class of 1975, graphic designer
- Stephen "Suede" Baum – class of 1989, fashion designer notable for his appearance in season 5 of Project Runway
- Mike "The Miz" Mizanin – class of 1999, professional wrestler and former WWE Champion

== Sports ==
Normandy High School athletic teams competed in the Northeast Ohio Conference from its inaugural season of 2007 until its dissolution in 2015. Normandy joined the newly-formed Great Lakes Conference and began play beginning with the 2015-16 academic year. Normandy then helped form the Cleveland West Conference in 2024.

Normandy High School
- The Dome

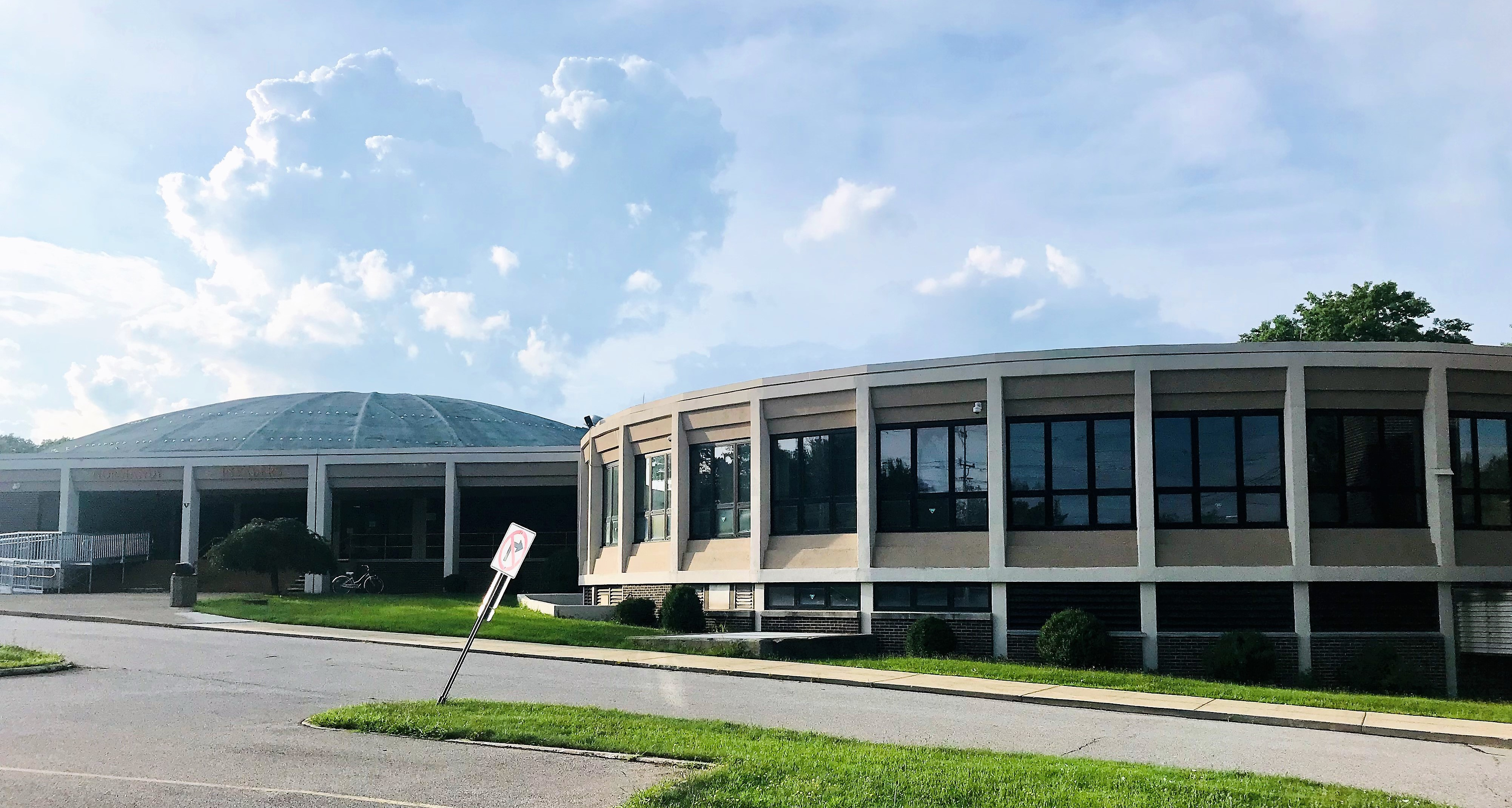

Location
- 2500 West Pleasant Valley Road; 2500 W Pleasant Valley Rd, Parma, Ohio 44134; Parma, (Cuyahoga County), Ohio 44134; United States; 41°21′44″N 81°41′57″W

Information
- Type: Public, coeducational high school
- Motto: There's No Place Like Dome
- Established: 1968
- School district: Parma City School District
- Superintendent: Scott J. Hunt
- Principal: Rachel Urban
- Staff: 219
- Grades: 9-12
- Enrollment: 1,643 (2023–2024)
- Average class size: 20
- Colors: Orange, White, Black
- Slogan: "Home of the Invaders"
- Song: "Normandy, Thy Light Will Guide Us"
- Athletics conference: Cleveland West Conference
- Mascot: Invader Man
- Team name: Invaders
- Rival: Valley Forge High School
- National ranking: 5,069
- Newspaper: The Vanguard
- Yearbook: "The Bayeux", Marc Kirby, Advisor
- Communities served: Parma, Ohio, Seven Hills, Ohio
- Student Council Advisors: Carrie McCarthy
- Website: https://normandy.parmacityschools.org/

Sports offered in the fall include dazzlers, cross country, cheerleading, American football, golf, soccer, girls' tennis and volleyball.

In the winter, sports include boys' and girls' basketball, hockey, boys' and girls' swimming and wrestling, boys' and girls' cheerleading.

Spring sports include baseball, boys' tennis, softball and track and field athletics.

== Activities ==
- Academic Challenge^{*}
- Art Club
- Athletic Trainers
- Audio Visual
- Bowling
- Cheerleaders
- Choir
- Computer Club
- Conflict Mediators
- Dazzlers
- Drama
- Environmental Club
- French Club
- GSA (Gay-Straight Alliance)
- Hope Squad
- Jazz Band
- Junior Advisory Board^{*}
- Key Club
- Marching Band
- National Honor Society
- Newspaper (The Vanguard)^{*}
- Office Pagers
- Orchestra
- Photography Club
- Pop Ensemble
- Polka Band
- Renaissance
- SADD
- Senior Advisory Board
- Ski/Snowboard Club
- Spanish Club
- Student Ambassadors
- Student Government^{*}
- The Yearbook

^{*}Currently unavailable due to budget cuts in the district.
