= Valley Forge High School =

Public, coeducational high school in Parma Heights, Ohio, US

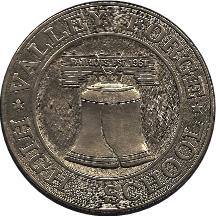
- Official Valley Forge Seal

Location
- 9999 Independence Boulevard; Parma Heights, (Cuyahoga County), Ohio 44130; United States; 41°22′19″N 81°45′21″W

Information
- Type: Public, Coeducational high school
- Established: 1961
- School district: Parma City School District
- Superintendent: Scott J. Hunt
- Principal: Mandy McCullough
- Staff: 233
- Teaching staff: 79.83 (FTE)
- Grades: 9-12
- Student to teacher ratio: 18.19
- Campus type: Closed
- Colors: Navy Blue, White
- Athletics: Yes
- Athletics conference: Cleveland West Conference
- Nickname: Patriots
- Team name: Patriots
- Rivals: Normandy High School
- National ranking: 7,246
- Newspaper: The Battlecry
- Communities served: Parma Heights, Ohio, Parma, Ohio
- Website: Valley Forge High School
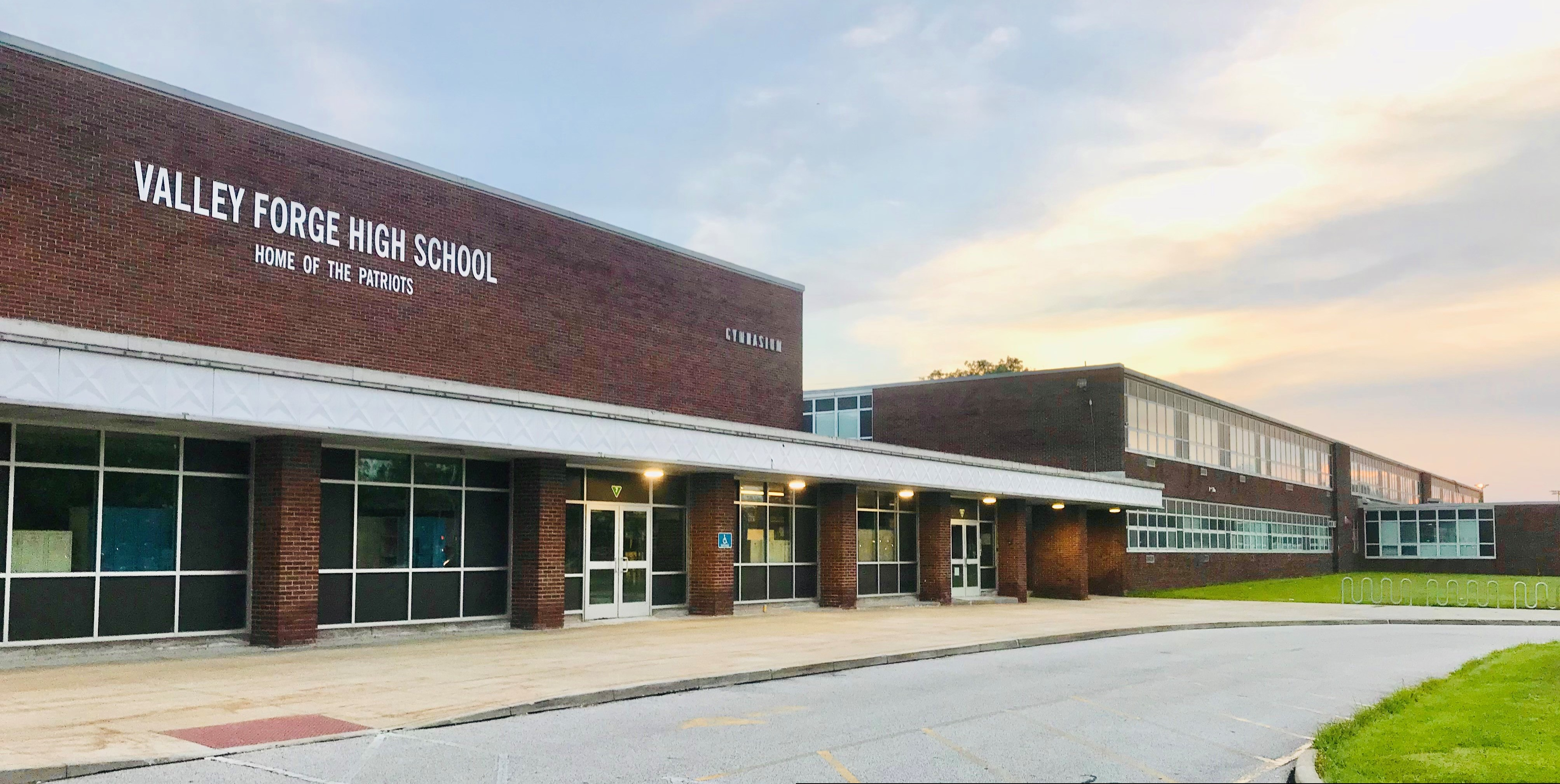

Valley Forge High School is located in Parma Heights, Ohio, a suburb of Cleveland. It is one of two high schools in the Parma City School District, which is one of the largest school districts in the state of Ohio, serving the cities of Parma, Parma Heights, and Seven Hills. The school's colors are navy blue and white; its sports teams are known as the Patriots.

== History ==
On March 1, 2008, Barack Obama visited the school for his 2008 presidential primary campaign. He spoke to an audience of about 1,300 people and responded to questions following his speech.

On April 20, 2026, Valley Forge High School was evacuated following a shooting incident. Parma police sergeant Scott Traxler confirmed that an 18-year-old female student, Marissa R. Rand, took her own life at approximately 2:10 P.M. in the school cafeteria. She was transported to a hospital where she was pronounced dead. The weapon used in the incident was a black semi-automatic handgun taken from a family member. Parma Heights Police Chief Steven Greene noted that the shooting likely had ties to the 27th anniversary of the Columbine High School massacre, which has since been confirmed. Hours before the suicide, she posted images of a shrine and a locket containing the pictures of Eric Harris and Dylan Klebold. Both Normandy High School and Valley Forge canceled classes for the following three days. A vigil took take place on the following Saturday at the school for the student. After this incident, a school board member, Leah Euerle, at the Parma City School District resigned, due to death threats, and many call for the board's president to do the same.

== Extracurriculars ==
In the 2005 Marching Season, Valley Forge Patriot Marching Band became the first band in the Parma City School District to earn the right to attend and perform at the OMEA Marching Band State Finals in Columbus, Ohio. The band performed as a Class AA band. The band was later presented with a commendation for this achievement by the Board of Education for Parma and Parma Heights.

== Athletics ==
=== State championships ===
- Boy's wrestling - 1972

== Notable alumni ==
- James Dalessandro - writer and filmmaker
- Andrew Gissinger - former San Diego Chargers offensive lineman
- Jim Kovach - former National Football League linebacker of New Orleans Saints and San Francisco 49ers.
- Jamie Meder - former Cleveland Browns defensive lineman
- Barb Mucha - professional golfer and former LPGA Tour member
- Benjamin Orr - co-founder of rock band The Cars
- Stan Parrish - former football head coach for Kansas State, Ball State and Marshall University, offensive coordinator for University of Michigan
- Muhamed Sacirbey - ex-UN ambassador for Bosnia
- Christopher Smith - actor, director, and improviser best known for his appearances on Whose Line Is It Anyway?
- Kath Soucie - voice actress

== OHSAA State Championships ==
- Wrestling - 1972
