= Parma, Ohio =

- City
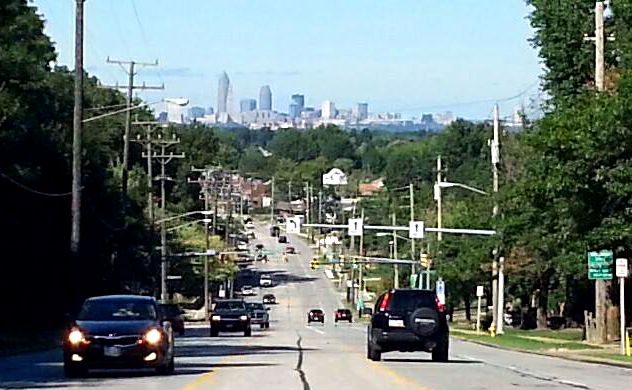
- Cleveland's skyline from State Road

- Flag Seal
- Nickname: The Garden City
- Motto: "Progress Through Partnerships"
- Interactive map of Parma, Ohio
- Location within Ohio Location within the United States
- Coordinates: 41.383569°N 81.728641°W
- Country: United States
- State: Ohio
- County: Cuyahoga
- Founded: 1816
- Township: March 7, 1826
- Incorporated (village): December 15, 1924
- Incorporated (city): January 1, 1931
- Named for: Parma, Italy; Parma translated refers to a round shield, such as the one used by Roman legionaries

Government
  - Type: Mayor–Council
  - Mayor: Timothy J. DeGeeter (D)
  - President: Vito Dipierro; Deborah Lime
  - City Clerk: Kristin Saban
  - Majority leader: Kammy Coyle Shuman
  - Councilmembers: Monica Wilson; John Soeder; Kelly Zacharias; Allan Divis; Kevin Kussmaul; Amanda Boyd; Rob Euerle

Area
  - City: 20.070 sq mi (51.981 km^{2})
  - Land: 20.023 sq mi (51.859 km^{2})
  - Water: 0.047 sq mi (0.121 km^{2}) 0.23%
- Elevation: 945 ft (288 m)

Population (2020)
  - City: 81,146
  - Estimate (2025): 78,581
  - Rank: US: 470th OH: 7th
  - Density: 4,052.7/sq mi (1,564.7/km^{2})
  - Urban: 1,712,178 (US: 31st)
  - Urban density: 2,399/sq mi (926.1/km^{2})
  - Metro: 2,171,877 (US: 34th)
  - Combined: 3,750,887 (US: 18th)
- Demonym(s): Parmesan, Parmanian
- Time zone: UTC–5 (Eastern (EST))
  - Summer (DST): UTC–4 (EDT)
- ZIP Codes: 44129, 44130, 44131, 44134
- Area codes: 440/436 and 216
- FIPS code: 39-61000
- GNIS feature ID: 1085991
- Website: cityofparma-oh.gov

Parma is a city in Cuyahoga County, Ohio, United States. It is a suburb south of Cleveland. The population was 81,146 at the 2020 census, and was estimated at 78,581 in 2025, making it the seventh-most populous city in Ohio, the largest suburb in the state, and the second-largest city in Cuyahoga County. Parma is part of the Greater Cleveland MSA, a region containing an estimated 2,165,775 residents in the 2024 estimate. Parma is located approximately 8 miles (13 km) south of Cleveland.

== History ==
=== Greenbriar (1806–1826) ===
In 1806, the area that would eventually become Parma and Parma Heights was originally surveyed by Abraham Tappan, a surveyor for the Connecticut Land Company, and was known as Township 6 - Range 13. This designation gave the town its first identity in the Western Reserve. Soon after, Township 6 - Range 13 was commonly referred to as "Greenbriar", supposedly for the rambling bush that grew there. Benajah Fay, his wife Ruth Wilcox Fay, and their ten children, arrivals from Lewis County, New York, were the first settlers in 1816. It was then that Greenbriar, under a newly organized government seat under Brooklyn Township, began attending to its own governmental needs.

=== Parma Township (1826–1924) ===
Self-government started to gain in popularity by the time the new Greenbriar settlement contained twenty householders. However, prior to the establishment of the new township, the name Greenbriar was replaced by the name Parma. This was largely due to Dr. David Long who had recently returned from Italy and "impressed with the grandeur and beauty...was reminded of Parma, Italy and...persuaded the early townspeople that the territory deserved a better name than Greenbriar."

Thus, on March 7, 1826, a resolution was passed ordering the construction of the new township. It stated,

On the petition of sundry inhabitants for a new township to be organized and erected comprising No. 6 in the 13th Range. Ordered that said Township No. 6 in the 13th Range be set off and erected into a new Township by the name of Parma, to be bounded by the original lines of said Township.

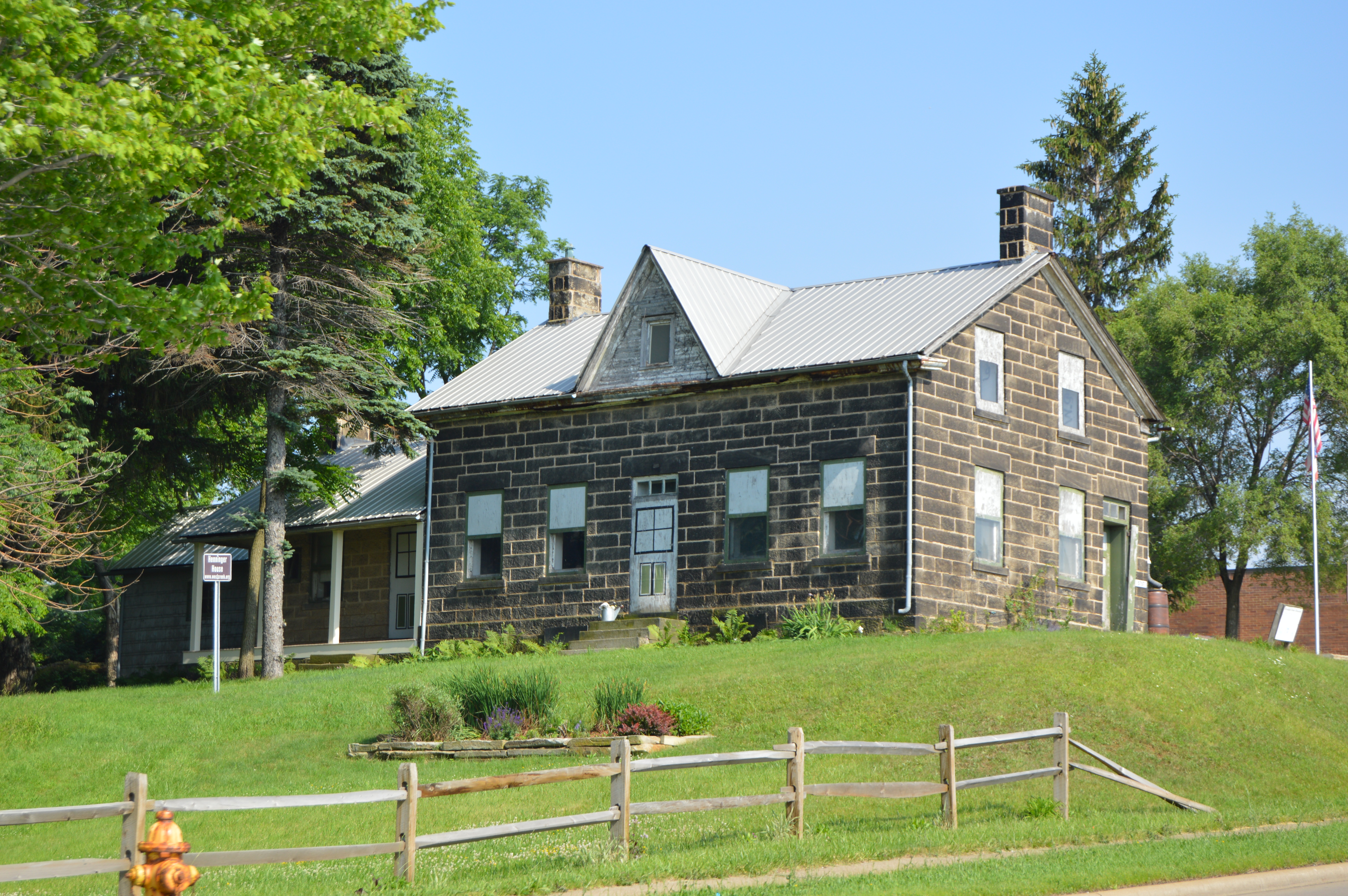
Phillip Henninger House, built in 1842, is listed on the National Register of Historic Places.

On the same day, a public notice was issued to qualified electors by the County Commissioners. They met at the Samuel Freeman House on April 3, 1826, to elect township officers according to the law. It was then that the first eleven officers were elected to lead the new government.

During this time, Parma Township remained largely agricultural. The first schoolhouse was a log structure built on the hill at the northern corner of what is now Parma Heights Cemetery. A memorial plate on a stone marks the spot. In 1827, the township was divided into road districts. The Broadview Road of today was then known as Town Line Road as well as Independence Road. Ridge Road was known then as Center Road as it cut through the center of town. York Road was then known as York Street as arrivals from the state of New York settled there. Pearl Road then had many names which included Medina Wooster Pike, Wooster Pike, the Cleveland Columbus Road, and the Brighton and Parma Plank Road.

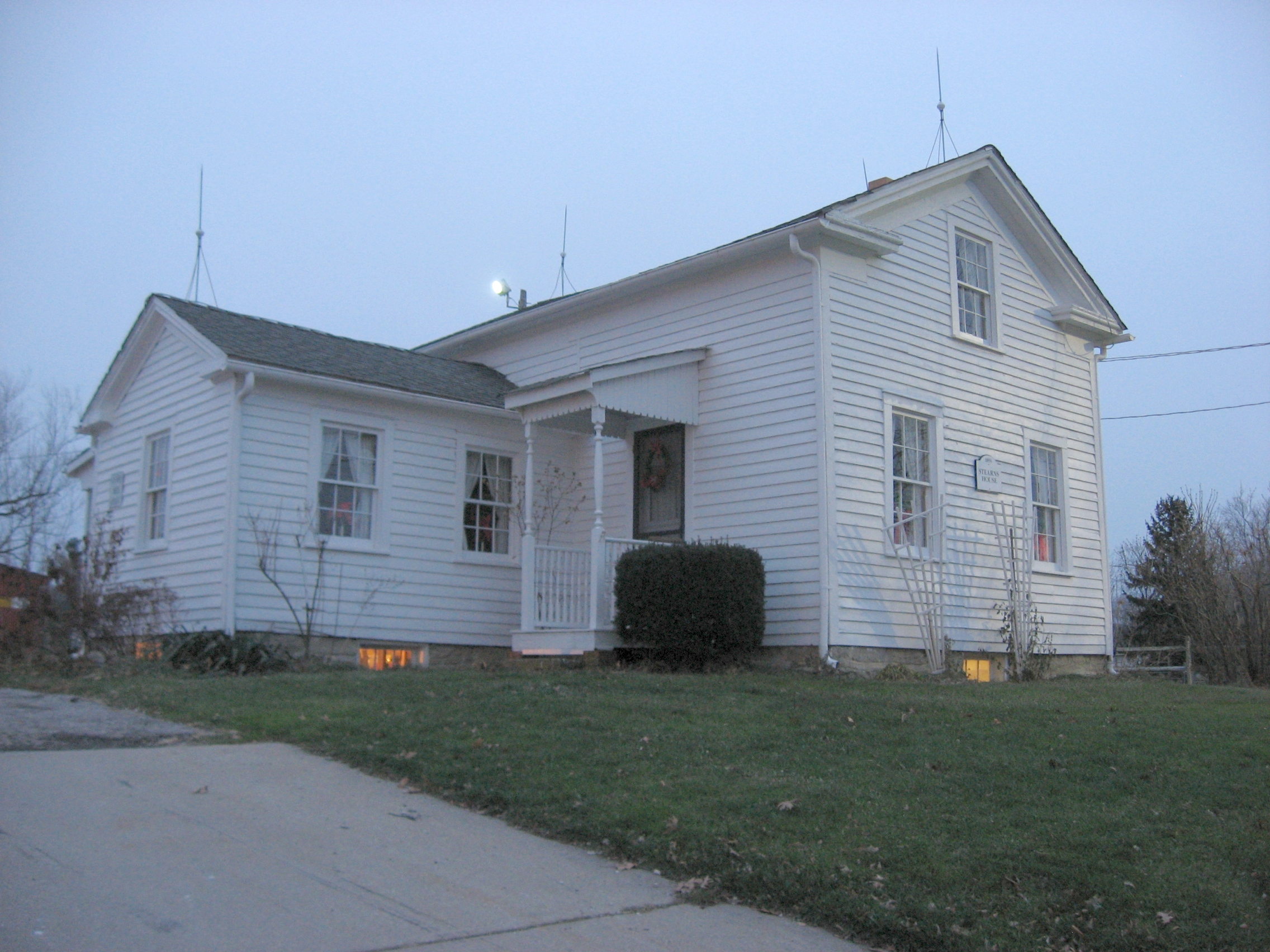
Lyman Stearns Farm house, built 1855

A stone house, built in 1849 and known as the Henninger House, was occupied by several generations of Henningers and is still standing today. The house rests on one of the higher points in Cuyahoga County, which provided visibility for the entire northeastern part of Parma Township. This was also the same site where the Erie Indians, centuries before, stood to read and send fire signals as well as pray to their spirits.

By 1850, the US census listed Parma Township's population at 1,329. However, the rising population of the township had slowed over the decades. The Civil War affected Parma much as it did other towns and villages in the nation. Three out of four homes sent a father, sons, or sometimes both, to fight in the war. By 1910, the population of the township had increased to 1,631.

In 1911, Parma Heights, due to the temperance mood of the day, separated itself from the Parma Township after by a vote of 42 to 32 and was incorporated as a village comprising 4.13 square miles.

"A main reason for establishing the village of Parma Heights was to get a town marshal...There is one saloon in the territory...some pretty rough crowds Sundays have disturbed the quiet of the neighborhood...wanted it closed on Sundays. To do this they wished a town marshal. They couldn't have a town marshal without becoming a village, so they became one."

=== The Village of Parma (1924–1930) ===
By 1920, the US census showed Parma Township had a population of just 2,345, but the following decade proved to be a time of significant growth and development for Parma. It was in the 1920s that Parma Township transformed from a farming community into a village. On December 15, 1924, Parma was incorporated as a village.

The largest and fastest growing development of that time was H. A. Stahl's Ridgewood Gardens development, which started in 1919, continued through the 1920s, and into the 1930s. A resident of Shaker Heights, Ohio's first Garden City, H. A. Stahl developed Ridgewood as an ambitious "model village" project patterned along the lines of and rivaling the earlier Shaker Heights project with "churches, schools, motion picture theater, community house, and other features forming a part of all well-developed residence communities". Ridgewood was designed and marketed as a Garden City on 1,000 acres of land to accommodate about 40,000 residents "325 feet above Lake Erie, in the healthiest section of the South Side, free from the smoke of industries, or the congestion and noises of sections nearer the Public Square."

=== The City of Parma (1931–present) ===
On January 1, 1931, Parma became a city with a population of 13,899. Whereas the incorporation of the village of Parma was met with much optimism, the newly established city of Parma faced the uncertainty of the Great Depression which had almost entirely stopped its growth. Money was scarce, tax income was limited, and some began to talk of annexation of both the city and school district to Cleveland. Both annexation issues, however, were soundly defeated as Parma voters overwhelmingly voted against them and silenced proponents of annexation. Not long after this, Parma was once again solvent due in large part to the newly created Gallagher Act, a 1936 Ohio law that aided cities threatened with bankruptcy and the determination of Parma's Auditor, Sam Nowlin. By 1941, a building boom appeared to be underway in Parma just as the United States was about to enter World War II.

After World War II, Parma once again began to experience tremendous growth as young families began moving from Cleveland into the suburbs. Between 1950 and 1960, Parma's population soared from 28,897 to 82,845. By 1956, Parma was unchallenged as the fastest growing city in the United States. The population peaked in 1970 at 100,216.

In 2016, Parma's population had declined to 81,601, though it remains one of the Cleveland area's top three destinations young adults (aged 22 to 34) are increasingly choosing as a place to live, along with Lakewood and downtown Cleveland and in 2016 was recognized by Businessweek as one of the best places to raise kids in Ohio.

== Geography ==
Parma is southwest of Cleveland; it is bounded by Cleveland and Brooklyn on the north, Brooklyn Heights, and Seven Hills on the east, North Royalton and Broadview Heights on the south, and Brook Park, Middleburg Heights, and Parma Heights on the west.

According to the United States Census Bureau, the city has a total area of 20.070 square miles (51.98 km^{2}), of which 20.023 square miles (51.86 km^{2}) is land and 0.047 square miles (0.12 km^{2}) (0.23%) is water.

Two major changes and developments have recently occurred regarding two principal sites within the city:

1. The West Creek Preservation Agency has worked to preserve various historic and natural sites in the city, including the Henninger House and the West Creek Watershed.
2. Henninger House, built in 1849 and the oldest standing home in Parma, is planned to be part of the proposed Quarry Creek Historic District.

=== Surrounding communities ===
Parma is bounded by Cleveland and Brooklyn on the north, Brooklyn Heights, and Seven Hills on the east, North Royalton and Broadview Heights on the south, and Brook Park, Middleburg Heights, and Parma Heights on the west.

== Demographics ==
Historical population
Census	Pop.	Note	%±
1930	13,899		—
1940	16,365		17.7%
1950	28,897		76.6%
1960	82,845		186.7%
1970	100,216		21.0%
1980	92,548		−7.7%
1990	87,876		−5.0%
2000	85,655		−2.5%
2010	81,601		−4.7%
2020	81,146		−0.6%
2025 (est.)	78,581		−3.2%
U.S. Decennial Census; 2020 Census

In 2013, Parma formed a sister-city relationship with Lviv, Ukraine and is home to Ohio's largest Ukrainian community, the majority of whom are foreign born, with more than twice the number of any other city.

Parma is the seat of the Ukrainian Catholic Eparchy of Saint Josaphat in Parma, which was established by Pope John Paul II in 1983.

According to realtor website Zillow, the average price of a home as of November 30, 2025, in Parma is $206,811.

As of the 2024 American Community Survey, the city has a median household income of $73,861. Approximately 7.4% of the city's population lives at or below the poverty line. Parma has an estimated 65.9% employment rate, with 25.1% of the population holding a bachelor's degree or higher and 91.6% holding a high school diploma.

The top five reported languages (people were allowed to report up to two languages, thus the figures will generally add to more than 100%) were English (80.2%), Spanish (3.2%), Indo-European (14.6%), Asian and Pacific Islander (0.3%), and Other (1.6%).

=== Racial and ethnic composition ===
Parma, Ohio – racial and ethnic composition Note: the US Census treats Hispanic/Latino as an ethnic category. This table excludes Latinos from the racial categories and assigns them to a separate category. Hispanics/Latinos may be of any race.
Race / ethnicity (NH = non-Hispanic)	Pop. 1990	Pop. 2000	Pop. 2010	Pop. 2020	% 1990	% 2000	% 2010	% 2020
White alone (NH)	85,432	81,102	74,186	66,785	97.22%	94.68%	90.91%	82.30%
Black or African American alone (NH)	630	901	1,797	3,271	0.72%	1.05%	2.20%	4.03%
Native American or Alaska Native alone (NH)	85	110	121	140	0.10%	0.13%	0.15%	0.17%
Asian alone (NH)	940	1,346	1,497	2,027	1.07%	1.57%	1.83%	2.50%
Pacific Islander alone (NH)	—	13	11	8	—	0.02%	0.01%	0.01%
Other race alone (NH)	21	50	54	257	0.02%	0.06%	0.07%	0.32%
Mixed race or multiracial (NH)	—	810	1,020	3,094	—	0.95%	1.25%	3.81%
Hispanic or Latino (any race)	768	1,323	2,915	5,564	0.87%	1.54%	3.57%	6.86%
Total	87,876	85,655	81,601	81,146	100.00%	100.00%	100.00%	100.00%

=== 2020 census ===
As of the 2020 census, Parma had a population of 81,146; the median age was 42.3 years, 18.3% of residents were under the age of 18, and 19.6% of residents were 65 years of age or older. For every 100 females there were 95.2 males, and for every 100 females age 18 and over there were 92.9 males age 18 and over.

As of the 2020 census, there were 35,124 households in Parma, of which 23.2% had children under the age of 18 living in them. Of all households, 41.0% were married-couple households, 21.2% were households with a male householder and no spouse or partner present, and 29.9% were households with a female householder and no spouse or partner present. About 33.2% of all households were made up of individuals and 13.9% had someone living alone who was 65 years of age or older.

As of the 2020 census, there were 36,917 housing units, of which 4.9% were vacant. The homeowner vacancy rate was 1.1% and the rental vacancy rate was 5.4%.

As of the 2020 census, 100.0% of residents lived in urban areas, while 0.0% lived in rural areas.

The most reported detailed ancestries were:

- German (21.2%)
- Irish (16.7%)
- Polish (12.8%)
- Italian (11.7%)
- English (10.1%)
- Slovak (4.8%)
- Ukrainian (4.5%)
- Puerto Rican (4.3%)
- Hungarian (4.2%)
- African American (3.3%)

Racial composition as of the 2020 census
Race	Number	Percent
White	68,288	84.2%
Black or African American	3,459	4.3%
American Indian and Alaska Native	190	0.2%
Asian	2,041	2.5%
Native Hawaiian and Other Pacific Islander	18	0.0%
Some other race	1,995	2.5%
Two or more races	5,155	6.4%
Hispanic or Latino (of any race)	5,564	6.9%

=== 2010 census ===
As of the 2010 census, there were 81,601 people, 34,489 households, and 21,646 families residing in the city. The population density was 4,075.36 inhabitants per square mile (1,573.5/km^{2}). There were 36,608 housing units at an average density of 1,828.30 per square mile (705.9/km^{2}). The racial makeup of the city was 93.04% White, 2.31% African American, 0.19% Native American, 1.85% Asian, 0.02% Pacific Islander, 1.02% from some other races and 1.57% from two or more races. Hispanic or Latino people of any race were 3.57% of the population.

There were 34,489 households, of which 27.1% had children under the age of 18 living with them, 45.7% were married couples living together, 12.4% had a female householder with no husband present, 4.6% had a male householder with no wife present, and 37.2% were non-families. 31.8% of all households were made up of individuals, and 12.9% had someone living alone who was 65 years of age or older. The average household size was 2.34 and the average family size was 2.95.

The median age in the city was 41.5 years. 20.4% of residents were under the age of 18; 8.5% were between the ages of 18 and 24; 25.7% were from 25 to 44; 27.7% were from 45 to 64; and 17.7% were 65 years of age or older. The gender makeup of the city was 48.1% male and 51.9% female.

The most reported detailed ancestries were:

- German (22.5%)
- Polish (17.6%)
- Italian (14.8%)
- Irish (13.8%)
- Slovak (7.4%)
- English (6.7%)
- Ukrainian (5.3%)
- French (2.6%)
- Serbian (2.2%)
- Czech (1.9%)
- Arab (1.4%)
- Croatian (1.2%)
- Lithuanian (1.2%)
- Russian (1.2%)

=== 2000 census ===
In 2000, the most reported detailed languages spoken were:

- English (87.04%)
- Ukrainian (2.26%)
- Polish (1.69%)
- Spanish (1.27%)
- German (1.24%)
- Italian (1.18%)

=== Income ===
The median income for a household in the city was $50,198, the median income for a family was $60,696 and the mean income for a family was $68,828. The per capita income for the city was $25,064. The poverty rate in the city was 10.2%. This was low in comparison to other large Ohio cities as well as the state's individual poverty rate of 15.4%.

=== Safety ===
In 2014, Parma ranked as the third safest city in the United States with a population of 25,000 or more by Neighborhood Scout. In 2014, Parma had a crime index of 90 meaning it was safer than 90% of cities in the United States.

== Economy ==
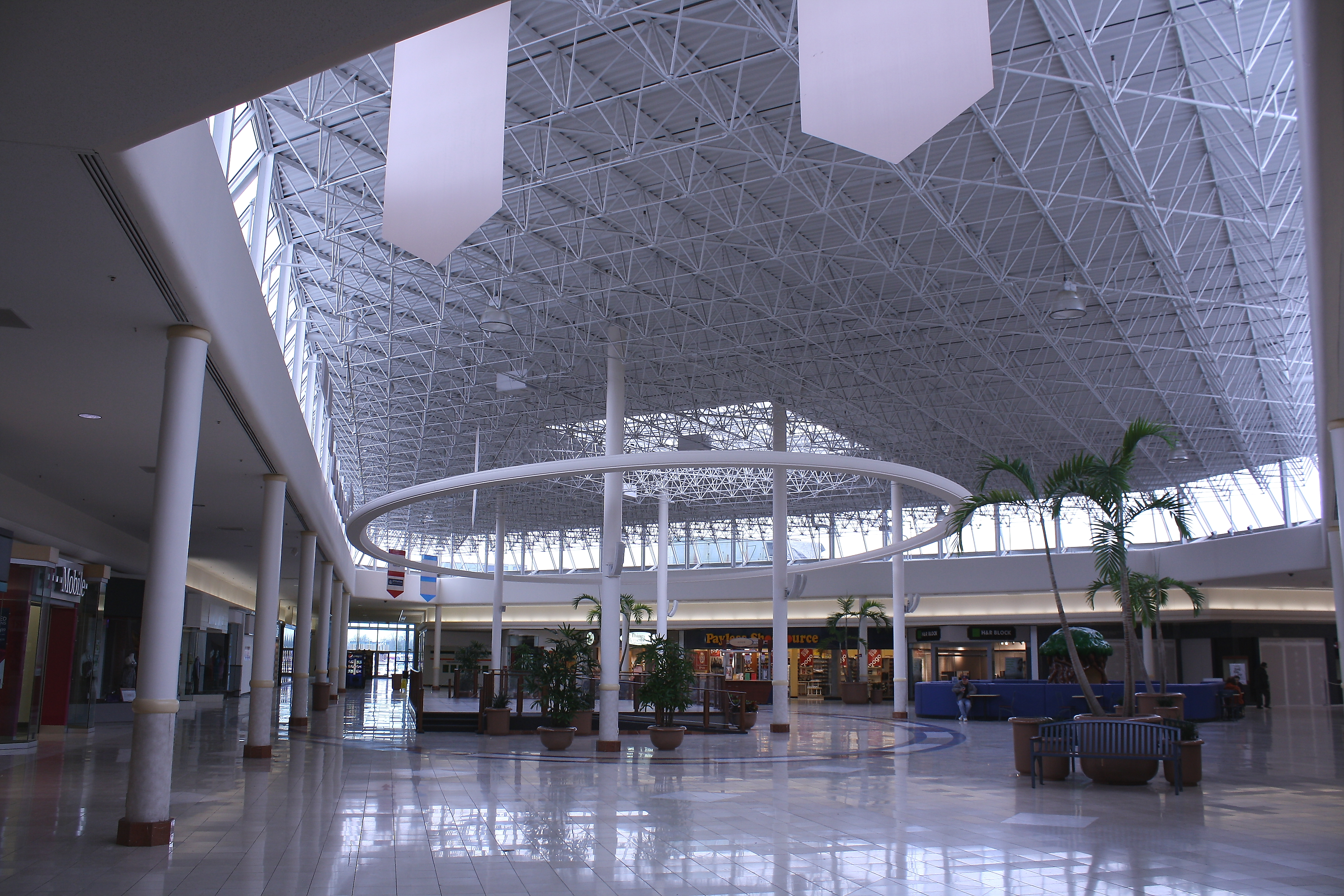
The Shoppes at Parma

During the population boom between 1950 and 1980, Parma's commercial sector grew to match its residential sector. Since the 1950s, Parma has fostered the growth of many small businesses and been an operating hub for companies including General Motors, Cox Cable, and formerly, the Union Carbide Research Center.

The Shoppes at Parma, formerly Parmatown Mall, is a commercial shopping district that totals approximately 800,000 square feet. It is located approximately 3 miles south of Cleveland's southern border at the southwest corner of Ridge Road and West Ridgewood Drive in central Cuyahoga County. It is anchored by JCPenney, Dick's Sporting Goods, Marc's and Walmart. The mall opened as a shopping plaza in 1956 and was enclosed in the mid-1960s.

The Ukrainian Village commercial district is located along State Road between Tuxedo Avenue and Grantwood Drive. This district was designated Ukrainian Village in September 2009. It hosts the Ukrainian Independence Day parade (August).

The Polish Village commercial district is located along Ridge Road between Pearl Road and Thornton Avenue. This district was designated Polish Village on May 1, 2011. It features a large number of small, family-owned businesses and medical offices. This area also hosts the Polish Constitution Day parade (May), St. Charles Carnival parade (July), Independence Day parade (July), and Christmas parade (December).

== Education ==
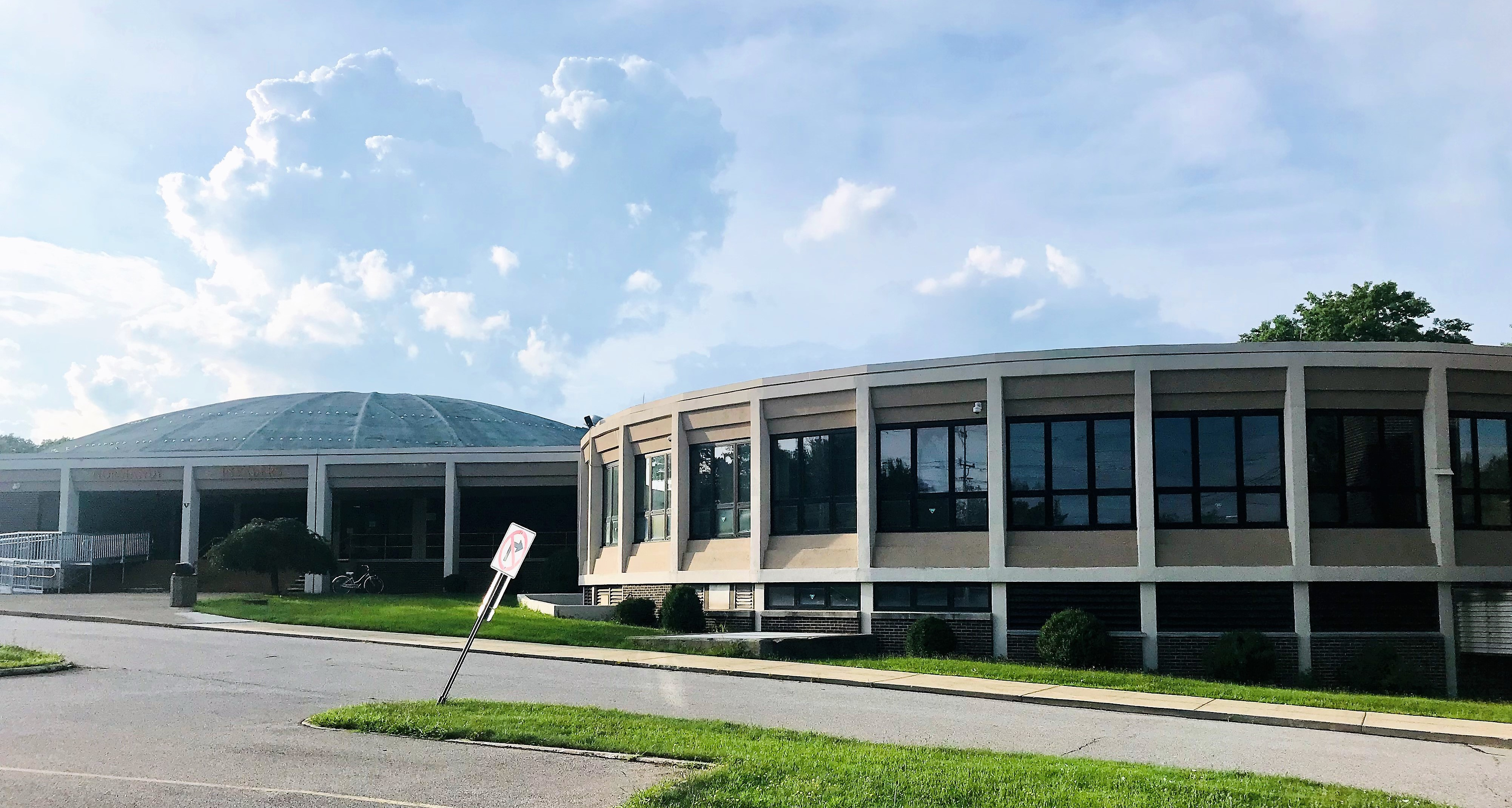
Normandy High School

The Parma City School District serves Parma, Parma Heights and Seven Hills. The District's sports stadium is Byers Field. All three high schools play golf at Ridgewood for their home course. The rivalry that exists between these schools is well documented. The school district has six elementary schools, three middle schools, and two high schools: Normandy High School and Valley Forge High School. The former Parma Senior High School operated from 1953 to 2023.

Constellation Schools: Parma Community public charter schools include two elementary schools, one middle school and one high school.

Parma has eight private primary schools and the private Padua Franciscan High School.

Bryant & Stratton College and Cuyahoga Community College have campuses in Parma.

== Transportation ==
Parma's major north–south roads, in order from west to east, are:

- West 130th Street, which forms part of the western border of Parma,
- Chevrolet Boulevard/Stumph Road/York Road,
- Ridge Road (State Route 3),
- West 54th Street
- State Road (State Route 94),
- Broadview Road (State Route 176), which forms part of the eastern boundary of Parma. The State Route 176 designation continues northward via the Jennings Freeway, connecting Parma to downtown Cleveland.

Its major east–west roads, in order from north to south, are:

- I-480, running just north of Parma's northern border,
- Brookpark Road (State Route 17), forming Parma's northern border with Cleveland,
- Snow Road,
- West Ridgewood Drive,
- West Pleasant Valley Road, and
- Sprague Road, which forms the southern border of Parma.

Also, Pearl Road (U.S. Route 42) runs from southwest to northeast through northern Parma for less than two miles (3 km).

The speed limit is 35 mph on most major thoroughfares in Parma. The exception is in business zones which have 25 mph speed limit.

Public transportation in Parma includes bus routes operated by the Greater Cleveland Regional Transit Authority, which serves the city of Cleveland and Cuyahoga County suburbs.

== Notable people ==
- Bill Balas, screenwriter, director and producer
- Jeremiah Wallace Baldock, Wisconsin State Assemblyman
- Michael Bierut, graphic designer
- Dante Boccuzzi, Michelin starred chef and restaurateur
- Hector Boiardi, better known as Chef Boyardee, died in Parma in 1985.
- Shya Chitaley, Curator of paleobotany at the Cleveland Museum of Natural History
- Carmen Cozza, football coach at Yale University.
- Timothy DeGeeter, state representative
- Dan Fritsche, NHL player, Minnesota Wild, Columbus Blue Jackets and New York Rangers
- Erich Gliebe, CEO of the white supremacist National Alliance, also professional boxer
- Michael T. Good, NASA astronaut
- Brian Holzinger, NHL, Buffalo Sabres
- James Hoye, umpire in Major League Baseball
- Dan Huberty, Republican member of the Texas House of Representatives
- Scott Jarvis, actor
- William Kowalski, author and educator
- Ted Levine, actor
- James A. Lovell, NASA Astronaut (Gemini 7, Gemini 12, Apollo 8 and Apollo 13 missions)
- Biagio Messina, television producer, filmmaker, and actor.
- Mike Mizanin, actor and professional wrestler known under the ring name The Miz
- Clint Nageotte, professional baseball player
- Alex Nedeljkovic, goaltender for the San Jose Sharks of the NHL.
- Ransom E. Olds, automotive pioneer
- Benjamin Orr (Orzechowski), best known as co-lead singer and bassist for The Cars.
- Kermit Poling, conductor, violinist and composer; music director of the South Arkansas Symphony; concertmaster of the Shreveport Symphony Orchestra
- Frank Romano, guitarist, songwriter and record producer
- Alan Ruck, actor (Ferris Bueller's Day Off, Spin City, Succession)

== In popular culture ==
=== Moon Over Parma ===
Local musician Bob "Mad Dog" McGuire penned a song entitled "Moon Over Parma" about an eccentric courtship that traverses the various suburbs of Cleveland. The song first received wide exposure on Big Chuck and Lil' John during its "New Talent Time" segment in 1983. Though McGuire was given the shepherd's crook, his song's sheet music was offered for free to those who wrote to the show requesting a copy.

The Drew Carey Show’s opening credits of its first season consisted of a caricature of Drew Carey — consisting of his face and a yellow tie — singing "Moon Over Parma" with an abridgment and some minor lyrical changes.

=== Parma Place ===
Occasionally, during the 1960s and 1970s, Parma was the target of light-hearted jabs by local movie show hosts Ghoulardi, Hoolihan, Big Chuck and Lil’ John, and The Ghoul, due to its central European image promoted by the friendly rivalry between Ernie "Ghoulardi" Anderson and "Big Chuck" Schodowski and contrary to actual demographics. Ghoulardi, the horror host of late night Shock Theater at WJW-TV, Channel 8, in Cleveland from January 13, 1963, through December 16, 1966, made a series of shorts called "Parma Place" and focused on an alleged love of white socks, pink flamingos, chrome balls, kielbasa, pierogi and the polka.

=== Novak v. City of Parma ===
In March 2016, Anthony Novak, a resident of Parma, created a parody Facebook page superficially resembling the local police department's official page, with outlandish, satirical posts easily distinguished from actual police public-affairs content. Despite the page being voluntarily removed after 12 hours, the Parma Police subsequently obtained warrants and raided Novak's apartment in the middle of the night three weeks later, seizing electronic devices belonging Novak and his roommate, and arresting and jailing Novak for four days until he could make bail. Novak was charged with felony disruption of police operations, but was acquitted at trial; a subsequent lawsuit against the police for civil rights violations was rebuffed by the Sixth Circuit, citing qualified immunity. Novak's appeal to the U.S. Supreme Court garnered legal briefs from the ACLU and Cato Institute, but gained notoriety because of a supporting brief filed by satirical website The Onion.
