= Parma Heights, Ohio =

- City
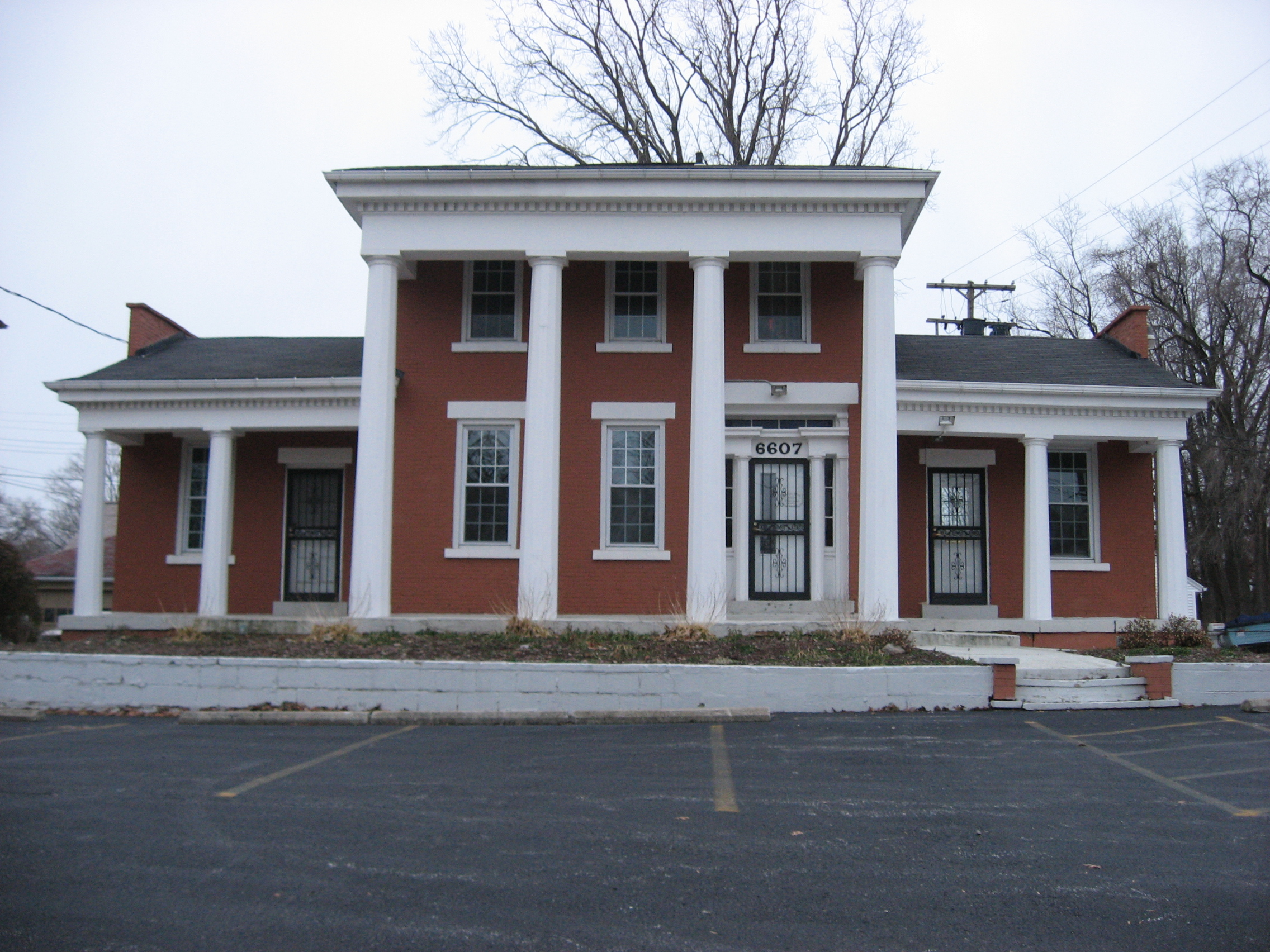
- Robert W. Henry House on Pearl Road

- Interactive map of Parma Heights, Ohio
- Location within Ohio Location within the United States
- Coordinates: 41°23′10″N 081°45′48″W
- Country: United States
- State: Ohio
- County: Cuyahoga

Government
  - Mayor: Marie Gallo (D)

Area
  - Total: 4.20 sq mi (10.87 km^{2})
  - Land: 4.20 sq mi (10.87 km^{2})
  - Water: 0 sq mi (0.00 km^{2})
- Elevation: 856 ft (261 m)

Population (2020)
  - Total: 20,863
  - Density: 4,971.4/sq mi (1,919.47/km^{2})
- Time zone: UTC-5 (Eastern (EST))
  - Summer (DST): UTC-4 (EDT)
- ZIP code: 44130
- Area codes: 440, 216, 436
- FIPS code: 39-61028
- GNIS feature ID: 1056914
- Website: www.parmaheightsoh.gov

Parma Heights is a city in Cuyahoga County, Ohio, United States. The city's population was 20,863 as of the 2020 census. It is a suburb of Cleveland, it is a part of the Cleveland metropolitan area. Parma Heights is surrounded on the north, east and south by the larger city of Parma. The cities of Brook Park and Middleburg Heights form most of the western border.

== History ==
=== "Greenbriar" (1806–1826) ===
In 1806, the area that was to become Parma and Parma Heights was originally surveyed by Abraham Tappan, a surveyor for the Connecticut Land Company, and was known as Township 6 - Range 13. This designation gave the town its first identity in the Western Reserve. Soon after, Township 6 - Range 13 was commonly referred to as "Greenbriar," supposedly for the rambling bush that grew there. Benajah Fay, his wife Ruth Wilcox Fay, and their ten children, arrivals from Lewis County, New York, were the first settlers in 1816. The area of Greenbriar that was to later become Parma Heights was first settled in 1817. It was around that time that Greenbriar, under a newly organized government seat under Brooklyn Township, began attending to its own governmental needs.

=== Parma Township (1826–1911) ===
Self-government started to gain in popularity by the time the new Greenbriar settlement contained twenty householders. However, prior to the establishment of the new township, the name Greenbriar was replaced by the name Parma. This was largely due to Dr. David Long who had recently returned from Italy and "impressed with the grandeur and beauty...was reminded of Parma, Italy and...persuaded the early townspeople that the territory deserved a better name than Greenbriar."

Thus, on March 7, 1826, a resolution was passed ordering the construction of the new township. It stated,

"On the petition of sundry inhabitants for a new township to be organized and erected comprising No. 6 in the 13th Range. Ordered that said Township No. 6 in the 13th Range be set off and erected into a new Township by the name of Parma, to be bounded by the original lines of said Township."

On the same day, a public notice was issued to qualified electors by the County Commissioners. They met at the house of Samuel Freeman on April 3, 1826, to elect township officers according to the law. It was then that the first eleven officers were elected to lead the new government.

During this time, Parma Township remained largely agricultural. The first schoolhouse was a log structure built on the hill at the northern corner of what is now Parma Heights Cemetery. A memorial plate on a stone marks the spot. In 1827, the township was divided into road districts. The Broadview Road of today was then known as Town Line Road as well as Independence Road. Ridge Road was known then as Center Road as it cut through the center of town. York Road was then known as York Street as arrivals from the state of New York settled there. Pearl Road then had many names which included Medina Wooster Pike, Wooster Pike, the Cleveland Columbus Road, and the Brighton and Parma Plank Road.

A stone house, known as the Henninger House, was built in 1849, occupied by several generations of Henningers, and is still standing today. More than 160 years ago, this house rested on one of the highest points in Cuyahoga County which provided visibility for the entire northeastern part of Parma Township. This was also the same site that the Erie Indians, centuries before, also stood to read and send fire signals as well as pray to their spirits.

By 1850, the US census listed Parma Township's population at 1,329. However, the rising population of the township had slowed over the decades. The Civil War affected Parma much like it did other towns and villages in the nation. Three out of four homes sent father or sons, or sometimes both, to fight in the war. By 1910, the population of the township had increased to 1,631.

=== Village of Parma Heights (1911–1956) ===
In 1911, Parma Heights, due to the temperance mood of the day, separated itself from the Parma Township by a vote of 42 to 32 and was incorporated as a village comprising 4.13 square miles.

"A main reason for establishing the village of Parma Heights was to get a town marshal...There is one saloon in the territory...some pretty rough crowds Sundays have disturbed the quiet of the neighborhood...wanted it closed on Sundays...To do this they wished a town marshal. They couldn't have a town marshal without becoming a village, so they became one."

By 1920, census records show that Parma Heights contained 310 residents.

=== City of Parma Heights (1956-Present) ===
In December 1956, Parma Heights was incorporated as a city, under the administration of Roy F. Cappallo, Mayor.

On November 26, 2014, an early-morning fire destroyed the office of Mayor Mike Byrne and resulted in severe damage to city hall. Investigators determined the fire was intentionally set using a Molotov cocktail.

== Geography ==
Parma Heights is located at 41°23′10″N 81°45′48″W (41.386051, -81.763459).

According to the United States Census Bureau, the city has a total area of 4.19 square miles (10.85 km^{2}), all land.

== Demographics ==
Historical population
Census	Pop.	Note	%±
1920	310		—
1930	960		209.7%
1940	1,330		38.5%
1950	3,901		193.3%
1960	18,100		364.0%
1970	27,192		50.2%
1980	23,112		−15.0%
1990	21,448		−7.2%
2000	21,659		1.0%
2010	20,718		−4.3%
2020	20,863		0.7%
2025 (est.)	20,327		−2.6%

=== Racial and ethnic composition ===
Parma Heights city, Ohio – Racial and ethnic composition Note: the US Census treats Hispanic/Latino as an ethnic category. This table excludes Latinos from the racial categories and assigns them to a separate category. Hispanics/Latinos may be of any race.
Race / Ethnicity (NH = Non-Hispanic)	Pop 2000	Pop 2010	Pop 2020	% 2000	% 2010	% 2020
White alone (NH)	20,300	18,400	16,646	93.73%	88.81%	79.79%
Black or African American alone (NH)	243	536	1,183	1.12%	2.59%	5.67%
Native American or Alaska Native alone (NH)	28	30	22	0.13%	0.14%	0.11%
Asian alone (NH)	505	622	815	2.33%	3.00%	3.91%
Native Hawaiian or Pacific Islander alone (NH)	3	6	2	0.01%	0.03%	0.01%
Other race alone (NH)	8	37	74	0.04%	0.18%	0.35%
Mixed race or Multiracial (NH)	221	294	775	1.02%	1.42%	3.71%
Hispanic or Latino (any race)	351	793	1,346	1.62%	3.83%	6.45%
Total	21,659	20,718	20,863	100.00%	100.00%	100.00%

=== Languages ===
88.5% spoke English, 1.4% Ukrainian, 1.3% Spanish, 1.3% Polish, 1.2% Romanian, 1.2% Italian, and 0.9% German and Hungarian.

=== 2020 census ===
As of the 2020 census, Parma Heights had a population of 20,863, and the median age was 43.2 years. 17.5% of residents were under the age of 18 and 21.5% of residents were 65 years of age or older, with 90.8 males for every 100 females and 87.6 males for every 100 females age 18 and over.

100.0% of residents lived in urban areas, while 0.0% lived in rural areas.

There were 9,689 households in Parma Heights, of which 22.1% had children under the age of 18 living in them. Of all households, 35.8% were married-couple households, 21.6% were households with a male householder and no spouse or partner present, and 34.8% were households with a female householder and no spouse or partner present. About 39.6% of all households were made up of individuals and 18.3% had someone living alone who was 65 years of age or older.

There were 10,211 housing units, of which 5.1% were vacant. The homeowner vacancy rate was 1.3% and the rental vacancy rate was 5.0%.

Racial composition as of the 2020 census
Race	Number	Percent
White	16,996	81.5%
Black or African American	1,245	6.0%
American Indian and Alaska Native	37	0.2%
Asian	831	4.0%
Native Hawaiian and Other Pacific Islander	2	0.0%
Some other race	452	2.2%
Two or more races	1,300	6.2%
Hispanic or Latino (of any race)	1,346	6.5%

=== 2010 census ===
As of the 2010 United States census, there were 20,718 people, 9,534 households, and 5,298 families residing in the city. The population density was 4,944.6 inhabitants per square mile (1,909.1/km^{2}). There were 10,295 housing units at an average density of 2,457.0 per square mile (948.7/km^{2}). The racial makeup of the city was 91.1% White, 2.8% African American, 0.2% Native American, 3.0% Asian, 1.0% from other races, and 1.8% from two or more races. Hispanic or Latino of any race were 3.8% of the population.

There were 9,534 households, of which 23.4% had children under the age of 18 living with them, 39.7% were married couples living together, 11.7% had a female householder with no husband present, 4.2% had a male householder with no wife present, and 44.4% were non-families. 39.1% of all households were made up of individuals, and 18.6% had someone living alone who was 65 years of age or older. The average household size was 2.15 and the average family size was 2.89.

The median age in the city was 43.2 years. 18.9% of residents were under the age of 18; 8.2% were between the ages of 18 and 24; 24.9% were from 25 to 44; 27.6% were from 45 to 64; and 20.5% were 65 years of age or older. The gender makeup of the city was 46.5% male and 53.5% female.

=== 2000 census ===
As of the 2000 United States census, there were 21,659 people, 9,823 households, and 5,825 families residing in the city. The population density was 5,158.6 inhabitants per square mile (1,991.7/km^{2}). There were 10,263 housing units at an average density of 2,444.4 per square mile (943.8/km^{2}). The racial makeup of the city was 94.76% White, 1.17% African American, 0.13% Native American, 2.33% Asian, 0.01% Pacific Islander, 0.45% from other races, and 1.15% from two or more races. Hispanic or Latino of any race were 1.62% of the population.

There were 9,823 households, out of which 22.6% had children under the age of 18 living with them, 46.0% were married couples living together, 9.9% had a female householder with no husband present, and 40.7% were non-families. 36.5% of all households were made up of individuals, and 20.2% had someone living alone who was 65 years of age or older. The average household size was 2.18 and the average family size was 2.86.

In the city the population was spread out, with 19.1% under the age of 18, 7.2% from 18 to 24, 27.5% from 25 to 44, 21.1% from 45 to 64, and 25.1% who were 65 years of age or older. The median age was 42 years. For every 100 females, there were 86.0 males. For every 100 females age 18 and over, there were 81.9 males.

The median income for a household in the city was $36,985, and the median income for a family was $48,641. Males had a median income of $39,034 versus $27,564 for females. The per capita income for the city was $20,522. About 5.4% of families and 7.6% of the population were below the poverty line, including 10.7% of those under age 18 and 7.0% of those age 65 or over.

== Government ==
There are seven council members serving at large. Every two years there is an election. Four positions are open. The top three candidates are each elected for a four-year term. The fourth candidate is awarded a two-year term.

The current mayor of Parma Heights is former city council member Marie Gallo, who beat fellow council member Anthony Stavole in a landslide election in November 2021. Gallo was sworn into office on January 1, 2022.

== Education ==
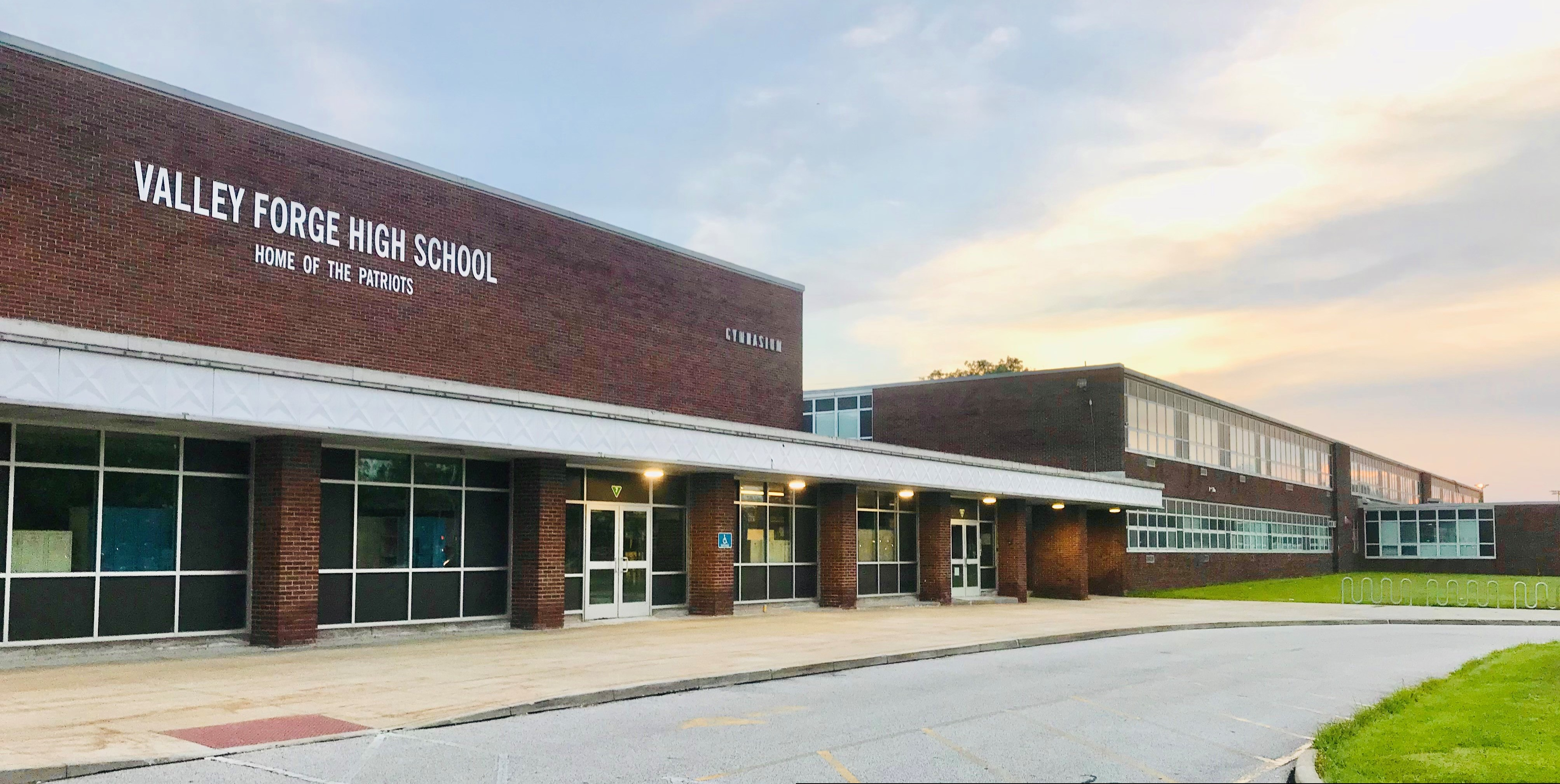
Valley Forge High School

Parma Heights is included in the Parma City School District. Parma Park Elementary School (grades K–4) and Valley Forge High School (grades 9–12) are located within the city limits. Private schools include Holy Name High School, Holy Family School, Incarnate Word Academy, and Parma Heights Christian Academy.

Parma Heights is home to the Western Campus of Cuyahoga Community College.
