= San Diego Stadium =

California multi-purpose stadium, 1967–2020

- The Q The Murph
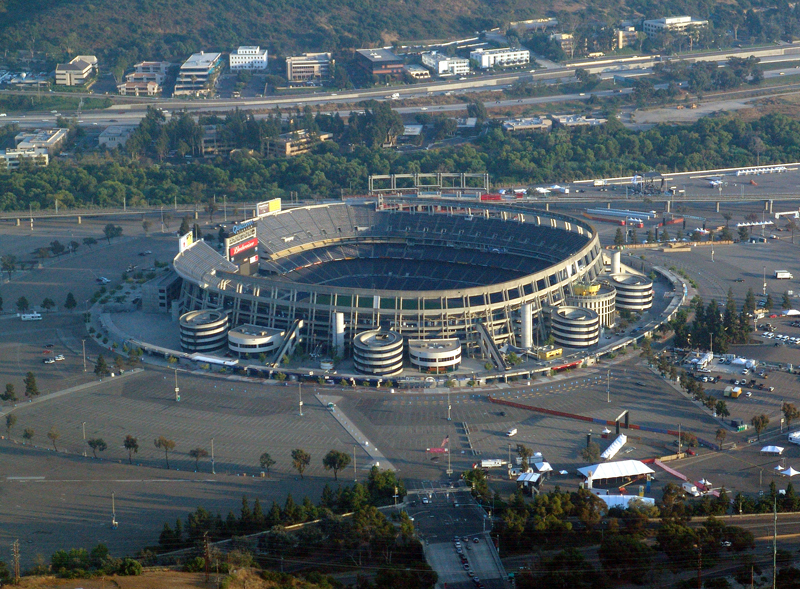
- Aerial view from the north in 2005

- Location in the United States Location in California
- Interactive map of San Diego Stadium
- Former names: San Diego Stadium (1967–1980); Jack Murphy Stadium (1981–1997); Qualcomm Stadium (1997–2017); SDCCU Stadium (2017–2020)
- Address: 9449 Friars Road
- Location: San Diego, California, United States
- Coordinates: 32°46′59″N 117°7′10″W
- Owner: San Diego State University
- Operator: San Diego State University
- Capacity: 70,561 (Football, Chargers); 67,544 (Baseball); 54,000 (Football, Aztecs)
- Surface: Bandera Bermuda Grass
- Field size: Left field 330 (1969); 327 (1982); Left-center & Right-center; 375 (1969); 370 (1982); Center field 420 (1969); 410 (1973); 420 (1978); 405 (1982); Right field 330 (1969); 327 (1982); 330 (1996); Backstop; 80 feet (1969); 75 (1982)
- Public transit: San Diego Trolley; Green Line at Stadium

Construction
- Groundbreaking: December 18, 1965
- Opened: August 20, 1967
- Closed: March 2020
- Demolished: December 2020 – March 22, 2021
- Cost: $27.75 million ($268 million in 2025 dollars)
- Architect: Frank L. Hope and Associates
- General contractor: Robertson/Larsen/Donovan

Tenants
- American football San Diego State Aztecs (NCAA) (1967–2019); San Diego Chargers (AFL/NFL) (1967–2016); Holiday Bowl (NCAA) (1978–2019); Poinsettia Bowl (NCAA) (2005–2016); San Diego Fleet (AAF) (2019) Baseball San Diego Padres (PCL) (1968); San Diego Padres (MLB) (1969–2003) Soccer San Diego Sockers (NASL) (1978–1984); San Diego 1904 FC (NISA) (2019)

San Diego Stadium was a multi-purpose stadium in San Diego, California, United States. It opened in 1967 as San Diego Stadium; it was renamed Jack Murphy Stadium for sportswriter Jack Murphy from 1981 to 1997. From 1997 to 2017, the stadium's naming rights were owned by Qualcomm; it was named Qualcomm Stadium. The naming rights expired on June 14, 2017, and were purchased by San Diego County Credit Union, renaming the stadium to SDCCU Stadium on September 19, 2017; those naming rights expired in December 2020. Demolition of San Diego Stadium began in December 2020; its last freestanding section fell on March 22, 2021.

The stadium was the longtime home for two teams of the major professional sports leagues: the San Diego Chargers of the National Football League (NFL) and the San Diego Padres of Major League Baseball (MLB). The Chargers played at the stadium from 1967 through the 2016 season, after which they moved to the Greater Los Angeles area to become the Los Angeles Chargers. The Padres played home games at the stadium from their founding in 1969 through the 2003 season, then moved to Petco Park in downtown San Diego. Additionally, the stadium hosted the San Diego Sockers of the North American Soccer League (NASL) from 1978 through the 1984 season.

San Diego Stadium was the home of the San Diego State Aztecs football team from 1967 through 2019. A college football bowl game, the Holiday Bowl, was held in the stadium every December from 1978 through 2019. The stadium was home to a second college bowl game, the Poinsettia Bowl, from 2005 until its discontinuation following the 2016 edition. In 2020, San Diego State University (SDSU) purchased the stadium site, with plans to develop the area into a noncontiguous campus expansion following the stadium's demolition, now known as SDSU Mission Valley. Snapdragon Stadium opened on the site in 2022 as the new home for the Aztecs football team.

The stadium hosted three Super Bowls: XXII in 1988, XXXII in 1998, and XXXVII in 2003, being the most recent multi-purpose stadium to host the NFL's title game. It also hosted the 1984 and 1998 World Series, the 1978 and 1992 Major League Baseball All-Star Game, and games of the 1996 and 1998 National League Division Series and the 1984 and 1998 National League Championship Series. It was the only stadium ever to host both the Super Bowl and the World Series in the same year (1998), and was one of three stadiums to host the Super Bowl, World Series, and the MLB All-Star Game, along with the Hubert H. Humphrey Metrodome in Minneapolis and the Los Angeles Memorial Coliseum in Los Angeles.

== History ==
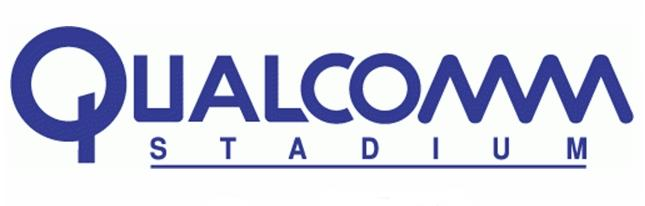
Qualcomm Stadium logo (1997–2017)

In the early 1960s, local sportswriter Jack Murphy, the brother of New York Mets broadcaster Bob Murphy, began to build up support for a multi-purpose stadium for San Diego. In November 1965, a $27 million bond was passed allowing construction to begin on a stadium, which was designed in the Brutalist style. Construction on the stadium began one month later. When completed, the facility was named San Diego Stadium.

The stadium was the first of the square-circle "octorad" style, which was thought to be an improvement over the other multi-purpose stadiums of the time for hosting both football and baseball (the second and last of this style was the since-imploded Veterans Stadium). Despite the theoretical improvements of this style, most of the seats were still very far away from the action on the field, especially during baseball games.

The Chargers (then a member of the American Football League) played the first game ever at the stadium on August 20, 1967. San Diego Stadium had a capacity of around 50,000; the three-tier grandstand was in the shape of a horseshoe, with the east end low (consisting of only one tier, partially topped by a large scoreboard). The Chargers were the main tenant of the stadium until 1968, when the AAA Pacific Coast League San Diego Padres baseball team played its last season in the stadium, following their move from the minor league-sized Westgate Park. Due to expansion of Major League Baseball, this team was replaced by the current San Diego Padres major-league team beginning in the 1969 season. (The Padres moved out of the stadium following the 2003 season.) The original scoreboard, a black-and-white scoreboard created by All American Scoreboards, was replaced in 1978 by one manufactured by American Sign and Indicator, which was the first full-color outdoor scoreboard ever built. This was replaced in 1987 by a White Way Sign scoreboard, in which the video screen is surrounded almost entirely by three message boards. The original video board was replaced in 1996 by a Sony JumboTron, with a second JumboTron installed behind the opposite end zone (third base in the stadium's baseball configuration).

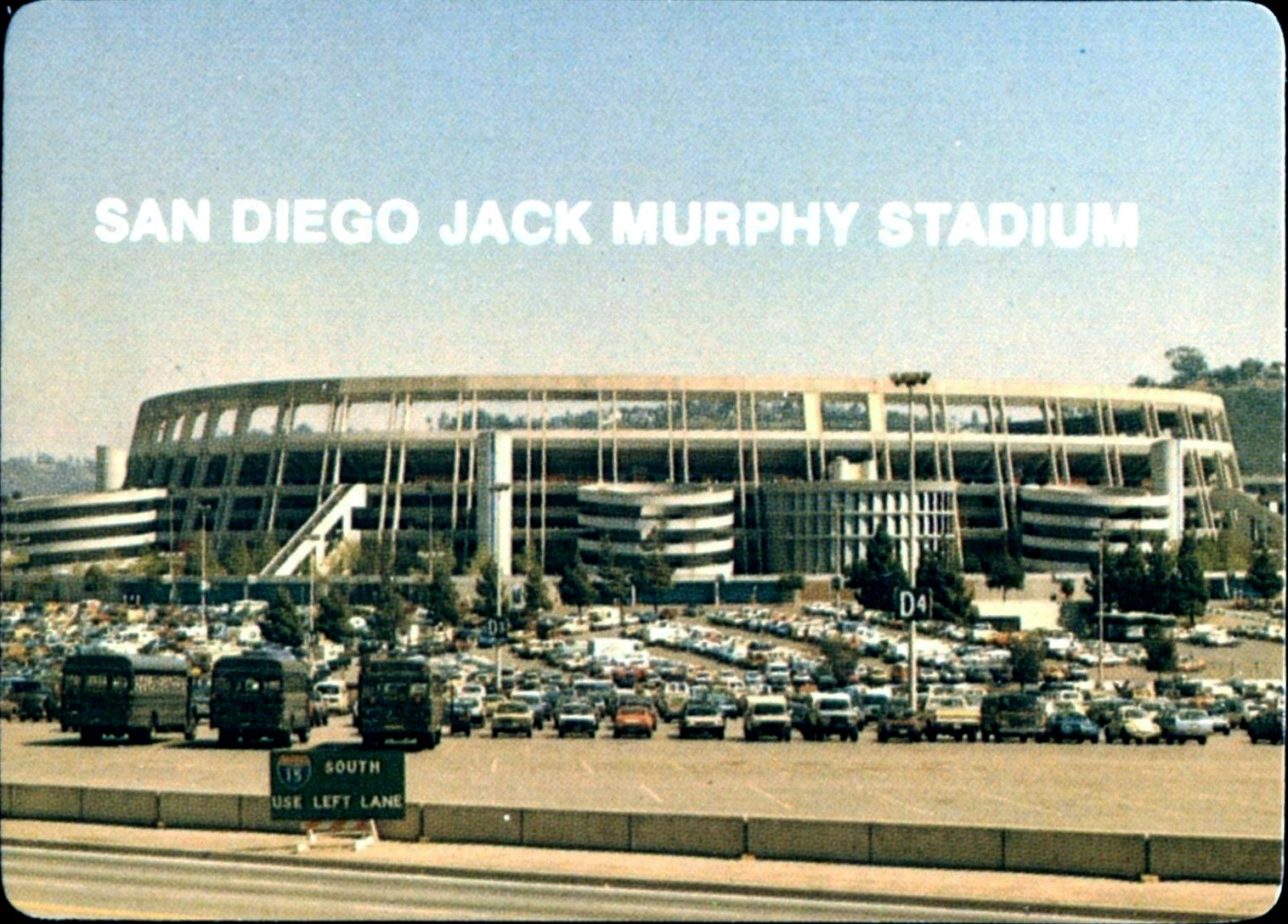
Exterior of then-San Diego Jack Murphy Stadium in 1984

After Jack Murphy's death in September 1980, San Diego Stadium was renamed San Diego Jack Murphy Stadium by a 6–2 vote of the San Diego City Council on January 6, 1981. In 1983, over 9,000 bleachers were added to the lower deck on the open end of the stadium raising the capacity to 59,022.

The most substantial addition was completed in 1997, when the stadium was fully enclosed, with the exception of where the scoreboard is located. Nearly 11,000 seats were added in readiness for Super Bowl XXXII in 1998, bringing the capacity to 70,561. Also in 1997, the facility was renamed Qualcomm Stadium after Qualcomm Corporation paid $18 million for the naming rights. The naming rights belonged to Qualcomm until 2017, after which the rights were purchased by San Diego County Credit Union. In order to continue to honor Murphy, the city named the stadium site Jack Murphy Field. However, as part of the naming agreement Jack Murphy Field was not allowed to be used alongside Qualcomm Stadium. Some San Diegans, however, still refer to the stadium as "Jack Murphy" or simply "The Murph". Before his death in 2004, Bob Murphy still referred to it as Jack Murphy Stadium during New York Mets broadcasts, even after it was renamed. However, this renovation relegated the Padres within their own stadium, as the city gave the Chargers full financial control of the 113 luxury suites. The stadium was temporarily renamed "Snapdragon Stadium" for 10 days in December 2011 as a marketing tie in for Qualcomm's Snapdragon brand. The legality of the temporary name change was challenged at the time, since it was agreed to unilaterally by San Diego's mayor, without approval from the City Council and against the advice of the City Attorney. The Aztecs' new stadium, built in 2022 after the demolition of SDCCU Stadium, has the permanent name of Snapdragon Stadium.

With the departure of the Padres to Petco Park following the 2003 season and even beforehand, there was much talk of replacing the increasingly obsolete (by NFL standards) stadium with a more modern, football-only one. Also, the NFL had demanded a new stadium if San Diego was to host another Super Bowl; however, the city struggled to fund such a new stadium. On January 12, 2017, the Chargers announced they were moving to Los Angeles and now play at SoFi Stadium with the Los Angeles Rams. In 2018, San Diego State University announced the construction of a new Aztec Stadium (later renamed Snapdragon Stadium, which would be completed in 2022) on an expansion part of campus on the site of the stadium and parking lot.

SDCCU Stadium logo (2017–2020)

On December 27, 2019, the stadium hosted the San Diego County Credit Union Holiday Bowl, a college football bowl game between Iowa and USC (Iowa won the game), this was the final sporting event ever played at the stadium. Demolition of the stadium commenced in December 2020.

=== Super Bowls (NFL) ===
| Date | Super Bowl | NFC Champion | Points | AFC Champion | Points | Attendance |
|---|---|---|---|---|---|---|
| January 31, 1988 | XXII | Washington Redskins | 42 | Denver Broncos | 10 | 73,302 |
| January 25, 1998 | XXXII | Green Bay Packers | 24 | Denver Broncos | 31 | 68,912 |
| January 26, 2003 | XXXVII | Tampa Bay Buccaneers | 48 | Oakland Raiders | 21 | 67,603 |

=== All-Star Games (MLB) ===
| Date | All-Star Game | Winner | Runs | Loser | Runs | Attendance |
|---|---|---|---|---|---|---|
| July 11, 1978 | 1978 (49th) | National League (NL) | 7 | American League (AL) | 3 | 51,549 |
| July 14, 1992 | 1992 (63rd) | American League (AL) | 13 | National League (NL) | 6 | 59,372 |

== Configurations ==
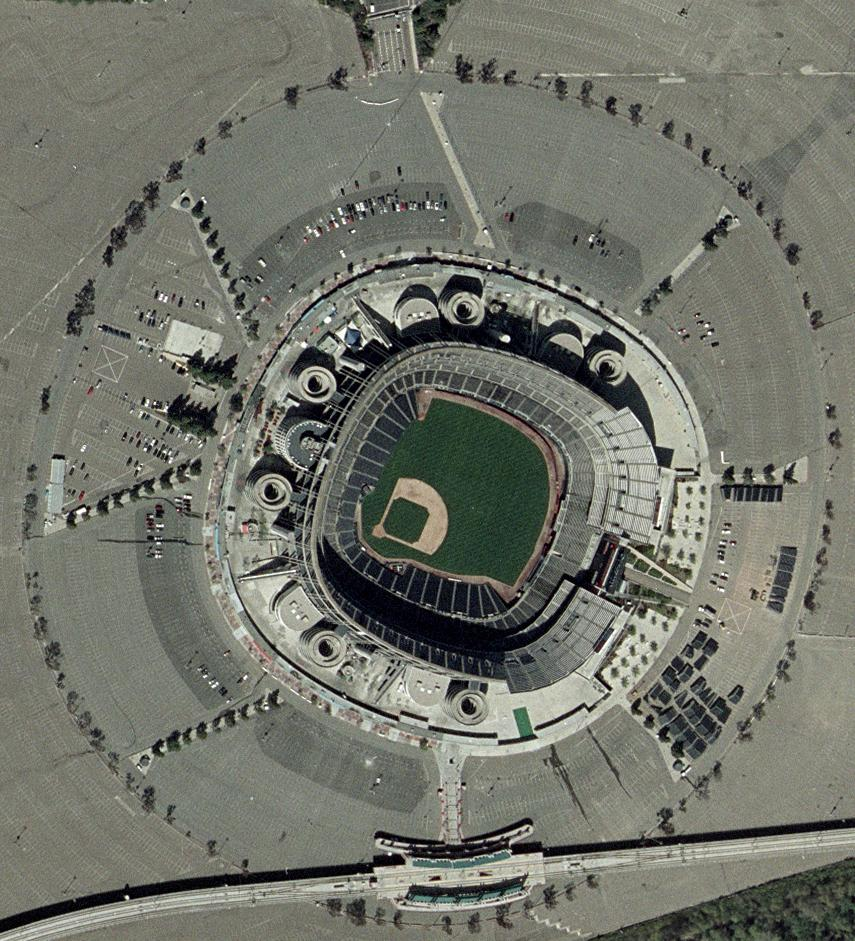
Satellite view of then-Qualcomm Stadium in March 2003, with the trolley line at the bottom of the image.

In order to accommodate the dimensions of both football and baseball fields, the stadium was constructed with half of the lower (Field Level) level seating built of permanent concrete (in the southern quadrant of the stadium), and the other half of portable modular construction using aluminum or steel framing.

When the stadium was configured for baseball, the portable sections would be placed in the western quadrant of the stadium along the third base-left field side. Open bullpens were located along both foul lines just beyond the ends of the Field-level seats. In the Padres' final five seasons at the stadium from 1999 to 2003, the home plate area took on the shape of home plate itself (as opposed to the standard circle); this feature is seen in Detroit's Comerica Park today.

In the football configuration, the portable seating sections were placed in the northern quadrant of the stadium (covering what is used as left field in the baseball configuration) to allow for the football field to be laid out east–west (along the first base/right field foul line, with the western end zone placed in the area occupied by the portable seating sections in the baseball configuration, and the eastern end zone along the right-center field wall).

Doorways were cut in the walls of the stadium in order to allow access to these seats from the tunnel below the Plaza level in both configurations (in baseball configuration, the football doors could be seen above the left field inner wall; in football configuration, the baseball doors were visible above the west end zone, opposite the scoreboard). These doors were rolling metal overhead doors, with the field side painted to match the surrounding walls facing the field.

=== Seating capacity ===
Baseball
| Years | Capacity |
|---|---|
| 1967–1972 | 50,000 |
| 1973 | 44,790 |
| 1974–1975 | 47,634 |
| 1976 | 47,491 |
| 1977–1978 | 48,460 |
| 1979 | 51,362 |
| 1980 | 48,443 |
| 1981–1982 | 51,362 |
| 1983 | 51,319 |
| 1984 | 58,671 |
| 1985 | 58,396 |
| 1986–1988 | 58,433 |
| 1989–1990 | 59,022 |
| 1991 | 59,254 |
| 1992 | 59,700 |
| 1993 | 59,411 |
| 1994 | 46,510 |
| 1995 | 47,972 |
| 1996 | 49,639 |
| 1997 | 59,771 |
| 1998 | 67,544 |
| 1999–2002 | 66,307 |
| 2003 | 63,890 |

Football
| Years | Capacity |
|---|---|
| 1967–1981 | 52,596 |
| 1982–1983 | 52,675 |
| 1984 | 60,100 |
| 1985–1991 | 60,750 |
| 1992–1996 | 60,836 |
| 1997–1998 | 71,350 |
| 1999–2017 | 70,561 |

== Tenants ==
=== Padres ===
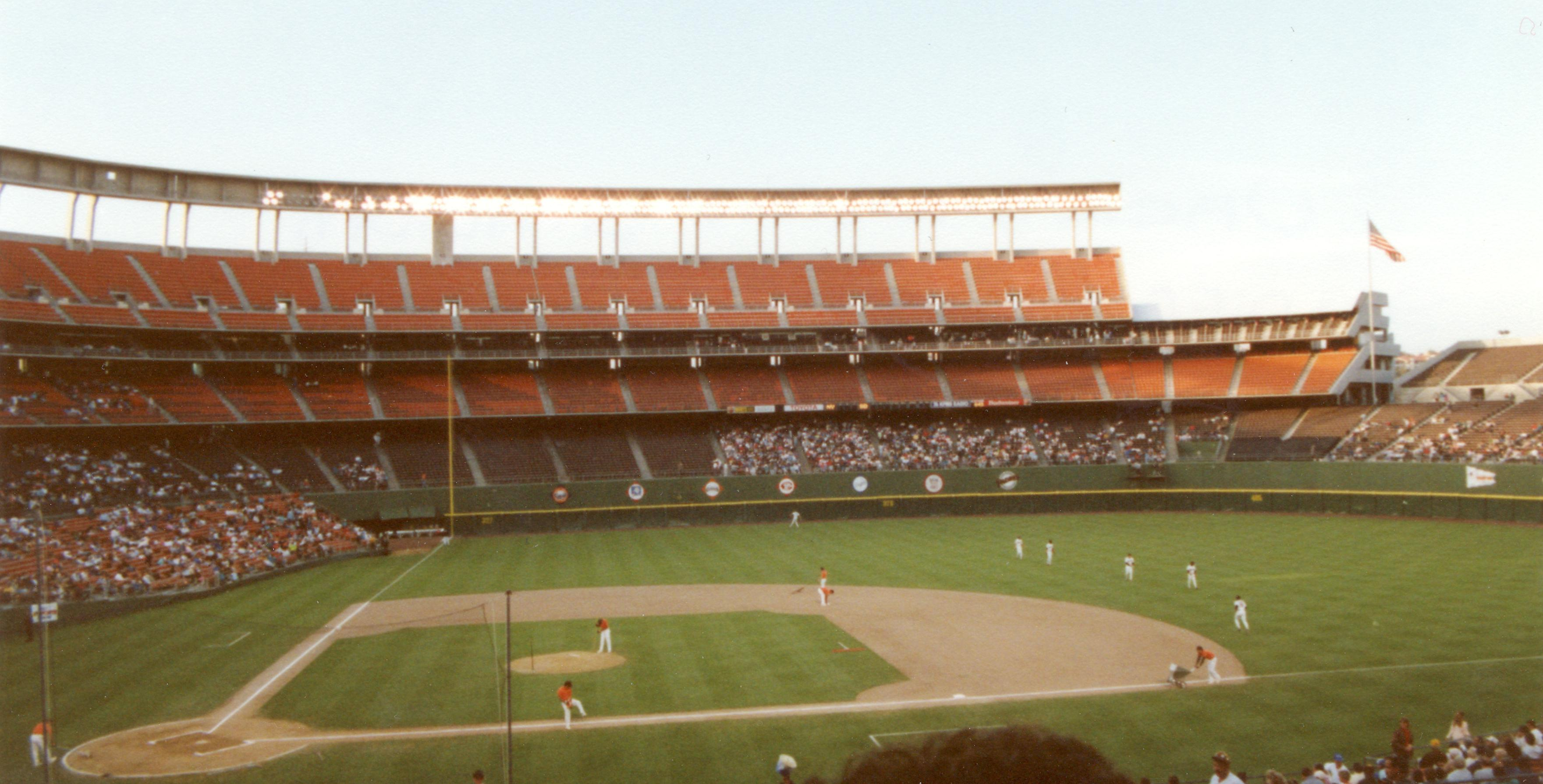
A Padres game at San Diego Jack Murphy Stadium in 1990, before upper deck expansion.

From their inception in 1969 until the end of 2003, when they moved into Petco Park in the downtown area, the National League's San Diego Padres called the stadium home.

The field dimensions varied slightly over the years. In 1969, the distance from home plate to the left and right field wall was 330 feet (100 m), the distance to the left- and right-center field power alleys was 375 feet (114 m), and the distance from home plate to center field was 420 feet (130 m). A 19-foot (5.8 m) wall, whose top was the rim of the Plaza level, surrounded the outfield, making home runs difficult to hit. Later, an eight-foot fence was erected, cutting the distances to 327, 368, and 405 feet (123 m), respectively. In 1996, a note of asymmetry was introduced when a 19-foot (5.8 m) high scoreboard displaying out-of-town scores was erected along the right-field wall near the foul pole and deemed to be in play, and so the distances to right field and right-center field were 330 feet (100 m) and 370 feet (110 m), respectively, while the remaining dimensions remained the same.

Orel Hershiser broke Don Drysdale's scoreless inning streak at Jack Murphy Stadium on September 28, 1988, as the Los Angeles Dodgers played the San Diego Padres. Rickey Henderson collected his 3000th major league base hit at Jack Murphy Stadium on October 7, 2001 as a Padre, in what was also the last major league game for Tony Gwynn, the eight-time National League batting champion and Hall of Famer who played his entire career with San Diego. It was also before a Padres game where comedian Roseanne Barr gave her infamous rendition of "The Star-Spangled Banner" in 1990.

=== Chargers ===
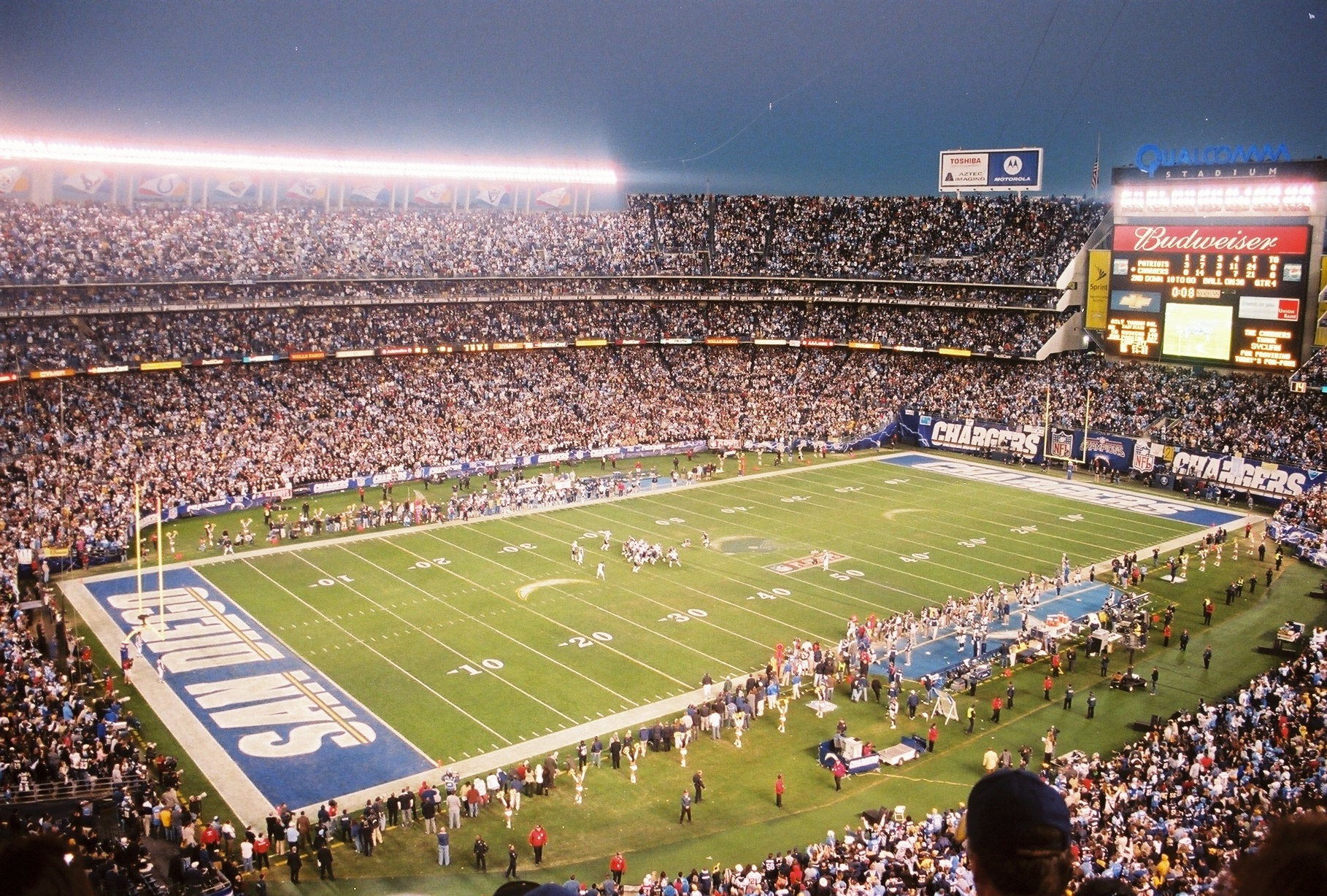
An NFL Chargers playoff game in 2007

The stadium was the site of the 1980 AFC Championship Game, which the "Bolts" lost to their AFC West and in-state rival, the Oakland Raiders, 34–27. The Chargers also hosted Wild Card and Divisional Playoff games in 1979, 1980, 1992, 1994, 1995, 2004, 2006, 2007, 2008 and 2009, going 5–6 in all playoff games held at the stadium. The Chargers won all their games at the stadium against the Detroit Lions (5–0—0) and Jacksonville Jaguars (4–0—0), but lost all their meetups against the Atlanta Falcons (0–6—0), Carolina Panthers (0–3—0), and Green Bay Packers (0–6—0). The Chargers moved to Dignity Health Sports Park in Carson, a suburb of Los Angeles, following the 2016 NFL season.

=== Aztecs ===
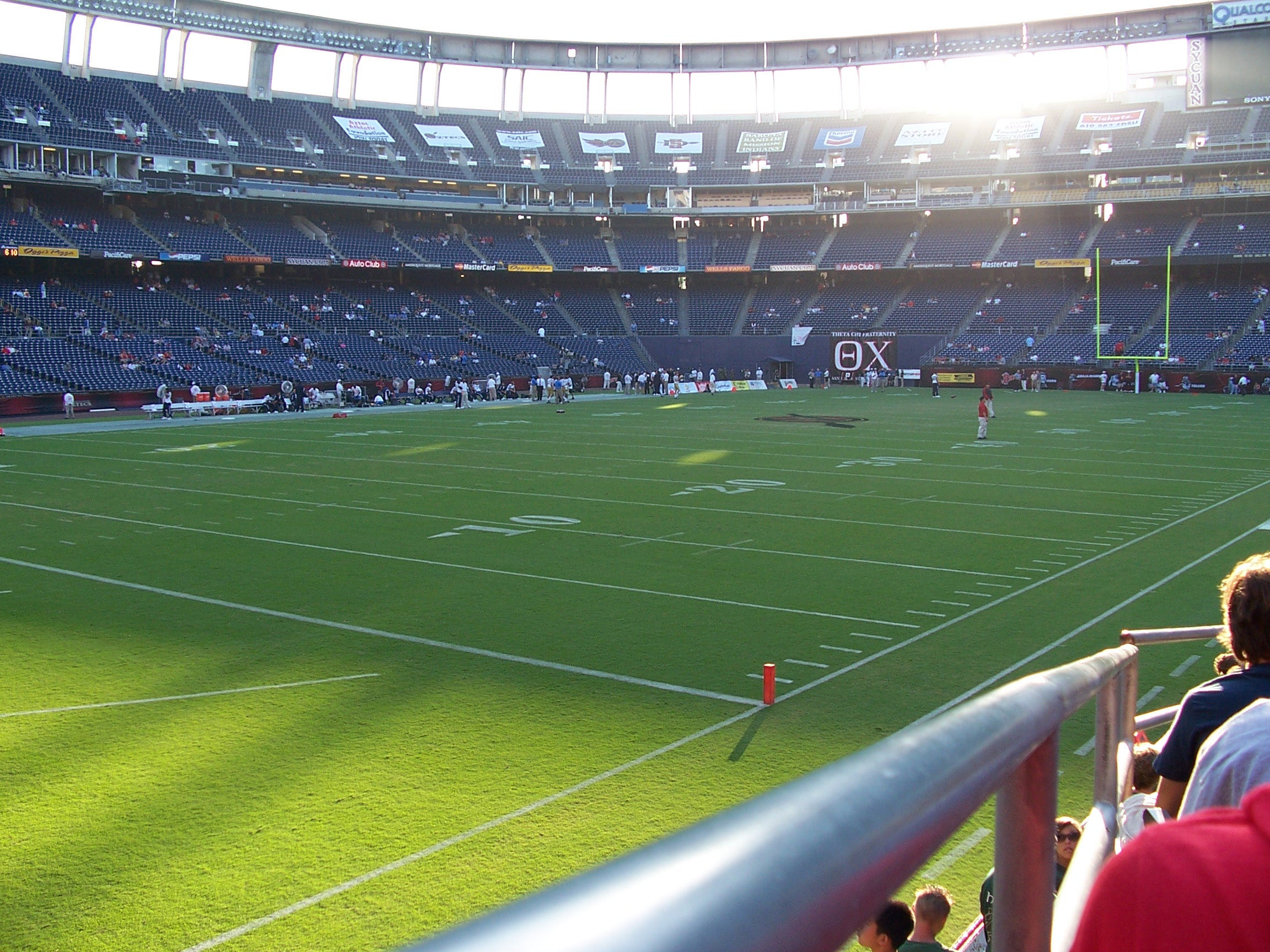
Interior of then-Qualcomm Stadium before a SDSU Aztecs football game

Since its inception, the stadium, which was approximately five miles from campus, had been the home of the San Diego State Aztecs football team through the 2019 season, the final season before demolition of the stadium commenced. Before the building of the stadium, they had played their games at Balboa Stadium and their on-campus stadium, Aztec Bowl (which is now the site of Viejas Arena, the home of the university's basketball teams). Traditionally, the team, clad in all-black uniforms and red helmets, has played its home games at night, a tradition started during the days of former head coach Don Coryell before the stadium was even opened. There have been attempts in the past to change from "The Look", but all have been associated with subsequent poor play by the Aztecs and a return to the traditional look.

== Other football games ==
Following the 1978 college football season, the stadium began hosting the Holiday Bowl, an annual bowl game held before New Year's Day. It originally hosted the Western Athletic Conference champion (at the time, the hometown Aztecs had just joined this conference) against a nationally ranked opponent. The game has traditionally been a high-scoring affair, and until the 2006 edition no team had ever been held to ten points or less. From 1995 through 2004, every losing team scored at least 20 points. The 1984 game is well known for being the culmination of BYU's championship season, the last Division I-A (now FBS) national championship not won by a member of a Power Five conference or a major independent program.

On December 22, 2005, a second bowl game came to San Diego when the inaugural Poinsettia Bowl was played at the stadium, with Navy beating Colorado State. The Poinsettia Bowl was organized by the same organizing committee as the Holiday Bowl. It was officially discontinued after the 2016 game, as the organizing committee announced (in January 2017) that it had decided to host only one game, beginning with the 2017 season.

On October 27, 2018, the Navy Midshipmen hosted the Notre Dame Fighting Irish at the stadium for a regular season game.

The stadium was the home field for the San Diego Fleet of the AAF. They played 4 home games at the then named SDCCU Stadium in February and March 2019, with a home record of 3–1, before the league folded following week 8 of the inaugural season.

CIF San Diego Section Finals for high school football were held at the stadium. These usually took place on a Friday in early December, and four games were played (with eight teams representing four separate divisions, which are determined by the enrollment sizes of the individual schools).

== Soccer ==
The stadium was a venue for many international soccer matches. The stadium hosted FIFA tournaments, including the CONCACAF Gold Cup, and the U.S. Cup (an international invitational), as well as many international friendly matches involving the Mexico national team. The most recent international friendly at the stadium set an all-time attendance record for the sport in the region. The match between Mexico and Argentina which was held on June 4, 2008, drew 68,498 spectators. In addition, the stadium was part of the 18-stadium United States 2018 and 2022 FIFA World Cup bid, but the United States did not win either bid for the World Cup.

The stadium also hosted several international friendlies featuring clubs such as Real Madrid, Chivas, Portsmouth F.C. and Club América.

The San Diego Sockers of the North American Soccer League played at the stadium from 1978 to 1983. The stadium was the venue of Soccer Bowl '82 of the North American Soccer League and Major League Soccer's 1999 All-Star Game.

On January 29, 2017, the USMNT played a friendly (exhibition) match against Serbia, the first ever meeting between the two teams. The match finished as a 0–0 draw.

The stadium hosted two group stage matches of the 2017 CONCACAF Gold Cup.

On July 25, 2018, the stadium hosted a 2018 International Champions Cup match between A.S. Roma and Tottenham Hotspur. Tottenham Hotspur won 4–1.

In 2019, the stadium hosted matches of National Independent Soccer Association club San Diego 1904 FC.

== Other sports ==
In October 1967, just weeks after the stadium opened, it hosted a Sports Car Club of America event organized by San Diego Region. The event was not held in the stadium itself, but on a temporary course mapped out through the stadium's parking lot. In July 1968, the Region organized a SCCA National for the car park, now called the San Diego Stadium International Raceway, but the combination of a very small crowd and complaints about the noise ensured that the experiment was not repeated.

The stadium also hosted rugby matches. In October 1980, the United States played New Zealand in a rugby match televised on ESPN. With 14,000 fans in attendance, this game at the time was the largest crowd ever to watch an international rugby game in the US. Old Mission Beach Athletic Club RFC played rugby union at the adjacent mini-stadium, so-called Little Q.

The stadium was home to a round of the AMA Supercross Championship each year, usually in early February, from 1980 to 2014. The stadium also hosted a round of Monster Jam, also ran and operated by Feld Entertainment. In 2015, both events were moved to Petco Park.

ESPN held their inaugural Moto X World Championships at the stadium in April 2008, and has previously used the stadium parking lot and surrounding streets as a venue in the X Games Street Luge competition.

On May 4 and 18, 2013, the stadium was used as a racecourse by the Stadium Super Trucks.

== Concerts on the Green ==
Concerts on the Green was a sports field converted into a music and entertainment venue, located on the southwest corner of the stadium parking lot. The field was originally used as a practice venue for the San Diego Chargers. After the team moved to Chargers Park about a mile north of the stadium, the area was used primarily for rugby. AEG leased the area and retrofit it into an open-air amphitheater for concerts and other entertainment shows. The venue had the capability to hold 12,500, making it the second biggest entertainment venue in the Greater San Diego area; only North Island Credit Union Amphitheatre seated more.

== Non-sporting events ==
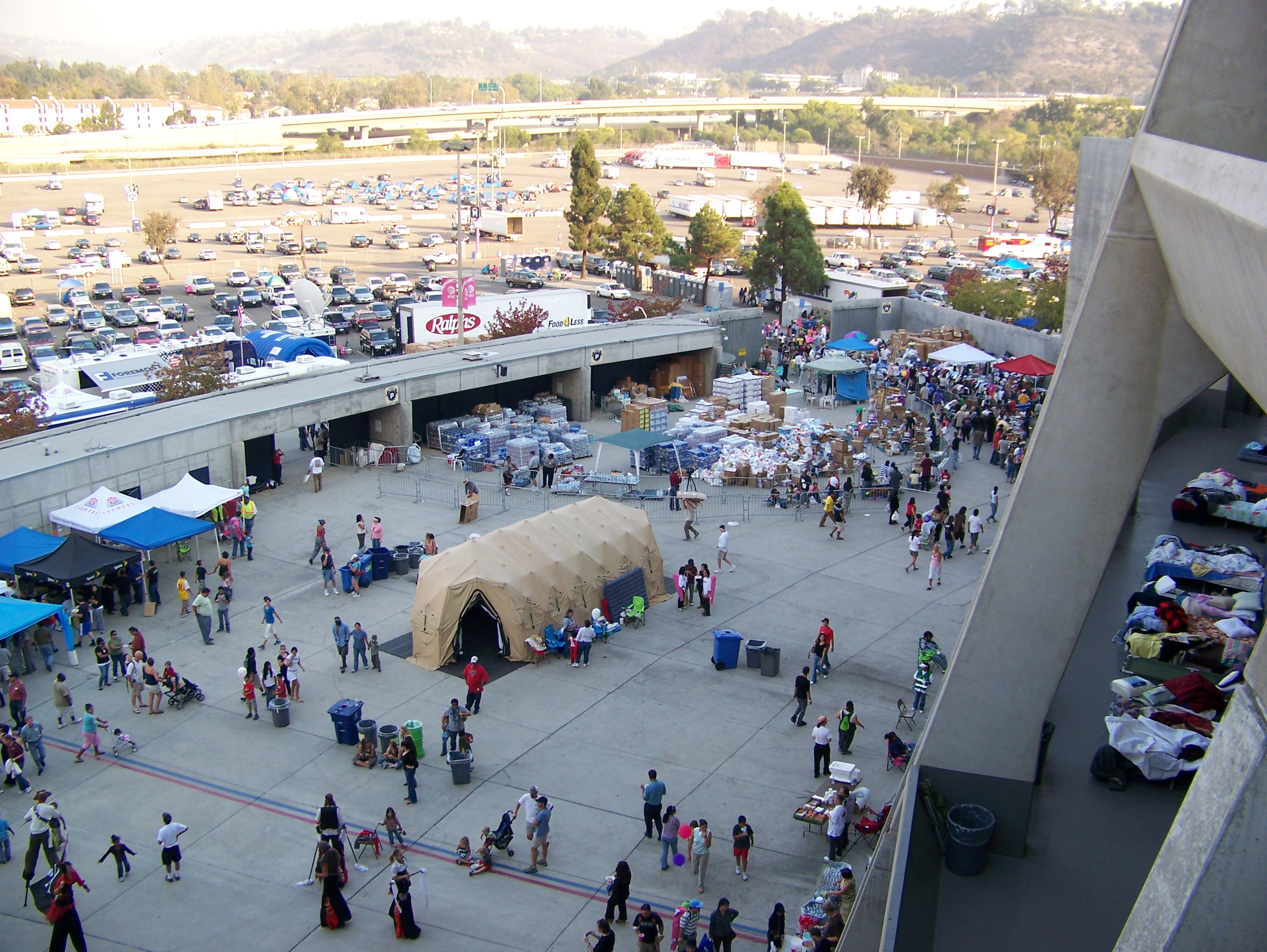
The stadium being used as an evacuation center during California wildfires of October 2007.

=== Concerts ===
Many concerts were also held inside the stadium over the years, by artists of many different genres.

| Date | Artist | Opening act(s) | Tour / Concert name | Attendance | Revenue | Notes |
|---|---|---|---|---|---|---|
| August 9, 1976 | ZZ Top | Blue Öyster Cult; Johnny & Edgar Winter | Worldwide Texas Tour | — | — | |
| July 5, 1981 | Heart | Jimmy Buffett; Pat Travers; Loverboy; Cold Chisel | Bébé le Strange Tour | | | |
| October 7, 1981 | The Rolling Stones | George Thorogood; J. Geils Band | American Tour 1981 | 70,000 / 70,000 | $1,050,000 | |
| May 8, 1982 | Cheap Trick | Joan Jett; Chuck Berry | KGB 101.5 FM Sky Show VII | | | |
| October 27, 1982 | The Who | John Mellencamp; Loverboy | The Who Tour 1982 | 51,771 / 55,000 | $776,565 | |
| September 17, 1983 | Def Leppard | Mötley Crüe; Eddie Money; Uriah Heep | KGB 101.5 FM Sky Show VIII | | | |
| August 22, 1989 | The Who | — | The Who Tour 1989 | 40,101 / 46,500 | $902,273 | This concert was recorded for the live album, Join Together. |
| September 30, 1992 | Guns N' Roses; Metallica | Body Count | Guns N' Roses/Metallica Stadium Tour | 42,167 / 45,938 | $1,159,593 | |
| November 10, 1992 | U2 | — | Zoo TV Tour | — | — | |
| April 14, 1994 | Pink Floyd | | The Division Bell Tour | 51,610 / 51,610 | $1,594,069 | |
| June 4, 1994 | Eagles | — | Hell Freezes Over | — | — | |
| October 17, 1994 | The Rolling Stones | Seal | Voodoo Lounge Tour | — | — | |
| March 22, 1995 | Billy Joel; Elton John | — | Face to Face 1995 | 52,665 / 52,665 | $2,350,025 | |
| April 28, 1997 | U2 | — | PopMart Tour | — | — | |
| February 3, 1998 | The Rolling Stones | Santana | Bridges to Babylon Tour | 55,507 / 55,507 | $3,220,069 | |
| July 16, 2001 | *NSYNC | Eden's Crush; Samantha Mumba; Dante Thomas | PopOdyssey | 38,304 / 57,555 | $1,983,015 | |
| July 27, 2008 | Stone Temple Pilots | Black Rebel Motorcycle Club; Wolfmother | 2008 Reunion Tour | — | — | |
| September 6, 2008 | Bob Dylan | — | Never Ending Tour 2008 | — | — | This concert was a part of "Concerts on the Green". |
| July 9, 2015 | One Direction | Icona Pop | On the Road Again Tour | 52,510 / 52,510 | $4,353,534 | "Spaces" was performed and "Act My Age" was added to the setlist. |
| May 12, 2016 | Beyoncé | DJ Khaled | The Formation World Tour | 45,885 / 45,885 | $6,028,115 | |
| August 22, 2016 | Guns N' Roses | The Cult | Not in This Lifetime... Tour | 49,458 / 49,458 | $5,337,634 | |
| September 22, 2017 | U2 | Beck | The Joshua Tree Tour 2017 | 54,221 / 54,221 | $6,469,130 | |
| October 8, 2017 | Coldplay | Tove Lo; Alina Baraz | A Head Full of Dreams Tour | 54,279 / 54,279 | $5,955,986 | Part of the show was broadcast live at a benefit concert in Mexico City for the relief efforts for the Central Mexico earthquake. The proceeds from the show went towards the relief efforts for the Central Mexico earthquake. |
| September 27, 2018 | Beyoncé; Jay-Z | Chloe X Halle and DJ Khaled | On the Run II Tour | 42,953 / 42,953 | $5,445,486 | |

=== In TV and movies ===
American Idol (season 7) held auditions there in July 2007; a total of 30 people who auditioned there made it to the next round.

In a January 30, 2009, episode of Monk, The stadium was known as Summit Stadium in the episode Mr. Monk Makes the Playoffs with the fictitious San Francisco Condors as the home team.

Many parts of the 1979 film The Kid from Left Field were filmed in and around the stadium.

The ending to the 1978 film Attack of the Killer Tomatoes was filmed on the field, using locals as extras.

=== The Little Q ===
The Little Q was a sports field, used primarily for rugby located adjacent to the stadium; the Little Q was home to San Diego's Super League rugby team OMBAC and the College Premier Division San Diego State University Aztec rugby team.

=== Big SoCal Euro ===
Big SoCal Euro was a gathering of European car enthusiasts. It attracts over 3,000 car lovers every year. Not only is Big SoCal Euro one of the largest all European car gatherings, but it is also one of the oldest events of its kind, established in 2002. It had been held at the stadium since 2007. The event was founded by Lon Mok of SoCalEuro.com

=== Other events ===
Billy Graham hosted a crusade at the stadium in early May 2003.

During the Cedar Fire in October 2003 and the October 2007 California wildfires, the stadium served as an evacuation site for those living in affected areas. (This was similar to the use of the Houston Astrodome and the New Orleans Superdome during Hurricane Katrina.) The Cedar Fire forced the Chargers to move a contest with the Miami Dolphins to Arizona State University's Sun Devil Stadium in Tempe, Arizona.

In the 1980s and early 1990s, the San Diego County Council of the Boy Scouts of America used the stadium's concourse areas (between the rear of the grandstands and the freestanding wall which contains the entrance gates) as well as portions of the parking lots as the site of its annual Scout Fair. The San Diego County Council has since merged with the council representing Imperial County to form the Desert Pacific Council.

== Sale and demolition ==
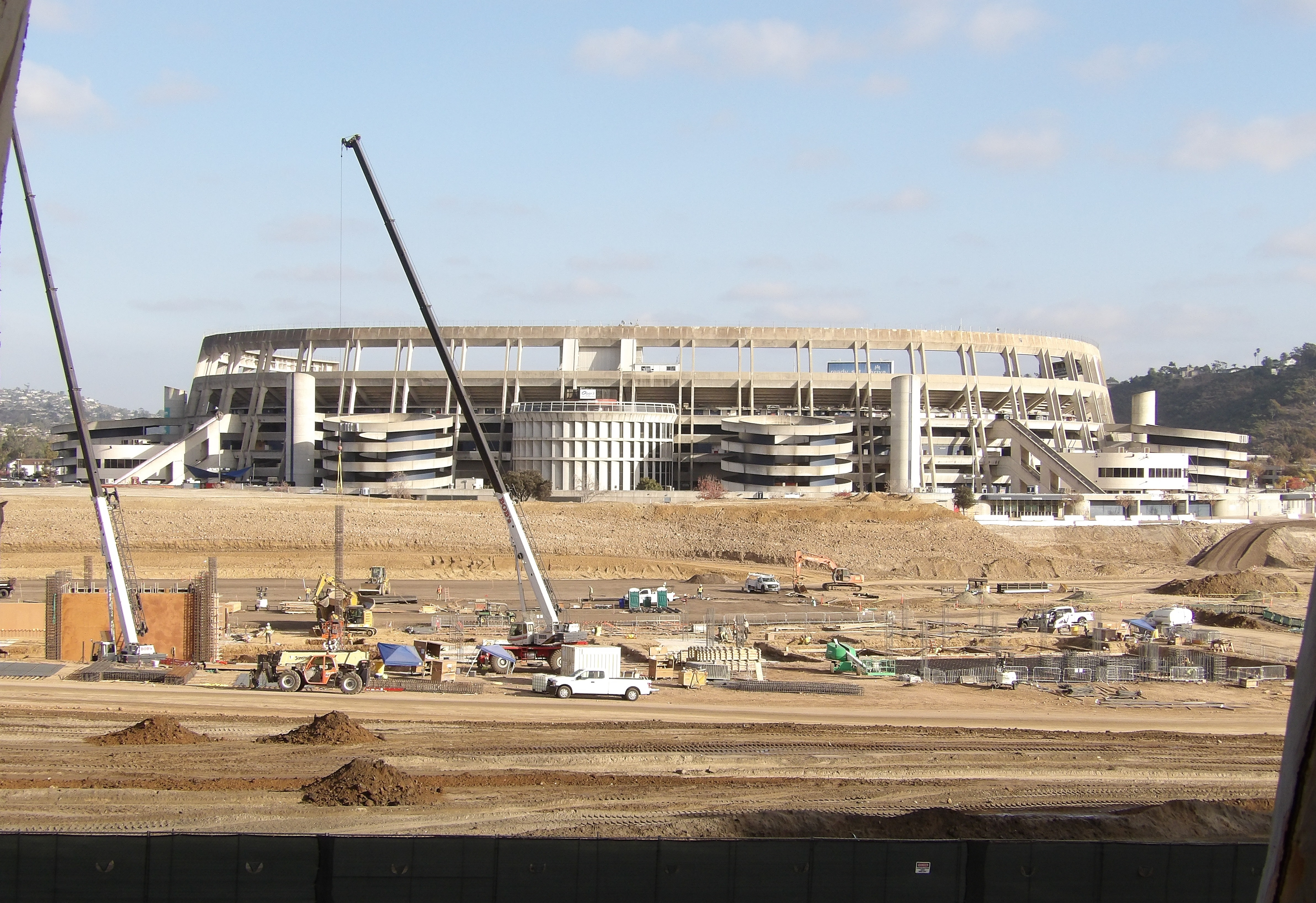
The stadium under demolition December 10, 2020

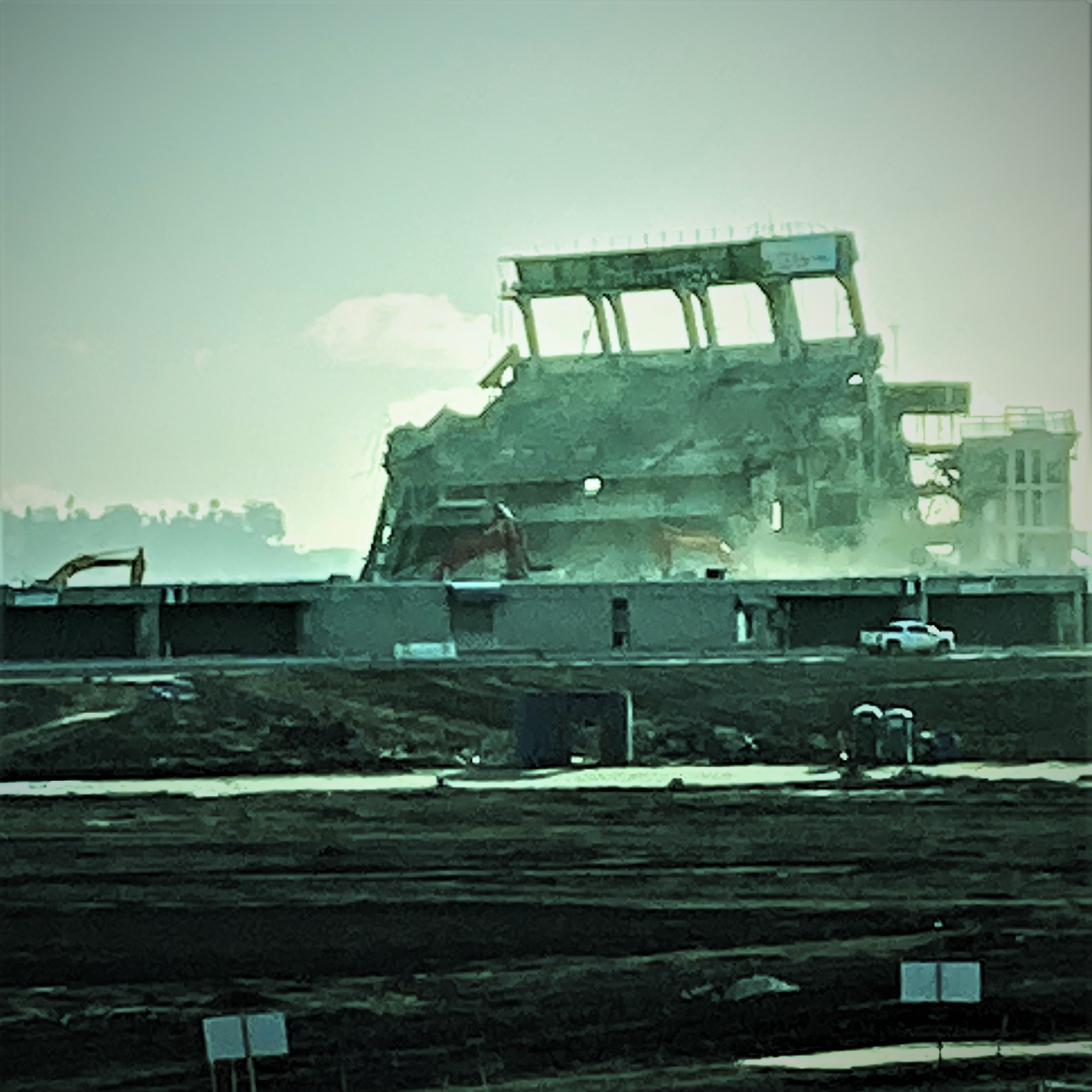
San Diego Stadium's demolition as of March 10, 2021

On June 30, 2020, the City of San Diego approved the sale of the stadium to San Diego State University (SDSU) and on August 10, 2020, the university officially took control. A new stadium broke ground on the site one week later and ultimately opened in 2022 as Snapdragon Stadium, with a seating capacity of 35,000 to support events including SDSU football, non-football NCAA championship games, professional soccer, a possible future NFL team, and special events such as concerts. Following failed efforts in 2010 and 2016 to build a new stadium in downtown San Diego's East Village, SDSU bought the entire 135 acres (55 ha), including the existing stadium, from the city for $88 million. A competing redevelopment proposal, known as SoccerCity, envisioned that stadium site could be leased from the city and redeveloped with private funding if San Diego was awarded a Major League Soccer team. The SoccerCity proposal was placed on the November 2018 ballot alongside the SDSU proposal but was defeated. The entire $3.5 billion SDSU project includes housing, office, and retail space, hotels, and 80 acres of parks and open space including a 34-acre river park on city property and will be rolled out in phases over 8–10 years.

The stadium was scheduled to be decommissioned following the end of the 2021 college football season while Snapdragon Stadium was being constructed on the existing parking lot. However, on September 15, 2020, San Diego State University announced that the stadium would be demolished in early 2021. The stadium was taken down in pieces starting in December 2020 rather than being imploded due to the California environmental law. The 2020 and 2021 seasons were played at Dignity Health Sports Park in Carson until Snapdragon Stadium's completion for the 2022 season.

On March 22, 2021, the last freestanding section of San Diego Stadium visible from Interstates 8 and 15 was felled, leaving the plaza level to be demolished.

== See also ==
- List of NCAA Division I FBS football stadiums

Events and tenants
| Preceded by Balboa Stadium | Home of the San Diego Chargers; 1967–2017 | Succeeded by StubHub Center |
| Preceded by First | Home of the Holiday Bowl; 1978–2019 | Succeeded by Petco Park |
| Preceded by First | Home of the Poinsettia Bowl; 2005–2016 | Succeeded by None |
| Preceded by First | Home of the San Diego Padres; 1969–2003 | Succeeded by Petco Park |
| Preceded by Yankee Stadium; SkyDome | Host of the All-Star Game; 1978; 1992 | Succeeded by The Kingdome; Camden Yards |
| Preceded by Rose Bowl; Louisiana Superdome; Louisiana Superdome | Host of the Super Bowl; XXII 1988; XXXII 1998; XXXVII 2003 | Succeeded by Joe Robbie Stadium; Pro Player Stadium; Reliant Stadium |
| Preceded by Three Rivers Stadium | Host of AFC Championship Game; 1981 | Succeeded by Riverfront Stadium |
