= Multi-purpose stadium =

Stadium designed for multifunctionality over specificity

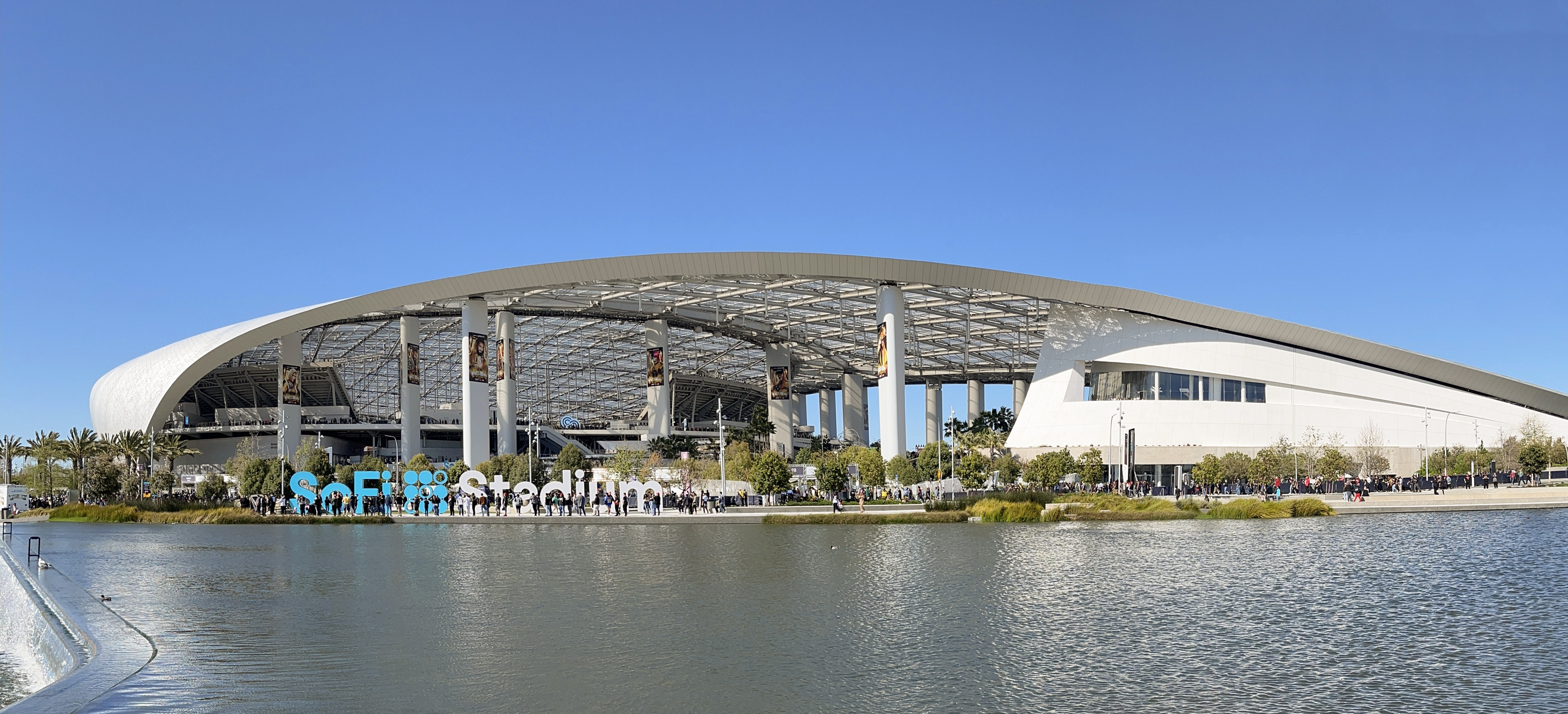
SoFi Stadium, a multipurpose stadium in Los Angeles, California

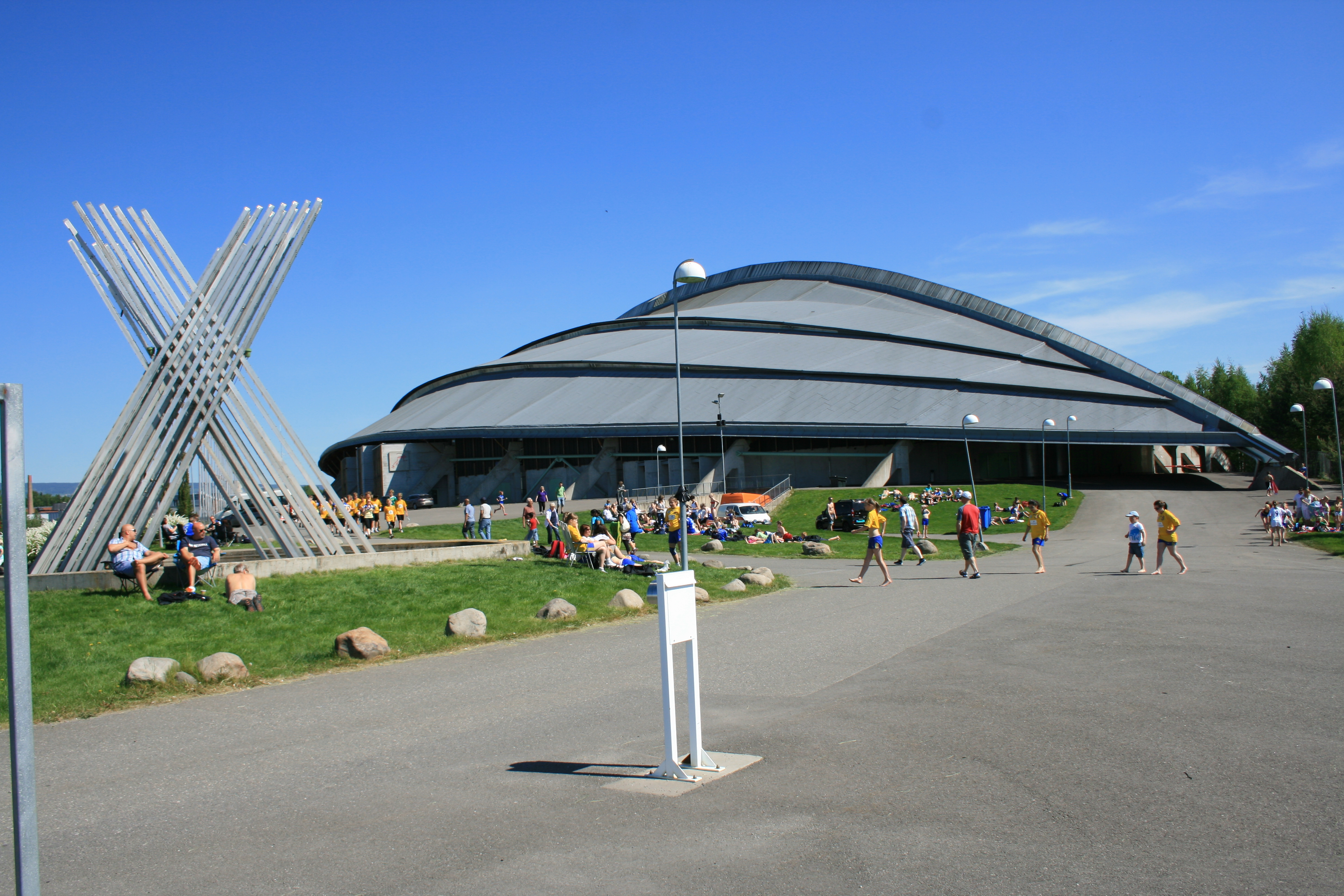
Vikingskipet in Norway is a multi-purpose stadium for ice sports.

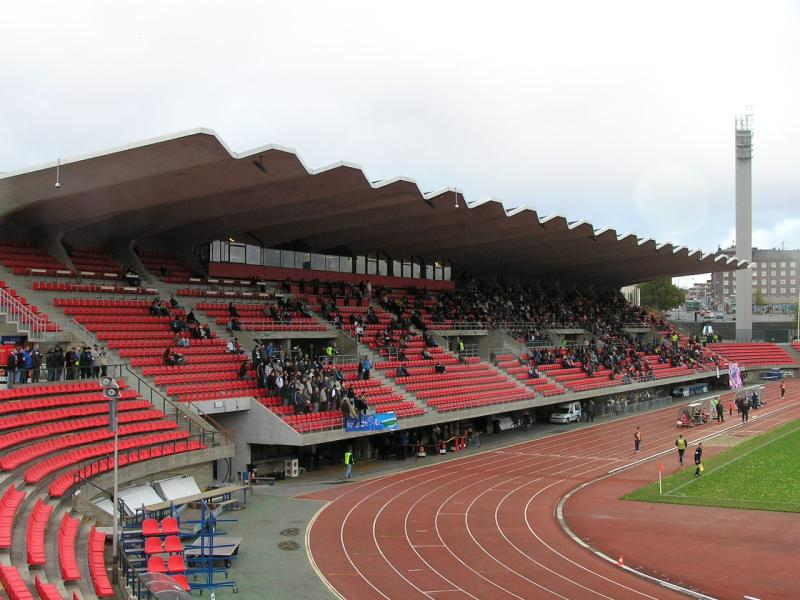
Ratina Stadium in Tampere, Finland

A multi-purpose stadium is a type of stadium designed to be easily used for multiple types of events. While any stadium could potentially host more than one type of sport or event, this concept usually refers to a design philosophy that stresses multifunctionality over speciality. It is used most commonly in Canada and the United States, where the two most popular outdoor team sports—Canadian football or American football and baseball—require radically different facilities. Football uses a rectangular field, while baseball is played on a diamond with a large outfield. Since Canadian football fields are larger than American ones, the design specifications for Canadian facilities are somewhat less demanding. The particular design to accommodate both is usually an oval, although some later designs use an octorad. While building stadiums in this manner allows sports teams and governments to share costs, it also presents some challenges.

In North America, multipurpose stadiums were primarily built during the 1960s and 1970s as shared home stadiums for Major League Baseball and National Football League or Canadian Football League teams. Some stadiums were renovated to allow multipurpose configurations during the 1980s. This type of stadium is associated with an era of suburbanization, in which many sports teams followed their fans out of large cities into areas with cheaper, more plentiful land. They were usually built near highways and had large parking lots, but were rarely connected to public transit. As multipurpose stadiums were rarely ideal for both sports usually housed in them, they had fallen out of favor by the 1990s, with the SkyDome (in Canada) that opened in 1989 being the last such stadium completed to accommodate baseball and football. With the completion of the Truman Sports Complex in Kansas City in 1973, a model for purpose-built stadiums was laid down. Since the Baltimore Orioles left the multi-purpose Memorial Stadium for the baseball-only Oriole Park at Camden Yards in 1992, most major league sports stadiums have been built specifically for one sport. However, some newer NFL stadiums (e.g. Seattle, Atlanta, Charlotte) have been built with consideration for the possible use of the stadium for Major League Soccer or international soccer, which has similar field dimensions to American football. Fields that are suitable for soccer are almost always equally suitable for either rugby code (rugby union or rugby league), and the 2031 Men's Rugby World Cup is expected to employ the same stadiums as the NFL and MLS.

Outside North America, the term is rarely used, since association football (i.e., soccer) is the only major outdoor team sport in many countries; in many other countries, association football and rugby can easily coexist with limited venue conversion required beyond goalpost changes and line markings. In Australia, many sports grounds are suited to both Australian rules football and cricket, as Australian Rules fields and laws are laid out on cricket ovals. In some cases, such as at Stadium Australia in Sydney, Docklands Stadium in Melbourne, and National Stadium, in Singapore, stadiums are designed to be converted between the oval configuration for cricket and Australian rules football and a rectangular configuration for rugby and association football, and in the case of Singapore's National Stadium, an athletics configuration as well. Association football stadiums have historically served as track and field arenas, too, and some (like the Olympiastadion in Berlin) still do, whereas a newer generation frequently has no running track, in order to allow the fans closer to the field. This has created some difficulties with creating large athletics venues for major championships, as fans are less willing to accept the compromises required in the design of such stadiums, an issue that has bedevilled, e.g. the London Stadium since the 2012 Summer Olympics and was avoided in the commonwealth Games stadium of 2014 by returning the stadiums to football-only use, and in 2022 by having the national athletics body as the sole primary tenant of a renovated stadium.

Winter sports facilities, especially speed skating rinks, can be multi-purpose stadiums. Very often, a rink or two of approximately 61 by 30 meters—the regulation size of an IIHF ice hockey rink—are placed inside the oval. Sometimes the ice surface is even larger, allowing for both bandy and curling.

In Ireland, the first of two national stadiums, Aviva Stadium, is shared by football and rugby union, although only rugby union has a club team, Leinster Rugby, that regularly uses the facility. The other larger national stadium, Croke Park, hosts three different sports regularly: gaelic football, hurling, and its women's equivalent, camogie. All three are gaelic games run by the same organisation, the Gaelic Athletic Association (GAA), and the rules of each game are mapped onto the same dimensions—although some pitches in areas where hurling is the dominant code have longer pitches slightly more suited to faster, longer passes in the hurling game. When the Aviva was being rebuilt, Croke Park stepped in as home for the national teams in both soccer and rugby union, a decision of significant political weight in the nation's history. Gaelic grounds can easily accommodate both as the typical Gaelic pitch, while similarly rectangular, is significantly longer and wider than the fields used for soccer and rugby union, which are almost identical in dimensions. Historically, however, the GAA has been reluctant to allow 'foreign' sports to use its facilities, although these objections were set aside both for the rebuild of the Aviva and for the ultimately unsuccessful 2023 Rugby World Cup bid. Croke Park and Aviva have both occasionally hosted visiting American football college matches, especially those featuring the Army and Navy, or Notre Dame, with which Ireland has a long-standing connection.

== North America ==
=== United States ===
Several stadiums hosted multiple sports teams before the advent of multi-purpose stadiums.

In New York City, the Polo Grounds hosted football teams early on, as its rectangular nature lent itself well to football and was also used for baseball. The original Yankee Stadium was designed to accommodate football, as well as track and field (Yankee Stadium popularized the warning track, originally designed as a running track around baseball fields), in addition to its primary use for baseball.

In addition to baseball, Fenway Park and Braves Field would host college football and several professional football teams (all of whom relocated within a few years). Wrigley Field, while originally built for baseball, also hosted the Chicago Bears, Comiskey Park hosted the Chicago Cardinals, and Tiger Stadium hosted the Detroit Lions. Later venues such as Cleveland Stadium, Milwaukee County Stadium and Baltimore Memorial Stadium were all built to accommodate both baseball and football.

In 1920s New England, outdoor wood-track velodromes such as the East Hartford Velodrome and Providence's Cycledrome could, with some compromises, fit an American football field in their infields: early NFL franchises in each city (the Hartford Blues and Providence Steam Roller, respectively) used the velodromes as their home stadiums.

In the 1960s, multipurpose stadiums began replacing their baseball-only and football-only predecessors, now known as "classics" or "jewel box" parks. The advantage of a multi-purpose stadium is that a singular infrastructure and piece of real estate can support both teams in terms of transportation and playing area, while money (often public funds) that would have been spent to support infrastructure for two stadiums can be spent elsewhere.

Also playing into the advent of the multipurpose stadium was Americans' growing use of automobiles, which required professional sports stadiums surrounded by parking: most cities lacked affordable space for such stadiums near their city centers, so multi-purpose stadiums were typically built farther from the city center with freeway access.

Subsets of the multipurpose stadiums were the so-called "cookie-cutter stadiums" or "concrete donuts" which were all very similar in design. They featured a completely circular or nearly circular design and accommodated both baseball and football by rotating sections of the box seat areas to fit the respective playing fields. These fields often used artificial turf, as it could withstand the reconfiguration process more easily, or be removed for non-sporting events. Furthermore, many of these stadiums were either enclosed domes (where natural grass could not grow without sunlight) or located in cold-weather cities (where undersoil heating was expensive and unreliable) and before the development of hybrid grass and improved natural grass cultivation techniques, artificial turf was the best solution at the time.

The first of these "cookie-cutter" or "concrete donut" stadiums was Robert F. Kennedy Memorial Stadium in 1961 (then known as District of Columbia Stadium); it was followed during the 1960s and 1970s by Shea Stadium in 1964, Atlanta–Fulton County Stadium and the Astrodome in 1965, Busch Memorial Stadium and Oakland Coliseum in 1966, San Diego Stadium in 1967, Riverfront Stadium and Three Rivers Stadium in 1970, Veterans Stadium in 1971, and the Kingdome in 1976.

Nine of these eleven stadiums have been since demolished, with Atlanta–Fulton County Stadium demolished in 1997, the Kingdome in 2000, Three Rivers Stadium in 2001, Riverfront Stadium in 2002, Veterans Stadium in 2004, Busch Memorial Stadium in 2005, Shea Stadium in 2009, San Diego Stadium in 2021, and RFK Stadium in 2026. Furthermore, the Astrodome has been vacant since 2008 due to its failure to meet current fire and building code requirements. The Oakland Coliseum was the last multi-purpose stadium to remain in continuous dual use until the fall of 2019 with the Athletics and the Raiders sharing the facility. This ended when the Raiders franchise relocated to Las Vegas in 2020. The A's continued to use the Coliseum through the 2024 season. Having announced their own intentions of moving to Las Vegas the previous year, the Athletics vacated Oakland and currently play in Sacramento.

The Hubert H. Humphrey Metrodome was unusual as one of the few air-supported dome stadiums that was multipurpose in practice, being convertible between football and baseball. Home of the Minnesota Vikings through the 2013 season, it was also home to the Minnesota Twins until 2009 and the Minnesota Golden Gophers football team (NCAA) until 2008 as well as the Minnesota Golden Gophers baseball team (NCAA) until 2012. The Metrodome has been demolished, with U.S. Bank Stadium, built mainly for professional football but able to convert to a college baseball stadium, now sitting on its former site. Most other inflatable domes, such as the Hoosier Dome and Pontiac Silverdome, were football-only stadiums, although both stadiums hosted basketball; the later-RCA Dome hosted the NCAA Division I men's basketball tournament many times and hosted the Final Four multiple times while the Silverdome was the home arena for the Detroit Pistons for most of the 1980s. The Carrier Dome was another such air-supported, multipurpose stadium; it was built to accommodate outdoor sports such as football and indoor sports such as basketball. The Carrier Dome, since renamed JMA Wireless Dome, remains in use, although its air-supported roof was replaced by a fixed roof in 2020. Air-supported domes fell out of favor in the 21st century after notable weather-related collapses in Minnesota and Pontiac exposed the drawbacks of air-supported domes in snowy locales.

During the height of the multipurpose stadium construction era of the 1960s and 1970s, three baseball-only stadiums were constructed: Candlestick Park (1960), Dodger Stadium (1962), and Royals Stadium (1973; now Kauffman Stadium). Anaheim Stadium (now known as Angel Stadium), although designed primarily for baseball, opened in 1966 with a press box in the upper tier on the third-base line oriented specifically for football, along with space beyond right field for a movable grandstand to accommodate an additional 13,000 fans for a future pro football franchise. This additional grandstand was indeed added to Anaheim Stadium in 1980 to accommodate the Los Angeles Rams' move from the Los Angeles Memorial Coliseum. Anaheim Stadium was renovated to a baseball-only facility in 1997, three years after the Rams' departure for St. Louis. Similarly, Candlestick Park was renovated into a multipurpose stadium in 1970 to accommodate the San Francisco 49ers' move from Kezar Stadium and converted to football-only after the San Francisco Giants moved to their new ballpark in 2000. Candlestick Park was demolished in 2015. Another baseball stadium, Denver's Mile High Stadium, was also renovated with additional seating, including a 4,500-ton, three-tier movable grandstand to accommodate both baseball and football configurations. Mile High Stadium was home to the AFL/NFL Denver Broncos and the MLB Colorado Rockies franchises.

For the 1996 Summer Olympics, the Atlanta Committee for the Olympic Games (ACOG) built the temporary Centennial Olympic Stadium in a way that it could be converted to a new baseball stadium, and ACOG paid for the conversion.

Despite being considered controversial at the time, the International Olympic Committee considered the action innovative, due to the fact that there were no local needs for another stadium with a capacity for more than 70.000, given the existence of the Georgia Dome which was completed in 1992. Furthermore, the Atlanta Braves had already been exploring opportunities for a new venue to replace the outdated Atlanta–Fulton County Stadium. The southwest corner of the Olympic Stadium was built to accommodate the future baseball infield and seating. This is observable in aerial views and plans of the stadium in its Olympic configuration, where the temporary seats are not placed next to the oval running track. The southwest part of the stadium also had four tiers of seats, luxury boxes, a facade facing the street, and a roof, whereas the northern half of the stadium used a simpler two-tiered seating configuration. During reconstruction, the athletics track was removed, and the north half of the stadium was demolished, reducing the capacity to 49,000 when it reopened as Turner Field. Because of the former track area, the field of play, particularly foul territory, although not large by historical standards, was larger than most MLB stadiums of its era. After the 2016 season, the Braves moved to the new SunTrust Park, and Georgia State University purchased Turner Field and surrounding parking lots for a major campus expansion project. As part of this project, Turner Field was reconfigured as Center Parc Stadium, a downsized rectangular stadium that is now home to the university's football team.

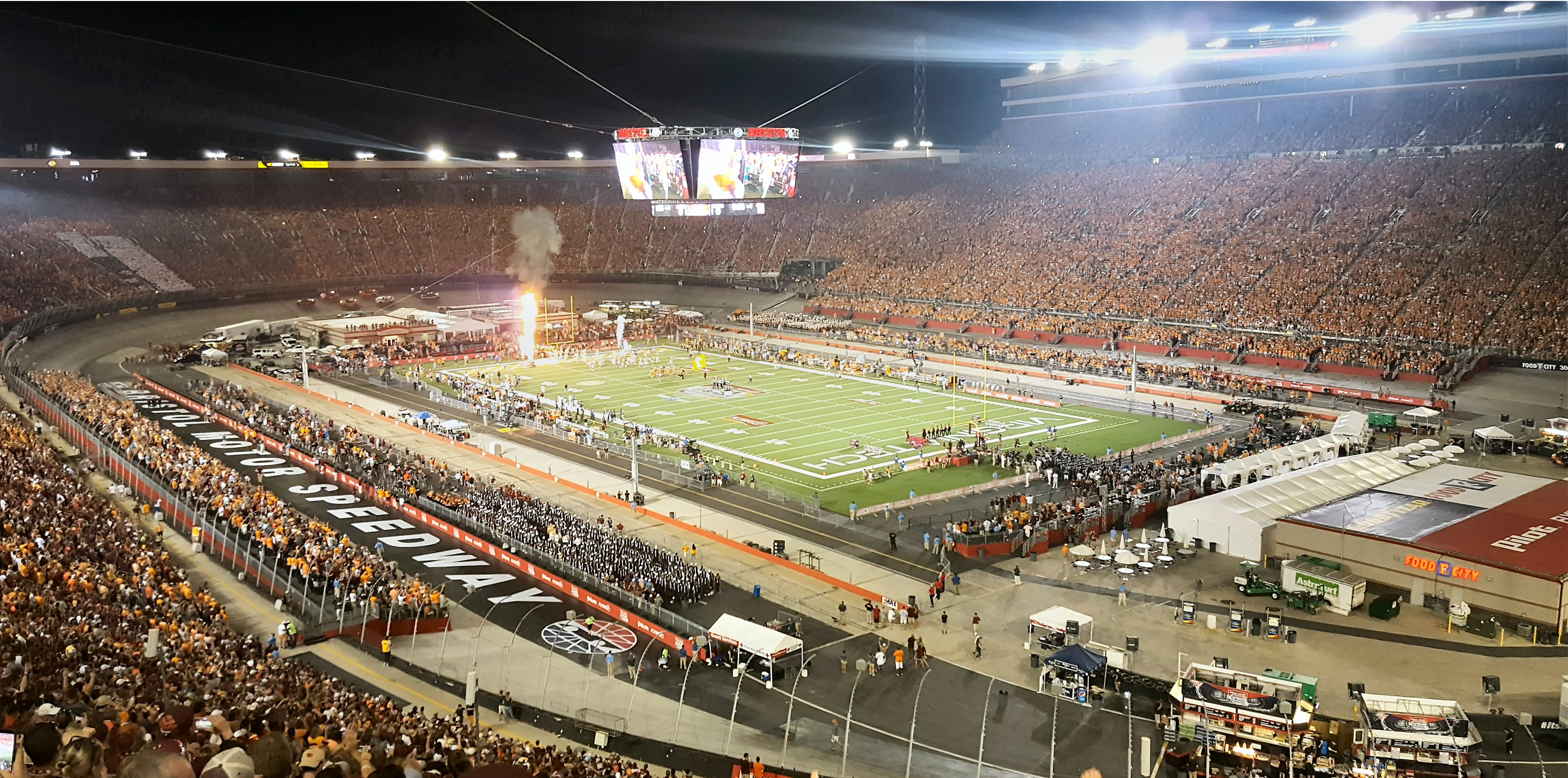
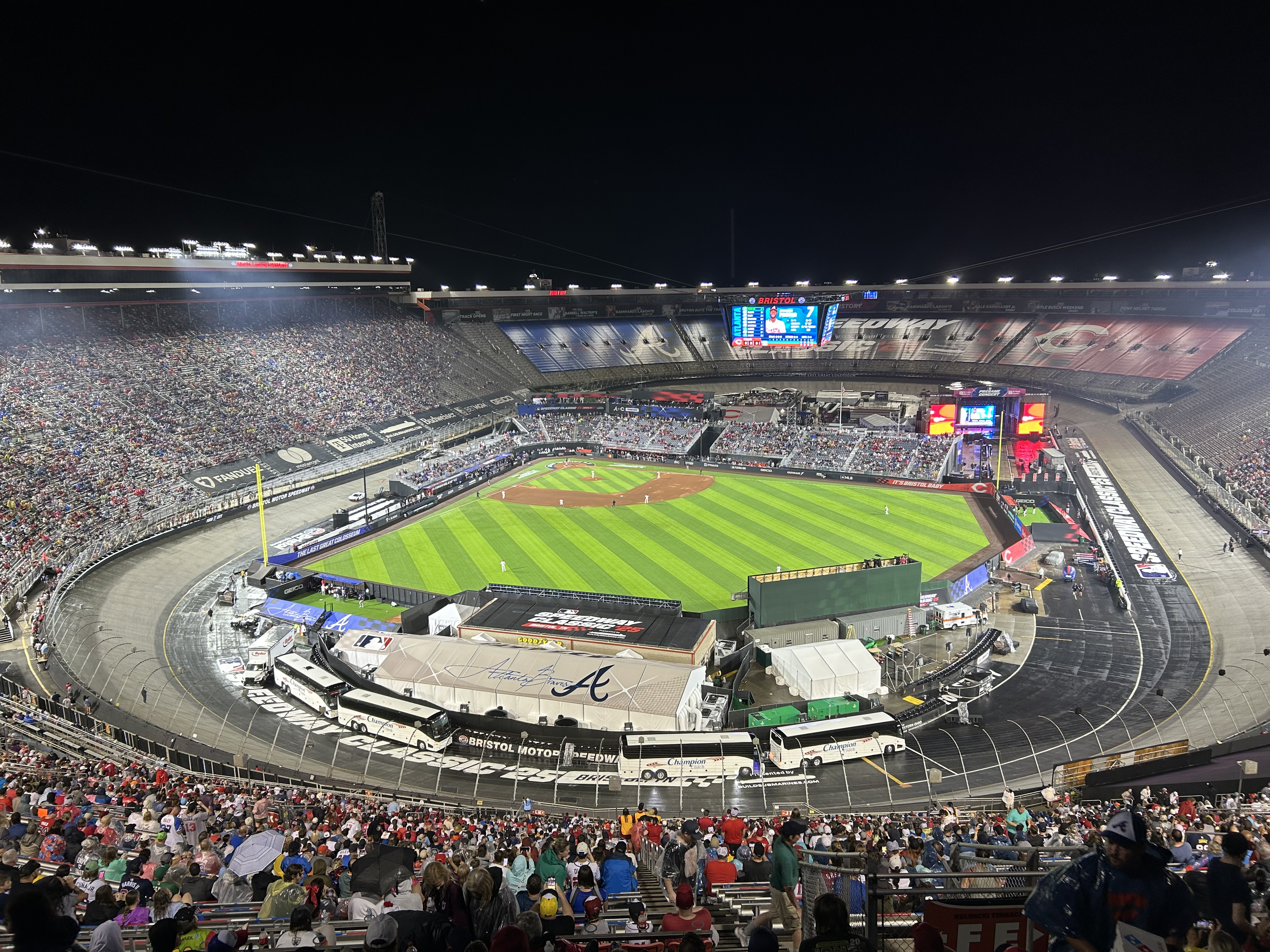
Bristol Motor Speedway when it was temporarily used as american football and baseball fields

=== Canada ===
The first multipurpose stadium in Canada was the Montreal Olympic Stadium, which was built for the 1976 Summer Olympics and initially had functions to host events of different sports and types. However, the project became obsolete over time and the stadium lost its original functions, becoming a "white elephant". The first successful such stadium was the Commonwealth Stadium in Edmonton, which was built for the 1978 Commonwealth Games and the 1983 Summer Universiade. In Canada, several large multisport stadiums were built during this style's heyday. However, unlike in the United States, an NFL team has never been based primarily in Canada (though the Buffalo Bills played some home games in Toronto between 2008 and 2013) and only two MLB teams have been based there. So, teams from these leagues have not been the major impetus behind stadium construction (with the notable exception of Toronto). Instead, stadiums were built primarily for Canadian Football League (CFL) teams and to host multiple-sport events, such as the Winter Olympics, Commonwealth Games, and Pan American Games.

Three of Canada's largest stadiums from this era and type feature domed or retractable roofs: namely BC Place in Vancouver, SkyDome/Rogers Centre in Toronto, and Olympic Stadium in Montreal. BC Place is capable of hosting baseball but has been primarily a football venue. Rogers Centre was primarily built to accommodate baseball (MLB's Toronto Blue Jays play there), but was also a football venue until the CFL's Toronto Argonauts moved to BMO Field after the 2015 CFL season. Since the Argonauts' departure, Rogers Centre has been progressively remodeled and is now considered a baseball-only facility. Montreal's Olympic Stadium was built primarily for a multisport event (the 1976 Summer Olympics), during which it hosted the athletics, equestrian, football. Latterly, it hosted professional team sports: it became the home of the Montreal Alouettes football team and the Montreal Expos baseball team, and began serving as an alternate home to the Montreal Impact when that team entered Major League Soccer in 2012. Similarly, the open-air Commonwealth Stadium in Edmonton was constructed for the 1978 Commonwealth Games and the 1983 Summer Universiade but has also become home to the Edmonton Elks of the CFL. It has also hosted many association football events, as well as the 2003 Heritage Classic, the first major outdoor ice hockey event in Canada. Tim Hortons Field, which opened in 2014, was built both as a venue for the 2015 Pan American Games and as the new home of the Hamilton Tiger-Cats football team; its predecessor, Ivor Wynne Stadium, was originally built for the first Commonwealth Games.

Other Canadian cities never expressed interest in building a venue for Major League Baseball or the Summer Olympics and felt no need to replace their smaller, open-air stadiums used mostly for Canadian football. For example, Calgary's open-air McMahon Stadium dates from 1960 and has been used only for Canadian football, and later was chosen to host the 1988 Winter Olympics opening and closing ceremonies, and an outdoor ice hockey event (the 2011 Heritage Classic). Similar situations hold in Ottawa, Winnipeg, Hamilton, and Regina. No large stadiums of any kind are in cities such as Quebec City, London, or Saskatoon, or in Atlantic Canada; in those places, smaller stadiums (less than 13,000 seats) exist, which can be augmented with temporary seating to bring their capacities close to that of the smaller CFL stadiums.

=== Field layout ===
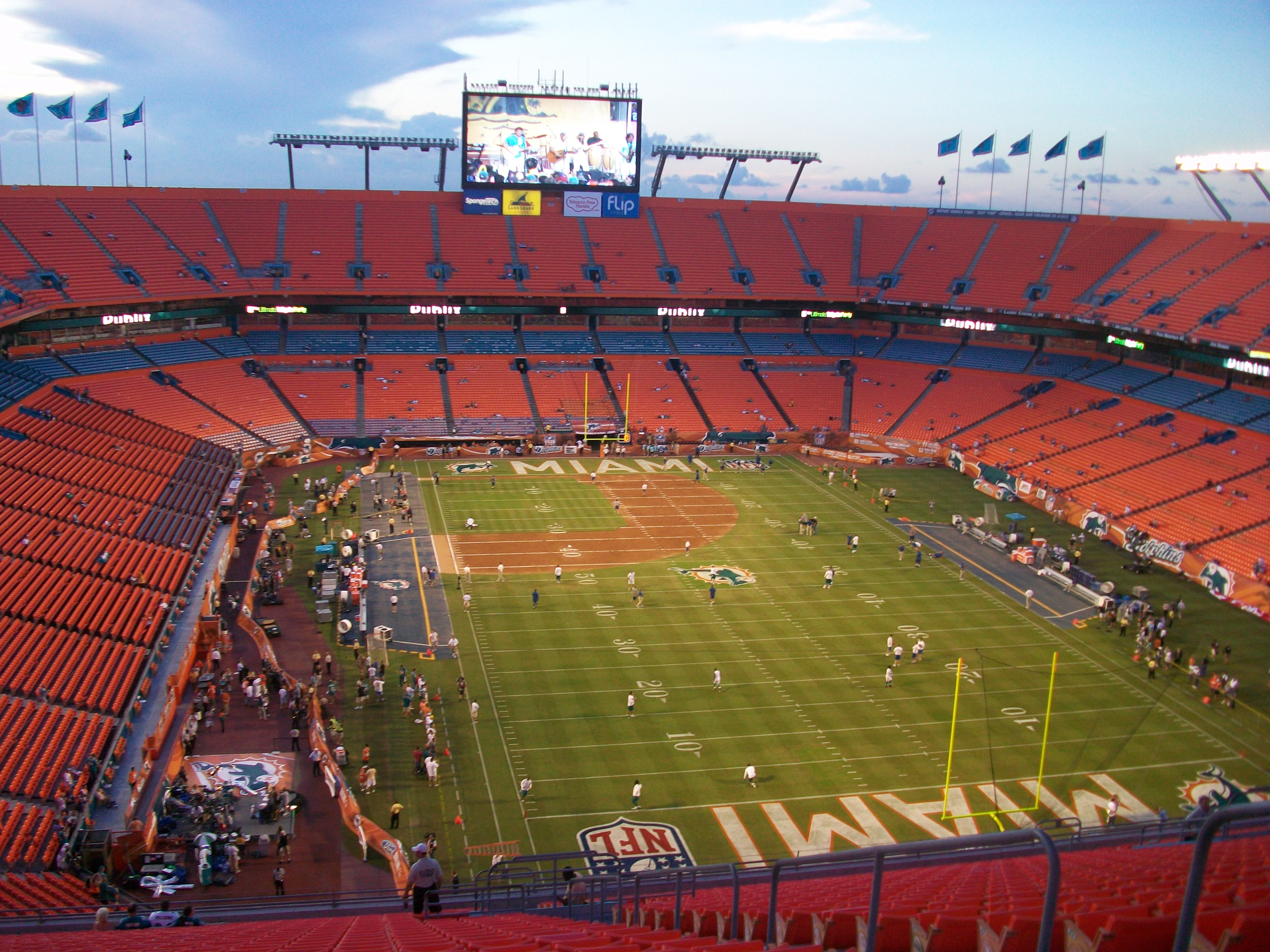
Hard Rock Stadium in Miami Gardens, Florida: Now a football-only stadium, its layout when it was a multi-purpose stadium (pictured here) placed the baseball diamond in the corner of the football field.

Most multipurpose stadiums that existed in North America overlaid one sideline of the football field along one of the baseball foul lines, with one corner of the football field being located where home plate would be. Because the length of a regulation American football field is 360 feet, longer than the roughly 330-foot average for foul lines in Major League Baseball, this requires an unusually long distance from the home plate to the fence along the foul line on which the football field is constructed, part of the football field to be constructed in foul territory (and the size of said territory to be increased accordingly), or a temporary wall. The Oakland Coliseum uses a configuration such that its football sideline runs along a line drawn from first base to third base (the former Atlanta–Fulton County Stadium also used this configuration). This was done presumably to make the same coveted seats behind home plate at a baseball game also coveted 50-yard line seats at a football game, and also so the stadium would need only one press box. Different stadiums have different angles between the left- and right-field seats.

In stadiums that were primarily football stadiums converted to baseball stadiums, the stands were at nearly right angles. This allowed the football field to be squared within the bleachers, but left the baseball configuration with many undesirable views farther away from home plate or facing away from the diamond, such as at the Kingdome, the Hubert H. Humphrey Metrodome, and the venue now known as Hard Rock Stadium. For stadiums such as the Los Angeles Memorial Coliseum, where the Los Angeles Dodgers played their home games from 1958 through 1961 while awaiting completion of Dodger Stadium, this also had the undesirable effect of having unusually short foul lines, making it easier to hit so-called "Chinese home runs". Baseball stadiums that were converted to football stadiums had more of an obtuse angle between the stands. This made the football viewing farther away, and in some cases partially obscured as in Candlestick Park.

In the case of Qualcomm Stadium, it was constructed with half of the field-level seating being permanent (built of concrete, in the southern quadrant of the stadium), and the other half portable (modular construction using aluminum or steel framing). When the stadium was configured for baseball, the portable sections would be placed in the western quadrant of the stadium and serve as the third-base half of the infield. In the football configuration, these would be placed in the northern quadrant of the stadium (covering what is used as left field in the baseball configuration) to allow for the football field to be laid out east–west. This had the advantage of improving sight lines for both sports while keeping the baseball dimensions roughly symmetrical. Qualcomm Stadium's square-circle "octorad" layout was considered an improvement over the other cookie cutter stadiums of the time, and it was the last of the old multi-purpose stadiums to host a Super Bowl (Super Bowl XXXVII).

More-modern multi-purpose stadiums have used more elaborate methods to accommodate multiple sports; Tottenham Hotspur Stadium, for example, uses two sets of turfs, one a movable natural grass surface for soccer, and the other a synthetic turf surface for gridiron. To accommodate the different sight lines preferred for each sport, the soccer surface is positioned several feet above the gridiron, so that the seats are closer to the field in its soccer configuration and elevated above the sidelines and coaches in its gridiron configuration.

== Outside North America ==
The idea of a sharp difference between a multipurpose stadium and a single-sport stadium is less important outside of North America, since in most countries stadiums that are constructed with football in mind are easily able to accommodate rugby, track and field, and other popular sports, which tend to have a similarly sized playing field. For example, any large stadium in most of Latin America, part of Asia, most of Africa, or continental Europe is likely to be used mostly for association football. The majority of the largest stadiums in the world were built for either association football or American football.

The regions where other outdoor sports can draw numbers comparable to association football or American football are limited. They include baseball in Japan and the Spanish Caribbean; cricket in United Kingdom, South Africa, Australia, the Anglophone Caribbean, and the Indian subcontinent; rugby (union or league) in Wales, England, Ireland, South Africa, New Zealand, Fiji, the country of Georgia, and parts of Australia and France; Australian rules football in Australia; bandy in Russia and Scandinavia; and Gaelic games in Ireland.

However, even in these areas, the amount of compromise needed to accommodate multiple sports varies considerably. Most outdoor team sports require a rectangular playing field, but cricket and Australian-rules fields are rounded, while baseball is played on a diamond. This makes them much harder to accommodate within a rectangular-shaped stadium. Likewise, accommodating athletics, such as for a Summer Olympics, means constructing a curved 400-m track around the infield. This often means the sports simply find it easier to be played in separate stadiums.

In the case of Ireland, grounds built for Gaelic games are physically capable of hosting association football and the rugby codes without changing the seating configuration. Because the Gaelic games' pitch is rectangular and also longer and wider than that for football or either rugby code, the only changes required are the physical goals and field markings. However, opposition to those sports within large parts of the Gaelic games community, most notably manifested in GAA Rule 42, means that football and rugby clubs have generally had to play on separate grounds.

True multisport facilities, where teams from a variety of sports use the same stadium as their home ground, exist outside North America in a few cases, most of those as smaller stadiums. A handful are notable for having 60,000 seats or more. The Melbourne Cricket Ground hosts athletics, cricket, Australian rules football, and association football. Accor Stadium hosts cricket and Australian rules football, as well as both rugby codes and association football. Wembley Stadium in London, Stade de France near Paris, and Millennium Stadium in Cardiff are not the permanent homes to any club teams, but are used primarily for international competitions and major tournament finals, mostly for association football and rugby (though Wembley has regularly hosted American football). In South Africa, Soccer City and Ellis Park Stadium have hosted rugby union and football, while Moses Mabhida Stadium has hosted football and cricket. Jawaharlal Nehru Stadium, Kochi, in India hosts cricket and football. Eden Park in New Zealand hosts rugby union and cricket. Sky Stadium in Wellington, New Zealand, has hosted both rugby codes, cricket, association football, and Australian rules football.

Architects from the Arup Group cited history to show that a rarely used athletics track does not work for association football, as these multi-purpose stadiums substantially lengthen the viewing distance for spectators, as compared to football-specific stadiums. Notable unsuccessful past examples, of football matches played within athletics stadiums, include the former Stadio delle Alpi and the Munich Olympic Stadium, with both Juventus and Bayern Munich moving to new stadiums less than 40 years after inheriting them. The delle Alpi's design was criticized for leaving spectators exposed to the elements, and for the long distance between the stands and the pitch resulting in poor visibility. This was because the athletics track, which was seldom used, was constructed around the outside of the pitch, while views from the lower tier were also restricted due to the positioning of advertising boards. These factors contributed to low attendances; only 237 spectators showed up for the Coppa Italia home match against Sampdoria in the 2001–02 season, while in the 2005–06 season, the average attendance was 35,880. Manchester City Council wished to avoid creating a white elephant, so to give the stadium long-term financial viability, extensive work was carried out to convert the City of Manchester Stadium from a track and field arena to a football stadium. The old Estádio da Luz was demolished so that a football-specific replacement could be built on the site as part of Portugal's bid to host Euro 2004. German stadiums such as the AWD-Arena, Commerzbank-Arena, MHPArena, RheinEnergieStadion, AOL Arena, and Zentralstadion also underwent reconstruction/renovation to remove the running track an thus become football-only venues. Several of these projects were done in preparation for the 2006 FIFA World Cup.

A different take on the multipurpose concept can be seen in the Saitama Super Arena in Japan and Paris La Défense Arena in the inner suburbs of Paris. Both venues are similar to JMA Wireless Dome in that they are fully enclosed stadiums (though with fixed roofs instead of the Dome's original air-supported roof) that can accommodate field and indoor court sports. However, they differ from JMA Wireless Dome in the specific way they accommodate court sports. Both the Super Arena (used mainly for basketball, volleyball, mixed martial arts, and professional wrestling events) and Paris La Défense Arena (home of rugby union's Racing 92) feature movable seating blocks that allow each facility to serve as an appropriately sized venue for either field or court sports.

In 2014, Singapore's new National Stadium was opened. It can convert between an oval for cricket, rectangle for rugby and association football, and a running track for athletics.

Kalinga Stadium is a multi-purpose international sports complex in Bhubaneswar, Odisha, India. Construction was begun in 1978. It is best known as the home ground of the Indian Super League football club Odisha FC since that club's inception in 2019. It was the home ground of the I-League club Indian Arrows from 2018 until 2022. Its main stadium is configured for football and athletics, with an 8-lane synthetic athletics track surrounding the football pitch. Field hockey, tennis, table tennis, basketball, volleyball, wall climbing, and swimming are accommodated elsewhere within the complex.

== Criticisms ==
While multipurpose stadiums were intended to easily accommodate both American football and baseball (and in some cases, association football), the fundamentally different sizes and shapes of the playing fields made them inadequate for either sport. When used for baseball, the lower-level boxes were usually set back much farther from the field than comparable seats in baseball-only parks because they swiveled into position for American football and association football. In the case of stadiums that hosted both baseball and Canadian football, the lower boxes were set even farther back than their American counterparts, because Canadian football fields are 30 yards longer and considerably wider than their American counterparts. Likewise, attempts to build stadiums without support columns to obstruct spectators' views, as was the case with sport-specific "jewel box" stadiums, resulted in upper decks being placed very high above the field—as far as 600 feet away in some cases. Several teams closed off sections of the upper level and only sold them during the playoffs, as they were too far away to be of any use during the regular season. For football, the seats nearest the field were set farther back than at football-only stadiums to accommodate the larger baseball field. In some cases, the seats closest to the field, normally prime seats for baseball, were almost at field level for football. In general, spectator sight lines were not optimized for either sport, i.e., seats were angled towards the center of the field rather than towards the logical center of the game action (home plate for baseball and the 50-yard line for football).

In the baseball configuration, most had symmetrical field dimensions. This detracted from the unique, individual identity enjoyed by the sport-specific "jewel box" stadiums with odd or asymmetrical field dimensions, and further supported the "cookie cutter stadium" nickname.

The large capacities of multipurpose stadiums were usually more than adequate for football. However, baseball crowds tend to be much smaller than football crowds, resulting in baseball games at these stadiums being swallowed up in the environment. This was especially true if a baseball team were not doing particularly well either on the field or in the box office. This was another reason some baseball teams closed sections of the upper level during the regular season.

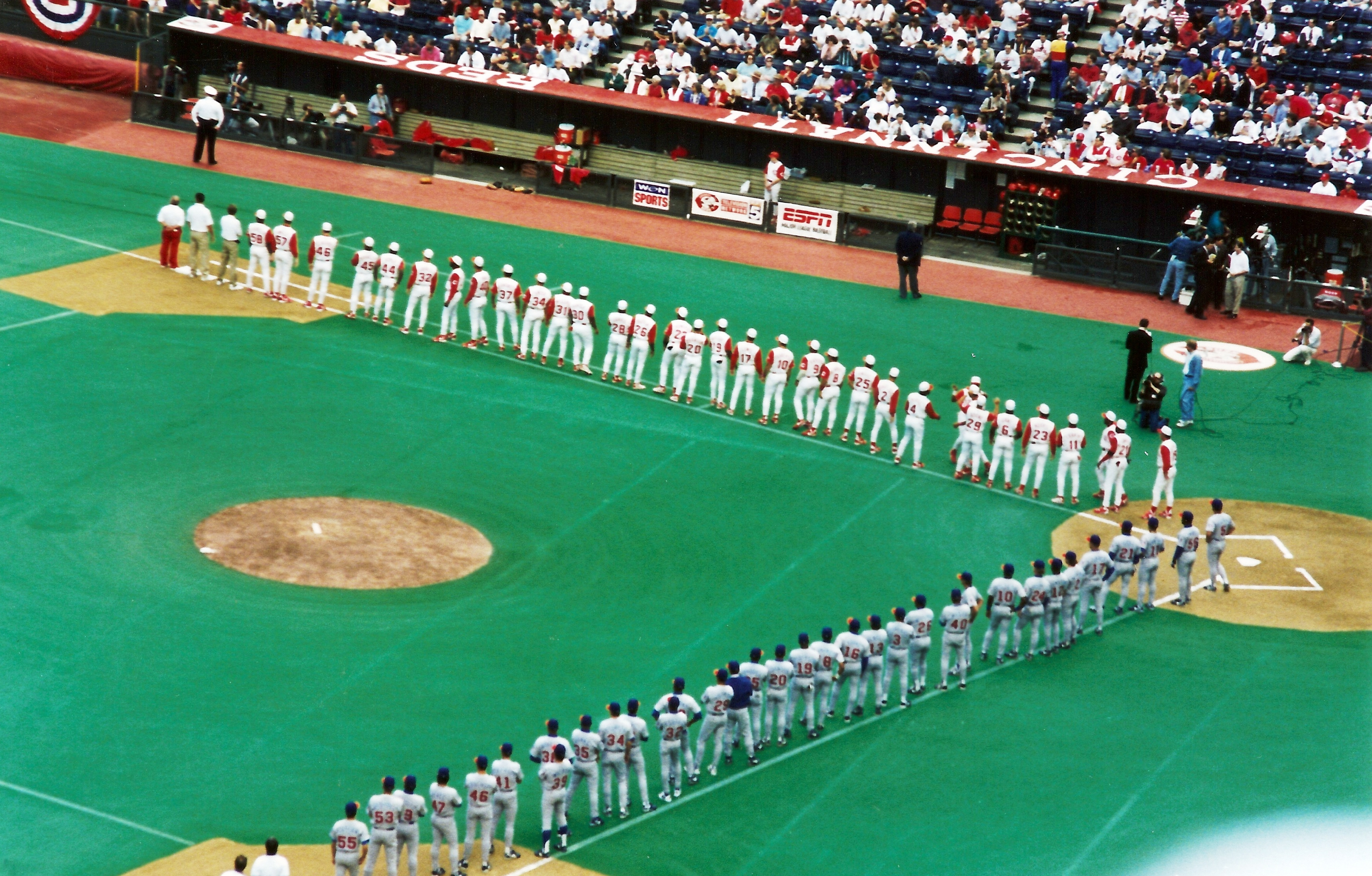
The field markings for football are visible during this April 1995 baseball game at Riverfront Stadium. The dirt "slide pits" used for baseball, common in multipurpose stadiums, are visible.

Field conditions were also an issue. Maintaining grass playing surfaces to any respectable standard against the wear and tear of both baseball and football had been a challenge since football teams had been playing in ballparks, but as colour television became prominent, unsightly dirt, mud and dead grass became far more noticeable to television audiences. In response, many multipurpose stadiums installed artificial turf playing surfaces both for ease of maintenance and to ease the transition from baseball field to football field and vice versa. Most early installations of artificial turf such as the original AstroTurf was nothing more than carpet on top of concrete with little padding, material that was easy to apply and remove. Such types of removable artificial turf caused frequent injuries to players and eventually made free agents wary of signing with teams whose home fields had artificial turf. During the first month of the football season, the playing field included the baseball infield soil that is harder than the grass and is also a significant injury risk. Baseball purists disliked artificial turf, though the Cincinnati Reds took advantage of this on Riverfront Stadium's artificial turf: on offense by recruiting players who combined power and speed and encouraging line drive hitting that could produce doubles, triples, and high-bouncing infield hits; while for defense the fast surface and virtually dirtless infield rewarded range and quickness by both outfielders and infielders, like shortstop Dave Concepción, who used the turf to bounce many of his long throws to first.

The concrete or painted concrete façades of many stadiums of that era (multipurpose or sport-specific) were criticized by architects as uninviting. Most such stadiums were built in the relatively plain brutalist and international styles popular at the time, which fell out of fashion in the 1980s. Furthermore, the "concrete donut" design made the stadium feel too enclosed, and cut off panoramic views of the stadium's aesthetic surroundings (waterfront, skyline, mountains).

The suburban locales of many multipurpose stadiums (as well as other sport-specific stadiums also built there) were also a focal point of criticism. Choosing a suburb over a city core was meant to take advantage of lower land values and new freeways. Suburbs were often poorly serviced by public transit, and when coupled with the trend of personal transportation shifting from public transit to private cars in the mid-20th century, meant that many of the stadiums of that period (multipurpose or sport-specific) were surrounded by large parking lots. In some suburban locales, hospitality, entertainment, and shopping facilities were often non-existent due to lacking the supporting population or due to municipality zoning restrictions. Suburban stadiums fell out of favor by the 1990s, in light of the growing trend of "walkable urbanism", as teams sought to return to the city core where they could develop or take advantage of existing hospitality in order to grow their fanbase. Many teams also relocated to where they could control mixed-use development around their new stadium. Contrary to the above trend of teams moving away from suburbs, the Atlanta Braves left Turner Field for SunTrust Park.

Often the suburban stadium was not located in the municipality that the team purportedly represented, and in some cases the stadium was over a state border. An instance of this was Giants Stadium, which primarily hosted football, but was also an association football stadium at times. Its primary tenants, the New York Giants and New York Jets, were nominally based in New York City, but Giants Stadium was neither in New York City or even New York State. Instead, it was in the Meadowlands of East Rutherford, New Jersey. As a result, then-Governor Mario Cuomo would not attend any games at Giants Stadium (instead choosing to attend the home games of the Buffalo Bills as they were "New York State's only team" in the NFL). A similar criticism applied to Giants Stadium's replacement, MetLife Stadium.

Association football was perceived as an especially bad fit for this type of stadium because, in the United States, soccer does not draw as many fans to games as American football or baseball (with the exceptions of Atlanta and Seattle), resulting in the stadium being filled to only a fraction of its capacity. This, combined with a desire for more compact, intimate stadiums akin to those of European football clubs, led to the soccer-specific stadium movement. As of 2025, 22 of Major League Soccer's 30 clubs play in their own, soccer-specific stadiums, and two of the exceptions (Chicago Fire FC and New York City FC) are currently building their own soccer-specific stadiums.

Scheduling was also a big issue since the MLB postseason overlaps with the NFL regular season. If a baseball team advances in the postseason to the point where it is scheduled to play a postseason game on the same day the football team plays a home game, adjustments had to be made, such as having the game moved to Monday night or – if a division opponent were scheduled – have the game sites switched, putting the upcoming meeting on the road and playing the home game during the latter meeting. An example of the former happening was in 1997 when the Florida Marlins played game 7 of the World Series at home on Sunday, October 26, which moved the Miami Dolphins game against the Chicago Bears to Monday night. An example of the latter happening was in 1989 when the San Francisco Giants hosted a postseason game on Sunday, October 8, against the Chicago Cubs, the same day the San Francisco 49ers were scheduled to host their division rival New Orleans Saints. The October 8 game was moved to New Orleans and the November 6 game was moved to San Francisco.

In Australia, most major stadiums that can hold over 50,000, such as the Melbourne Cricket Ground and Adelaide Oval, are circular or oval-shaped venues which – while suitable for cricket and Australian rules football – pose the same sight-line problems for football, rugby league, and rugby union as an athletics venue would. Playing sports with rectangle-shaped pitches on larger ovals often means fans can be as much as 30 metres (98 ft) or more from the sidelines. Both Stadium Australia in Sydney and the Docklands Stadium in Melbourne have retractable seating, to be able to change from an oval to rectangle shape and bring fans closer to the action if needed. Lang Park in Brisbane is currently (as of 2025) the only purpose-built rectangle stadium in Australia (with fixed seating) with a capacity exceeding 50,000.

== Replacement and retention ==
The first real departure from the multipurpose stadium design occurred in 1972, when the Jackson County Sports Authority in Kansas City, Missouri, opened the Truman Sports Complex, which houses Kauffman Stadium (named Royals Stadium at the time of opening) and Arrowhead Stadium. The Truman Sports Complex was the first example of multiple stadiums being built for specific sports at the same time. The designers, Kivett and Myers, were then absorbed by Kansas City architecture firm Hellmuth, Obata, and Kassabaum to become HOK Sport + Venue + Event (now the independent firm Populous), which went on to design many professional sports venues in the United States. Though hailed as revolutionary at the time, the Truman Sports Complex model of stadium design was widely ignored for the next 20 years, though the influence of both Arrowhead and Kauffman Stadiums were easily seen in venues such as Giants Stadium.

The true end of the multipurpose era began in 1987, when Buffalo's Pilot Field, a stadium built for the Buffalo Bisons minor league baseball team and a potential MLB expansion franchise, opened. Pilot Field replaced the long-obsolete War Memorial Stadium, which had been designed mainly for football, and hosted the NFL's Buffalo Bills; but it had been (awkwardly) fit for baseball after the city's baseball park, Offermann Stadium, was condemned and torn down in 1960 to build a high school in its place. Pilot Field was also designed to host a future MLB team by adding a third deck to the Mezzanine roof. It ultimately served as a temporary home to the Toronto Blue Jays of MLB in 2020 and 2021, when they were displaced by the COVID-19 pandemic after the government of Canada denied them permission to play at Rogers Centre.

During the 1990s and 2000s, most of the multipurpose stadiums used for MLB in the United States were replaced by "retro-style" ballparks. These parks were built in two varieties: "retro-classic" parks, which combine the interior and exterior design of the "classic" ballparks with the amenities of newer facilities; and "retro-modern" parks, which have modern amenities and "retro" interiors, but have modern exterior designs. The first "retro-classic" park in MLB was Oriole Park at Camden Yards in Baltimore, which opened in 1992 and was based mostly on Pilot Field's design. The "retro-modern" park made its first appearance in 1994 with the opening of Jacobs Field, now known as Progressive Field, in Cleveland. Many football teams that shared a stadium with a baseball team had their stadiums converted into football-only facilities shortly after the baseball tenant left, while other football teams followed their baseball counterparts and had new football-only stadiums constructed.

The widespread adoption of FieldTurf, and similar modern artificial turfs beginning in the early 2000s, also has had a role in the decline of the multipurpose stadium. While first-generation, short-pile turfs such as AstroTurf lent themselves well to multiple sports, this was not the case with FieldTurf and its competitors. Modern artificial turf requires a more permanent installation, including a sand and rubber base or infill that is not easily removed, and thus does not lend itself well to multipurpose stadiums. Because of such turfs' superiority in other features, compared to the earlier turfs, it has been seen as easier to build new stadiums for each sport rather than attempt to share an inflexible turf installation among multiple sports. Some 21st-century multi-purpose stadiums, such as Tottenham Hotspur Stadium and State Farm Stadium, have developed a more elaborate method of placing an entire playing surface, such as a grass surface for association football and an artificial turf one for gridiron football, on one or more slabs (one at State Farm, three at Tottenham Hotspur) and towing the slab(s) in and out of place for each sport. Because of the expense of using this method, it is generally only used for the highest-level professional sports.

The Miami Marlins moved to Marlins Park, a new retractable-roof stadium in Miami, in 2012. Sun Life Stadium (now Hard Rock Stadium) was then renovated to eliminate its baseball functionality, making it a football-only stadium. With the Marlins' relocation, the Oakland Athletics were the last team in the U.S. still sharing a stadium with an NFL team (the Oakland Raiders), the Oakland Coliseum (now RingCentral Coliseum). This arrangement ended once the Raiders settled into the new Allegiant Stadium in Las Vegas, Nevada in 2020, leaving no stadiums shared between NFL and MLB franchises. The Athletics officially announced they would begin their relocation process to Las Vegas by 2024.

Currently, North America's main soccer league, Major League Soccer, nominally requires soccer-specific stadiums, although it has allowed several teams that share ownership with other major professional teams to use existing stadiums built either for American football (such as Lumen Field in Seattle and Mercedes-Benz Stadium in Atlanta) or baseball (the current Yankee Stadium). Additionally, the league allows teams to use multi-purpose stadiums as temporary homes while they build new stadiums, with examples including Yankee Stadium, Nippert Stadium in Cincinnati, and Nissan Stadium in Nashville. The now-defunct North American Soccer League had a similar requirement. The current second-level league, the USL Championship, has nominally required soccer-specific stadiums, but like MLS has allowed multiple teams to share stadiums originally built for either American football or baseball.

In Canada, smaller, more specialized stadiums have generally become more popular, but none of the major multiple-use stadiums of the 1970s and 1980s have been demolished as of 2015. The Toronto Blue Jays shared Rogers Centre with the Toronto Argonauts of the CFL before the Argonauts moved to BMO Field after the 2015 season, and shared the facility on a part-time basis with the Buffalo Bills of the NFL for several years beginning in 2008. Before their 2015–16 move, the Argonauts had publicly announced plans to leave Rogers Centre twice, only to end up staying; during that time, the originally soccer-specific BMO Field (built on the site of multi-purpose Exhibition Stadium) was built by Toronto FC. The Blue Jays presently do not have any plans to leave Rogers Centre and have renovated it to make it baseball-specific; the Argonauts had proposed renovating BMO Field so they could share it with Toronto FC in 2016, and the Bills ended their sharing agreement with the Rogers Centre and returned to playing all of its games in Buffalo after the 2013 season. BC Place in Vancouver is still used by the BC Lions and was also the Olympic Stadium for the 2010 Winter Olympics; the Lions played their 2010 season at the temporary Empire Field while BC Place was being renovated to replace the original air-supported roof with a retractable roof. Vancouver Whitecaps FC, which entered Major League Soccer in 2011, shared Empire Field and are sharing the renovated BC Place with the Lions. This was intended to be a temporary arrangement until the MLS team could build their own Whitecaps Stadium, but local opposition to the planned stadium led the Whitecaps to make BC Place a long-term home. The Montreal Expos' owners often cited the inadequacy of Olympic Stadium as a reason for the team's financial troubles, which eventually led to their relocation to Washington, D.C. The Montreal Alouettes, who had folded twice before in Olympic Stadium, moved out of Olympic Stadium in its third incarnation to Molson Stadium. In soccer, the original Montreal Impact built the smaller Saputo Stadium, which was expanded to accommodate the team's 2012 entry into MLS. Both the Alouettes and Impact continue to use Olympic Stadium for playoff games and other special events when extra capacity is needed. Commonwealth Stadium in Edmonton received major upgrades to host the 2001 World Championships in Athletics, and continues to host the Edmonton Elks, but has only hosted the city's soccer team, FC Edmonton, for three matches in Canada's national cup competition, the Canadian Championship.

Still, several modern baseball-specific stadiums are able to be converted for football use. In addition to the aforementioned T-Mobile Park, which has hosted occasional college football games, San Francisco's Oracle Park hosted the San Francisco Demons of the original XFL, hosted the college bowl game now known as the Redbox Bowl from 2002 to 2013, and also hosted California Golden Bears football games in the 2011 season while that team's stadium was being renovated. Phoenix's Chase Field hosted the game then known as the Insight Bowl from 2000 to 2005. St. Petersburg's Tropicana Field hosted the St. Petersburg Bowl from 2008 to 2017. Tropicana Field, being an indoor stadium, hosted the Tampa Bay Lightning ice hockey team for a time. Yankee Stadium hosts the Pinstripe Bowl, New York City FC association football, and various other high-profile college football games.

Furthermore, some teams in the United Football League played their home schedule at a baseball-specific stadium. The California Redwoods played their home games at the aforementioned Oracle Park; though they moved to a football stadium in Sacramento (Sacramento Mountain Lions). In 2010 and 2011, they moved back to a baseball park (this time Raley Field) for 2012. Although their home field was the Citrus Bowl in Orlando, the Florida Tuskers played one 2009 home game at Tropicana Field. The Omaha Nighthawks played their inaugural 2010 season at a baseball park, Rosenblatt Stadium, and played in Rosenblatt's replacement, TD Ameritrade Park Omaha, which is used primarily for baseball's College World Series, until the league's demise.

== See also ==
- Sport venue
- Sports complex
