= Mike Ozdowski =

American football player (born 1955)

No. 71, 51
- Position: Defensive end

Personal information
- Born: September 24, 1955 (age 71); Cleveland, Ohio, U.S.
- Listed height: 6 ft 5 in (1.96 m)
- Listed weight: 243 lb (110 kg)

Career information
- High school: Parma (Parma, Ohio)
- College: Virginia
- NFL draft: 1977: 2nd round, 53rd overall pick

Career history
- Baltimore Colts (1977–1983)
- Stats at Pro Football Reference

Michael Thomas Ozdowski (born September 24, 1955) is an American former professional football defensive end who played four seasons with the Baltimore Colts of the National Football League (NFL). He was selected by the Colts in the second round of the 1977 NFL draft after playing college football at the University of Virginia.

== Early life ==
Ozdowski played high school football at Parma Senior High School in Parma, Ohio, earning three varsity letters and All-State honors as a middle guard. He was a two-time Plain Dealer Player of the Week honoree and was selected to play in the north–south game. He graduated in 1973. Ozdowski was inducted into the Parma Senior High School Athletic Hall of Fame in 2007.

== College career ==
Ozdowski was a four-year varsity letterman for the Virginia Cavaliers. He earned All-ACC, All-Academic, and Player of the Year honors during his college career. He was named the 1977 University of Virginia Athlete of the Year.

== Professional career ==
Ozdowski was selected by the Baltimore Colts in the second round with the 53rd pick in the 1977 NFL draft. He played in 54 games, starting 29, for the Colts from 1978 to 1981. He spent the 1982 season on injured reserve with a neck injury. Ozdowski became the Colts' new player representative during the 1982 NFL lockout after Herb Orvis, the prior representative, was cut by the team. Mike was released by the Colts on March 8, 1983.

== Personal life ==
Ozdowski worked as a math teacher at Saint Augustine High School in San Diego, California.
