= Ron Labinski =

American architect (1937–2023)

- Born: December 7, 1937; Buffalo, New York, U.S.
- Died: January 1, 2023 (aged 85); Prairie Village, Kansas, U.S.
- Occupation: Architect
- Years active: 1960–2000
- Spouse: Lee Beougher
- Children: 2
- Practice: Kivett & Myers; Devine, James, Labinski and Myers (DJLM); HNTB; HOK Sport (now Populous)
- Buildings: Arrowhead Stadium; Giants Stadium; Hard Rock Stadium; Oriole Park; Oracle Park

Ron Labinski (December 7, 1937 – January 1, 2023) was an American architect, notable for influential designs of stadiums for professional baseball and football. Focusing for much of his career on sports venues, Labinski was instrumental in establishing sports and assembly venue design as architectural specialties. Labinski's work led to the establishment of several such specialized firms in Kansas City, composed of many of Labinski's former colleagues, making Kansas City the center of sports-related design. Labinski has been described as the world's first sports venue architect.

== Early life ==
Ronald Joseph Labinski was born on December 7, 1937, in Buffalo, New York. He was the son of Raymond and Bertha Labinski, the second of four siblings. His father was a wholesale food salesman. During Labinski's childhood the family moved to Cleveland and Chicago. Showing an interest in architecture from an early age, Labinski remembered drawing Ebbetts Field as a child, foreshadowing his career. He graduated from Parma Senior High School in 1955. He graduated from the University of Illinois Urbana-Champaign with a Bachelor of Architecture degree. Following graduation in 1962 he studied in Europe on a fellowship for six months, then served in the U.S. Army for two years as an engineer at Fort Riley, Kansas.

== Early career ==
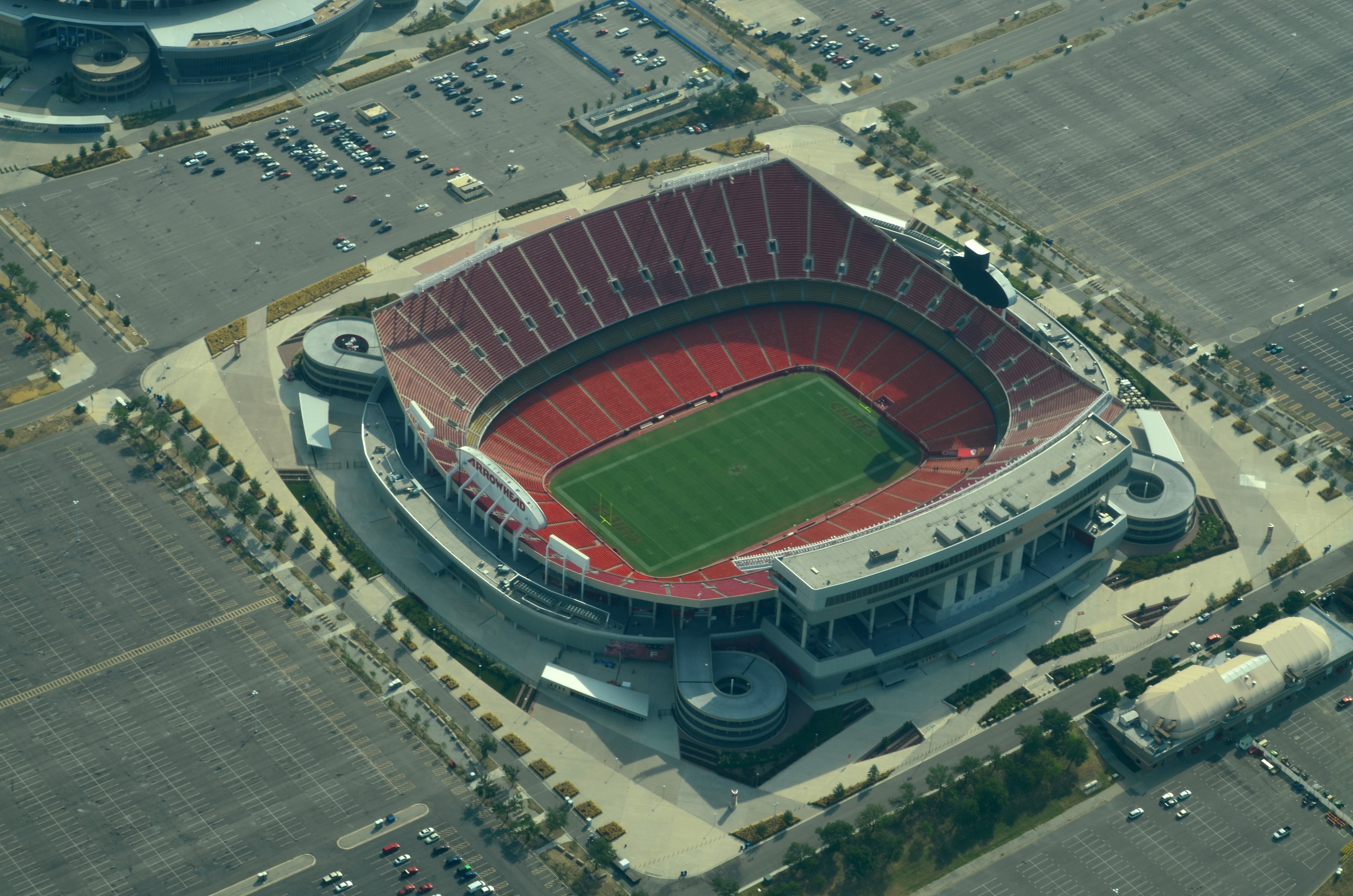
Arrowhead Stadium

After leaving the Army, Labinski worked for an architectural firm in Kansas City designing hospitals. In the early 1970s Labinski worked for the Kansas City architecture firm Kivett and Myers, participating in the design of Arrowhead Stadium with project designer Charles Deaton. Arrowhead was one of the first of a wave of stadiums specifically built for football, supplanting previously popular configurations that attempted to accommodate multiple sports. Following work as a consultant for Rich Stadium in Buffalo and as project architect for Giants Stadium, Labinski became a partner in Devine, James, Labinski & Myers (DJLM) in 1973. Seeing a potential market in stadium design as older stadiums became obsolete, Labinski compiled a list of venues and owners that became the basis for a marketing program that gained him access to sports industry figures and their insights. Using Labinski's design concepts, DJLM submitted a proposal to design the Hoosier Dome in Indianapolis, losing to HNTB. However, Hoosier Dome investors were sufficiently impressed by Labinski to require HNTB to hire Labinski and five DJLM colleagues for the project, becoming the nucleus for a sports architecture studio within HNTB.

== Sports design ==
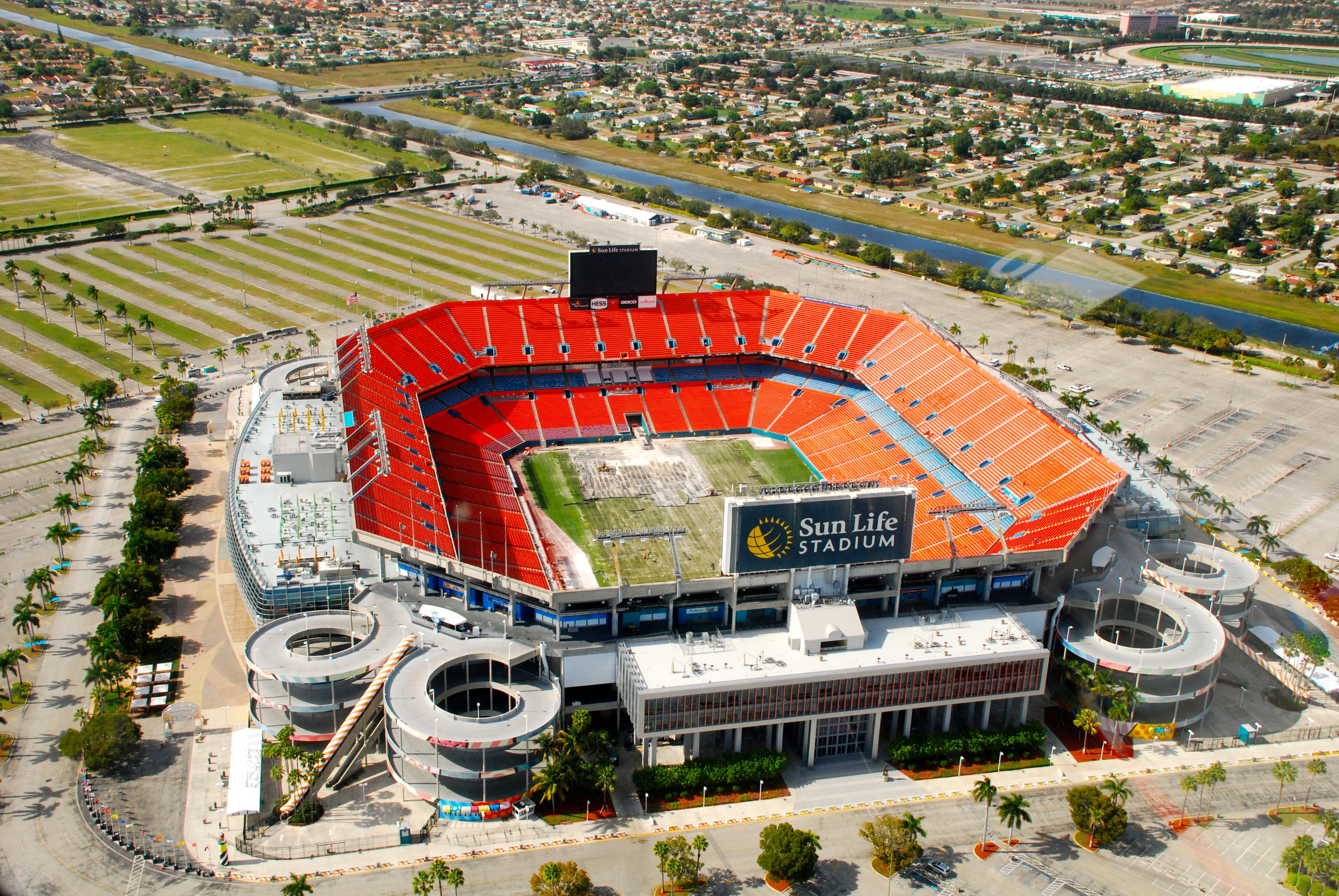
Hard Rock Stadium as Sun Life Stadium, before installation of sunshades

After three years with HNTB, Labinski and several HNTB colleagues moved to the new Kansas City office of St. Louis-based HOK, forming HOK Sport in 1983 (later spun off after Labinski's retirement, and rebranded as Populous). Thirteen of fourteen of HNTB's sports clients followed Labinski to HOK.

At HOK Sport, Labinski was instrumental in moving the design of large sports stadiums from multi-purpose facilities to specialized venues optimized for single sports, with a strong sense of place. The most influential of these was Oriole Park at Camden Yards in Baltimore, which incorporated existing buildings and framed views of the field's surroundings. With Labinski as HOK project principal and Joseph Spear as project architect, the Oriole Park project was derived from the design concept Labinski developed for Pilot Field in Buffalo, and integrated with a design concept developed by Orioles architect and planner Janet Marie Smith and RTKL Associates.

Joe Robbie Stadium marked the first use of club seating, a concept Labinski originated that provided an enhanced revenue stream for stadium owners.

Other stadium designs overseen by Labinski and his group at HOK Sport included Jacobs Field in Cleveland and Oracle Park in San Francisco, where Labinski advocated for the stadium's signature relationship with San Francisco Bay.

Labinski was elected as a member of the American Institute of Architects College of Fellows in 1994.

== Personal life ==
A first marriage ended in divorce. Labinski retired from active design work in 2000. He died January 1, 2023, of frontotemporal dementia at a care facility in Prairie Village, Kansas, at age 85.

== Projects ==
Labinski designed or participated in many stadium projects:

- Arrowhead Stadium (1972), Kansas City
- Giants Stadium (1976, demolished 2010), New Jersey
- Hoosier Dome (1984, demolished 2009 as the RCA Dome), Indianapolis
- Joe Robbie Stadium (1985), now Hard Rock Stadium, Miami
- Pilot Field (1988), now Sahlen Field, Buffalo
- Oriole Park at Camden Yards (1992), Baltimore
- Jacobs Field (1994), now Progressive Field, Cleveland
- Coors Field (1995), Denver, Colorado
- TIAA Bank Field (1995 as Jacksonville Municipal Stadium), Jacksonville, Florida
- Bank of America Stadium (1996 as Ericsson Stadium), Charlotte
- Raymond James Stadium (1998), Tampa, Florida
- M&T Bank Stadium (1998 as Ravens Stadium), Baltimore
- Oracle Park (2000 as Pacific Bell Park), San Francisco
