= Joseph Evans (tenor) =

American tenor, stage director and music educator

Joseph Evans (born 13 August 1945) is an American tenor, stage director, and music educator. Trained at the University of North Texas, Evans made his professional opera debut with the Fort Worth Opera in December 1966 in the world premiere of Julia Smith's The Shepherdess and the Chimney Sweep. In his early career he worked as a music teacher in Dallas and Houston while working part time as a performer. With the encouragement and support of Sarah Caldwell he pursued a full time singing career. He was a principal tenor in Caldwell's Opera Company of Boston from 1974 to 1988.

While singing in Boston, Evans was concurrently a regular performer with the San Diego Opera and the New York City Opera during the late 1970s and early 1980s. Beginning in the mid-1980s his career expanded onto the international stage. Companies he has performed leading roles with include La Scala, La Fenice, the English National Opera, the Welsh National Opera, the Grand Théâtre de Genève, the Bregenzer Festspiele, the Washington National Opera, and the Houston Grand Opera. He has created roles in the world premieres of operas by André Bon, Daniel Catán, Carlisle Floyd, Jake Heggie, Gian Carlo Menotti, and Richard Wargo, and has performed in the United States premieres of operas by composers Mikhail Glinka, Roger Sessions, and Bernd Alois Zimmermann.

In addition to his work in opera, Evans has performed in the concert repertoire with orchestras like the New York Philharmonic and the Buffalo Philharmonic Orchestra. He taught voice on the faculty of the University of Miami before becoming a professor of voice at the University of Houston (UH) in 1998. As of 2024, he remains the C.W. Moores Jr. Endowed Professor of Music at the UH.

== Early life and education ==
Joseph Evans was born in Brookhaven, Mississippi on 13 August 1945, and spent his childhood in that city. At 14 he moved with his family to Winnsboro, Louisiana, where he developed an interest in music. He graduated from Winnsboro High School.

Evans earned degrees in music from the University of North Texas; graduating with a Bachelor of Music (1967) and Master of Music (1973). While an undergraduate he was a finalist in the 1965 Texas state division of the National Association of Teachers of Singing vocal competition; competing as Joey Evans. In his early career as a performer he would continue to use the name Joey Evans. He was later a regional finalist in the Southwest division of the Metropolitan Opera National Council Auditions in 1974.

== Early singing career in Texas ==
After completing his undergraduate degree, Evans lived in Dallas where he was a paid tenor at Temple Emanu-El and the assistant director of music at Highland Park Presbyterian Church. He began his career as a tenor soloist working in a mixture of amateur and professional events that extended from the concert repertoire into opera.

In December 1965 he was the tenor soloist in a presentation of the Christmas portion of George Frideric Handel's Messiah at the First United Methodist Church of McKinney and First Christian Church McKinney. He appeared as the tenor soloist again, this time in a complete presentation of the oratorio, with a community chorus in Grapevine, Texas, the following March 1966. He performed as the tenor soloist in numerous amateur to semi-professional presentations of the Messiah in Texas and Louisiana in the succeeding years, including at Northwestern State University.

Evans spent the summer of 1966 performing as a member of the repertory ensemble at the Casa Mañana Theatre (CMT) in Fort Worth. He performed in several musical theatre productions at the CMT, among them the role of Sir Sagramore in Lerner and Loewe's Camelot (1971) with Jamie Ross as King Arthur and soprano Catherine Christensen as Guenevere; one of the disciples in Godspell (1974) in which he sang the song "All Good Gifts"; and the partial drag role of Joe/"Josephine" in Sugar (1974), a musical adaptation of Some Like It Hot. The latter production also starred Arlington dancer Persis Forster and Broadway musical performer Scott Jarvis.

In the autumn of 1966 Evans won a vocal competition sponsored by the Fort Worth Opera which resulted in his being cast as the Chimney Sweep in the world premiere of Julia Smith's The Shepherdess and the Chimney Sweep with his co-stars being bass-baritone and well-known voice teacher Edward Baird as Mandarin and soprano Elaine Cormany as the Shepherdess. The Fort Worth Opera production premiered on December 28, 1966. He later returned to the FWO in 1973 to perform the roles of Lord Arturo and Normanno in Gaetano Donizetti's Lucia di Lammermoor with Patricia Wise in the title role. He portrayed Beppe in the FWO's 1974 production of Pagliacci with William Lewis as Canio, Louis Quilico as Tonio, and Heather Thomson as Nedda. That FWO season he also performed the part of Gastone in La traviata.

While a graduate student, Evans sang the role of David in the United States' premiere of Handel's Saul at St. Michael and All Angels Episcopal Church in Dallas in March 1968 which was presented in partnership with the Dallas Ballet Theater. In the mid 1960s he performed with the Dallas Symphony Orchestra (DSO) in concerts of Zoltán Kodály's Psalmus Hungaricus and Darius Milhaud's Miracles of Faith. In May 1968 he was the tenor soloist in the world premiere of Samuel Adler's oratorio The Binding which was made in honor of the composer's father, Hugo Chaim Adler. Hugo Adler's 1937 oratorio Akedah was written on the subject, but its score was lost after being confiscated and destroyed by the Nazis just prior to its scheduled premiere in Stuttgart. Samuel Adler conducted the premiere of The Binding with the orchestra being made up of member of the DSO.

Both during and after completing graduate school, Evans worked as a music teacher. While a graduate student he worked as the director of choral music at the Hockaday School in Dallas. After completing his master's degree, he was a public school music teacher in Houston while simultaneously performing in the chorus and in small parts with the Houston Grand Opera (HGO). When conductor Sarah Caldwell was a guest conductor with the HGO she heard Evans sing and strongly encouraged him to pursue a career as a leading operatic tenor, something he had previously not imagined as possible.

== Opera Company of Boston ==
With Caldwell's assistance, Evans left his career as a school teacher to pursue a full time performing career. He joined the group of resident artists at the Opera Company of Boston (OCOB) in 1974, an opera company founded and directed by Caldwell. He began his career performing in OCOB's young artist program, which staged operas with its young artist under the moniker Opera New England (ONE). He made his debut with the ONE on November 16, 1974 as Pinkerton in Giacomo Puccini's Madama Butterfly with Joann Yockey as Cio-Cio-San and Christopher Keene conducting. He sang the role of Ferrando in ONE's 1975 production of Wolfgang Amadeus Mozart's Così fan tutte with Kate Hurney as Despina.

From 1974 to 1988 he had a prolific partnership with the OCOB. He sang in the United States' premieres of multiple operas with the OCOB, including parts in Benvenuto Cellini (1975, as Francesco) Roger Sessions's Montezuma (1976, as Pedro de Alvarado), Mikhail Glinka's Ruslan and Lyudmila (1977 as Bayan), and Stolzius in Bernd Alois Zimmermann's Die Soldaten (1982). Other parts he sang with OCOB included Tebaldo in I Capuleti e i Montecchi (1975), Jaquino in Ludwig van Beethoven's Fidelio, Macduff in Giuseppe Verdi's Macbeth (1976), Rodolfo in Giacomo Puccini's La bohème (1976–1977), the Duke of Mantua in Giuseppe Verdi's Rigoletto (1977), Pluto in Jacques Offenbach's Orpheus in the Underworld (1977), Fenton in Flastaff (1979), Count Almaviva in The Barber of Seville (1979 and 1985), Pinkerton in Madama Butterfly (1979 and 1984), Prince Anatole Kuragin in Sergei Prokofiev's War and Peace (1980), Pollione in Norma (1983), Cavaradossi in Tosca (1986), Ernesto in Don Pasquale (1978 and 1987), and Jason in Luigi Cherubini's Médée (1988).

== Leading tenor in New York and California ==
In 1975 Evans sang the role of Faust in Lili Boulanger's Faust et Hélène at Avery Fisher Hall with the New York Philharmonic (NYP) under Caldwell's baton; a performance which was broadcast on NPR. He was heard with NYP again as the tenor soloist in Lukas Foss's American Cantata in December 1977, this time under the baton Leonard Bernstein. He returned to Avery Fisher Hall in December 1977 as the tenor soloist in the NYP's presentation of Joseph Haydn's Theresienmesse, again under Bernstein.

In October 1976 Evans made his debut with the New York City Opera (NYCO) at the New York State Theater in Lincoln Center as Paris in Jacques Offenbach's La belle Hélène; a role he repeated with the company in 1977. He was thereafter a regular performer with the NYCO in the late 1970s and 1980s. Other roles he performed with NYCO included Captain Tarnitz in Sigmund Romberg's The Student Prince (1980), Gabriel von Eisenstein in Johann Strauss II's Die Fledermaus (1981), Nadir in Georges Bizet's The Pearl Fishers (1981), Roberto in Maria Stuarda (1981), Uldino in Verdi's Attila (1981), Rikard in Song of Norway (1981), Alfredo in La traviata (1982), and Vicomte Camille de Rosillon in Franz Lehár's The Merry Widow (1982), and the Prince in Sergei Prokofiev's The Love for Three Oranges (1981 and 1986).

In 1976 Evans made his debut at Carnegie Hall as the tenor soloist in Antonín Dvořák's cantata The American Flag in a concert with the Buffalo Philharmonic Orchestra and the Cornell University Glee Club and Chorus under conductor Michael Tilson Thomas. He collaborated with Michael Tilson Thomas to record that work for Columbia Records the following year with the Berlin Radio Symphony Orchestra, baritone Barry McDaniel, the choir of St. Hedwig's Cathedral, and the RIAS Kammerchor. In 1981 he was tenor soloist in Gustav Mahler's cantata Das klagende Lied with Buffalo Philharmonic Orchestra being conducted by Julius Rudel at Carnegie Hall.

In 1977 Evans portrayed Alfredo opposite Beverly Sills as Violetta in La traviata at the San Diego Opera, He returned to San Diego to portray the part of Miguel de Denia in the world premiere of Gian Carlo Menotti's La Loca in 1979;. a performance which was recorded for broadcast on NPR radio stations like WNYC‐FM. Other parts he sang with the San Diego Opera included Don Ottavio in Wolfgang Amadeus Mozart's Don Giovanni (1977), Ferrando in Mozart's Così fan tutte (1978), The Prince in Sergei Prokofiev's The Love for Three Oranges (1978 and 1981), Laertes in Ambroise Thomas's Hamlet (1978), the title role in Charles Gounod's Faust (1981), and Pinkerton in Madama Butterfly (1982).

In 1979 Evans portrayed Alfred in Die Fledermaus with the Chautauqua Opera in Upstate New York; having previously performed with that company as Rodolfo La bohème in 1975 and in the title role of Britten's Albert Herring in 1977. In 1982 he sang the role of the priest Eumolpe Igor Stravinsky's mélodrame Perséphone with the New York City Ballet (NYCB) and the orchestra and chorus of the NYCO; a work which was filmed and broadcast on PBS's Great Performances in February 1983. He later was the tenor soloist in the NYCB's 1985, 1988, 1993, and 1994 revivals of George Balanchine's ballet Liebeslieder Walzer which choreographed Johannes Brahms's waltzes of that name. In 1988 he returned to the NYCB as the tenor soloist in a revival of Balanchine's Chaconne which utilized music from Gluck's Orfeo ed Euridice.

== Later performance career ==
In 1980 Evans performed the part of Alfredo again, this time to Patricia Craig's Violetta at the Cincinnati Opera. In 1984 he portrayed Rossini's Count Almaviva at the Connecticut Opera with Allan Glassman as Figaro and Susanne Marsee as Rosina.

In January 1985 Evans was tenor soloist in the world premiere of Ned Rorem's An American Oratorio with the Pittsburgh Symphony Orchestra and the Mendelssohn Choir of Pittsburgh under conductor Robert Page at Heinz Hall. In May 1985 he performed the role of The Younger Son in Britten's The Prodigal Son at La Fenice in Venice, Italy. In August 1985 he portrayed the role of Nicky in the world premiere of Richard Wargo's The Seduction of a Lady at the Lake George Opera Festival, and was also heard there as The Servant in Dominick Argento's The Boor. In December 1985 he made his debut at the Grand Théâtre de Genève in Switzerland as Caprice in Offenbach's Le voyage dans la lune; a production which was filmed for television.

On January 12, 1986, Evans performed the world premiere of Samuel Adler's song cycle Unholy Sonnets in Palm Beach, Florida. In 1987 Evans created the role of Hades in the world premiere of André Bon's Le Rapt de Persephone (The Rape of Persephone) at the Opéra national de Lorraine; a work which he recorded for Cybelia Records.

In 1988 Evans made his debut at La Scala in Milan as Tsarevich Gvidon in Nikolai Rimsky-Korsakov's The Tale of Tsar. That same year he portrayed the shepherd Jirka in Antonín Dvořák's The Devil and Kate at the Wexford Festival Opera; and returned to Wexford in 1989 to portray Wilfried von Ivanhoe in Heinrich Marschner's Der Templer und die Jüdin. In February 1989 he portrayed the role of Alwa in Alban Berg's Lulu at the Opéra de Nantes. In December 1989 he sang the role of Max in Carl Maria von Weber's Der Freischütz under conductor Peter Hirsch at the Welsh National Opera. In 1990 he repeated the role of Jirka at the Opera Theatre of Saint Louis with Phyliss Pancella as Kate.

In January 1991 Evans performed the role of Lucas Wardlaw in the premiere of the revised version of Carlisle Floyd's The Passion of Jonathan Wade at the HGO; a role he later reprised at the Santa Fe Opera in 1996. In September 1991 he made his debut with the English National Opera at the London Coliseum as Rodolfo in La bohème under conductor Guido Ajmone-Marsan with Vivian Tierney as Mimì. He performed with that company again at the Coliseum in February 1992 as the Prince (Königssohn) in Engelbert Humperdinck's Königskinder.

In 1998 Evans performed the role of Mario Cavaradossi in Puccini's Tosca at the Amarillo Opera with María Luisa Tamez in the title role. In 1999 he performed the role of Samson in Camille Saint-Saëns's Samson and Delilah at the Shreveport Opera.

In 2000 Evans starred as Camp Williams in the world premiere of Carlisle Floyd's Cold Sassy Tree at the HGO. That same year he portrayed Captain Vere in Benjamin Britten's Billy Budd at the New Israeli Opera. He repeated that role at the Seattle Opera in 2001. He later portrayed the role of Red Whiskers in that opera for its production at the HGO in 2008.

In 2001 Evans portrayed Curley in Floyd's Of Mice and Menat the Utah Festival Opera, the Bregenzer Festspiele, and the Washington National Opera; a role he repeated at the HGO in 2002. The latter HGO production by Francesca Zambello was recorded and released by Albany Records in 2004. In March 2004 Evans created the role of Richard Smythe in the world premiere of Jake Heggie's The End of the Affair at the HGO. The following October he performed in another world premiere at the HGO, portraying General García in Daniel Catán's Salsipuedes: a Tale of Love, War and Anchovies. He later reprised that part at the HGO in 2008 for a performance that was broadcast live on NPR.

In 2008 Evans portrayed Einstein in the Amarillo Opera's production of Die Fledermaus with Donata Cucinotta as Adele and Suzanne Ramo as Rosalinda. He performed the same part that same year with the Austin Lyric Opera at the Long Center for the Performing Arts. Also in 2008, he returned to the Shreveport Opera as Basilio in The Marriage of Figaro.

In 2010 Evans returned to the HGO as the Rev. Horace Adams in Britten's Peter Grimes. In 2016 he created the role of Sir Charles Sedley in the world premiere of Floyd's Prince of Players at the HGO.

== Director ==
In 2007 Evans directed the Austin Lyric Opera's production of The Barber of Seville.

== Teaching career ==
In 1998 he joined the voice faculty of the University of Houston. He previously taught on the voice faculty of the University of Miami where he began teaching in 1994. As of 2024, he remains a professor of vocal music at the University of Houston where he is currently the C.W. Moores Jr. Endowed Professor of Music.
