= John Bröcheler =

Dutch baritone (1945–2026)

- Born: 21 February 1945; Vaals, Netherlands
- Died: 30 September 2026 (aged 81); Vaals, Netherlands
- Education: Conservatorium Maastricht
- Occupation: Operatic baritone
- Organizations: Dutch National Opera
- Awards: Order of the Netherlands Lion

John Bröcheler (21 February 1945 – 30 September 2026) was a Dutch operatic baritone who began as a concert singer, specializing in contemporary music such as the world premiere of Mauricio Kagel's Mare Nostrum. He was a member of the Dutch National Opera from the 1970s to 2002. His appearance there in Donizetti's Maria Stuarda alongside Joan Sutherland was followed by an international operatic career, performing for example as Mandryka in Arabella by Richard Strauss at the Glyndebourne Festival and in more world premieres such as Menotti's La Loca at the New York City Opera and the complete version of Henze's König Hirsch at the Staatsoper Stuttgart. He portrayed Wotan in Wagner's Ring cycle and characters in 20th-century operas such as Alban Berg's Wozzeck and Lulu, and Reimann's Lear.

== Life and career ==
=== Early life ===
Born in Vaals on 21 February 1945, Bröcheler became a member of the men's choir Het Koninklijk Mannenkoor Cecilia 1837 in 1961, where he performed solo parts beginning with Die zwölf Räuber at age 17. His father and grandfather had also been choir members, and he remained a member for 60 years. Bröcheler studied voice at the Conservatorium Maastricht with Leo Ketelaars and later in Paris with Pierre Bernac. He achieved first prize at the 1969 Landelijk Concours van Nederlandse Vocalisten in 's-Hertogenbosch.

=== Contemporary music ===
Bröcheler gave a recital in Utrecht in 1966, dedicated to contemporary works. In 1974, he took part in the world premiere of Henri Pousseur's Die Erprobung des Petros Hebraicus at the Berliner Festwochen festival, which brought him to the attention of international audiences. It was followed a year later by the world premiere of Mauricio Kagel's Mare Nostrum there.

=== Dutch National Opera ===
Bröcheler made his operatic debut in 1970 with the Dutch National Opera, as Leonetto in Suppé's Boccaccio. He appeared there as Sid in Britten's Albert Herring in 1973. Bröcheler created the title role in Jan van Gilse's Thijl in 1980. He performed the role of Talbot in Donizetti's Maria Stuarda, alongside Joan Sutherland in the title role. He appeared in leading roles at the house such as Mozart's Don Giovanni, Germont in Verdi's La traviata, Marcello in Puccini's La bohème, and in operas by R. Strauss, Mandryka in Arabella and Jochanaan in Salome.

He performed the title role of Alban Berg's Wozzeck in 1994. He portrayed Wotan in Wagner's Ring cycle first in Amsterdam from 1997 to 1999, directed by Pierre Audi and conducted by Hartmut Haenchen. The production was filmed for DVD. Bröcheler appeared in the title role of Aribert Reimann's Lear in 2001. In 2002, he gave his last performances at the house as Dr. Schön in Berg's Lulu, alongside Anja Silja as the Countess Geschwitz, with the Netherlands Philharmonic Orchestra conducted by Haenchen.

=== International opera ===
From 1977, he appeared in the United States, first at the San Diego Opera, as Ford in Verdi's Falstaff, staged by Tito Capobianco, and as Sharpless in Puccini's Madama Butterfly. He performed in the world premiere of Menotti's La Loca in San Diego and at the New York City Opera, alongside Beverly Sills in the title role. In Hamlet by Ambroise Thomas, he performed with Sutherland as Ophelia. He appeared as Verdi's Nabucco with Grace Bumbry as Abigaille at the Los Angeles Opera and in Toronto.

Bröcheler portrayed Amfortas in Wagner's Parsifal at the Oper Frankfurt in 1983. He appeared as Mandryka in Arabella at the 1984 Glyndebourne Festival, conducted by Bernard Haitink. In 1985 he appeared as the Statthalter in the first performance of the completed version of Henze's König Hirsch at the Staatsoper Stuttgart, conducted by Dennis Russell Davies. A recorded excerpt from the third act was later used for the series Musik in Deutschland 1950–2000, with Julia Conwell as the Girl and Helmut Holzapfel as the King. The same year, he first performed at La Scala in Milan, as Jochanaan in Salome by Richard Strauss, followed by Orest in Elektra, and Golaud in Debussy's Pelléas et Mélisande. He also performed as Golaud at the Vienna State Opera in 1988. Bröcheler appeared as Wozzeck again in Berlin, conducted by Claudio Abbado in 1996. He portrayed Wotan in Wagner's Ring cycle at the Theater Bonn in 2001.

=== Concert ===
In 1979, Bröcheler recorded Schumann's Dichterliebe with pianist Tan Crone, which was awarded the Preis der deutschen Schallplattenkritik.

Bröcheler appeared at the 1991 Salzburg Festival in a church concert featuring Gottfried von Einem's cantata An die Nachgeborenen and Bruckner's Te Deum, conducted by Hans Graf.

=== Death ===
Bröcheler died on 30 September 2026 at the age of 81. The conductor Ed Spanjaard, who often worked with him, describes his voice as "robust, incredibly expressive, sonorous, and singing from the heart".

== Awards ==
- 2005 Knight of the Order of the Netherlands Lion
- 2018 Honorary citizen of Vaals
