= König Hirsch =

Opera by Hans Werner Henze

König Hirsch Il re cervo
- Opera by Hans Werner Henze
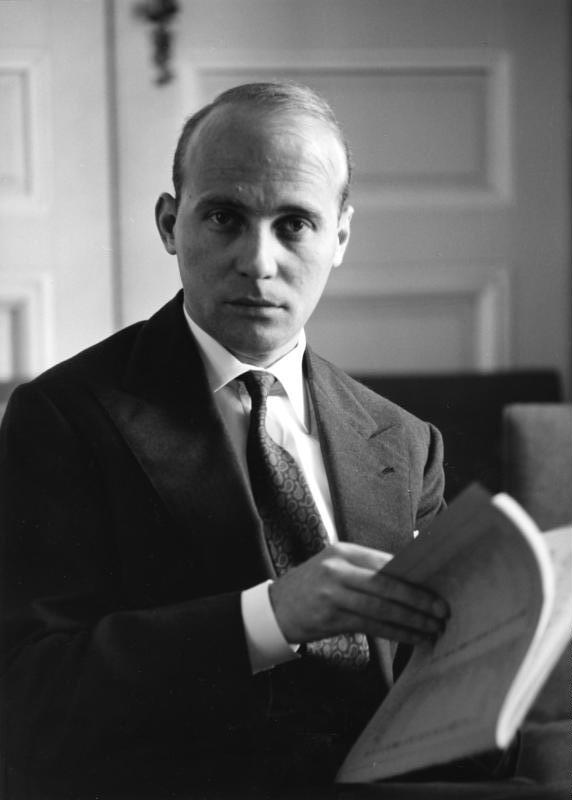
- The composer in 1960
- Translation: The Stag King
- Librettist: Heinz von Cramer
- Language: German
- Based on: Il re cervo by Carlo Gozzi
- Premiere: 23 September 1956; Theater des Westens, Berlin

König Hirsch (in English, The Stag King) is an opera in three acts by Hans Werner Henze to a German libretto by Heinz von Cramer after Il re cervo, a theatrical fable (1762) by Carlo Gozzi. He revised it as Il re cervo, premiered in 1963 at the Staatstheater Kassel.

== Performance history ==
König Hirsch was first performed in a drastically shortened version by the Städtische Oper Berlin on 23 September 1956 in the Theater des Westens with staging by Jean-Pierre Ponnelle and conducted by Hermann Scherchen as a highlight of the Berliner Festwochen 1956.

It was rewritten as Il re cervo, oder Die Irrfahrten der Wahrheit (The Stag King or The Odysseys of Truth) and performed at the Staatstheater Kassel on 10 March 1963. This version was also produced at the Santa Fe Opera on 4 August 1965. The complete, original form of König Hirsch was given for the first time on 5 May 1985 at the Staatsoper Stuttgart.

== Roles ==
Roles, voice types, premier cast
Role	Voice type	Premiere cast, 23 September 1956 Conductor: Hermann Scherchen
The king (Leandro)	tenor	Sándor Kónya
The governor (Tartaglia)	bass-baritone	Leopold Clam
The maiden (Costanza)	soprano	Helga Pilarczyk
The preceptor	bass	Tomislav Neralic
Checco	tenor	Helmut Krebs
Coltellino	tenor	Martin Vantin
Scollatella I	soprano	Nora Jungwirth
Scollatella II	soprano	
Scollatella III	mezzo-soprano	
Scollatella IV	contralto	
Woman in black	contralto	
Statue I	soprano	
Statue II	soprano	
The stag	mime	
Voices in the forest, courtiers, animals, huntsmen, soldiers, city dwellers (chorus)

== Synopsis ==
The king, who has been cast into the forest as a child by the governor, returns to his kingdom. However he is tricked by the governor and forced to go back to the forest where he turns into a stag. Eventually he goes back once again, the governor is killed, and he is transformed again into human form.

== Instrumentation ==
- Woodwinds: 3 flutes (3rd doubling on piccolo), 2 oboes, English horn, 2 clarinets, bass clarinet, 2 bassoons, contrabassoon
- Brass: 4 horns, 3 trumpets (3rd doubling on piccolo trumpet in C [ad lib.]), 2 trombones, tuba
- Percussion (7 players): triangle, tubular bells, suspended cymbals, pair of cymbals, tamtam, 3 tom-toms, tambourine, snare drum, military drum, bass drum (with or without cymbals), claves, maracas, legno, Gegenschlagstöcke, rumba bells, glockenspiel, xylophone
- Other: harp, piano, celesta, organ (ad lib.), harpsichord, accordion, guitar, mandolin
- On-stage band: flute, clarinet, 4 horns, 3 trumpets; percussion: triangle, small bells, tubular bells, suspended cymbals, pair of cymbals, tambourine, 2 snare drums, military drum, bass drum; glockenspiel, vibraphone, mandolin, celesta, organ, violin

== Recordings ==
To date the opera has not been recorded in its entirety. An excerpt (act 3, scene 5) from a performance recorded by the Südwestrundfunk Stuttgart in 1985 (Julia Conwell, soprano; John Bröcheler, bass-baritone; Helmut Holzapfel, tenor-buffo; Würtembergisches Staatsorchester Stuttgart; Dennis Russell Davies, conductor) is included as part of:

- Neue Harmonien: Oper 1948–1962. CD recording, one disc. RCA Red Seal BMG Ariola Classics 74321 73539 2. Musik in Deutschland, 1950–2000: Musiktheater: Oper, Operette, Musical. [Germany]: BMG Ariola Classics, RCA Red Seal, Deutscher Musikrat, 2002.
