= Leo Ketelaars =

Dutch violinist and baritone (1913–1992)

- Born: 23 December 1913; Maasniel, Roermond, Netherlands
- Died: 26 January 1992 (aged 78); Vaals, Netherlands
- Education: Aachen Conservatory; Maastricht Conservatory
- Occupations: Violinist; Baritone; Theatre manager; Academic voice teacher
- Organizations: Theater Aachen; Het Zingende Zuiden; Tilburg Conservatory; Maastricht Conservatory
- Awards: Order of Orange-Nassau

Leo Ketelaars (23 December 1913 – 26 January 1992) was a Dutch violinist, operatic baritone, opera manager and academic voice teacher. Beginning as a violinist, his voice was discovered by Herbert von Karajan and trained by Suze Luger at the Maastricht Conservatory. He was mainly active in concert, recording with Eugen Jochum, among others.

== Life ==
Ketelaars was born in Maasniel, Roermond, the son of policeman Antonius Petrus Paulus Ketelaars and Petronella Thissen. He moved to Vaals with his parents in 1922 when he was nine years old. At the age of twelve, he started playing the violin, introduced by Jules Dreissen (1893–1949). In addition, he learned to piano, and harmony. He studied violin and conducting at the Aachen Conservatory

In the second half of the 1930s, Ketelaars worked as a violinist at the Theater Aachen then conducted by Generalmusikdirektor Herbert von Karajan who discovered his voice and recommended him to become an opera singer. In 1937, Ketelaars made his debut as a singer on radio, before vocal training. In 1938, he completed his studies with distinction. He also studied organ and choral conducting.

From 1946, Ketelaars studied voice for three years with Suze Luger at the Maastricht Conservatory, making his concert debut in 1949. He took part in an international singing competition, Union Bel Canto, in The Hague in 1949, performing the aria "Es ist genug" from Mendelssohn's Elijah. which won him first prize and a gold medal. This victory made him famous and much in demand.

In the 25 following years, Ketelaars worked very successfully with well-known soloists, orchestras and conductors, including Eduard van Beinum and Bernard Haitink. From 1945 to 1957, he was also musical director of the operetta ensemble Het Zingende Zuiden in his home town of Vaals. He recorded the role of Olivier in Capriccio by Richard Strauss in the 1953, conducted by Johannes den Hertog and alongside Lisa Della Casa as the Countess. He took part in a 1966 recording of Bach's St Matthew Passion, conducting by Eugen Jochum, singing the bass arias with the Groot Omroepkoor Hilversum (Great Radio Choir Hilversum), the Concertgebouw Orchestra, Ernst Haefliger as the Evangelist, Walter Berry as the vox Christi, Agnes Giebel, Marga Höffgen, John van Kesteren and Franz Crass.

After a heart attack he had to end his singer career. He worked as a voice teacher in Tilburg and at the Maastricht conservatory. Among his students were John Bröcheler, Hubert Delamboye, Adriaan van Limpt and Tine van Grootel.

On 1 May 1977, Ketelaars was awarded the Dutch Order of Orange-Nassau for his life's work. He spent the last years of his life, marked by illness, with his wife, Justina (Justi) Hubertina Kocks from an artistically and musically talented family, their daughter and son, and two grandchildren.

Ketelaars died in Vaals at the age of 79. The headline of an obituary was the beginning of "Wenn ich einmal soll scheiden", a chorale Bach from Bach's St Matthew Passion.
