= Sugar (musical) =

1972 musical

- Original cast recording
- Music: Jule Styne
- Lyrics: Bob Merrill
- Book: Peter Stone
- Basis: 1959 film Some Like It Hot
- Productions: 1972 Broadway; 1974 First National Tour; 1975 Mexico City; 1986 Buenos Aires, Argentina; 1992 West End; 2002 Second National Tour; 2012 San Francisco; 2011 Denmark; 2016 Barcelona; 2017 2018 Buenos Aires revival; 2019 Mar del Plata; 2019 Mexico City revival; 2025 South Korea

Sugar is a 1972 musical with a book by Peter Stone, music by Jule Styne, and lyrics by Bob Merrill. The musical is based on the 1959 film Some Like It Hot, which was adapted by Billy Wilder and I.A.L. Diamond from a story by Robert Thoeren and Michael Logan.

The musical's name, spotlighting the lead female character, resulted from producer David Merrick being unable to license the film title. A revised Sugar with additional songs would tour nationally between 2002 and 2003 as Some Like It Hot: The Musical, boosted by the casting of film star Tony Curtis as elderly millionaire Osgood.

== Synopsis ==
Two unemployed musicians, bass player Jerry and saxophone player Joe, witness the St. Valentine's Day Massacre in Chicago. In order to escape gangster Spats Palazzo and his henchmen, they dress as women and join Sweet Sue and Her Society Syncopaters, an all-female band about to leave town for an engagement at a Miami Beach hotel.

Complications arise when Joe, now known as Josephine, falls in love with beautiful band singer Sugar Kane, who has a slight drinking problem that tends to interfere with her ability to choose a romantic partner wisely. More than anything, Sugar wants to marry a millionaire, prompting Joe to disguise himself as the man of her dreams.

Meanwhile, wealthy and elderly Osgood Fielding Jr. is pursuing Daphne, unaware she really is Jerry in drag. As much as he knows he needs to reveal his true gender to his over-amorous paramour, Jerry is beginning to enjoy all the expensive gifts bestowed upon him on a regular basis.

Total chaos erupts when Spats and his gang descend upon the hotel and realize who Josephine and Daphne really are.

== History ==
Produced by David Merrick and directed and choreographed by Gower Champion, Sugar opened on Broadway at the Majestic Theatre on April 9, 1972 after 14 previews and closed on June 23, 1973 after 505 performances. Scenic design was by Robin Wagner, costume design by Alvin Colt, and lighting design by Martin Aronstein. Elaine Joyce was replaced by Pamela Blair later in the run.

The original Broadway cast recording was released on LP by United Artists Records in 1972 (catalog no. UAS-9905), orchestrated by Philip J. Lang. It was reissued on CD by Rykodisc in 1999 and later went out of print. In 2010, Kritzerland issued a limited two-CD edition of 1,000 copies pairing a remaster of the original album mix with a new alternate mix created from the surviving sixteen-track session tapes, after the label determined the Rykodisc CD had reproduced the original mix's heavy reverb rather than presenting the cleaner source recordings.

A west coast tour followed in the fall of 1974, with performances in Los Angeles and San Francisco. Ritchard was to have performed the part of Osgood, but he fell ill shortly before the opening and was replaced by Gale Gordon.

== Original cast and characters ==
Character	Broadway (1972)	First National Tour (1974)	West End (1992)	Second National Tour (2002)
Sugar "Kane" Kowalczyk	Elaine Joyce	Leland Palmer	Mandy Perryment	Jodi Carmeli
Jerry/Daphne	Robert Morse	Robert Morse	Billy Boyle	Timothy Gulan
Joe/Josephine	Tony Roberts	Larry Kert	Tommy Steele	Arthur Hanket
Osgood Fielding	Cyril Ritchard	Gale Gordon	Royce Mills	Tony Curtis
Sweet Sue	Sheila Smith	Virginia Martin	Veronica Clifford	Lenora Nemetz
Spats	Steve Condos	Steve Condos	Steven Osborne	William Ryall
Bienstock	Alan Kass	Joe Ross	Edward Phillips	Gerry Vichi

== Song list ==
Act I

- "When You Meet a Man in Chicago" - Sweet Sue and All Girl Band
- "Penniless Bums" - Jerry, Joe and Unemployed Musicians
- "Tear the Town Apart" - Spats's Gang
- "The Beauty That Drives Men Mad" - Jerry and Joe
- "We Could Be Close" - Jerry and Sugar Kane
- "Sun on My Face" - Jerry, Joe, Sugar Kane, Sweet Sue, Bienstock and Ensemble
- "November Song" - Millionaires and Osgood Fielding Jr.
- "Sugar - Jerry and Joe

Act II

- "Hey, Why Not!" - Sugar Kane and Ensemble
- "Beautiful Through and Through" - Osgood Fielding Jr. and Jerry
- "What Do You Give to a Man Who's Had Everything?" - Joe and Sugar Kane
- "Magic Nights" - Jerry
- "It's Always Love" - Joe
- "When You Meet a Man in Chicago" - Jerry, Joe, Sugar Kane, Sweet Sue, All Girl Band and Chorus Line

A final song, "People in My Life" (Sugar), was taken out during the previews, but has appeared in some later productions.

== Productions ==
In 1974 the Casa Mañana Theatre in Dallas staged a production of Sugar starring Scott Jarvis as Jerry/Daphne, Joey Evans as Joe/"Josephine", and Persis Forster as Sugar Kane. Jarvis had worked as Robert Morse's standby during the Broadway run, and had played the part on occasion during its New York run.

In 1975, a version was produced in the Teatro de los Insurgentes of Mexico City. It starred the singer Enrique Guzmán and the actors Héctor Bonilla (alternando con Xavier López "Chabelo") and Sylvia Pasquel. Due to the tremendous success, the musical was staged in Madrid, Spain two years later with the majority of the original cast of Mexico.

In 1986 a successful production was staged at the Teatro Lola Membrives in Buenos Aires, Argentina. Susana Giménez as Sugar Kane, Arturo Puig as Joe/Josephine and Ricardo Darín as Jerry/Daphne was the stars of this version accompanied by Norma Pons and Ambar La Fox, with Gogó Andreu as Osgood Fielding Jr. The director of this production, which closed three years later in 1988, was Mario Morgan.

In 1990, a production of "Sugar" was staged at the theatre Pozorište na Terazijama in Belgrade, then Yugoslavia (modern day Serbia), under the title Some like it hot (Neki to vole vruće). The show was directed by Soja Jovanović, with Svetislav Goncić as Jerry/Daphne, Rade Marjanović as Joe/Josephine, and Ivana Mihić In the titular role of Sugar. The production was a smashing success, and went on to become the longest running production in the history of theatre in Serbia, continuously running for over 30 years, and is still running to this day. Over the years, almost all of the original cast members have left the show, except for the two principals in the roles of Jerry and Joe, who were the ones most responsible for the enduring success of the production. In 2022, Marjanović stepped down from the part of Joe and took over the part of Bienstok, with Žarko Stepanov taking on the part of Joe.

The West End production, starring Tommy Steele, opened at the Prince Edward Theatre on March 19, 1992 and closed on June 20, 1992. The production reverted to the film's title of Some Like It Hot.

The production reverted to the film's title of Some Like It Hot. The production's cast recording was released as Some Like It Hot: Original London Cast Recording.

A 2002-03 United States national tour starred Tony Curtis as Osgood Fielding Jr. in a revised production, titled Some Like It Hot: The Musical. Curtis had played Joe in the original film. This national tour wardrobe is on display at the Costume World Broadway Collection in Pompano Beach, Florida.

A new production of the show ran at the Westchester Broadway Theatre in Elmsford, New York April 2010 through July 2010.

In February/March 2011 Pimlico Opera presented a new production in Great Britain at Send Prison in Surrey. The cast included professional actors and inmates.

On March 6, 2011, Musical Theatre West in Long Beach, California presented a staged concert version of the show, as part of the Reiner Reading Series with Larry Raben (Forever Plaid), Bets Malone (The Marvelous Wonderettes) and Nick Santa Maria (The Producers (musical)).

A Danish production of the show ran in 2011 at Folketeateret in Copenhagen under the title "Ingen er Fuldkommen" ("Nobody's Perfect"). The show opened in October and starred Danish musical actress Maria Lucia.

42nd Street Moon presented Sugar as part of its 19th Season, April 4–22, 2012.

In 2016 started a new production of the musical in Barcelona, Spain. The whole play was translated into Spanish and Catalan and had been in theaters until April 2018.

In 2019, the musical is returning to Teatro de los Insurgentes, in Mexico City, to be premiered on October 17. The cast includes famous Mexican actors like Arath de la Torre and Ariel Miramontes.

The musical was staged in South Korea from 2025 to 2026, with singer Solar of the girl group Mamamoo cast in the lead role as Sugar.

== Critical reception ==
In his review of the Broadway production, Time theatre critic T.E. Kalem thought the musical "has been so thoroughly processed, refined and filtered that it has lost the natural energy that makes a good musical strong and healthy." He added, "If hummable songs are a plus, Jule Styne's songs are hummable, though you may not know quite which homogenized number you are humming. As for Bob Merrill's lyrics, they are the labored products of a man hovering over a rhyming dictionary. Sugar is almost a textbook case of a musical born after its time. It may well enjoy great wads of audience favor. But in the past three years, Company and Follies have altered the critical perspective by providing a musical form that is spare, intelligent, ironic, mature and capable of sustaining three-dimensional characters." He concluded, "This is not to say that the big, old-fashioned musical is irrevocably doomed, but it must have a singular mood, manner and meaning all its own. Otherwise, all that remains, as Sugar indicates, is a sterile display of high-gloss techniques."

Dyan McBride, director of a 2012 San Francisco production of the musical, noted in an interview that "Written in 1972, Sugar really has one of the last Golden Age of Broadway scores.... You can feel contemporary Broadway starting to come.... This is not a rock 'n' roll score; this is really a jazzy score. But you can start to hear things changing; there's a little bit of lounge, and you can hear some Bob Goulet."

== Awards and nominations ==
Original Broadway production

Year	Award	Category	Nominee	Result
1973	Tony Award	Best Musical		Nominated
1973	Tony Award	Best Performance by a Leading Actor in a Musical	Robert Morse	Nominated
1973	Tony Award	Best Direction of a Musical	Gower Champion	Nominated
1973	Tony Award	Best Choreography	Gower Champion	Nominated
1973	Drama Desk Award	Outstanding Actor in a Musical	Robert Morse	Won
1973	Theatre World Award		Elaine Joyce	Won

== See also ==
- Some Like It Hot, 2022 musical based on the same source material, but some plot details changed.
