= David Bennett (opera director) =

American opera director

- Born: c. 1963 (age 62–63); Kansas City, Missouri
- Occupations: Opera singer and director
- Known for: General director of San Diego Opera

David Bennett (born c. 1963) is the general director of the San Diego Opera. Prior to that he was the executive director of Gotham Chamber Opera. He began his opera career as a singer, performing as a baritone for multiple companies.

== Early life and education ==
Bennett was born in Kansas City, Missouri. His mother was a pianist and piano teacher, and his brother is a jazz trumpeter. He began singing and acting in high school and began to focus on opera in college. He earned a degree in music from Texas Christian University. He has Master of Business Administration and Master of Arts Administration degrees from Southern Methodist University.

== Career ==
A baritone, he performed as an opera singer for more than a decade, with appearances at the Dallas Opera, the Dallas Symphony, Skylight Opera Theater, and Florentine Opera of Milwaukee, among others.

He then moved into management. He served as a consultant to Arts Resources International, then became managing director of Dance New Amsterdam in New York City. In 2006 he went to work for the Gotham Chamber Opera as managing director and was named executive director in 2010. He was regarded as an innovator, broadening the company's repertoire and presenting productions in unorthodox venues. During his tenure the company's operating budget tripled and the number of fully staged productions grew from one to four per season. However, after his departure the Chamber Opera was discovered to be deeply in debt, and it went out of business in 2015.

He has also served as vice chair of Opera America. Marc Scorca, president and CEO of Opera America, described him as "one of the most creative, energetic and effective opera leaders in the country".

In March 2015 the San Diego Opera announced his hiring as general director, replacing Ian Campbell, who left in May 2014 after unsuccessfully proposing a controversial shutdown of the opera company. Bennett is the fourth general director in the company's 50-year history. Assuming San Diego Opera's leadership in 2015 after its near-death experience, he was "tasked with downsizing and reimagining the company for 21st century audiences." Under his supervision the company's budget was cut from $18 million in 2014 to $10 million in 2018. There are three traditional opera productions each year, along with a "Detour series" of smaller, more innovative works and increased community outreach programs. In 2018 the board of directors renewed his three-year contract for another three years, with the board chairman commenting, "David is clearly the leader San Diego Opera needs at this point in time."
