= Edward A. Baird =

American music educator and conductor

Edward Allen Baird (18 March 1933 – 2 August 2000) was an American bass, music educator, and choral conductor. He had a celebrated career as a voice teacher at the University of North Texas where he taught from 1962 until his death in 2000. He had previously taught on the faculty of Midland College (now Midland University) from 1957 to 1960; notably serving as that school's Chair of Fine Arts in 1959–1960. While working on his doctorate in vocal music at the University of Michigan he worked as a teaching fellow at that institution from 1960 to 1962. He was the first student at the UM to earn a Ph.D. diploma in vocal music. From 1985 to 1987 he was President of the National Association of Teachers of Singing. Several of his students had successful careers as singers, and three of his students won the Metropolitan Opera National Council Auditions.

In addition to teaching, Baird also had a career as a bass in operas and oratorios. He was particularly active in concerts with the Dallas Symphony Orchestra and in operas with the Fort Worth Opera but also appeared with the Chicago Symphony Orchestra, Houston Grand Opera, and others.

== Early life, education ==
Edward Allen Baird was born on 18 March 1933 in Kansas City, Missouri. He was the son of Edward A Baird and Mary S Baird (née Bradly). At the time of the 1940 United States census he was residing with his family in Marlborough, Missouri. He studied at the University of Missouri–Kansas City where he graduated with B.A. in Music in 1955 and a M.A. in Music in 1954. While a student there he performed in several university concert and opera performances; including performing the role of Leporello in Wolfgang Amadeus Mozart's Don Giovanni (1956), and serving as the bass soloist in a performance of Franz Schubert's Mass No. 2 (1956). He also worked for recreation department of the Kansas City Welfare Department from 1954 to 1956 as the supervisor of music programming.

Baird pursued further graduate studies in voice under baritones Ralph Herbert at the University of Michigan (UM) where he earned a Doctor of Musical Arts in 1962. He was notably the first vocalist to earn a doctorate from the UM's School of Music, Theatre, and Dance. That same year he placed third in the Great Lakes Region of the Metropolitan Opera National Council Auditions.

== Vocal music educator ==
After completing his master's degree, Baird joined the faculty of Midland College (now Midland University) in Fremont, Nebraska where he was an assistant professor of voice from 1957 to 1959 and the chairman of the Department of Fine Arts in 1959–1960. He was director of The A Cappella Choir of Midland College from 1956 to 1960.

While pursuing his doctorate, he worked as a teaching fellow at the University of Michigan from 1960 to 1962. In 1962 he taught on the faculty of the Interlochen Center for the Arts, and that same year was appointed assistant professor of music at the University of North Texas (UNT). He became an associate professor at UNT in 1964 and a professor in 1968. He taught at UNT for 39 years; a portion of which was spent as Director of Graduate Studies. In his early years at UNT he concurrently worked as a paid church vocalist in Dallas at both Cathedral Church of Saint Matthew and Temple Emanu-El, Dallas.

Baird was a prominent American voice teacher, and notably served as President of the National Association of Teachers of Singing (NATS) from 1985 to 1987. He later worked for seven years as site coordinator for NATS's national convention, was a NATS Intern Program Master Teacher in 1993, and served as President of the NATS Foundation from 1998 until his death in 2000. He also assisted the United Kingdom's The Association of Teachers of Singing with developing an intern program for voice teachers after the model developed by NATS.

Notable singers who studied with Baird included three winners of the Metropolitan Opera National Council Auditions: tenors John Carpenter and Timothy Jenkins, and bass Mark McCrory. Other pupils include the soprano Frances Ginzer.

== Performance career ==
In 1960 Baird performed the title role in Felix Mendelssohn's Elijah alongside Frances Greer as the Widow at the Interlochen Center for the Arts with the Interlochen Festival Chorus and Orchestra being directed by Maynard Klein. He returned to Interlochen in 1962 as the bass soloist in Joseph Haydn's The Creation under conductor Margaret Hillis; a part he also performed with the Chicago Symphony Orchestra in their 1962–1963 season.

Baird was a longtime performer with the Fort Worth Opera (FWO). He began performing with the FWO in 1963. He performed a total of 43 different productions with the company. Some of the parts he performed at the FWO included Abimélech in Samson and Delilah (1966), Crespel in The Tales of Hoffmann (1964), Conte Carnero in The Gypsy Baron (1966), Lodovico in Otello (1966), Basilio in The Barber of Seville (1967), Raimondo in Lucia di Lammermoor (1967), Dottore Grenvil in La traviata (1968 and 1974), Bartolo in The Marriage of Figaro (1968), Geronte di Ravoir in Manon Lescaut (1968), Samuel in Un ballo in maschera (1969), the Sacristan in Tosca (1969), William Jennings Bryan in The Ballad of Baby Doe (1970), Colline in La bohème (1971), Talpa in Il tabarro (1974), Don Pedro in La Périchole (1976), Elder McLean in Susannah (1976), the King in Aida (1976), both the police inspector and the notary in Der Rosenkavalier (1977), both Cesare Angelotti and the jailer in Tosca (1977), and the title role in The Mikado (1977).

In the 1966–1967 season, Baird performed the title role in Don Pasquale and the role of the Major Domo in Ariadne auf Naxos with the Lyric Opera of Kansas City. In November 1966 he performed the role of the King in Aida at the San Diego Opera with Lucine Amara in the title role. He also appeared as a guest artist with the Houston Grand Opera and the Opera Theatre of Saint Louis during his career.

In March 1969 Baird performed the role of Joad the High Priest in the United States premiere of Handel's Athalia in Dallas. In 1971 he was bass soloist in George Frideric Handel's Messiah with the New Orleans Symphony. That same year he portrayed Jud Fry in Rodgers and Hammerstein's Oklahoma! at Casa Mañana, and appeared as a soloist with the Dallas Symphony Orchestra (DSO) in Handel's Messiah under Anshel Brusilow. In previous seasons he had performed with the DSO as a soloist in Johann Sebastian Bach's Mass in B minor, Ludwig van Beethoven's Symphony No. 9, and Hector Berlioz's La damnation de Faust.

== Personal life ==
On June 29, 1952 Baird married Shirley Jean Vedder. They had one son, Keith Allen Baird. Baird died in Denton, Texas on August 2, 2000.

== Bibliography ==
- Blades, Elizabeth L. (2017). A Spectrum of Voices: Prominent American Voice Teachers Discuss the Teaching of Singing. Rowman & Littlefield Publishers. ISBN 9781538107010.
- Hart, Martha L. (1998). The Art of Making Opera: Two Seasons with San Diego Opera : a Personal View. San Diego Opera.
- Press, Jaques C., ed. (1985). "Baird, Edward Allen". Who's who in American Music, Classical, Volume 2. R.R. Bowker Company.
