= Scott Jarvis (actor) =

American actor (1941–1990)

- Born: Ralph Jerome Jarvis; April 9, 1941; Ohio, U.S.
- Died: February 26, 1990 (aged 48); New York City, New York, U.S.
- Occupation: Actor
- Years active: 1966–1990

Scott Jarvis (April 9, 1941 – February 26, 1990) was an American actor of stage and screen. He was mainly active as a musical theatre actor from the mid-1960s into the late 1980s. He is best remembered for creating the role of the Courier in the original Broadway production of Sherman Edwards and Peter Stone's musical 1776 in which he was critically acclaimed for his performance of the song "Momma Look Sharp".

== Early life and education ==
Scott Jarvis was born with the name Ralph Jerome Jarvis in Ohio on April 9, 1941. He grew up in Parma, Ohio. He was the son of Walter C. Jarvis and Alma A. Arent. He graduated from Parma Senior High School in 1959. In his senior year, he performed in a school production of Ayn Rand's Night of January 16th as District Attorney Flint. He was a student at Ohio State University in the 1959–1960 academic year where he was listed as an education major.

== Early career ==
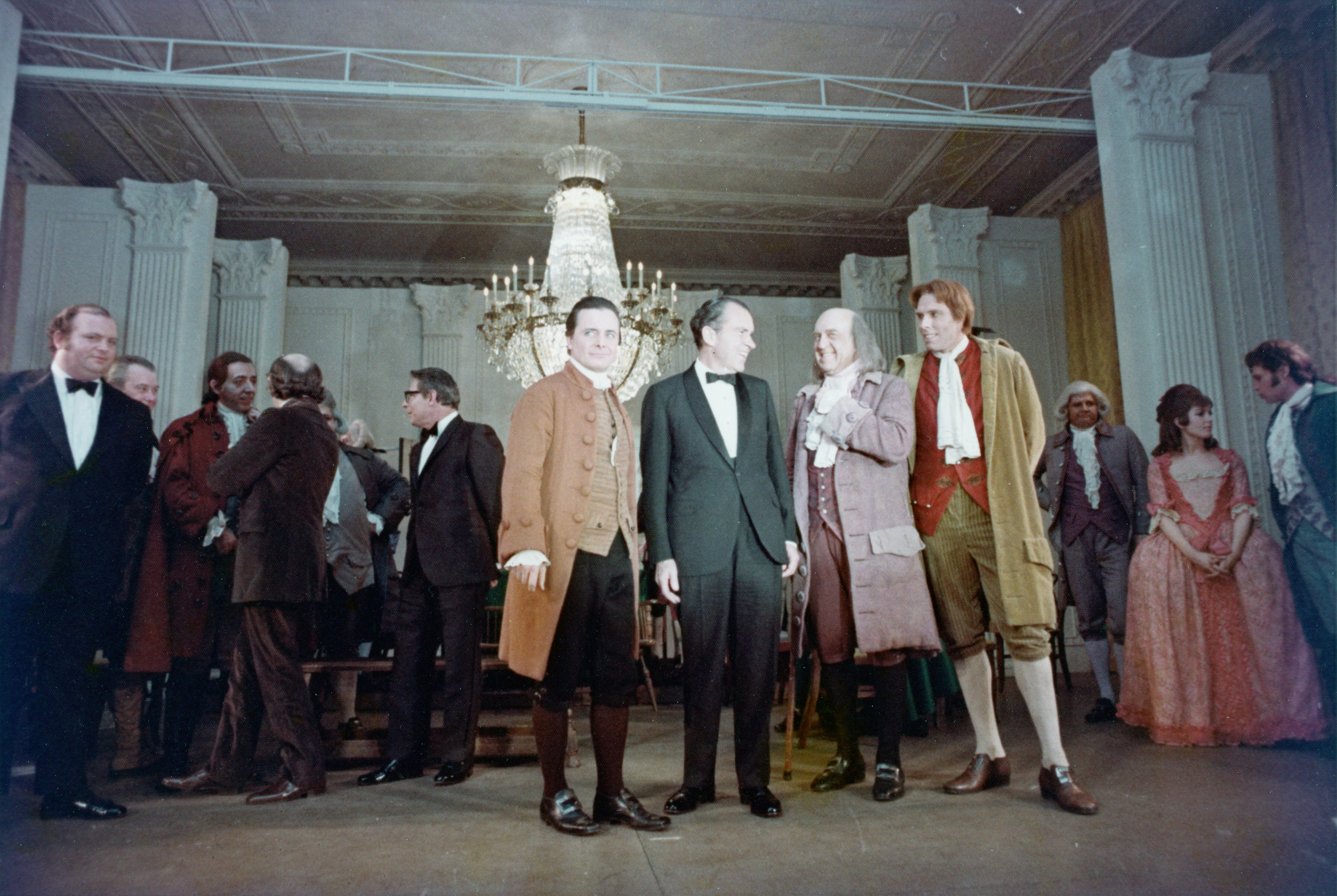
President Richard Nixon with the cast of 1776 after a performance – which excluded Jarvis' character at Nixon's request – in the East Room of the White House

Jarvis began his professional stage career as Rolf in the 1966 Music Fair Circuit Production of Rodgers and Hammerstein's The Sound of Music. He made his Broadway debut at the Billy Rose Theatre as Rabbit Holman in the original production of Terrence McNally's 1968 musical Here's Where I Belong.

In February 1969 he performed the role of the Courier in the world premiere of the musical 1776 at the National Theatre in Washington, D.C. In The Frederick News-Post's review of the premiere, the paper stated:

One of the most poignant moments comes when a young courier (Scott Jarvis) sings "Momma Look Sharp". He is describing himself as a soldier who is shot by the British up in New England and how he hears his mother coming towards him as he lays dying in the grass. Jarvis was more than moving.

In celebration of Presidents' Day in February 1969, 1776 was performed at the White House for Richard Nixon. Due to anti-war material in the play, White House officials requested that portions of Jarvis's role be cut for its White House presentation, specifically the part where the Courier delivers an anti-American Revolutionary War petition. In an interview in the Anderson Herald Bulletin Jarvis stated he was angered by the request because he was a "member of the Vietnam Moratorium".

1776 debuted on Broadway on March 16, 1969, at the 46th Street Theatre (now the Richard Rodgers Theatre). Originally the musical was presented with no intermission, but later Jarvis's song "Momma Look Sharp" became the emotional climax ending to Act 1. Theatre historian Gerald Bordman described it as the "most poignant moment" in the production. Jarvis sang the song at the 23rd Tony Awards, which was broadcast nationally on NBC on April 20, 1969. He later performed the song on The Great American Dream Machine in 1972 while in the national tour of 1776.

== Later career ==
In 1971 Jarvis starred in the original Off-Broadway musical revue Leaves of Grass, based on poems by Walt Whitman, at Theater Four on W. 55th St. His songs in the production included "There Is That in Me", "Do You Suppose", "Twenty-Eight Men", and "Dirge For Two Veterans". He later performed the role of Jerry/Daphne in the original 1972–1973 Broadway production of Jule Styne and Bob Merrill's Sugar; taking over the part from Robert Morse for part of its run while working as a standby. He later performed the role of Jerry/Daphne at the Casa Mañana Theatre in Dallas in 1974 with tenor Joseph Evans as Joe/"Josephine". He also performed the role of Jesus in Godspell at that theatre in 1974, and that same year starred in a production of the musical revue Jacques Brel is Alive and Well and Living in Paris at the Sombrero Playhouse in Phoenix, Arizona.

In 1975 Jarvis starred as Mordred in Lerner and Loewe's Camelot at the Los Angeles Civic Light Opera. That same year he returned to Casa Mañana to perform the role of Warren Smith in On a Clear Day You Can See Forever. In 1976 he performed in a production of Leonard Bernstein's Wonderful Town at the Music Circus in New Jersey. With the actors Jennifer Darling and Sam Weisman, he starred in the cabaret show Chapin in Los Angeles in 1977; a show which was centered around the music of Harry Chapin.

In 1986 he starred as Jacquot in the Goodspeed Musicals production of Carnival! In 1988 he portrayed Manfred in Sweet Charity at the Birmingham Theatre in Michigan. In 1989 he portrayed Ludlow Lowell in Pal Joey at the theatre of The Claridge Hotel in Atlantic City with Clint Holmes in the title role. He had previously starred at this latter theatre as Chip Salisbury in the Kander and Ebb musical Woman of the Year in 1987.

On television, Jarvis appeared as a guest actor in episodes of Starsky and Hutch, The Young and the Restless, and The Edge of Night.

== Death ==
Scott Jarvis died of AIDS at his home in New York City on February 26, 1990, at the age of 48.
