= Touw =

Touw is a surname. Notable people with the surname include:

- Daphne Touw (born 1970), Dutch field hockey player
- Harry Touw (1924–1994), Dutch comedian and actor
- Piet Touw (1917–1940), Dutch military policeman
- Pleuni Touw (born 1938), Dutch actress
