= Tan Crone =

Dutch classical pianist (1930–2009)

Tan Crone (born 's-Hertogenbosch, Netherlands, 2 March 1930; died Wassenaar, Netherlands, 17 January 2009) was a Dutch classical pianist. She performed and recorded both as a soloist and an accompanist.

She studied at the Amsterdam Conservatory, then with Nadia Boulanger in Paris, and finally in the United States at the New England Conservatory and Tanglewood.

She taught at the New England Conservatory, the Conservatorium Maastricht, and the Royal Conservatory of The Hague.

Crone often served as an accompanist for art songs, and worked with the singers Roberta Alexander, Benita Valente, Dorothy Dorow, Carolyn Watkinson, Rachel Ann Morgan, Yvonne Kenny, John Bröcheler, Maxim Karolik, and Sandra Schwarzhaupt. Her recording with John Bröcheler in 1979 won the "Preis der deutschen Schallplattenkritik". Crone has released 16 recordings, mostly as an accompanist.

She died in Wassenaar, Netherlands, on 17 January 2009.

== Discography ==
- 1958 – Maxim Karolik: Russian Art Songs (Unicorn)
- 1979 – John Bröcheler: Liederrecital, including Robert Schumann's Dichterliebe (CBS)
- 1983 – Carolyn Watkinson: Live at the Wigmore Hall (Bizet, Brahms, and Dvorak) (Etcetera)
- 1984 – Charles Ives: Songs (2 CDs) (Etcetera)
- 1985 – Richard Strauss: Lieder (Etcetera)
- 1986 – Leonard Bernstein: Songs (Etcetera)
- 1987 – Benjamin Britten: Music for Voice and Piano (Etcetera)
- 1987 – Giacomo Puccini: Songs and Rare Pieces (Etcetera)
- 1988 – Samuel Barber: Songs (Etcetera)
- 1988 – Roberto Gerhard: Schahrazada (Etcetera)
- 1988 – Dorothy Dorow Sings – Schoenberg: Cabaret Songs; Berg: Lieder; Webern: Seven Early Songs (Etcetera)
- 1991 – Mozart-Lieder (Live Concert from Carnegie Hall, New York), with Sandra Schwarzhaupt, soprano (Dino Classics)
- 1992 – John Ireland: English Songs (Etcetera)
- 1998 – Bernstein Dances: Ballet Revue by John Neumeier (Deutsche Grammophon)
- 1999 – Charles Ives: Lieder, with Veronica Lenz Kuhn (Thorofon)
- 2000 – Rondom Tan Crone: Zondagmiddagconcerten in de Amstelkerk (Brigadoon)
