= San Diego Civic Theatre =

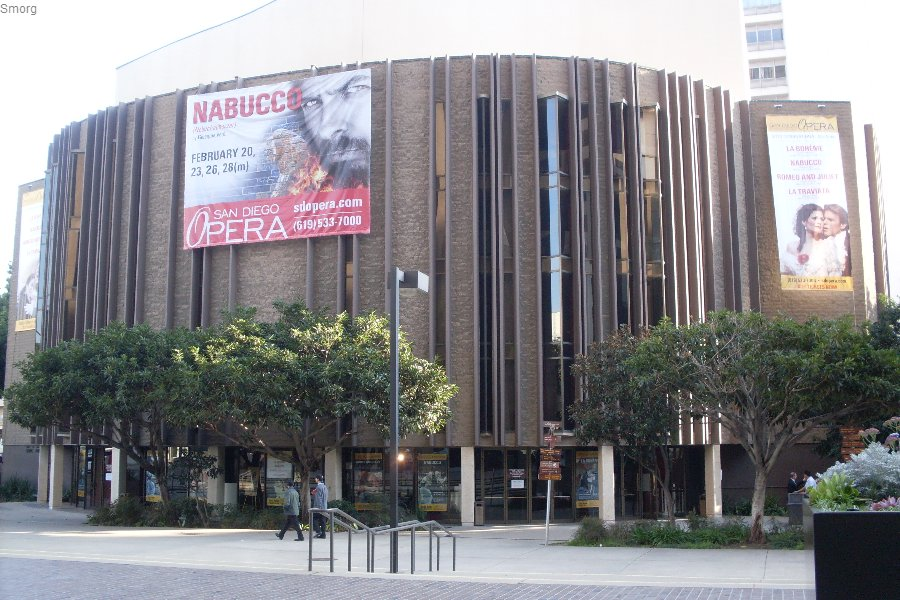
- Interactive map of San Diego Civic Theatre
- Address: 1100 Third Avenue; San Diego, California; United States
- Coordinates: 32°43′02″N 117°09′45″W
- Owner: City of San Diego
- Capacity: 2,967
- Current use: Performing arts venue
- Public transit: Civic Center station

Construction
- Opened: 1965

Website
- sandiegotheatres.org

The San Diego Civic Theatre is a performing arts venue in downtown San Diego, California. It opened in 1965. It is the performing home of the San Diego Opera and hosts other entertainment events such as concerts and musicals.
