= Piet Touw =

- Born: Petrus Dirk Touw; 11 July 1917; Groningen, Netherlands
- Died: 10 May 1940 (aged 22); Buggenum, Netherlands
- Burial place: Maasniel
- Military career
- Allegiance: Netherlands
- Branch: Korps Politietroepen (Military Police Corps)
- Rank: Corporal
- Battles: German invasion of the Netherlands
- Awards: Bronze Cross (posthumously)

Petrus Dirk "Piet" Touw (11 July 1917 – 10 May 1940) was a Dutch corporal in the Korps Politietroepen, a military police unit. He is considered to be the first Dutch military casualty during the German invasion of the Netherlands in 1940 at the outset of the Second World War. Touw was killed during an armed confrontation with German soldiers at the Buggenum railway bridge in the early morning of 10 May 1940.

== Biography ==
Touw was born in Groningen to railway engineer Dirk Touw and Petronella Cornelia Prinsen. He remained unmarried.

In 1940, he served as a corporal in the Korps Politietroepen, a unit responsible for guarding critical infrastructure. A few weeks before the German invasion, Touw wrote a letter to his parents expressing concern about the growing tensions in Europe. In the letter, he stated that he believed Dutch neutrality was no longer sustainable and that he was prepared for a potential armed conflict.

On the night of 9 to 10 May 1940, Touw was stationed with two fellow corporals at the railway bridge over the Meuse River near Roermond. Their detachment was commanded by a sergeant, and a staff member of the Dutch Railways was also present, responsible for the safety of railway traffic.

In the hours leading up to the invasion, unrest had already broken out around Roermond. Explosives were used to fell trees along access roads to prepare defensive lines. Fighting occurred in the city center between Dutch troops and German infiltrators targeting the nearby road bridge over the Meuse. This Battle of Roermond is considered the first armed confrontation on Dutch soil during World War II.

As a precaution, the sergeant ordered the railway bridge gates closed, halting train traffic. Shortly afterward, at around 03:07, a group of about fifteen men approached the bridge along the railway embankment. Dressed in overalls and armed with pickaxes, they claimed to be railway workers and presented a Dutch Railways ID. However, the railway employee grew suspicious: the pickaxes differed from the usual models, and the stated location '413' was unknown to him.

The men turned out to be German soldiers attempting to seize the bridge. When they realized they had been exposed, they opened fire. Corporal Piet Touw was hit in the chest and died on the spot. He was the first Dutch military fatality of the German invasion. Touw was buried in Maasniel.

== Honours ==
- In 1946, Touw was posthumously awarded the Bronze Cross for "displaying great courage in preventing an enemy attempt to seize the guard post on the eastern side of the railway bridge at Buggenum on 10 May 1940, during which he was killed" (Royal Decree 9 May 1946, No. 6).
- His name is inscribed on the Honor Roll of the Fallen 1940–1945.
