= La Loca (opera) =

Opera by Gian Carlo Menotti

- Opera by Gian Carlo Menotti
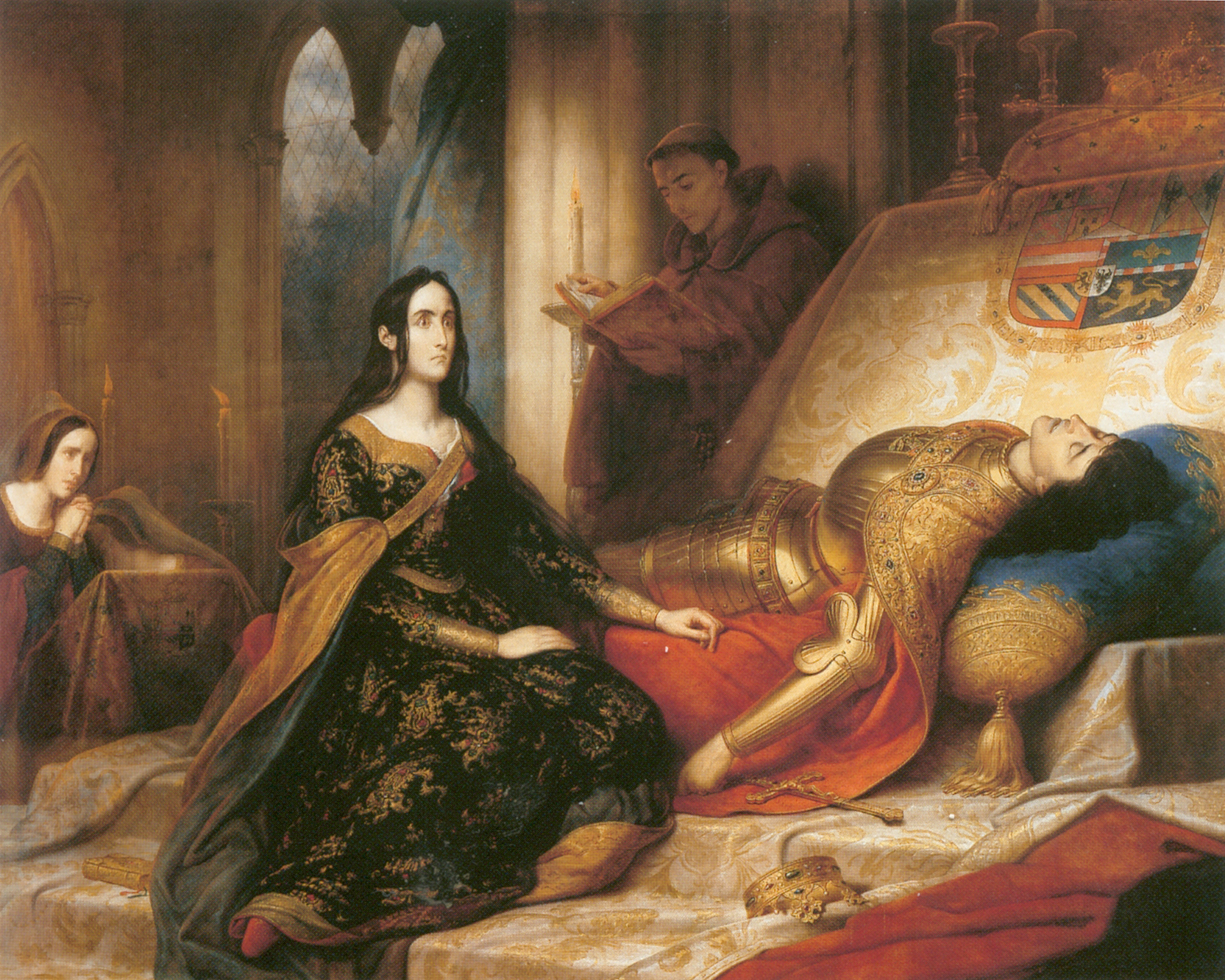
- Juana la Loca, 1836 painting by Charles de Steuben
- Translation: The Madwoman
- Other title: Juana la Loca
- Librettist: Gian Carlo Menotti
- Language: English
- Based on: Joanna of Castile
- Premiere: June 3, 1979; San Diego Opera

La Loca (The Madwoman), also known as Juana la Loca (Crazy Joanna), is an opera by Gian Carlo Menotti, composed in 1979. It is a romantic drama about the life of Joanna of Castile (1479–1555). It was written as a vehicle for soprano Beverly Sills and received its premiere on June 3, 1979, at the San Diego Opera, followed by the New York City Opera. Critical response was largely negative, so Menotti completely reworked it. The revised version premiered in 1982 at the Festival of Two Worlds in Spoleto, Italy. The American premiere of the revised version took place at the Spoleto Festival USA in Charleston, South Carolina, on June 1, 1984.

== Composition history ==
La Loca was Menotti's tenth opera. He wrote the libretto as well as the music, as was his custom. It was written in English, like most of Menotti's work. It consists of three acts with seven scenes. The opera was barely completed in time for the premiere, with revisions being made as late as the dress rehearsal; "pages with handwritten notes would be rushed from (Menotti's) hotel suite to the theater with the ink still wet on the pages."

The opera was written in honor of Sills' 50th birthday. It was the first work written specifically for her and was her last new role, as she retired the following year. It was commissioned by two West Coast opera lovers, Cyril Magnin and Lawrence P. Deutsch, at the urging of then-San Diego Opera director Tito Capobianco. Capobianco directed the production and the designer was Mario Vanarelli.

The role of Juana is a soprano, written for and premiered by Sills. Juana's three male counterparts – her husband Philip, father Fernando, and son Carlos – are all sung by the same baritone.

== Historical background ==
Juana, born November 6, 1479, was the daughter of Isabella I of Castile and Ferdinand II of Aragon. On October 20, 1496, at the age of 16, she married Philip, son of Maximilian I, Holy Roman Emperor. He was known as Philip the Handsome or Philip the Fair. In their nine years of marriage she gave birth to six children. Due to deaths in the family she became the heiress to the two Spanish kingdoms. When her mother died in 1504 she became Queen of Castile and Philip became King Philip I of Castile. Her father Ferdinand of Aragon, attempting to keep control of Castile, argued that Juana was mentally unstable and was named her guardian. Her husband Philip resisted Ferdinand's maneuvering. In 1506 Philip and Ferdinand formally agreed that Juana should be excluded from government. A few months later Philip died of typhoid fever. She attempted to retain power as Queen of Castile but was unable to secure her position, and power was handed over to her father Ferdinand. She refused to sign the abdication papers, so she remained as the titular queen, but was confined to a nunnery. All authority was exercised in her name by her father, and after his death, by her son and heir Charles, who later became Charles V, Holy Roman Emperor. She was kept in confinement at the Convent of Santa Clara at Tordesillas, where she died at the age of 75.

== Synopsis ==
=== Act 1 ===
Juana and Philip, entering into their arranged marriage, dismiss their attendants and sing a love duet. Years later Juana is still passionately in love with Philip, but he engages in numerous infidelities and tries to get her to sign her claim to the Spanish throne over to him. However, Philip dies.

=== Act 2 ===
While taking Philip's body back to Spain, Juana opens the coffin and sings to him. When she arrives in Spain, her father Fernando attempts to get her to sign over the kingdom. When she refuses, he confines her to a convent and takes away all her children except her daughter Catalina.

=== Act 3 ===
Juana's father has died, and now her son Carlos is demanding that she sign abdication papers. When she refuses, he takes Catalina away and orders that the window of her cell be boarded up. In the final scene she is dying after 46 years of confinement. The priest Miguel, who had once been a knight in attendance on her, assures her that God is a faithful bridegroom.

== Roles ==
Roles, voice types, premiere cast
Role	Voice type	Premiere cast, June 3, 1979 Conductor: Calvin Simmons
Juana	soprano	Beverly Sills
Felipe, Fernando, Carlos	baritone	John Bröcheler
Bishop Ximenes	bass-baritone	Robert Hale
Doña Manuela	mezzo-soprano	Susanne Marsee
Nurse	mezzo-soprano	Jane Westbrook
Miguel de Ferrara	tenor	Joseph Evans
Chaplain	tenor	Vincent Russo
Marques de Denia	bass	Carlos Chausson
Catalina	soprano	Nancy Coulson
Ladies in Waiting	soprano, contralto	Marcia Cope, Martha Jane Howe
