= Tito Capobianco =

Argentine American stage director and general manager

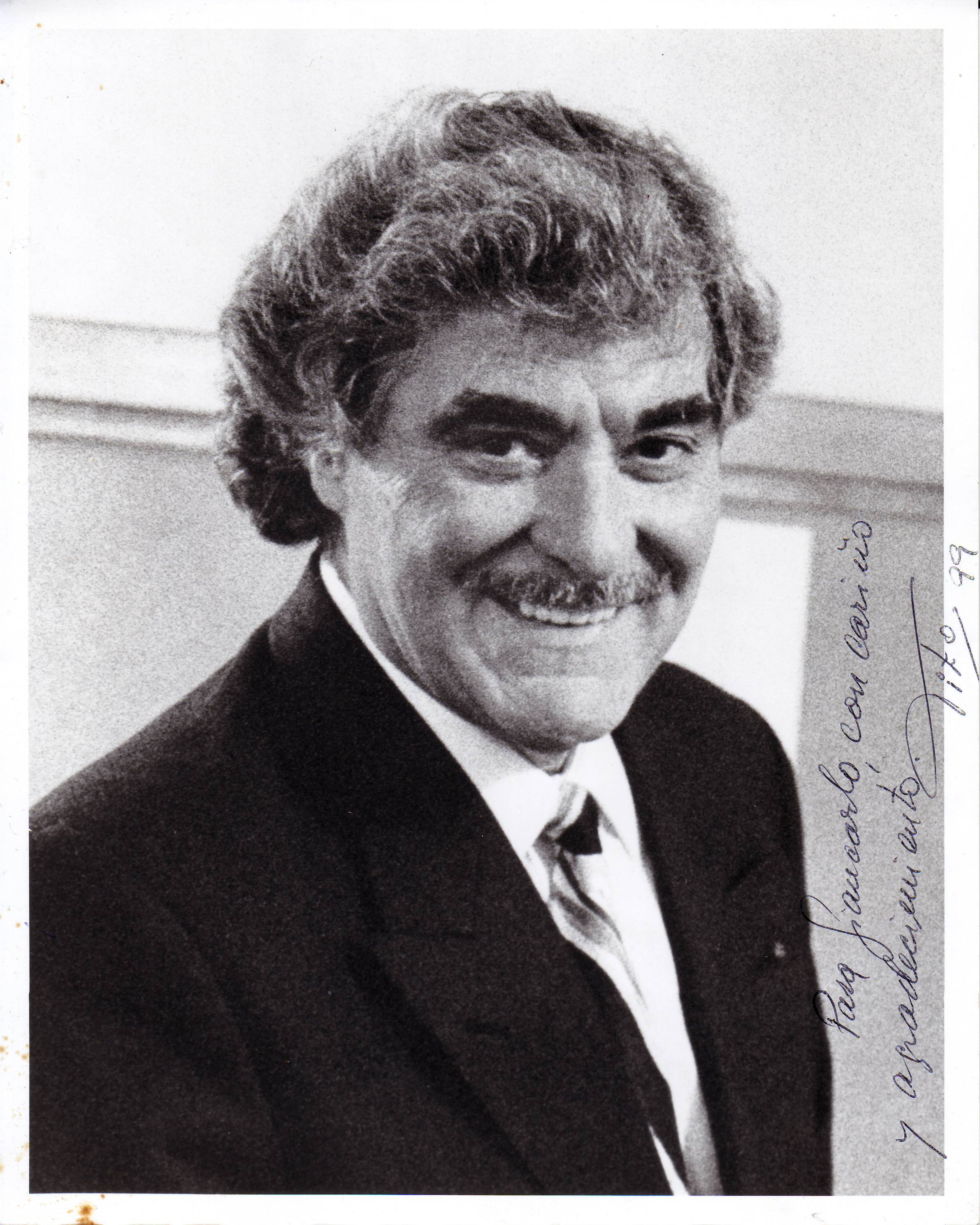
Tito Capobianco, 1999

Tito Capobianco (28 August 1931 – 8 September 2018) was an Argentine American stage director and general manager of several opera companies.

== Early life ==
Capobianco was born in La Plata, Argentina. His parents had fled from Fascist Italy in 1928 and settled in La Plata, near Buenos Aires. His parents were both musical; his father played trumpet in the local symphonic band. He grew up speaking Italian (a later advantage in the opera world) and attended a bilingual Spanish-Italian school until 4th grade. He continued his musical education at Hermanos Maristas de la Enseñanza and St. Joseph's College. He then qualified for the chorus and opera school of the Teatro Argentino de La Plata, where he graduated from being a super to singing baritone roles; he also learned stage managing.

== Career ==
He made his official debut with Aida at the Teatro Argentino de La Plata in 1953, then worked at the Teatro Colón in Buenos Aires. His American debut came in 1962 with a production of Tosca at the Philadelphia Grand Opera Company with Birgit Nilsson in the title role.

Capobianco was artistic director of the Cincinnati Opera Festival (1961 to 1965) and the Cincinnati Opera (1962 to 1965) before moving to the New York City Opera in 1965 with Les contes d'Hoffmann which included Beverly Sills and Norman Treigle in the cast. He later held posts at the San Diego Opera and the Pittsburgh Opera.

He has been described as difficult to work with and who "admits his intense management and directing style was at times hard on his singers and staff: 'I am obsessed with something that does not exist: perfection.'" Capobianco seemed to relish the control which the post of general director gave to him: "The impetus of general director was the assurance to me that I could do whatever I wanted. There will be nobody except the board to stop me. I don't believe in democracy in the arts. You don't use four persons to do the same painting."

In 2017, his autobiography Tito's Way: The Art of Producing Opera was published. He also served on the faculty of the Academy of Vocal Arts in Philadelphia where he directed student opera productions.

=== New York City Opera, 1966 to 1976 ===
Capobianco became one of the City Opera's important directors, mounting ground-breaking productions including Alberto Ginastera's Don Rodrigo (with Plácido Domingo); Giulio Cesare (which brought Sills to preëminence in 1966); Le Coq d'Or; Manon; Mefistofele (with Norman Treigle in his greatest role); Lucia di Lammermoor; Les contes d'Hoffmann; I puritani; Il turco in Italia; and the world premiere of Menotti's La Loca.

In addition, he produced the now-famous "The Three Queens" operas of Donizetti, Roberto Devereux (1970), Maria Stuarda (1972), and Anna Bolena, all of which starred Sills. He established a solid working relationship with Sills, and the feeling was mutual. "I can ask her to try anything onstage," said Capobianco, who directed most of her successes at City Opera and whom Sills regarded as "her" director." Capobianco commented on some of the features which allowed the trio of operas to be presented: "It was a golden era ... We had singers who could act. It was total theatre; drama. It was just a fantastic moment."

In a statement after his death, Opera News described him as a "groundbreaking director during New York City Opera's heyday" and as "one of the most influential directors in opera during the 1960s and '70s".

=== San Diego Opera, 1976 to 1983 ===
He was general director of the San Diego Opera from 1976 to 1983. During his tenure he "expanded the season to six productions, featuring renowned superstars such as Joan Sutherland, Luciano Pavarotti and Beverly Sills." Because of his friendship with Sills, in 1980 the San Diego Opera presented her final performance, a production of Die Fledermaus, in which Sutherland and Sills took turns singing the roles of Rosalinde and Adele.

One of the features of his tenure at the company was the introduction of a Verdi Festival, with two operas presented each summer, one generally a late composition, the other an early work from the composer's "galley years". Beginning in 1976 with Otello as part of the regular season, the festival continued in the summers of 1978 with Verdi's Requiem and Aida; in 1979 with I Lombardi; in 1980 with Il trovatore and Giovanna d'Arco; in 1981 with Un giorno di regno plus the Requiem; and 1982 saw stagings of Il corsaro and Un ballo in maschera. Capobianco left the company in 1983, but his successor was able to present I masnadieri (with Sutherland) along with Simon Boccanegra while the festival concept ended in March 1985 with Oberto (with Ferruccio Furlanetto and Susanne Marsee).

=== Pittsburgh Opera, 1983 to 2000 ===
Capobianco arrived in Pittsburgh in 1983, taking over the Pittsburgh Opera, which had been in operating under temporary directors for years since the 1977 death of its previous general director. Capobianco would stay as the general director of the Opera until 1998. He spent two additional years as the Opera's artistic director, before retiring in 2000.

Capobianco was credited both with improving the artistic reputation of the Opera and fixing the Opera's financial instability with his fundraising abilities. Upon his retirement, an article in the Pittsburgh Post-Gazette summarized his 17-year tenure at the Pittsburgh Opera by describing him as "armed with a towering personality, glittering charisma and determined artistic vision, he's ruled the Pittsburgh Opera – sometimes, say his critics, with an iron fist."

=== Metropolitan Opera ===
Capobianco made his Metropolitan Opera debut in 1978 with Thaïs, featuring Sills, and returned to that theatre for Simon Boccanegra in 1984, with Sherrill Milnes in the title role.

== Videography ==
- Donizetti: Roberto Devereux (Sills, Marsee, J. Alexander, Fredricks; Rudel, 1975) [live] VAI
- Verdi: La traviata (Sills, H. Price, Fredricks; Rudel, 1976) [live] VAI
- Massenet: Manon (Sills, H. Price, Fredricks, Ramey; Rudel, 1977) [live] Paramount
- Verdi: Simon Boccanegra (Tomowa-Sintow, Milnes, Plishka; Levine, 1984) [live] Deutsche Grammophon
