= National Association of Teachers of Singing =

Professional organization

- Formation: 1944
- Type: Professional association
- Purpose: Promote quality and professionalism in singing pedagogy
- Headquarters: Jacksonville, Florida, U.S.
- Region served: International (primarily U.S. and Canada)
- Members: Vocal teachers, music educators, voice professionals
- Official language: English
- Affiliations: International Council for Music Education (pending verification)
- Website: www.nats.org

The National Association of Teachers of Singing (NATS) is a professional organization for singing teachers, and it is the largest association of its kind in the world. There are more than 6,500 members, mostly from the United States. Additional members are from Canada and over twenty-five other countries around the world including: Australia, Austria, Brazil, China, Costa Rica, Denmark, Egypt, France, Germany, Iceland, Italy, Japan, Jordan, Korea, Malaysia, Mexico, Netherlands, New Zealand, Singapore, South Africa, South Korea, Spain, Switzerland, Taiwan, United Arab Emirates, and the United Kingdom.

== History ==
NATS was founded in 1944 in Cincinnati, Ohio. As an outgrowth of the development of the Music Teachers National Association (MTNA) in the early years of the twentieth century, a group of singing teachers incorporated the association in the state of New York on November 27, 1906. The first annual meeting of the new organization was held on January 7, 1908 at Steinway Hall in New York City. In 1917 it changed its name to the New York Singing Teachers' Association (NYSTA). In 1922 the Los Angeles Guild of Teachers of Singing was chartered, and two years later it published a Code of Ethics that was later embraced by the national organization. The Chicago Council of Teachers of Singing was organized in 1930.

These local organizations began the process of becoming a national organization in the early 1940s. During the 1944 MTNA Convention, members of the various groups met on Thursday, March 23, 1944, at the Netherland Plaza Hotel in Cincinnati to create the National Association of Teachers of Singing. Bass and University of North Texas professor Edward A. Baird served as president of the organization from 1985–1987.

== Organization ==
The association has a national office in Jacksonville, Florida, and is governed by a national Board of Directors. Members belong to one of 14 national Regions, depending upon which state they reside in:

- Cal-Western Region
- Central Region
- Eastern Region
- Great Lakes Region
- Intermountain Region
- Mid-Atlantic Region
- Mid-South Region
- New England Region
- North Central Region
- Northwestern Region
- Southeastern Region
- Southern Region
- Texoma Region
- West Central Region

A Regional Governor serves as the head of each national region. Individual states and localities also have independent chapters, with State Governors and chapter presidents leading them.

Members are invited to attend a National Conference (convention) every two years, sponsored by a different city and Region each time. Recent conventions include:

- 2016, Chicago, Illinois
- 2014, Boston, Massachusetts
- 2012, Orlando, Florida
- 2010, Salt Lake City, Utah
- 2008, Nashville, Tennessee
- 2006, Minneapolis, Minnesota
- 2004, New Orleans, Louisiana
- 2002, San Diego, California

== Code of Ethics ==
NATS members are charged with honoring a national Code of Ethics. This list of proper behaviors for voice teachers was established to encourage honesty and professional standards. The current Code, written in 2006, is divided into three sections:

1. Personal Ethical Standards
2. Ethical Standards Relating to Students
3. Ethical Standards Relating to Colleagues

== Competition ==
Students of NATS members have access to one of the organization's most widely recognized activities: Student Auditions. They also have the opportunity, along with members, to compete at a national level through the National Association of Teachers of Singing Artist Awards (NATSAA). The national Artist Award program began in 1955 as the Singer of the Year Scholarship Auditions.

The NATSAA competition is designed to assist singers prepared to launch a professional career, and to that end substantial monetary and performance prizes are offered. The competition takes place every other year, in conjunction with NATS Conferences. Preliminary competitions are held regionally, and semifinals/finals take place at the NATS Conference. Throughout its history the purpose of this [NATSAA] competition has been to select, through a series of elimination rounds on the district, regional, and national levels, singers whose artistry indicates that they are ready for a professional career and to encourage them toward that goal with a cash prize and the opportunity for performance engagements.
