= André Bon =

French composer (1946–2026)

André Bon (17 August 1946 – 20 September 2026) was a French composer. A student of Olivier Messiaen, he composed over 50 works including several chamber operas. He was Professor of Composition at the Argenteuil Conservatory.

== Life and career ==
André Bon was born in Lille on 17 August 1946. He studied music and composition at the Conservatoire National Supérieur de Musique et de Danse de Paris. Following his graduation from the Conservatoire, he won the Prix de Rome, and spent two years of further study at the French Academy in Rome.

In succeeding years, his work in composition has been supported by several further fellowships and prizes, including the Lili Boulanger Prize (1975), the Hervé Dugardin Prize from the Société des auteurs, compositeurs et éditeurs de musique (SACEM) (1979), SACEM's Composers Prize (1992), and the Monbinne Prize of the Académie des Beaux-Arts (1995).

Awards for his operas include the Award for the Best French Creation granted by the French Society of Drama and Music Critics (1987) and the New Talents Award of the French authors' society, the Société des Auteurs et Compositeurs Dramatiques (SACD), in 1988 for Le Rapt de Persephone (The Rape of Persephone); the Samuel Rousseau Prize from the Académie des Beaux-Arts (1993) and the Wolf-Ebermann Prize of the International Theatre Institute in Munich (1996) for his opera La jeune fille au livre (Girl with a Book); and Prix Musique 2009 from SACD Iq & Ox.

In addition to his professorships at Argenteuil and the American Conservatory of Fontainebleau, Bon has taught 20th-century musicology at the University of Aix-en-Provence and has been a composer-in-residence at the Atlantic Center for the Arts in Florida and at the Henry Clews Foundation (Château de La Napoule, Cannes).

Bon died on 20 September 2026, at the age of 80.

== Works ==
=== Orchestral ===
Convergence (1973)
For oboe d'amore and orchestra: 2 flutes, 2 oboes, 2 clarinets, 2 bassoons, 4 horns, 3 trumpets, 3 trombones, 1 tuba, harp, guitar, piano, 5 percussionists, strings. 24 min, Paris 1974, unpublished
Emergence (1980)
For youth orchestra, commissioned by the Minister of Culture: 3 flutes, 3 clarinets, alto saxophone, 2 trumpets, 1 trombone, piano, 1 percussionist, strings. 12 min, Bagnols-sur-Cèze 1981, Edition BMG collection Amphion
Fresques (2000)
For grand orchestra, commissioned by Radio France: 3 flutes, 3 oboes, 3 clarinets, 3 bassoons, 4 horns, 3 trumpets, 3 trombones, 1 tuba, harpsichord, harp, piano, cimbalom, 5 percussionists, strings. 35 min, Paris 2001, Edition Radio France
Ode (1979)
For Orchestra Mozart, commissioned by the Minister of Culture: 13 min, Lille 1980, Edition BMG collection Amphion
Ode II (1985)
For Orchestra Haydn, commissioned by Ensemble Alternance: 2 flutes, 2 oboes, 1 bassoon, 2 horns, timpani if desired, 4 first violins, 3 second violins, 2 violas, 2 cellos, 1 double bass. 13 min, Lisbon 1986, Edition BMG collection Amphion
Poursuite (1975)
For grand orchestra: 4 flutes, 4 oboes, 4 clarinets, 4 bassoons, 6 horns, 4 trumpets, 3 trombones, 1 tuba, harp, 5 percussionists, strings. 26 min, Rome 1976, Edition BMG collection Amphion

=== Ensemble ===
Andare
For flute, clarinet, guitar, harp, piano, percussion, violin, viola, and cello. Commissioned by Radio France. 13 min, Paris 1979, Edition LEMOINE collection Jobert.
Carnets (1990)
For six instruments ad libitum and piano, four hands. Commissioned by the Minister of Culture. 13 min, Edition FUZEAU.
Concertare
For twelve string players: 3 first violins, 3 second violins, 3 violas, 2 cellos, 1 double bass. 13 min, Rome 1976, Edition LEMOINE collection.
La Création (2000)
Eight pieces for children's orchestra. Percussion-based. Commissioned by the city of Blanc-Mesnil. 13 min, Blanc-Mesnil 2001, unpublished.
Ricercare
For seventeen instruments: flute, cor anglais, 2 clarinets, 1 bass clarinet, alto saxophone, horn, trumpet, trombone, tuba, piano, harp, percussion, viola, 2 cellos, double bass. 13 min, Zagreb Biennial 1977, Edition LEMOINE collection Jobert.
Travelling (1989)
For eleven instruments: wind quintet, string quintet, harp. Commissioned by the Minister of Culture. 13 min, Paris 1989, Edition BMG collection Amphion.

=== Chamber ===
Canzone (1974)
For trombone. Commissioned by the Minister of Culture. 7 min, Paris Théâtre de la Ville 1975, Edition BMG collection Amphion.
Four études for three trombones (1996)
Commissioned by Musicatreize. 6 min, Marseille 1996, Edition BMG collection Amphion.
Seven études for Émergence (1981)
Commissioned by the Minister of Culture. Each is for a different instrument: 1) flute, 2) clarinet, 3) alto saxophone, 4) trumpet, 5) piano, 6) violin, 7) cello. 2 min each, total 14 min, Nanterre 1996, Edition BMG collection Amphion.
Iniziare (2007)
For two alto saxophones. Commissioned by Saxetera. 5 min, Dreux 2008, Edition Billaudot.
Invention (1999)
For piano. 3 min, unpublished.
Polyptyque, volet 1 (1997)
For oboe and cello. Commissioned by Cefedem-Sud. 5 min, Marseille 1997, Edition BMG Collection Amphion.
Polyptyque, volet 2 (1997)
For bassoon and viola. Commissioned by Cefedem-Sud. 8 min 30 sec, Marseille 1997, unpublished.
Suonare I (1982)
For harpsichord and piano. Commissioned by Maryse and Seth Carlin. 6 min 30 sec, St Louis, Missouri USA 1982, Edition BMG Collection Amphion.
Suonare II (1982)
For harp and cimbalom. Commissioned by Ensemble SIC and the Festival of Auch. Auch 1996.
Suonare III (1988)
For harp, harpsichord, cimbalom and piano. Commissioned by Radio France. 11 min, Paris 1991, Edition BMG collection Amphion.
Suonare IV (2003)
For harp and harpsichord. Commissioned by CNSM de Lyon. 4 min, Edition Fuzeau.
Winter in Kyoto (2000)
For shakuhachi (or flute) and cello. 11 min, Paris 2003, unpublished.

=== Operas ===
Adam et Eve (1971)
Chamber opera for one actor, two singers and six instrumentalists (trombone, guitar, piano, organ, and two percussionists). Based on Le Jeu d'Adam, an anonymous medieval work. 22 min, Paris 1972, unpublished.
Iq et Ox (2009)
Opera for three adult singers, six child singers, and children's choir. Libretto by Jean-Claude Grumberg. Commissioned by the Minister of Culture. For flute, oboe, clarinet, 2 horns, trombone, piano, percussion, violin, viola, cello, double bass. 66 min, Metz 2009, Prix Musique de la SACD, Editions Musicales de la Salamandre.
La jeune fille au livre (1993)
Opera for soloists, choir and orchestra. Libretto by Michel Beretti. Commissioned by the Minister of Culture, the Beaumarchais Foundation, and the Henry Clews Foundation. For 2 flutes, 2 oboes, 2 clarinets, 2 bassoons, 3 horns, 2 trumpets, 2 trombones, 1 tuba, piano, 2 percussionists, and strings. 66 min, Film INA, La SEPT/ARTE, Radio-France, Prix Samuel Rousseau de l'Académie des Beaux-Arts, Wolf-Ebermann-Preis des Internationalen Theaterinstituts, Edition BMG collection Durand.
Le Rapt de Persephone (1986)
Opera for soloists, choir and orchestra. Libretto by Dominique Fernandez. Commissioned by the Minister of Culture. For 3 flutes, 3 oboes, 3 clarinets, 3 bassoons, 4 horns, 3 trumpets, 3 trombones, 1 tuba, piano, harp, 4 percussionists, and strings. 55 min, Nancy 1987, Prix de la « meilleure création française » décerné par la Critique Dramatique et Musicale, Prix des Talents nouveaux de la SACD, Edition Choudens.
Tobias (1996)
Chamber opera for 5 soloists and eight instrumentalists (1 trumpet, 2 trombones, 1 percussionist, 2 violas, and 1 double bass). Libretto by Michel Beretti. Commissioned by the Minister of Culture. 44 min, Caen 1996, unpublished.

=== Other vocal music ===
L'Amour de loin (2000)
Four poems by Jacqueline Risset, set for a cappella choir. Commissioned by Musique et Danse en Lorraine. 12 min, Bar-le-Duc 2000, Edition FUZEAU (French-English bilingual edition)
La Cantate des oiseaux (2008)
Cantata for two soloists and children's choir. Words by Farîd-ud-dîn'Attar. Commissioned by the city of Argenteuil. For 12 flutes, 3 clarinets, 2 saxophones, 1 trombone, percussionist, accordion, and piano. 13 min, Argenteuil 2008, unpublished.
Chants espaces 1: Aujourd'hui et demain
For baritone, shakuhachi (or alto flute) and cello. 7 min, Tokyo 1974, unpublished.
Chants espaces 2: Enchaînement
For contralto, viola d'amore (or viola) and piano. 8 min, Paris 1977, unpublished.
Chants espaces 3: D'amour du dire
Cantata for contralto, baritone, alto flute, viola, cello and piano. Poem by Dominique Buisset. 13 min, Kyoto 1999, unpublished.
D'un chant perdu (1983)
For soprano and orchestra. Poem by Marceline Desbordes-Valmore. Commissioned by the Minister of Culture. For 4 flutes, 3 oboes, 4 clarinets, 3 bassoons, 4 horns, 3 trumpets, 3 trombones, 1 tuba, 2 saxophones, harp, piano, 5 percussionists, strings. 15 min, Metz 1985, Edition BMG collection Amphion.
Deux paroles de Prévert (1966)
Two songs based on poems by Jacques Prévert, with piano accompaniment. Unpublished.
Enquêtes (1980)
For choir and 13 instruments: 3 B-flat clarinets, 1 alto saxophone, 1 tenor saxophone, 2 trumpets, 2 trombones, piano, 2 percussionists, double bass. Poem by Eugène Guillevic. Commissioned by the Minister of Culture. 22 min, Paris 1983, Edition BM, collection Amphion.
Gala (2009)
For mezzo-soprano and piano. Based on a letter from Gala Dalí to Paul Éluard. Commissioned by Compagnie Poursuite. 13 min, unpublished.
Les Guerres du poète (2000)
Three melodies for sonnets by Pierre de Ronsard. 11 min, unpublished.
La Morte di Ulisse (2004)
Cantata for bass voice and ensemble, based on Dante's Inferno. Commissioned by the Minister of Culture. For oboe d'amore, bassoon, violin, cello, organ, harpsichord, and theorbo. 16 min, Sens 2004, unpublished.
Que nous deux sur la terre (1995)
For baritone and piano. Based on a letter from Paul Éluard to Gala Dalí. Commissioned by the Festival of Saint-Denis. 13 min, Saint-Denis 1995, unpublished.
Le retour du soleil (1981)
For soprano and orchestra. Three poems by Louise Labé. Commissioned by Radio France. For 3 flutes, 3 oboes, 3 clarinets, 3 bassoons, 4 horns, 3 trumpets, 3 trombones, 1 tuba, 2 harps, 4 percussionists, strings. 16 min, Paris 1983, Edition Radio France.
Sonnet (1984)
For soprano and 6 instrumentalists. Poem by Louise Labé. For flute, clarinet, piano, cimbalom, violin and cello. 6 min 30 sec, Strasbourg 1986, Edition BMG collection Amphion.
Uki (2004)
Two songs for children's choir, with 12 instrumentalists. Poems by Yasushi Inoue and Raymond Queneau. Commissioned by Musique et Danse en Lorraine, CIM de Bar-le-Duc, CEFEDEM de Lorraine. For 4 flutes, 1 oboes, 1 clarinet, 1 soprano saxophone, 1 tenor saxophone, 1 baritone saxophone, 2 violins, 1 cello. 13 min, Bar-le-Duc 2004, unpublished.
Les vallées du cinéma (1991)
Cantata for 4 soloists, chamber choir, and orchestra. Commissioned for Orchestra Mozart by the Minister of Culture. Texts by Marguerite Duras, Louise Labé, and Homer. For 2 flutes, 2 oboes, 2 clarinets, 2 bassoons, 2 horns, strings. 40 min, Paris 1991, Prix SACEM for best French work, Edition BMG collection Durand.
La Voix (1995)
Madrigal for 5 voices, based on a poem by Francisco Ruiz de Infante. Commissioned by Musicatreize. 10 min, Marseille 1996, Edition BMG collection Amphion.

=== Electroacoustic ===
L'image des sons (1973)
Created in the studio of GRM Radio France, Paris 1973, unpublished.
Histoire (1977)
Created in the studio of the University of East Anglia, Norwich. Premiere: Paris 1980. Unpublished.
