= Ian Campbell (opera director) =

Ian David Campbell (21 December 1945 (age 80)) is an Australian-born opera singer, stage director, administrator, radio broadcaster and writer. He was the general director and artistic director of San Diego Opera from 1983 until 2014. In the 1960s and 1970s he sang opera as a tenor, then moved into opera management.

In March 2014 he told the San Diego Opera's board of directors that the company should shut down, saying its finances made continued operation no longer viable. The board of directors concurred in a 33–1 vote. There had been no warning that he was about to propose this, and the decision was controversial. Two months later, under new board leadership, the decision to close was rescinded and his employment was terminated.

== Early life and education ==
Campbell was born in Brisbane, grew up in Townsville, and graduated from the University of Sydney, holding the designations of Fellow, and Certified Professional Manager, from the Australian Institute of Management. He studied singing with Godfrey Stirling, a former tenor with the Carl Rosa Opera Company in the United Kingdom.

== Opera career ==
He began his operatic career in 1967 as a principal character tenor with the Australian Opera (now known as Opera Australia), and retired from singing in 1974 following the first season in the Sydney Opera House. He moved into management as Senior Music Officer for the Australia Council from 1974 to 1976, and later became general manager of the State Opera of South Australia in Adelaide from 1976 to 1982.

Among the operas he programmed in Adelaide were the Australian premieres of Tippett's Midsummer Marriage, Britten's Death in Venice, Musgrave's A Christmas Carol and Janáček's The Makropulos Case. He toured the company to the Perth Festival twice, to Hobart, and to the Sydney Opera House where Nicholas Maw's One Man Show was presented as part of Opera Australia's season.

In 1982 he joined the Metropolitan Opera in New York as assistant artistic administrator before becoming the general and artistic director and CEO of San Diego Opera in 1983.

In San Diego he introduced a recital and concert series in 1986 which included Renata Scotto, Kiri Te Kanawa, Hans Peter Blochwitz, Cecilia Bartoli, Joan Sutherland, Dmitri Hvorostovsky, Jose Carreras, Tatiana Troyanos, Luciano Pavarotti, Hermann Prey, Plácido Domingo, Ewa Podles, Galina Gorchakova, Simon Estes and Paata Burchuladze, among others.

His North American Voices Project launched in 1994 included Daniel Catan's Rappaccini's Daughter, the first opera by a Mexican composer to be performed in the United States, Carlisle Floyd's The Passion of Jonathan Wade, Of Mice and Men and Cold Sassy Tree, the world premiere of Myron Fink's The Conquistador, Andre Previn's A Streetcar Named Desire, Thérèse Raquin by Tobias Picker, Samuel Barber's Vanessa and Jake Heggie's Moby Dick.

His stage directing credits include La bohème (1981) and The Tales of Hoffmann (1982) for the State Opera of South Australia; Cavalleria rusticana and Pagliacci for Santa Barbara Grand Opera (1999). For San Diego Opera he has staged Falstaff (1999), Il trovatore (2000), Tosca (2002), Katya Kabanova (2004) with Patricia Racette, La traviata (2004) with Anja Harteros singing her first Violetta, La bohème (2005) with Richard Leech, Don Quichotte (2009) with Ferruccio Furlanetto and Denyce Graves, and Murder in the Cathedral (2013) with Furlanetto.

In 1998 in association with UCSD-TV he created the television programs Opera Spotlight and Opera Talk! With Nicolas Reveles. For 20 years Campbell produced and hosted programs on San Diego radio, and in 2003 his program “At the Opera with Ian Campbell” was awarded both First Place for a Radio Series, and Best of Show for Radio by the San Diego Press Club.

Campbell is a past chairman of Opera America. He was a guest professor of music at San Diego State University in 1986, conducted annual master classes for singers at the Music Academy of the West in Santa Barbara for seven years, and chaired the judging panel for the Metropolitan Opera auditions in the Sydney Opera House in Australia in August 1989.

In March 2014 he proposed to the board of directors that San Diego Opera should be dissolved at the conclusion of its 2014 season in April, citing a decrease in attendance and in major donations. The opera's board of directors agreed by a 33–1 vote. The announcement came as a shock to the public, because the company has no debt and had given no public hint it was contemplating closure. Amid public criticism of the board and of Campbell personally, the closure deadline was extended several times, and numerous board members including the president resigned. The remaining board members chose a new president and placed Campbell on paid administrative leave, effective April 25, 2014. On May 15 it was announced that he would be leaving the company. After a meeting of the board of directors on May 16, the board voted to rescind the decision to close and announced plans for a 2015 season consisting of three operas.

He directed Terrence McNally's play, Master Class, for Orlando Opera in 2015. For three summers he was a member of the faculty for Martina Arroyo's young artist program, Prelude to Performance in New York, directing La bohème (2016), Suor Angelica and Gianni Schicchi (2017) and Falstaff (2018). He directed Aida for Opera Idaho in 2019.

== Personal life ==
He married soprano Rachel Gettler in 1982 but they divorced in 1984. In 1985 he married Ann Spira, the San Diego Opera's director of strategic planning and projects. From 1983 through 2014 they were the top and highest-paid administrators of San Diego Opera. They divorced in 2012 and have two sons. In December 2014 he married soprano, Susan Neves. They reside in DeLand, Florida.
