= Helmut Holzapfel (tenor) =

South African tenor (born 1941)

Helmut Holzapfel (born 4 December 1941) is a South-African operatic tenor.

== Life ==
Born in Robertson, South Africa, Holzapfel, son of a choirmaster and a singer, he studied music at the Stellenbosch University in South Africa and at the University of Music and Performing Arts Vienna with Erik Werba. He made his stage debut at the age of 21 in Cape Town as Don Ottavio in Don Giovanni, but only as a replacement.

He had his first permanent engagement at the Stadttheater Klagenfurt from 1971 to 1972. From 1972 to 1977, he worked at the Tyrolean State Theatre, and since 1977 he has been a member of the Staatstheater Stuttgart.

He sang mainly parts from the feature and character roles such as David in Die Meistersinger von Nürnberg, Pedrillo in Die Entführung aus dem Serail, Basilio in Le nozze di Figaro, Valzacchi in Der Rosenkavalier. Also lyrical roles such as Count Almaviva in Il barbiere di Siviglia, Ferrando in Così fan tutte and Fenton in Verdi's Falstaff were part of his repertoire.

He also performed as a lieder singer at the Salzburg Mozartwoche in 1976 and on a major tour of South America in 1983 (appearances in Buenos Aires, Santiago de Chile, Montevideo, Rio de Janeiro, São Paulo).

In 1992, he received his doctorate with a thesis on the South African song composer Stephanus Le Roux Marais.
