= Maasniel =

- Neighbourhood and former village
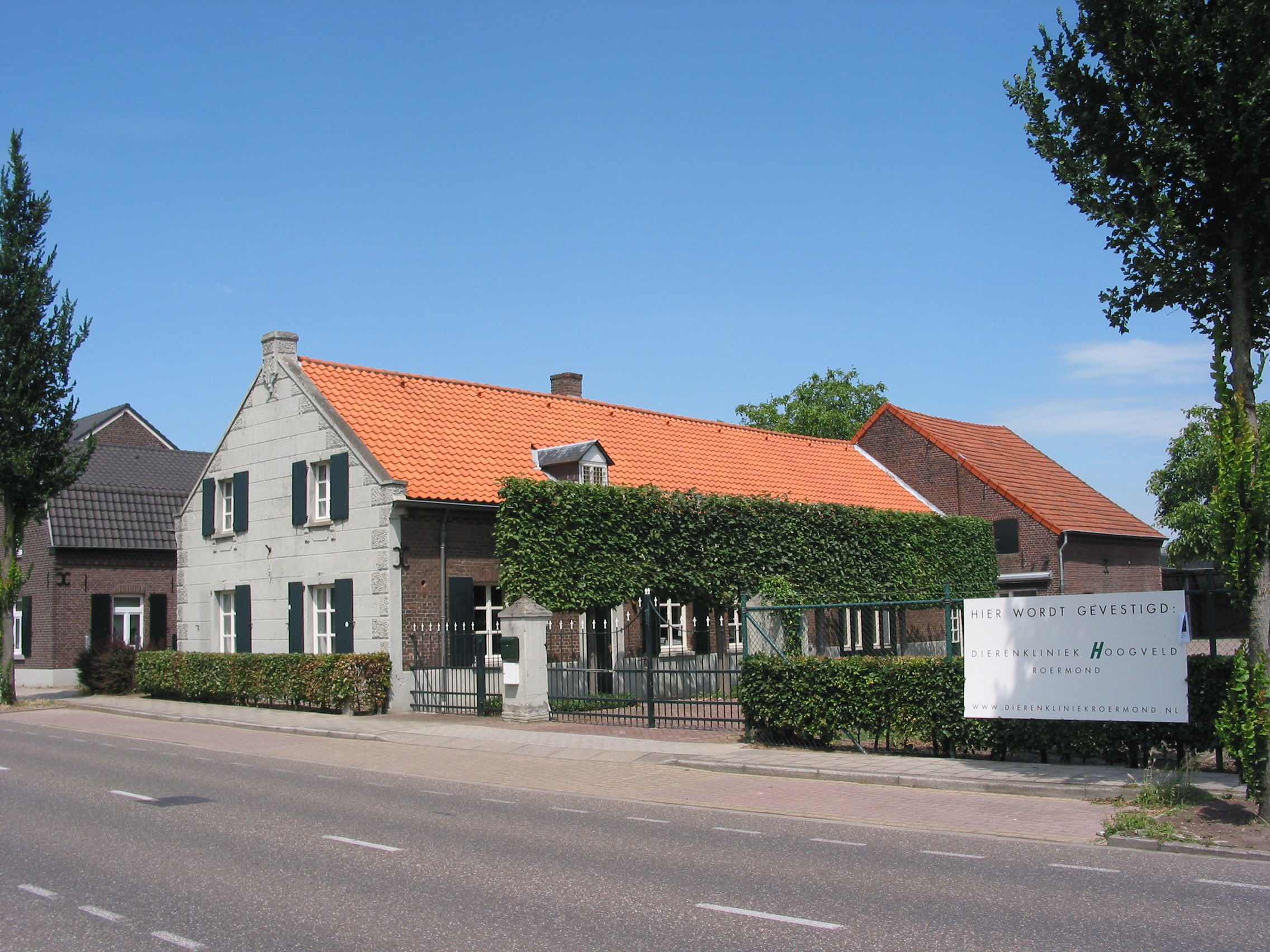
- Veterinarian in Maasniel

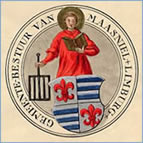
- Coat of arms

- Location in the Netherlands Location in the province of Limburg in the Netherlands
- Coordinates: 51°11′57″N 6°0′49″E
- Country: Netherlands
- Province: Limburg
- Municipality: Roermond

Area
  - Total: 1.01 km^{2} (0.39 sq mi)
- Elevation: 27 m (89 ft)

Population (2021)
  - Total: 3,610
  - Density: 3,570/km^{2} (9,260/sq mi)
- Time zone: UTC+1 (CET)
  - Summer (DST): UTC+2 (CEST)
- Postal code: 6042
- Dialing code: 0475

Maasniel is a neighbourhood of Roermond in the Dutch province of Limburg. It is located east of the city centre.

Maasniel used to be a separate village. It was a separate municipality until 1959, when it was merged with Roermond.
