= San Diego Opera =

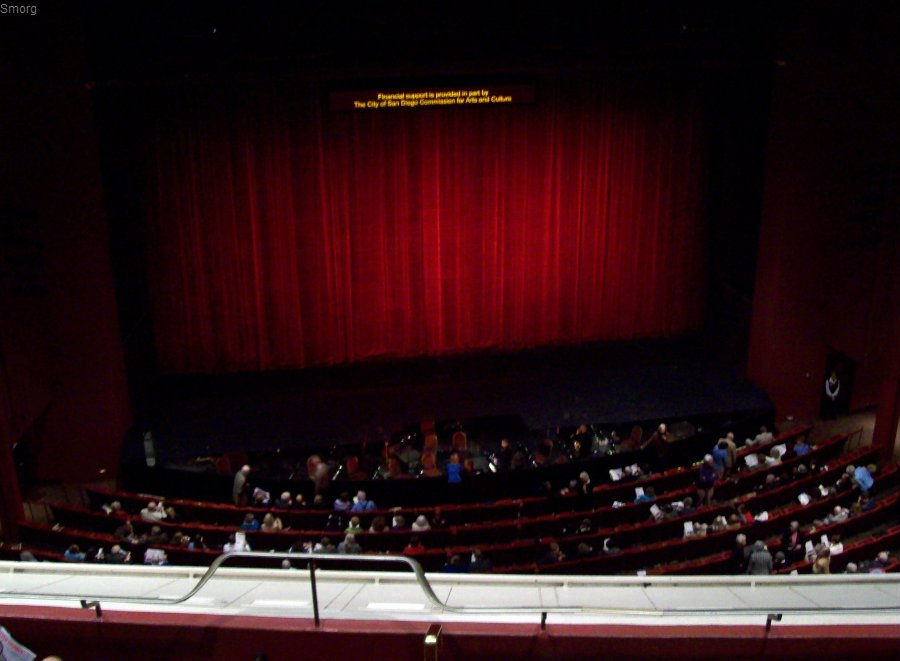
The San Diego Civic Theatre in downtown San Diego

The San Diego Opera (SDO) is a professional opera company based in San Diego, California. The opera performs at the San Diego Civic Theatre. The San Diego Symphony serves as the orchestra for the opera.

== History ==
San Diego Opera Guild was founded in 1950 to present San Francisco Opera productions in the San Diego community. San Diego Opera Association was incorporated in 1965 as a producing company and presented its first staging of La bohème at the San Diego Civic Theatre. It is a member of the professional association OPERA America, which ranked it among the top ten opera companies in the United States.

The founding SDO general director was Walter Herbert, who served in that position from 1965 until his death in 1975. Tito Capobianco served as general director from 1976 to 1983, during which time he "expanded the season to six productions, featuring renowned superstars such as Joan Sutherland, Luciano Pavarotti and Beverly Sills", as well as beginning an annual two-opera Verdi Festival which ceased in 1984 after his departure.

Until the 2008 recession, it presented five operas each season; in 2008 this was reduced to four productions, scheduled from January to April. In March 2014 the opera board announced that the 2014 season would be its last, but this decision was later rescinded by the company's board of directors, and a cut down version of the already planned 2015 season was announced, reducing the number of titles from four to three.

Between 1983 and 2014, the general director was Ian Campbell who achieved considerable success as well as creating financial stability for the company. Campbell left the company in May 2014, following his contentious recommendation to shut the opera. Since 2015 the general director has been David Bennett.

=== Proposal to close the company, March/April 2014 ===
On March 19, 2014, the opera's board of directors voted to cease operations after its final performance on April 13, 2014, citing diminishing audiences and increasing costs. The announcement came as a shock to the public, because the company has no debt and had given no hint it was contemplating closure; director Campbell explained that the board decided to "wind down with dignity and grace" rather than become bankrupt. However, at a special board meeting on March 31, the board voted to delay the closure until April 29, to allow more time for major donors to come forward and to consider other options that could possibly save the 2015 season. Meanwhile, the labor union representing singers, chorus members and production personnel filed several complaints with the National Labor Relations Board about the decision to cease operation.

In a dramatic meeting on April 17, the opera's board of directors voted to extend the shutdown deadline at least until May 19. The chairman of the board and twelve other board members resigned. Board member Carol Lazier was chosen as acting president; she proposed that the opera reorganize rather than shut down. The national organization OPERA America was reported to be working with board members to come up with a list of possible savings and reforms.

On April 25 it was announced that director Campbell and his ex-wife, who was also a high-ranking administrator with the opera, had both been placed on paid administrative leave. On May 15 the board reported that Campbell and his former wife were leaving the company. At a meeting of the board of directors on May 16, the group voted to rescind the decision to close. The board also launched a crowdsourcing campaign with a goal of raising $1 million to help underwrite a 2015 season.

=== Subsequent seasons ===
Following Campbell's departure in May 2014, William Mason, the former director of the Lyric Opera of Chicago, was appointed to the newly created position of artistic adviser to SDO. Mason commented, "They want me to help guide the company though the next season or two....I'll finalize some artistic and production details, help reduce expenses and get the board and the staff working together to figure out what the company can and should do as it moves forward." Later that month the board announced plans for a 2015 season consisting of three operas, La boheme, Don Giovanni, and John Adams' Nixon in China, at the same time stating that its goal was to raise $6.5 million and that $4 million had already been raised (including $2.1 million from crowdfunding).

In March 2015 the company announced the hiring of David Bennett, executive director of the Gotham Chamber Opera, as General Director of the San Diego Opera. He started on June 15, 2015. He was "tasked with downsizing and reimagining the company for 21st century audiences." He cut the company's budget from $18 million in 2014 to $10 million in 2018 and established a schedule of three traditional opera productions each year, along with a "Detour series" of smaller, more innovative works and increased community outreach programs.

== Notable performers ==
Since 2005, musicians from the San Diego Symphony have performed as the pit orchestra for San Diego Opera.

Notable artists, in addition to those named above, who have performed with San Diego Opera include Ferruccio Furlanetto, Denyce Graves, Richard Bonynge, Richard Leech, Plácido Domingo, Renée Fleming, Jane Eaglen, Richard Margison, Jerry Hadley, Vivica Genaux, Isabel Bayrakdarian, James Westman and Carol Vaness.

Notable productions include the world premieres of Gian Carlo Menotti's La Loca (1979, written for and starring Beverly Sills); Myron Fink's The Conquistador (1993); and Alva Henderson's Medea. United States premieres included Daniel Catán's Rapaccini's Daughter, Hans Werner Henze's Der junge Lord, Riccardo Zandonai's Giulietta e Romeo, and Emmanuel Chabrier's Gwendoline.

Additional notable performances and productions include the farewell performance of Beverly Sills opposite Joan Sutherland in Die Fledermaus (1980); the San Diego Opera-commissioned productions by Zandra Rhodes of The Magic Flute (2001) and The Pearl Fishers (2004); and the West Coast premieres of Giuseppe Verdi's Giovanna d'Arco and I Lombardi, and of Sergei Prokofiev's The Love for Three Oranges. In a 2023 production of Giacomo Puccini's one-act comic opera Gianni Schicchi, the baritone role of Gianni was sung by mezzo-soprano Stephanie Blythe, possibly the first time in the world that a female singer has performed a baritone role in a professional production.
