= Casa Mañana =

Theatre in Fort Worth, Texas, US

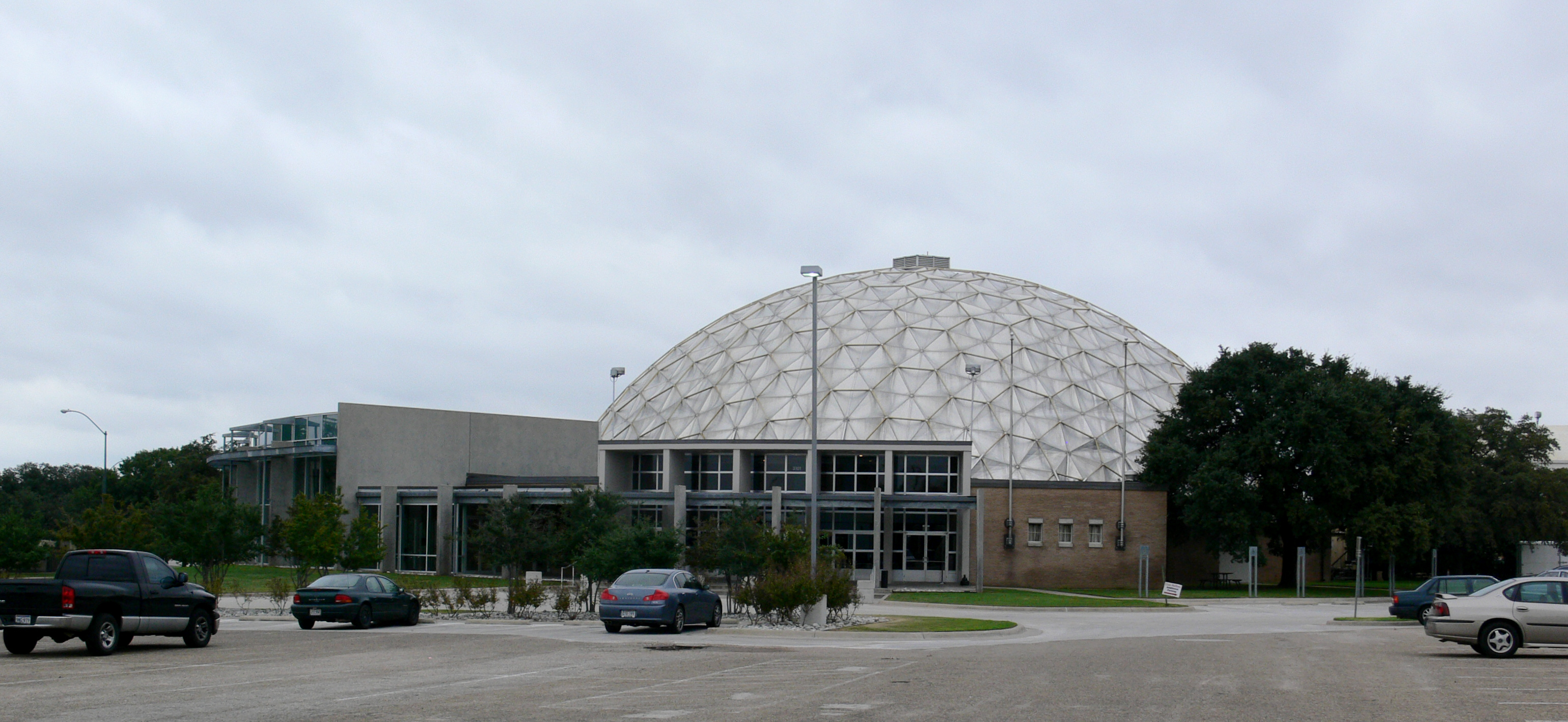
- Interactive map of Casa Mañana
- Address: 3101 West Lancaster Avenue; Fort Worth, Texas; United States
- Coordinates: 32°44′46″N 97°21′45″W
- Operator: Casa Mañana Musicals, Inc.
- Capacity: 1049

Construction
- Opened: 1936
- Reopened: July 5, 1958

Website
- casamanana.org

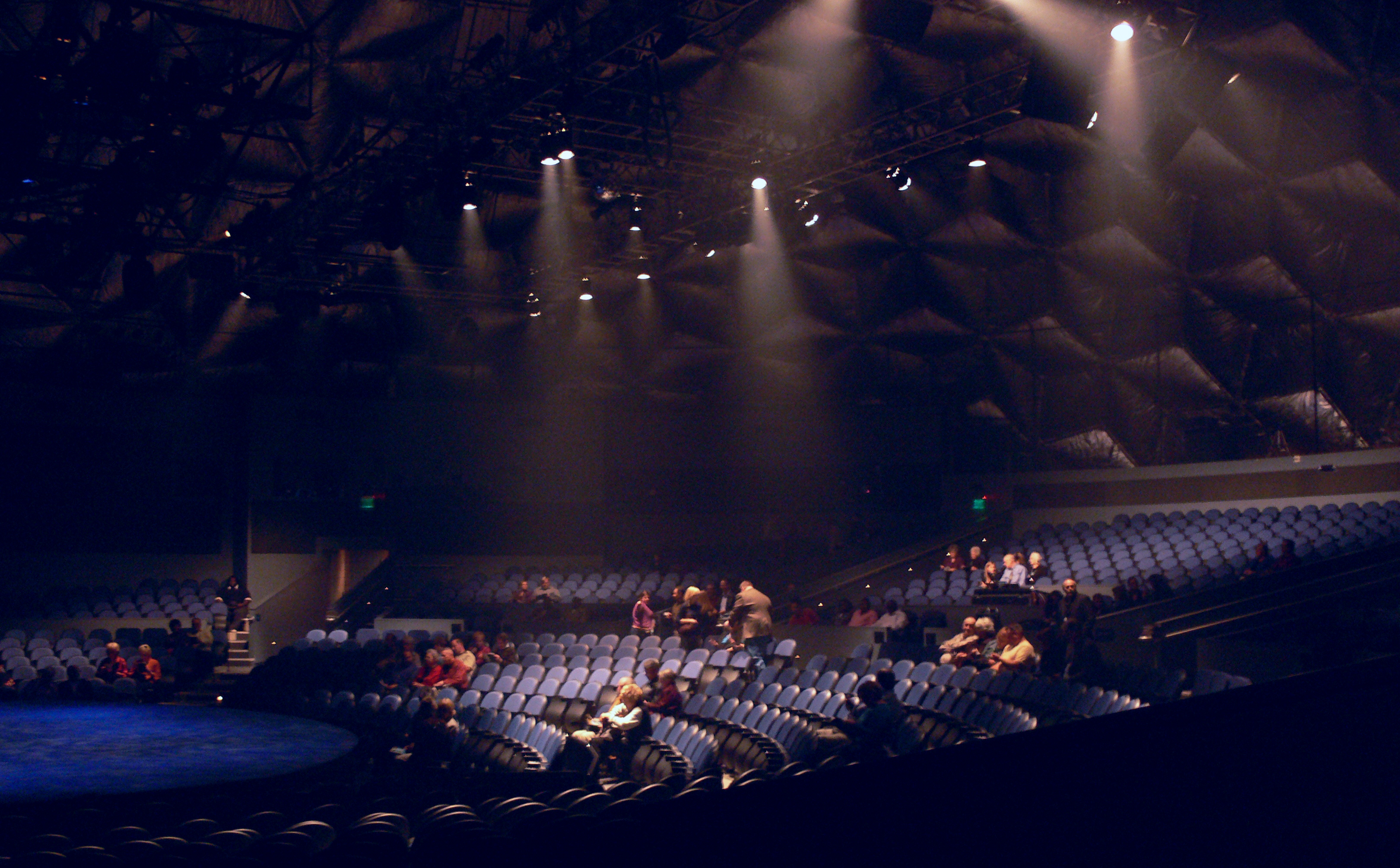
Casa Mañana, auditorium

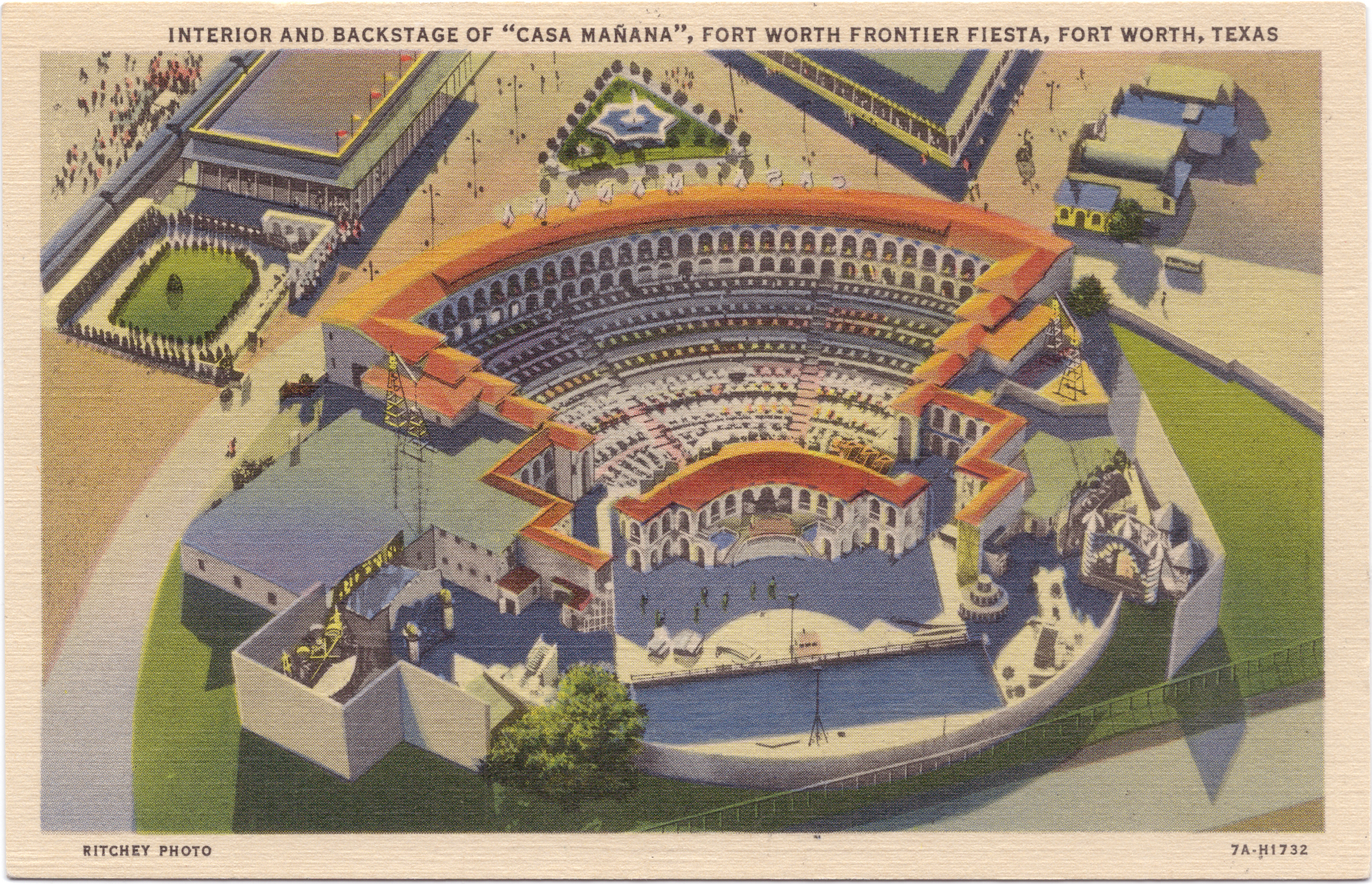
Postcard of Casa Mañana, 1936

Casa Mañana Theatre (also known as the "House of Tomorrow") is located in the Fort Worth Cultural District, Texas. Originally an outdoor amphitheater, Casa opened in 1936 as part of the official Texas Centennial Celebration. Casa Mañana is a member of the Fort Worth Chamber of Commerce, Cultural District Alliance, Fort Worth Hispanic Chamber of Commerce, Fort Worth Metropolitan Black Chamber of Commerce, the Live Theatre League of Tarrant County, and the National Alliance for Musical Theatre.

== Contract issue ==
In February 2022, Casa Mañana staged Matilda: The Musical. However, controversy occurred when the billing was changed from a Youth event to a MainStage Broadway Series production. The Tony Award winning show was originally billed as a youth production on Casa Mañana’s website. Such events typically present with less rigorous standards, including earlier curtain times, shortened versions of shows, and ticket prices that are more amenable to families and young audiences. Youth events are also allowed to be accompanied by a pre-recorded soundtrack. After a nearly 2 year COVID-imposed hiatus from full-time production, when Matilda came back into the rotation, Casa Mañana advertised it as both a Children’s Show and a Broadway Series show, with full Broadway ticket prices. However, there was no live orchestra, as was a required part of a Collective Bargaining Agreement with the American Federation of Musicians. The AFM has taken the issue with Casa Mañana to the National Labor Relations Board, filing two unfair labor practices complaints against Casa. In addition, Actors Equity Association and the Stage Directors and Choreographers Society are pursuing breach of their own contracts at this same theater.
