= Yitzhak Attias =

Gibraltar-born Israeli Jewish musician

Yitzhak Attias יצחק עטיאס
- Born: Gibraltar
- Origin: Jerusalem, Israel
- Genres: Jewish rock, world music
- Occupations: Singer, songwriter, percussionist
- Years active: 1985–present
- Website: yitzhakattiasmusic.com

Yitzhak Attias (Hebrew: יצחק עטיאס; born 9 September 1958) is a Gibraltar-born Israeli Jewish musician. He was the percussionist for Reva L'Sheva for several years and has released two solo albums.

== Early life ==
Attias was born in Gibraltar. He attended Jewish day school until age 11.

Attias initially planned to become a drummer like his friend Joe Levy, but was inspired to percussion by watching Steve Peregrin Took of the band T. Rex. He was also influenced by Santana and Osibisa, as well as flamenco and African music. As a child, he attended Carmel College boarding school in Oxfordshire, England. Musician David Broza was an older student there, and the young Attias would often play percussion alongside him and his friends.

He left school at age 16 to pursue a music career and came to Israel, where he lived on Kibbutz Be'erot Yitzhak after being invited by a cousin. Feeling unsatisfied, he left the kibbutz and moved to Netanya.

== Career ==
=== Gather the Sparks and Reva L'Sheva ===
After moving to Israel, Attias worked with musicians like Yehuda Glantz and Eli Massias (later of Heedoosh). Both contributed to his debut album, Gather the Sparks, released in 1987. Many of the songs had been written with Attias' previous band, Ladino, and were inspired by the teachings of Rabbi Nachman of Breslov.

Attias was a percussionist with the pioneering Jewish rock band Reva L'Sheva from 1999 until their break-up in 2006. He performed on four of their albums, including their final album, V'Sham Nashir. In 2014, he participated in a Reva L'Sheva reunion concert at Zappa Jerusalem alongside Yehudah Katz, Lazer Lloyd, Nitzan Chen Razel, and Chanan Elias.

=== Reshimu ===
Attias released a second solo album, Reshimu, in 2012, after four and a half years of development. He worked again with Massias, as well as jazz musicians Ofer Portugali, Yorai Oron, Yaron Gottfried, and Yoram Lachish.

He performed at the 2014 Moshav Country Fair at Mevo Modi'im alongside Yehudah Katz and Ben Zion Solomon.

== Personal life ==
Attias lives with his family near the Jerusalem Forest. His wife, Tamar Lauffer Attias, whom he met in the early 1980s, is a professional flautist who plays with the all-female Jewish rock band Tofa'ah as well as on several of her husband's albums. His sons Yonatan Attias and Michael Attias founded the Indie-rock band NURIEL, and another of his sons, David Attias, soon joined as a band member.

Attias was inspired as a young man by musician Carlos Santana's spiritual journey as expressed in his music. He also read Hermann Hesse and was introduced through Martin Buber's work to Rabbi Nachman of Breslov, who intrigued him with his emphasis on music in religious practice. He has said that while he was raised Sefardi and follows Sephardic law and customs, he identifies with the Hasidic outlook and philosophy in his hashkafa.

== Discography ==
=== Solo albums ===
- Gather the Sparks (1987)
- Reshimu (2012)

=== With Reva L'Sheva ===
- Etz Chaim Hee (Voices Along the Path, 1999)
- Ahavat Chinam (Mayim/Welcome Music, 2001)
- 10: Live (Noam Hafakot, 2004)
- V'Sham Nashir (Noam Hafakot, 2005)

=== With Shlomo Carlebach ===
- Shlomo Sings with the Children of Israel (Hiney Anochi V'hayeladim) (1989) – percussion
- The Gift of Shabbos (1995) – percussion
- Open Your Hearts (Music Made From The Soul, Vol. 1) (1986 Recordings) (1997) – percussion
- Holy Brothers and Sisters (Music Made From The Soul, Vol. 2) (1986 Recordings) (1997) – percussion

=== Featured appearances ===
- Ashira Morgenstern, Ashira 2: Castle of Water (1985) – "Rachel (The Courage to Live)", "Tu B'Av"
- Various, Tomorrow Will Be Shabbos (2001) – "Kah Ribbon"
- Ashira Morgenstern, Faith is Like a Garden (2006) – "Circle Dance", "King and Emperor"
- Various, Symphony of the Spirit (2012) – "Soul Waves", "Forest Niggun", "Wandering", "Niggun Simcha", "Snow Gently Falling"
