= NuCLEus =

Coordinates: 41°29′52.7″N 81°41′20.5″W

nuCLEus was a proposed mixed-used development complex planned for the Gateway District of downtown Cleveland, Ohio, United States. The project won unanimous approval from the Cleveland Planning Commission in November 2014, and recently received schematic design approval from the City of Cleveland in March 2019 after a thoughtful redesign to fit the city's growing population and needs in downtown Cleveland. Robert L. Stark of Cleveland-based Stark Enterprises is the lead developer on the nuCLEus.

The $300M mixed-use project was going to encompass approximately two million square feet in the heart of the city at the intersection between East Fourth Street, Prospect Avenue and Huron Road, connecting many of the venues in the Central Business District.

nuCLEus was planned to serve as a mixed-use, vertically integrated space with a mix of Class A office space, retail, restaurants and residential living divided between two distinct, 24 floor towers. At one time, plans included a hotel, but that was later scrapped.

== Planning ==
Beginning back in 2014, Developer Bob Stark and his team at Stark Enterprises have constructed the $300 Million dollar office, retail, entertainment, hotel, and residential complex in the heart of the Gateway District. Stark said in November 2014 that "like most proud Clevelanders, I love my city. I have the opportunity to express my love."

Stark went in front of the City of Cleveland this past March presenting a new plan for nuCLEus which calls to new industries and spaces lacking in the Central Business District. With the approved schematic design, the project is moving forward with the hopes of breaking ground by the end of 2019. However, plans to break ground was later moved to March 2020, but was put on hold after the COVID-19 pandemic started. Later, in December 2021, a new buyer took over the site from Stark, all but confirming that the nuCLEus project was dead.

Stark is most famous for the development on the major retail, office, residential, entertainment campus in Westlake, Ohio known as Crocker Park.

== Design ==
The complex was a mix of ultra modern, mixed-use construction, a specialty of Stark Enterprises and their portfolio spanning over 8 states.

Plans were centered around the use of enhancing the connectivity, visibility and brand of Downtown Cleveland, maximizing space with a parking garage housing 1,300+ spots, pedestrian laneway between the two towers and community activity spaces. nuCLEus was planned to be on the site of the city's Central Market which before its close in the 1990s.

== See also ==
- List of tallest buildings in Cleveland
