= Iron Skillet =

Iron Skillet may refer to:

- Frying pan
- Iron Skillet (trophy), the trophy awarded to the victor of the SMU–TCU football rivalry
- Iron Skillet (restaurant), an American restaurant chain attached to Petro Stopping Centers
