= Chasidica =

Chasidica חסידיקא
- Origin: Jerusalem, Israel
- Genres: Jewish rock, alternative rock, hard rock, heavy metal
- Years active: 2007–present
- Members: Sagi Givol; Idan Givol; Moshe Somech; Tomer Einat
- Past members: See below
- Website: chasidica.co.il

Chasidica (Hebrew: חסידיקא) is an Israeli Jewish hard rock band formed in 2007 by brothers Sagi and Idan Givol.

== Biography ==
Chasidica was formed in 2007 by brothers Sagi and Idan Givol. Sagi lived in Australia for eight years and fronted the heavy metal band Demona before becoming a baal teshuva to Hasidic Judaism in 2002.

In 2009, they began a series of concerts called Yehudi Alternativi ("Jewish Alternative") to help promote similarly-minded Jewish artists. One of the first of these concerts was at Jerusalem's Canaan club with Chasidica, klezmer-fusion band Ramzailech, and Hasidic blues rock band Yood.

The band is currently working on a debut album with Shai Lahav of Dr. Kasper's Bunny Show.

== Musical style ==
The Givol brothers grew up listening to heavy metal and experimental music. They have claimed among their influences both Hasidic music and the band Fortisakharof. Ynet reviewer Vicky Epstein noted elements from the Pixies and likened their vocals to that of Faith No More's Mike Patton. In addition, their sound utilizes klezmer instruments like violins, clarinets, and occasional Middle Eastern instruments like the darbouka.

== Members ==
=== Current members ===
- Sagi Givol – guitars, lead vocals
- Idan Givol – bass, backing vocals
- Moshe Somech – drums
- Tomer Einat – violin

=== Former members ===
- Dror Cohen – drums
- Michael Gabizon – keyboards
