= Robert L. Stark =

American real estate developer (born 1951)

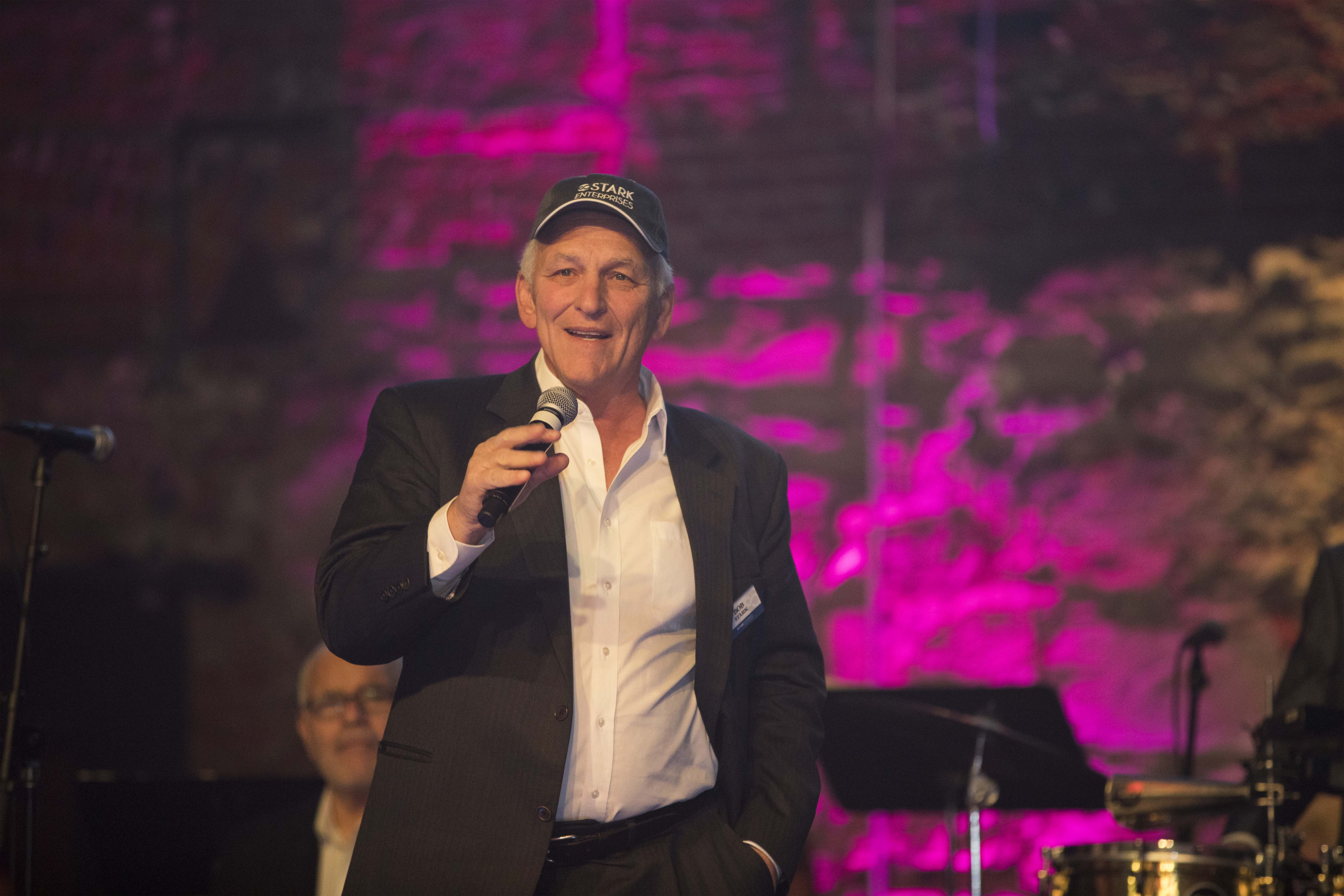
- Stark speaking at the company's annual Night of Appreciation event, February 2018
- Born: 1951 (age 74–75)
- Other name: Bob Stark
- Education: B.A. University of Rochester; J.D. Case Western Reserve University School of Law
- Occupation: Real Estate Developer
- Known for: President & Founder of Stark Enterprises
- Spouse: Married
- Children: Four
- Website: http://starkenterprises.com

Robert L. Stark (born 1951) is an American real estate developer and founder and chief executive officer of Stark Enterprises.

== Biography ==
Born to a Jewish family in Cleveland, Stark is a graduate of Hawken School (1969), the University of Rochester (B.A. 1975), and Case Western Reserve University School of Law (J.D. 1978). He is a member of the Ohio Bar. He started developing real estate in 1974. In 1990, he developed the Promenade of Westlake, one of the first strip malls that featured upscale tenants, expensive finishes, and a $1 million landscaped center. In 2004, he developed the $450 million Crocker Park in Westlake, Ohio which mixes residential apartments with retail stores, restaurants and parks. Crocker Park was modeled on Mizner Park in Boca Raton, Florida. He also redeveloped the Strip in Canton, Ohio (which relocated the center of real estate activity from the downtown to the suburbs) and Eton Chagrin Boulevard (formerly Eton on Chagrin) in Woodmere, Ohio.

In 2010, Stark approached singer-songwriter Yehudah Katz to reinterpret and record some poetry he had written. This resulted in an album called Biladecha Lo Avo ("I'm Not Going Without You"). Produced by Gilad Vital of Shotei Hanevuah, the album received positive reviews and airplay in Israel and was played on El Al flights.

In November 2014, Stark proposed to build a $300 million, 54-story 650-foot office, entertainment, residential, retail, and hotel complex that will be located in downtown Cleveland's Gateway Sports and Entertainment Complex District named NuCLEus. He purchased the land in September 2014 for $26 million. The project won unanimous approval from the Cleveland Planning Commission in November 2014. The tower would be the 4th tallest building in the city.

Stark also invests real estate and donates to charities in Israel. He headed an investor group that invested over $3 billion in a new university town in Safed, Israel that included a medical school affiliated with Bar-Ilan University. In October 2011, Israel's fifth medical school opened in Safed, housed in a renovated historic building in the center of town that was once a branch of Hadassah Hospital.

== Personal life ==
Stark is married and has four children. He practices Orthodox Judaism. He is a past president of Fuchs Mizrachi School, the founder of the Safed Foundation, and a vice president of Young Israel of Cleveland.
