= Westlake High School (Ohio) =

Public high school in Westlake, Ohio, United States

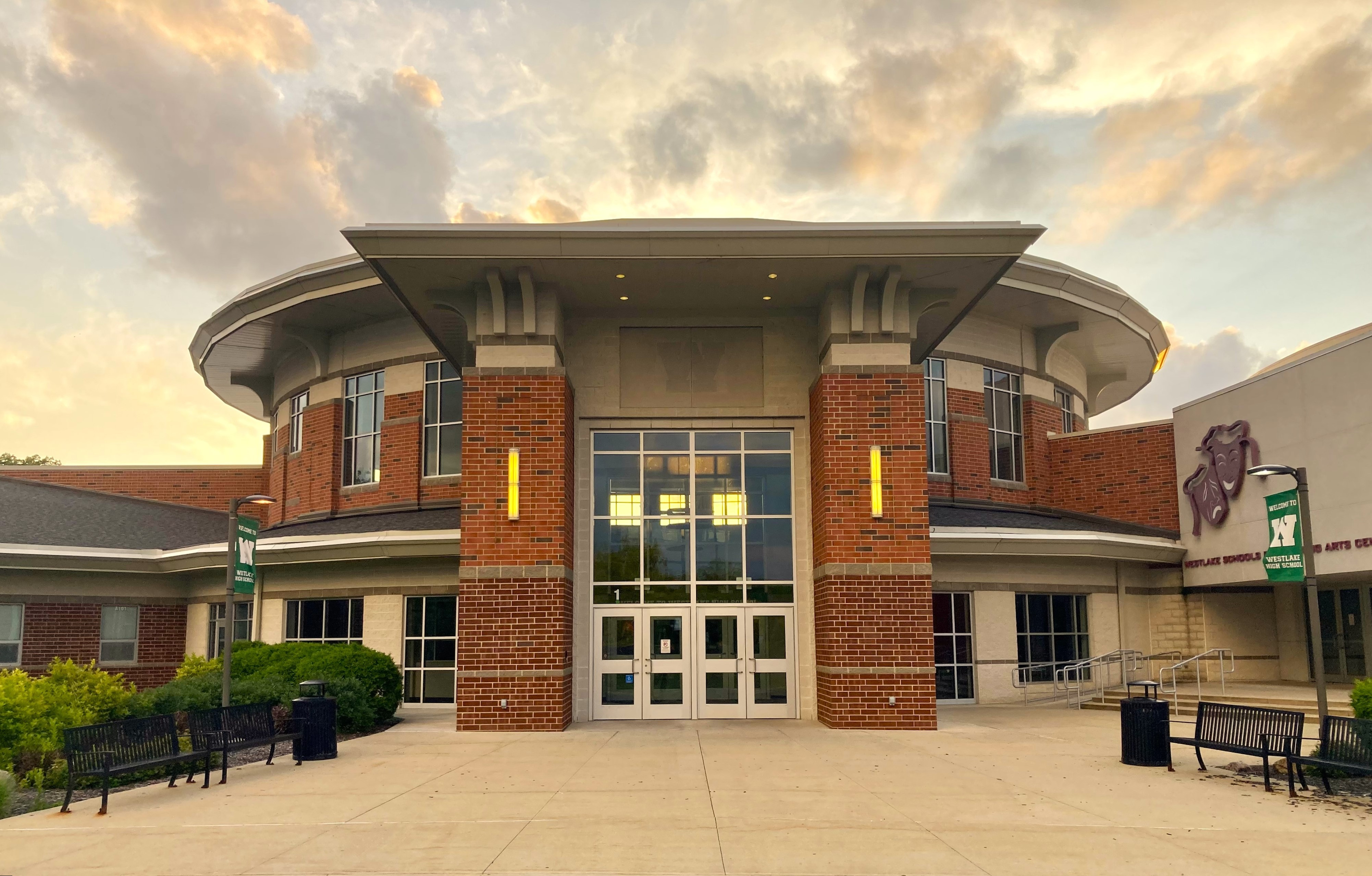

Location
- 27830 Hilliard Boulevard; Westlake, (Cuyahoga County), Ohio 44145; United States
- Coordinates: 41°27′39″N 81°55′42″W

Information
- Type: Public high school
- Established: 1960
- School district: Westlake City School District
- Superintendent: Scott Goggin
- Principal: Rob Woods
- Staff: 343
- Teaching staff: 70.60 (FTE)
- Grades: 9-12
- Student to teacher ratio: 15.06
- Campus: Suburban
- Campus type: Suburb
- Colors: Forest green White
- Athletics conference: Cleveland West Conference
- Team name: Demons
- National ranking: 1,488
- Newspaper: The Green and White
- Website: www.wlake.org/our-schools/westlake-high

Westlake High School is a public high school located in Westlake, Ohio, United States, west of Cleveland. It is the only high school in the Westlake City Schools District. Athletic teams are known as the Demons, and they compete as a member of the Ohio High School Athletic Association in the Cleveland West Conference.

== Campus ==
Westlake High School was rebuilt and completed in 2013. The high school features a rotunda housing the cafeteria. Academic wings are divided into two floors, with classrooms grouped in sections, known as wings. The A wing houses Miscellaneous rooms, the B wing houses English on the first floor, and Mathematics on the 2nd floor. The C wing houses the sciences and is only one floor. The D wing houses history on the first floor and Foreign Language/ESL on the 2nd floor. The E wing hosts Arts and T&E classes. There is no 2nd floor. The F wing hosts music education and the large Performing Arts Center, housing 400 seats and a mainstage with a pit.

The school has one baseball diamond, two softball diamonds, five tennis courts, and a football stadium complete with turf, where Westlake plays in the fall, winter, and spring.

== Academics ==
Westlake High School offers AP (Advanced Placement) and CCP (College Credit Plus) courses offered through Cuyahoga Community College, in an addition to a variety of honors classes and electives spanning from arts, business, computer science/technology, and engineering. The Westshore Career Technical Program in partnership with other area schools provides students with experience to go into blue-collar jobs if they so choose.

=== Quality of education ===
Ninety percent of students who graduate Westlake continue on to a two-to-four-year university.

== Demographics ==
- 79.1% White
- 7.3% Hispanic
- 6.5% Asian
- 4.9% Two or More Races
- 2.1% African American
- 0.2% Native American

Westlake High School is known for having a large Arab-American population, comprising approximately 20% of the student body.

== Sports ==
Westlake High School currently offers:

- Baseball
- Basketball
- Bowling
- Cheerleading
- Cross Country
- Golf
- Gymnastics
- Football
- Ice Hockey
- Lacrosse
- Soccer
- Softball
- Swimming and diving
- Tennis
- Track and field
- Volleyball
- Wrestling

== Student media ==
The Green and White is a monthly student newspaper serving Westlake High School. WHBS-Television is a weekly student news channel serving Westlake High School

== Notable alumni ==
- JaQuan Hardy, former professional football player in the National Football League (NFL)
- Kevin Houser, former professional football player in the National Football League (NFL)
- Robert F. Overmyer, former astronaut
- Logan Paul, influencer and professional wrestler in the WWE.
- Jake Paul, influencer and professional boxer
- Steve Ricchetti, Counselor to the President and former Chief of Staff to the Vice President
