= Westlake City School District =

School district in Ohio, United States

Address
- 24365 Hilliard Boulevard Westlake, Ohio, 44145; United States

District information
- Type: Public
- Grades: PK–12
- Superintendent: Scott Goggin
- Schools: 4
- NCES District ID: 3904506

Students and staff
- Students: 3,183 (2025–2026)
- Teachers: 223.42 (on an FTE basis) (2025–2026)
- Staff: 350.30 (on an FTE basis) (2025–2026)
- Student–teacher ratio: 14.25 (2025–2026)

Other information
- Website: www.wlake.org

The Westlake City School District is a public school district that serves Westlake, Ohio.

== Schools ==
- Westlake High School
- Lee Burneson Middle School
- Dover Intermediate School
- Westlake Elementary School

== Westlake Elementary School ==
Westlake Elementary School, abbreviated WES, is a school for K-4th Grade, with pre-K services offered too. It is located at 27555 Center Ridge Road, Westlake, Ohio. It was built in 2019. It has 3 principals, with Gregory Plantner being the main one, but with 3 other house principals responsible for two grade levels, instead of a more standard president/vice president relationship. They are as follows:

- Kindergarten/Pre-K: Paula Shaw
- First and second grade: Kim Tucker
- Third and fourth grade: Jim Sanfilippo

Westlake Elementary also has a PTA, with its head being Lauren Larkin.

== Dover Intermediate School ==
Dover Intermediate School, abbreviated DIS, is located at 2240 Dover Center Road, Westlake, Ohio. The building was built in 1950, and was originally a middle school, but is now an intermediate school for fifth to sixth grade. Its principal is Nicholas Miller, and its vice principal is Dameon Headings, a former teacher from Westlake Elementary School. Dover Intermediate also has a PTA program, headed by Samantha Harriger. Dover Intermediate also splits their school student base into 6 teams, 3 for each grade. The fifth grade teams are Red, Blue, and White. The sixth grade teams are Eagles, Stars, Stripes.

== Lee Burneson Middle School ==
Lee Burneson Middle School, abbreviated LBMS, serves 7th - 8th Grade. It is located at 2260 Dover Center Road, Westlake, Ohio. It sits right beside DIS. It was built in 1955, shortly after DIS, and served as some other building until, eventually, switching over to a middle school. Its principal is Brittany Meczka, and the assistant principal is Kevin Barre. It has a PTA is headed by Katie Tomici.^{1}

== Former Schools ==
Westlake has had several schools that are not in use or do not exist.
