= Yehudah Katz =

Israeli musical artist

Yehudah Katz יהודה כץ
- Born: Los Angeles, California, United States
- Genres: Jewish rock, folk, soul, world
- Occupations: Singer, songwriter, producer, arranger
- Instruments: Vocals, guitar, mandolin
- Years active: 1986–present
- Website: yehudahkatz.com

Yehudah Katz (Hebrew: יהודה כץ) is an American-born Israeli singer, songwriter, producer, arranger, and activist. He first rose to fame as the lead singer of seminal Jewish rock band Reva L'Sheva. As a solo artist, he has released three albums and performed with prominent Israeli singers like Ehud Banai and Kobi Oz. He is also the founder of the non-profit organization Artists and Musicians for Israel (AMI).

== Career ==
Katz, originally from Los Angeles, began his career as a backing musician for Rabbi Shlomo Carlebach, performing on several of his albums in the late 1980s and early 1990s. He and his wife immigrated to Israel in 1993.

=== Reva L'Sheva ===
Shortly after Carlebach's death in 1994, Katz formed the band Reva L'Sheva with several fellow Carlebach-inspired musicians, including guitarist Lazer Lloyd and bassist Adam Wexler. Combining Carlebach's music with a jam band style similar to the Grateful Dead, the group was credited with inspiring a new wave of Jewish rock bands like Soulfarm and Moshav Band. They released six albums before disbanding in 2006, although they gave a reunion show in 2014.

=== Artists and Musicians for Israel (AMI) ===
In 2005, Katz founded the non-profit Artists and Musicians for Israel (AMI). Based in Jerusalem, the organization uses workshops to teach Jewish young people around the world about Israeli culture and Jewish identity through music and art. They have held workshops in many Israeli high schools and pre-army mechinot. AMI also uses a series of concerts in their efforts. The first of these took place in Detroit, Michigan, where Reva L'Sheva and other Jewish musicians played for Orthodox, Reform, and Conservative congregations, as well as a show at the New Life Baptist Church where they were accompanied by a gospel choir.

=== Solo career ===
Katz released his first solo album, Come Close, shortly after moving to Israel in 1993.

Following his time with Reva L'Sheva, Katz largely focused on his work with AMI, though he occasionally performed acoustic shows. In 2010, Katz was approached by real estate developer and poet Robert L. Stark to record an album of the latter's compositions. The album, Biladecha Lo Avo ("I'm Not Going Without You"), was recorded with producer Gilad Vital and co-writer Roi Levi, both of Shotei Hanevuah, and was promoted with the single "Hodu". Upon release, it received positive reviews and radio airplay in Israel and was played on El Al flights. Katz toured in support of the album with a band that included Lior Shulman of Hatikva 6 on percussion, sharing the stage with artists like Hadag Nahash's Shaa'nan Streett and Teapacks' Kobi Oz.

His third album, Full Circle, was released in 2014.

== Personal life ==
Katz has lived in Israel with his family since 1993. They initially lived in Moshav Beit Meir before moving to the Israeli settlement of Tekoa, located in Gush Etzion, West Bank. His wife, Michelle Katz, is an accomplished torch singer. His youngest daughter, Daniella, received a bat mitzvah party in 2012, with guests including former Reva L'Sheva keyboardist Chanan Elias.

== Discography ==
=== Solo albums ===
- Come Close (Voices Along the Path, 1993)
- Biladecha Lo Avo ("I'm Not Coming Without You") (HaTav HaShmini, 2010)
- Full Circle (2014)

==== Music videos ====
- "Hodu" ("Thanks") (Biladecha Lo Avo, 2010)
- "Biladecha Lo Avo" (Biladecha Lo Avo, 2011)
- "Living On Through You" (Full Circle, 2015)

=== With Reva L'Sheva ===
- Higia HaZman (Voices Along the Path, 1996)
- Kumu (Noam Hafakot, 1998)
- Etz Chaim Hee (Voices Along the Path, 1999)
- Ahavat Chinam (Mayim/Welcome Music, 2001)
- 10: Live (Noam Hafakot, 2004)
- V'Sham Nashir (Noam Hafakot, 2005)

=== With Shlomo Carlebach ===
- Shlomo Sings with the Children Of Israel (Hiney Anochi V'hayeladim) (1989) – producer, acoustic guitar
- The Gift of Shabbos (1995) – producer, vocals, guitar
- Open Your Hearts (Music Made From The Soul, Vol. 1) (1986 Recordings) (1997) – producer, arranger, guitar, backing vocals
- Holy Brothers and Sisters (Music Made From The Soul, Vol. 2) (1986 Recordings) (1997) – producer, arranger, guitar, backing vocals
