= Westlake Porter Public Library =

Coordinates: 41°26′51″N 81°55′28″W

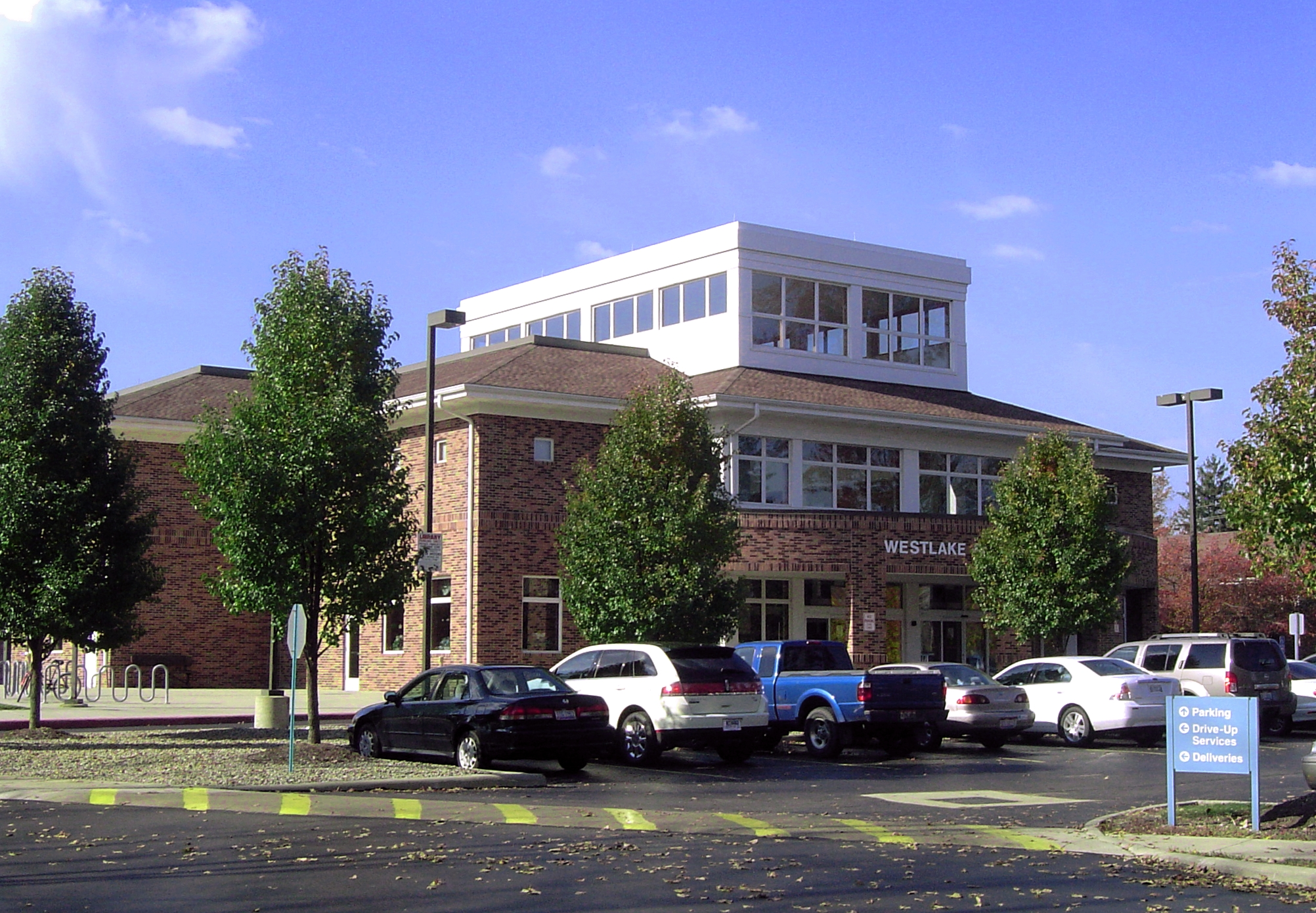
Westlake Porter Public Library

The Westlake Porter Public Library is a library that serves western Cuyahoga County and eastern Lorain County, Ohio, United States. The library is located at 27333 Center Ridge Road in Westlake, Ohio.

In 2009, the library loaned more than 1.47 million items to its 34,000 cardholders. Total holding are over 176,000 volumes with over 500 periodical subscriptions.

== History ==
In 1884, Leonard Porter willed the sum of $1,000 to the establishment of a public library in Dover Township, Ohio (which became Westlake Township in 1940, and the City of Westlake in 1957) and a collection of books to be housed within. Circulation records date back to 1893, when the average circulation per week was 24.083 books, or about 1,252 books per year. As Dover Township grew, so did its library. The town passed a tax revenue agreement in support of library funds in 1897.

Porter Library sponsored debates, meetings and social functions in the 1900s. An Ice Cream Saloon was held on alternate Saturdays. The library extended its collection and services to the Dover Township schools in 1920. In 1933 the permanent legislation enacted by the Ohio State Legislature allocated proceeds from personal property tax to the boards of library trustees. Porter Library received $3,096.

Audrey Ward served as library director from 1939-1960. The 1940s saw continued development of the library. The building was remodeled, hours of service increased, and the book budget improved. The library moved to new quarters in 1950: the Ohio Bell Telephone Company building at 27059 Center Ridge Road. By 1957, the library trustees realized that with the growth of the population of the community (an amazing rate of one family per day), Porter Library needed room to expand.

In July 1958 the library celebrated a groundbreaking for a new addition. The new wing opened on February 1, 1960. Under the leadership of library director, Kathleen Carnall, the library facilitated its goals of bringing people together, promoting community involvement, sharing information and encouraging learning. Porter Library staff developed pre-school and school-age children’s programming, such as story hours. They acquired a young adult collection, and extended library services to parochial schools. They supported adult programs and organized a pamphlet and picture file, a periodical collection, and a film, filmstrip, and phonograph collection.

In 1981 the library acquired a special mascot. A one-eyed gray and black tabby cat named Jiggers moved with the library when the building took permanent residence at 27333 Center Ridge Road in 1985.

Westlake Porter Public Library's catalog became an online version in 1986. The library provided patrons with computers and classes to learn how to use them. On October 12, 1992, Paula Miller, library director, joined the staff and shared her vision of the future. In the early 1990s, the library took on the role of a community center for advanced telecommunications and multimedia/electronic access. Collections also changed to include multimedia such as CDs, videos, and later DVDs. Online reference services became available. Outreach services expanded.

The library moved into a temporary facility in 1999 in the old Rego grocery store at 24350 Center Ridge Road, while the building expanded from 32,000 to 75,000 square feet (7,000 m^{2}). July 22, 2002, celebrated the new library’s opening day. The cutting edge features combined with enhanced traditional library services. Innovative designs upheld the mission of Westlake Porter Public Library, “to educate, empower, enlighten, and excite.”

Porter Library now offers a drive-up window, children’s imagination stations, listening stations, quiet rooms, meeting rooms, a café, and a gift shop. Over 1 million items were borrowed in 2002. In 2005, the library added a reading garden, a living room, improved PC scheduling, website enhancements, and digitization. On November 29, 2006, Andrew Mangels became the library director. The library circulated 1,384,499 items in 2007.

On April 29, 2023, Westlake Porter Public Library opened a Makerspace and revamped used book store known as the Book Nook, these spaces took over the previous gift shop and cafe spaces.
