= Quaker Steak & Lube =

U.S. casual dining restaurant chain

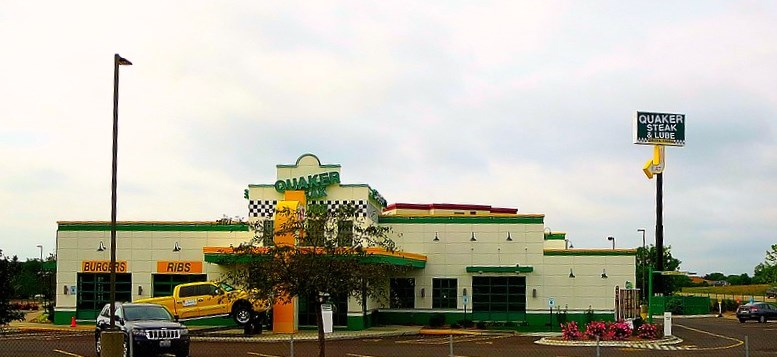
- Type: Subsidiary
- Industry: Restaurant
- Genre: Casual dining
- Founded: Sharon, Pennsylvania, United States (1974; 52 years ago)
- Founder: George "Jig" Warren III, Gary "Moe" Meszaros
- Headquarters: Bloomsburg, Pennsylvania
- Number of locations: 25 (2026)
- Area served: 7 States
- Key people: Gregg Lippert (CEO)
- Products: Steak; steakburgers; chicken; ribs; wings; sandwiches; soup; salads; kids menu; appetizers
- Parent: TravelCenters of America (2015–2021); JDK Management (2021–present)
- Website: thelube.com

Quaker Steak & Lube is a casual dining restaurant chain based in Bloomsburg, Pennsylvania. It was founded in 1974, in Sharon, Pennsylvania. The original restaurant was built by George "Jig" Warren III and Gary "Mo" Meszaros in an abandoned gas station in downtown Sharon, and decorated with license plates and old automobiles.

== History ==
In the aftermath of the 1973 oil crisis, amidst a wave of gas stations permanently closing, Jig Warren and Mo Meszaros wanted to preserve the culture of old gas stations and high-powered muscle cars. This idea eventually became a single Quaker Steak & Lube restaurant in Sharon, PA and eventually a chain of casual dining restaurants. The original Quaker Steak & Lube location, opened in 1974, includes a 1936 Chevrolet on the original hydraulic grease rack.

On November 16, 2015, immediately after filing for Chapter 11 bankruptcy, the company was acquired by TravelCenters of America, who planned to expand the chain, both in its number of truck stops and its number of standalone restaurant locations. JDK Management purchased Quaker Steak & Lube from TravelCenters for $5 million in early 2021.

== Awards ==
The restaurant has received over 70 awards in various national and regional competitions as of 2023.

== Media ==
The Pointe at North Fayette location in Pittsburgh, Pennsylvania, was featured in the Travel Channel series Man v. Food. The episode's challenge was to consume six "Atomic" chicken wings, the hottest wings on Quaker Steak's menu at the time. Host Adam Richman completed the challenge in the allotted time and was awarded a commemorative bumper sticker and a place on the restaurant's "Atomic Wall of Flame".
