= Ethnix =

Israeli band

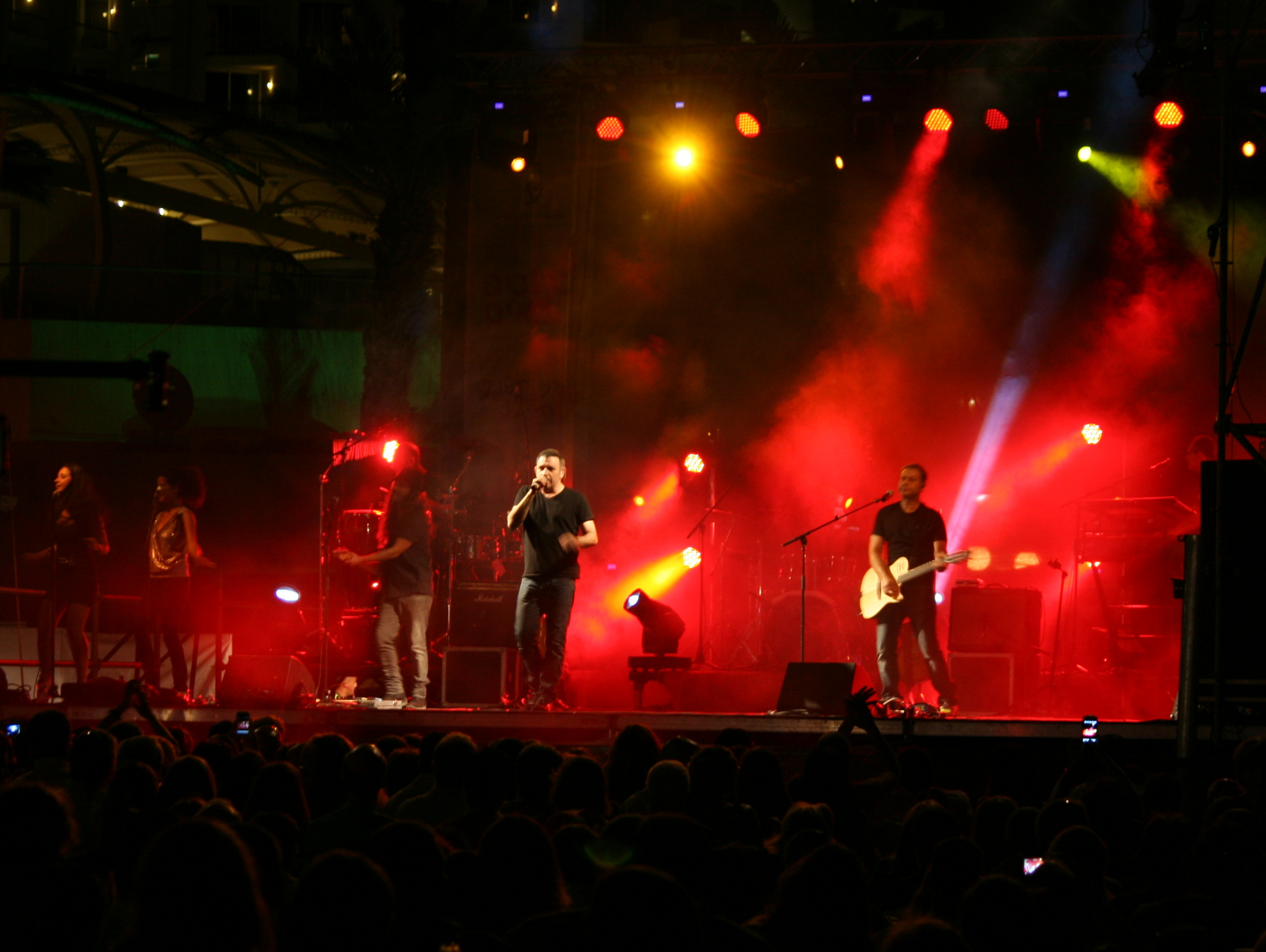

Background information
- Origin: Tel Aviv, Israel
- Genres: Synth-pop; new wave; mizrahi
- Years active: 1985—present
- Labels: Helicon; Sultan
- Members: Ze'ev Nechama; Tamir Kaliski; Gilad Pasternak; Gal Hadani; Yoram Poizner
- Past members: Yoed Nevo; Gil Alon
- Website: http://www.ethnix.co.il

Ethnix (Hebrew: אתניקס, stylized as Xאתני, [ˈetniks]) are an Israeli band mixing new wave music with oriental melodies. The band formed in 1989 as a collaboration between vocalist Ze'ev Nechama and keyboardist Tamir Kaliski, joined by drummer Gal Hadani and guitarist Gil Alon.

Nechama and Kaliski had originally formed a band called Moskva (Hebrew: מוסקבה, [moskˈva] - "Moscow"), making Ethnix the oldest continuously-operating band in Israel, together since 1985.

== History ==
The first album, Desert Bird, sold 40,000 copies. Their second album, Masala, sold over 60,000 copies in the first half-year of its release.

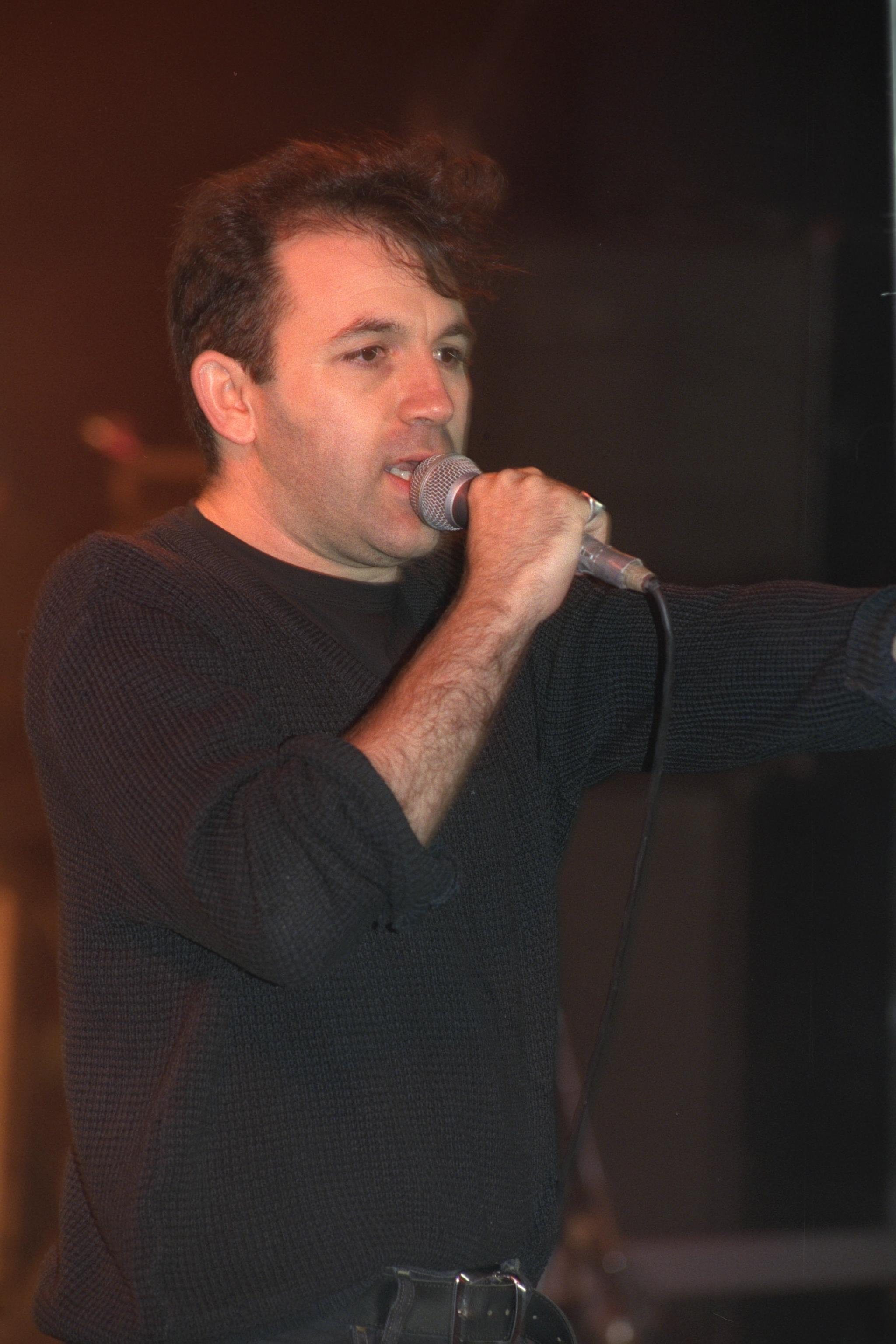
Ethnix lead singer Ze'ev Nechama

In 1996, guitarist/bassist Yoram Poizner joined. Albums include elements of rock, pop, dance, Mediterranean, and more. Ze'ev and Tamir, the main composers, created and produced for many more artists over the years, including Eyal Golan for whom they wrote three albums which helped propel him and the Mediterranean style to popularity. Other artists they have composed for include Sharon Haziz, Yehudah Keisar, Hagmalim, Izkis and Hayalei Hanekama.

On 2 July 2011, Ethnix had an open concert in Caesarea. During the show, it was announced that guitarist Gil Alon was leaving the band and would be replaced by Gilad Pasternak.

== Albums ==
- 1990 - Ethnix (Helicon)
- 1991 - Masala (Helicon)
- 1992 - Yelalat Tan (Helicon)
- 1993 - Adam V'Nahash (Helicon)
- 1994 - Atah (Helicon)
- 1995 - Haosef shel Ethnix (compilation) (Helicon)
- 1996 - Pop (Helicon)
- 1998 - Bruchim Habaim L'Yisrael (Helicon)
- 1999 - Morris (Sultan)
- 2000 - Hamofa Hameshutaf (live concert album with Eyal Golan) (Sultan)
- 2000 - Maximum Ethnix (compilation) (Helicon)
- 2001 - Baderech Shelach (Sultan)
- 2002 - 13 (Sultan)
- 2005 - America (Sultan)
- 2011 - Ga'aguim (Sultan)
- 2012 - Ahavat Chinam (Sultan)
- 2015 - HaTov Korah (Helicon)
- 2017 - Batouach (Helicon)
