= Ahavat chinam =

Jewish concept of loving others without preconditions

Ahavat chinam translates to "baseless love" and is a Jewish concept of loving others without preconditions, conditions or judgment. It is often contrasted with sinat chinam, or "baseless hatred," which is traditionally believed to have led to the destruction of the Second Temple in Jerusalem. Practicing ahavat chinam involves acts of kindness and giving, and it is a way to foster unity and bring about future redemption.

== Ahavat Chinam in literature ==
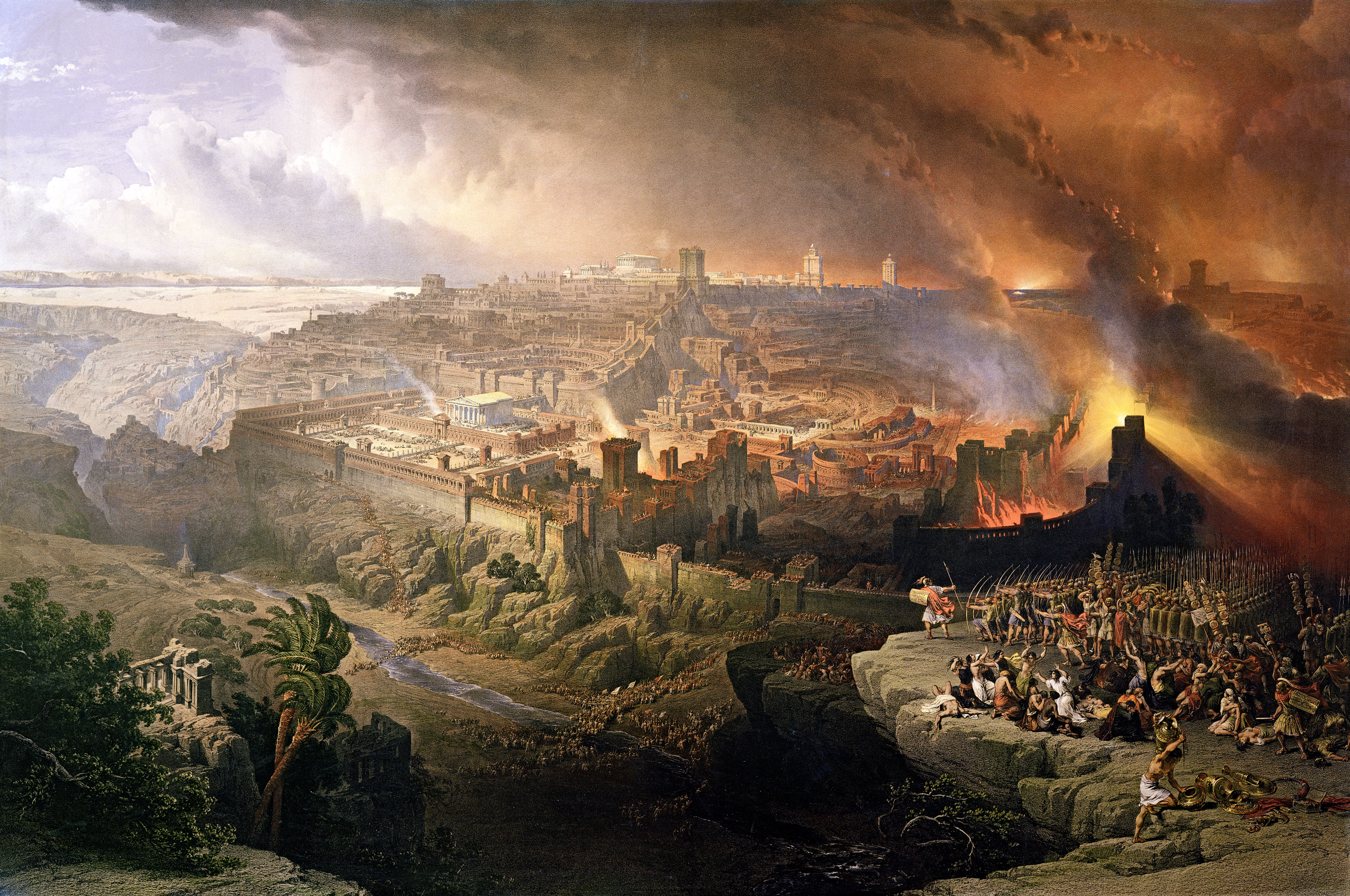
"If we were destroyed, and the world with us, due to baseless hatred, then we shall rebuild ourselves, and the world with us, with baseless love. Ahavat chinam." Rav Kook

The term ahavat chinam does not appear in the Talmud, whereas the term sinat chinam does. Is says in the Talmud that the Second Temple was destroyed because of baseless hatred. Although the expression ahavat chinam does not appear in classical rabbinic literature, several Midrashim emphasize interpersonal love, kindness, and unity as core religious ideals. Rabbi Akiva's teaching that "love your fellow as yourself" constitutes a foundational principle of the Torah presents unconditional love as a central value. Hillel the Elder, one of the leading sages of the late Second Temple period, taught that a person should "be of the disciples of Aharon. loving peace and pursuing peace". This teaching is further expanded in Avot de Rabbi Natan, which describes Aharon actively reconciling quarrels and fostering goodwill. The Talmud Yerushalmi interprets the command "do not hate your brother in your heart" as requiring open communication and rebuke to prevent hidden resentment, presenting interpersonal harmony as a religious obligation.

The concept is first articulated explicitly in the teachings of Rabbi Yechezkel Taub of Kuzmir (1778–1856), one of the early Chassidic leaders in Poland. In his work "Nechmad MiZahav", he connects the Talmudic statement that the Second Temple was destroyed because of sinat chinam (baseless hatred) with a positive theological imperative to cultivate ahavat chinam. Taub teaches that the essence of the future redemption depends on the internal unity of the Jewish people. Because the destruction came through hatred, he argues, the repair must come through freely given love. each Jew should love their fellow "without cause," simply because every Jew serves God. Through this unconditional love, he writes, the people of Israel can reverse the spiritual damage that led to exile and thereby bring about redemption. Taub’s formulation is one of the earliest known uses of the specific phrase ahavat chinam and provides the conceptual bridge between the Talmudic critique of baseless hatred and later interpretations that view redemptive love as its remedy.

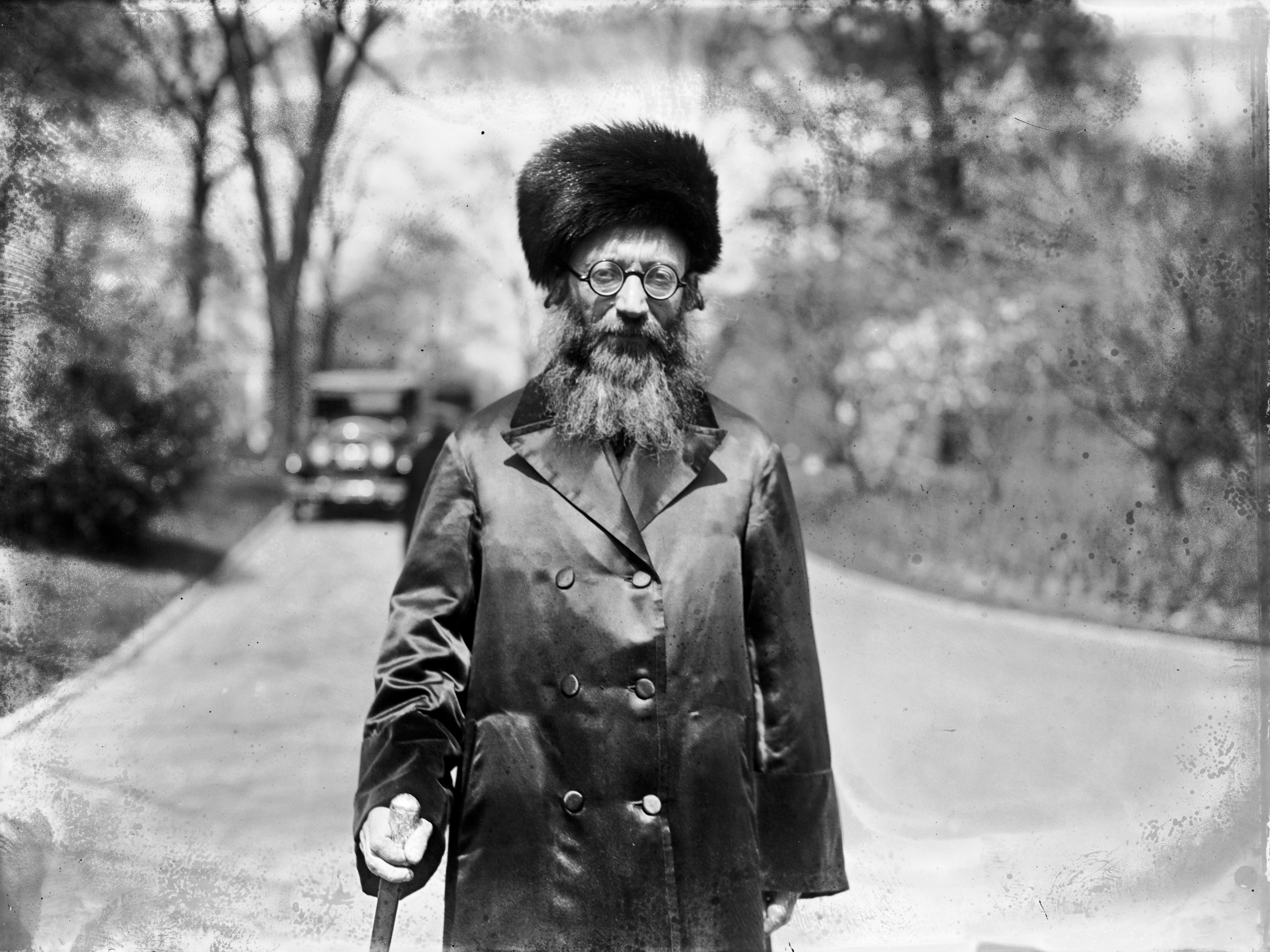
Rabbi Abraham Isaac Kook

The concept of ahavat chinam became widely known through Rabbi Abraham Isaac Kook (1865–1935), the first Ashkenazi Chief Rabbi of Mandatory Palestine, who emphasized spiritual and national renewal in his writings. In his book Orot HaKodesh, Rabbi Kook connected the Talmudic notion that the Second Temple was destroyed because of sinat chinam to a broader vision of communal and national redemption. He wrote: "If we were destroyed, and the world with us, due to baseless hatred, then we shall rebuild ourselves, and the world with us, with baseless love. Ahavat chinam." Through this formulation, Kook presented unconditional love as both a moral and spiritual imperative, applying the principle not only to interpersonal relationships but also to the collective unity and ethical revival of the Jewish people. His articulation reframed the traditional rabbinic warning about hatred into a constructive program: love, freely given, could serve as the basis for spiritual renewal and, ultimately, redemption. Kook’s teachings helped popularize the phrase, and it subsequently became influential in Religious Zionist thought, as well as in Jewish educational and communal discourse in the 20th century.

== Ahavat Chinam in contemporary culture ==
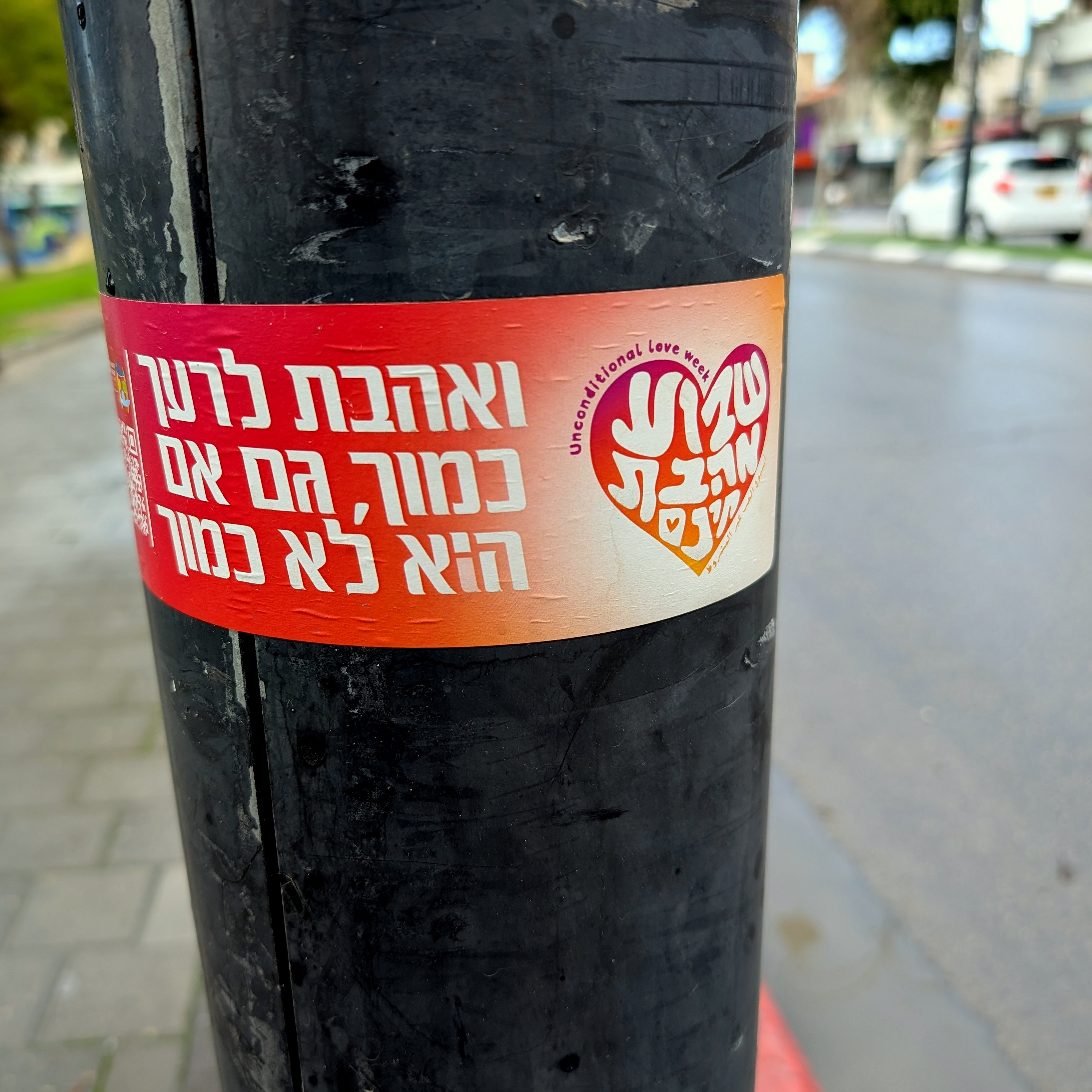
Ahavat Chinam in Jewish cultural discourse: Week of baseless love. Sticker on a pole. Rehovot, Israel

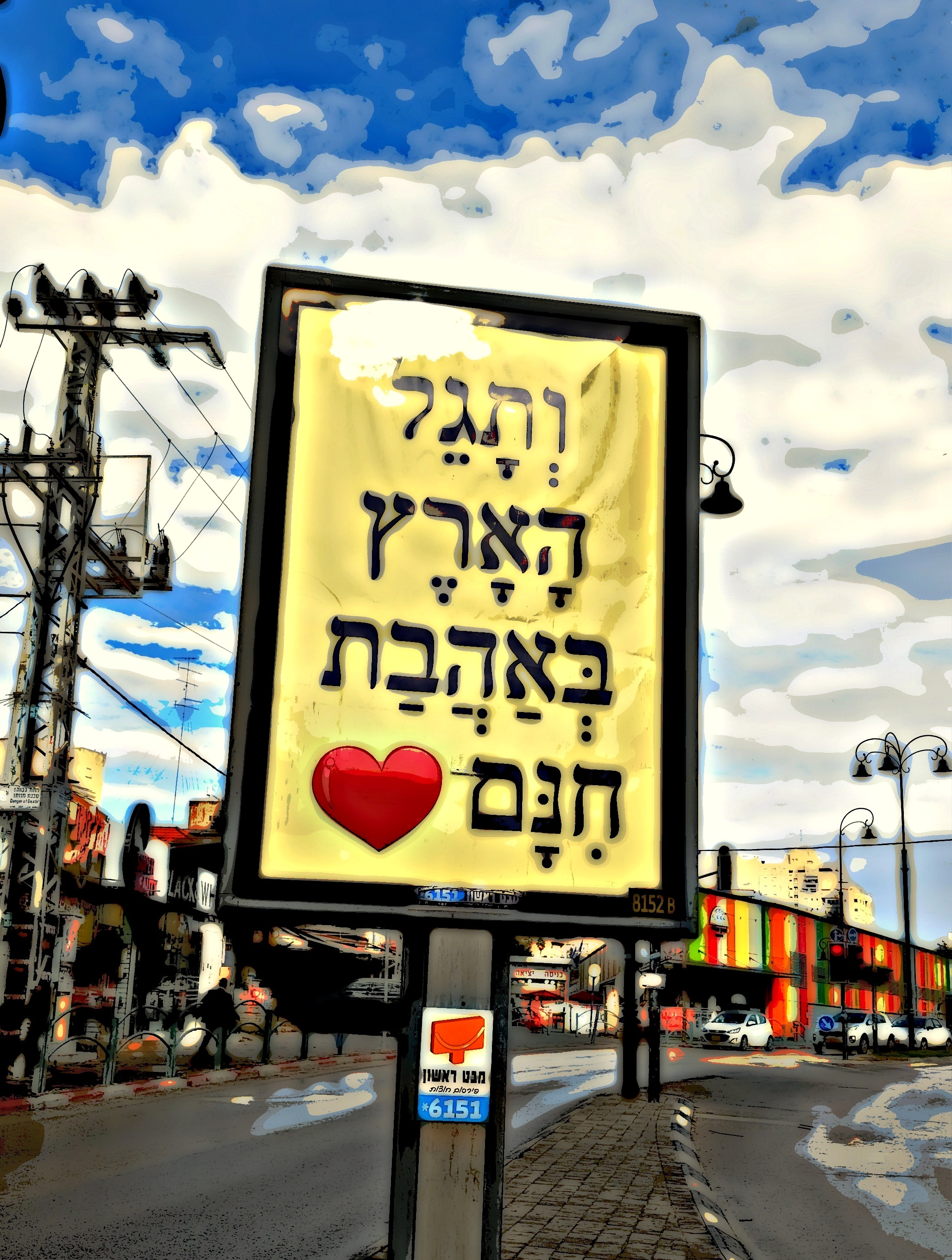
Ahavat Chinam in Jewish cultural discourse: And the land will rejoice in baseless love. Street sign. Rehovot, Israel.

The idea of ahavat chinam has entered modern Jewish cultural discourse, especially in educational, communal, and public campaigns that promote social cohesion. The phrase is commonly referenced in sermons, youth movement programming, and community initiatives that emphasize reducing internal division within Jewish society. It is also invoked during the period leading up to Tisha B’Av, when themes related to the destruction of the Temple and mutual responsibility are discussed. In Israel, the term has been used in public campaigns, social projects, and cultural events that aim to encourage civility and solidarity among diverse groups. Writers, and public figures occasionally draw on the concept in essays, speeches, and media commentary as a counterpoint to contemporary political or social tensions. Musicians have also incorporated the theme of ahavat chinam into their work. Notable examples include artists such as Ethnix, Lazer Lold, Yehudah Katz, Yitzhak Attias, and Reva L'Sheva, whose songs or public statements reference the concept in the context of social unity. Visual artists and curators have also explored the theme of ahavat chinam in contemporary art. Although these uses vary widely in context, ahavat chinam often functions as a cultural symbol representing ideals of unity and mutual respect.
