= Lazer Lloyd =

American singer and songwriter

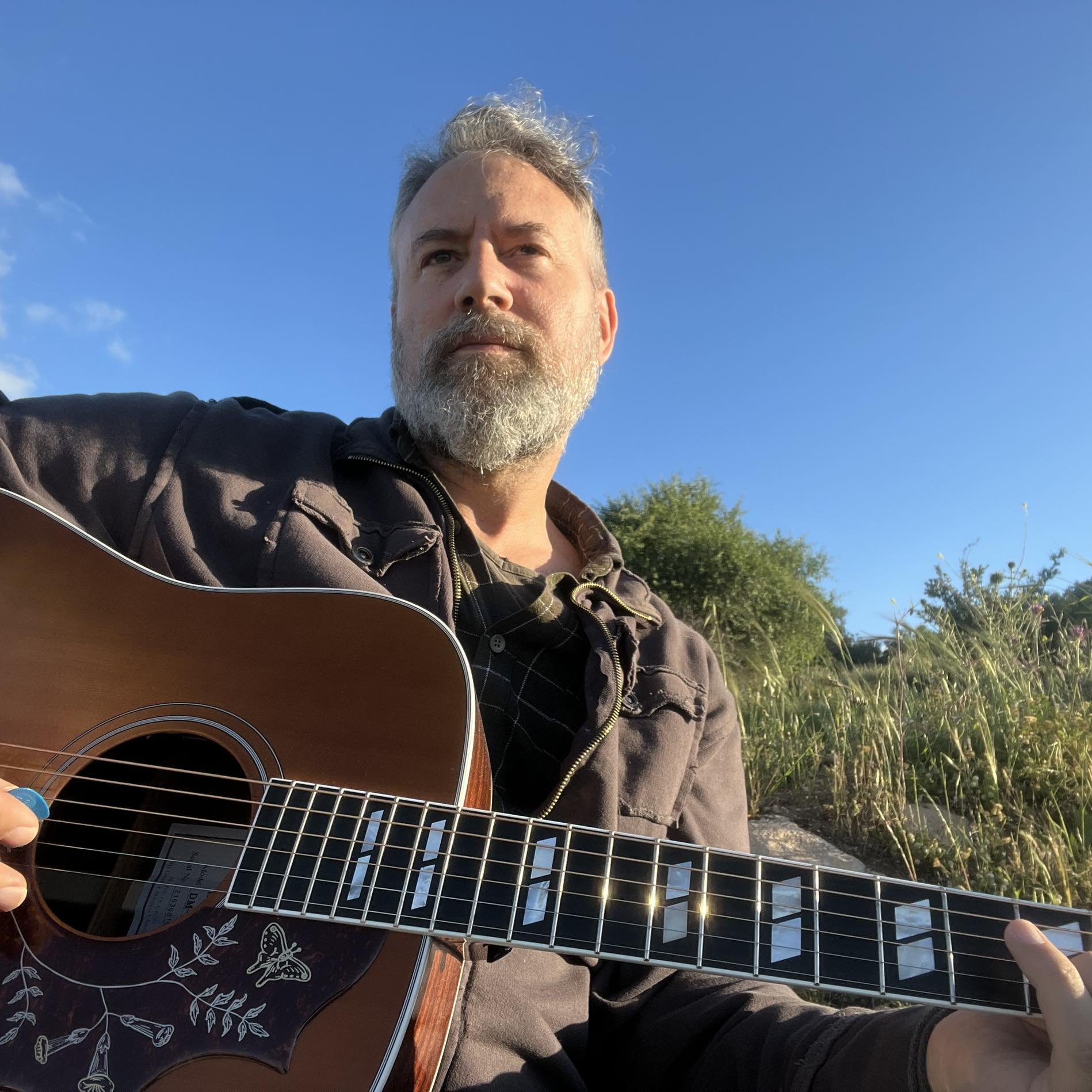
- Lazer Lloyd, 2022

Background information
- Born: Lloyd Paul (Lazer Pinchas) Blumen; May 7, 1966 (age 60); New York City
- Genres: Rock, Americana, folk, blues rock, psychedelic rock, blues
- Occupations: Singer, songwriter, guitarist
- Instruments: Vocals, guitar, harmonica, piano
- Years active: 1981–present
- Label: Lots of Love Records
- Website: lazerlloyd.live

Lazer Lloyd (born Lloyd Paul Blumen; May 7, 1966) is an American singer, songwriter, and guitarist. Lloyd's music is a mix of acoustic and electric Americana, rock, folk, blues and psychedelic styles with lyrics touching on life, love, and struggle. He performs throughout the United States and Canada, the United Kingdom, Europe, and Brazil, both in person and through social media.

Born in the United States, Lloyd moved to Israel in his 20s, where he played guitar for the influential Jewish rock band Reva L'Sheva. Following the band's breakup, he fronted the blues rock trio Yood before starting his own solo singer-songwriter career.

== Early life ==
Lloyd was born in New York City in 1966 and grew up in Madison, Connecticut and Berkeley Heights, New Jersey. He began playing guitar at age of 13. His first band formed in his teens, Legacy, played covers of 1950s rock and roll. They played at a 1982 battle of the bands at Daniel Hand High School and toured throughout Connecticut, New York, and New Jersey, including opening for Michael Bolton at Toad's Place in New Haven.

He attended Skidmore College, where he studied music under Milt Hinton, Randy Brecker, and Gene Bertoncini. Lazer cites B. B. King speaking in a master class about keeping his large band together for many years, by looking for good people first and considering their musicianship second as a source of inspiration to him as a young man."

== Career ==
=== The Last Mavericks ===
Upon graduating from Skidmore, Lloyd returned to Connecticut and formed a blues rock band called the Last Mavericks, which he later described as "Stevie Ray Vaughan meets Bruce with a bit of a grunge sound". After moving to New York in the early 1990s, the band recorded a demo for Atlantic Records, who subsequently offered Lloyd a chance to record a solo record in Nashville, Tennessee with producer Garry Tallent of the E Street Band. During this time, he also opened for artists like Prince, Johnny Winter, and Randy Brecker.

During the negotiation period for the record, Lloyd was playing guitar in Central Park when he met a homeless man who told him about singer-songwriter Rabbi Shlomo Carlebach and invited Lloyd to perform with the rabbi at a synagogue in Manhattan. At the concert, Lloyd was struck by Carlebach's warmth and talent as well as his willingness to embrace Lloyd's roots rock and blues style into his more traditional Jewish musical style. Lloyd was fascinated by the use of the flat five chords, which appear in both blues and traditional Jewish music. The two became friends, and Carlebach ultimately persuaded Lloyd to fly to Israel to play with him. Rabbi Carlebach passed away three months later (October 1994) and never made it back to Israel to join the young musician. Lloyd ended up settling. He became a baal teshuva and studied at Dvar Yerushalayim and Kfar Chabad.

=== Reva L'Sheva and Yood ===
Lloyd joined the band Reva L'Sheva in 1996, replacing founding member David "Harpo" Abramson. Releasing six albums, the band was credited with inspiring a post-Carlebach style of jam band-influenced Jewish rock played by bands like Moshav, Soulfarm, and Blue Fringe. During their tenure, they were promoted by radio host Ehud Manor and appeared on Army Radio and Channel 1. They disbanded in 2004, although they returned for a concert at Zappa Jerusalem in 2014.

In 2005, he and bassist Yaakov "Dr. Jake" Lefcoe co-founded the blues rock band Yood, although the group had been in development since 2000. Acquiring drummer Moshe Yankovsky, they debuted at Mike's Place in 2006 and released two albums, Passin'over (2007) and Real People (2008). They also played the Beit Shemesh Festival and gave a Chabad-sponsored college tour in the United States.

=== Solo career ===
After releasing some albums as Eliezer Blumen in the early 2000s, Lloyd recorded the album Higher Ground in 2004 with Ofir Leibovitz of the Israeli rock band Nikmat HaTraktor.

Lloyd opened for British blues guitarist Snowy White at a 2011 performance in Tel Aviv. Among those in attendance were rock singer Shalom Hanoch and radio DJ Ben Rad of 88FM, the latter of whom subsequently began playing Lloyd's music frequently. That same year, Lloyd released three new albums: the all-Hebrew album Haneshama, the acoustic album Lazer Lloyd Unplugged, and the live album Blues in Tel Aviv, as well as a concert DVD called Lazer Lloyd Live From Israel.

In 2012, he released the electric blues album My Own Blues and collaborated with singer David Orbach on the album King of Blues.

Lloyd released a second acoustic album, Lost on the Highway, through Blues Leaf Records in August 2013. In October, as part of the Jewish Unity Music Project, he released a music video called "Ha'am Sheli" ("My People"), featuring vocals from Israeli singers Gad Elbaz, Shlomo Katz, Aharon Razel, and Naftali Kalfa. The following summer, he embarked on a North American tour, including a Canadian tour with members of the Downchild Blues Band and a US tour with members of the Chicago Blues Kings.

=== Lots of Love records ===
In 2015, he released his first internationally distributed album, the self-titled Lazer Lloyd, which included eleven of his own original songs and a cover of Otis Redding's "(Sittin' On) The Dock of the Bay", through Chicago's Lots of Love Records. The album reached No. 4 on Roots Music Report's blues albums chart, while the singles "Burning Thunder" and "Broken Dreams" reached No. 1 and No. 7 on the blues singles chart, respectively.

In 2016, Lloyd released two CDs for sale on the road, Guitar Jams and The Moose is Loose (a live concert recorded at a Moose International Lodge in Kankakee, Illinois). These road CDs were followed by a major 2017 international digital and physical release with his Freedom's Child album. The Freedom's Child album gained 150 points on the Americana Music Association chart in the first 28 days after release. Lazer's instrumental "Esquecas Do Mundo (Forget the World)" has become a beloved track with Brazilian & UK fans with millions of views on YouTube and thousands of comments.

Lots of Love Records released a self-standing Lazer Lloyd vocal and guitar solo single "Backstreets" recorded in one take in New Haven, CT during a visit to his parents while on tour. The song was picked up by the Acoustic Blues playlist on Spotify and will soon hit a million streams on Spotify.

In 2020 Lloyd released his eleventh solo album, Tomorrow Never Comes, recorded in Nashville with Eric Paul (Townes van Zandt, Willie Nelson), in Wimberley, Texas with producer/engineer Chris Bell (Don Henley, Eagles, Eric Johnson), and in Memphis, Tennessee. The band for the album included Michael Rojas on keyboards, Michael Spriggs on rhythm guitar, Eddie Bayers on drums, and bass players Mark Fain and Eli Beaird.

== Artistry ==
Lloyd has been noted for playing blues with Arabic tunings, what he has described as "a combination of Mississippi and Moroccan tuning". He compared the sound of his self-titled album to "playing an old Robert Johnson guitar together with an Egyptian oud." In particular, his cover of "Dock of the Bay" is played with a tuning of DADADD, which he describes as "half-oud/half-guitar" tuning that adds "an Arabic/new-age touch."

Lloyd's music also incorporates a wide range of genres, including Americana, blues rock, folk, psychedelic music, jam band, and jazz. (Note: Extensive information on the formation of Lazer Lloyd's style and songwriting range including musical examples is available on his website http://lazerlloyd.com) Critics have noted his skill as a lyricist, able to elevate life's joys and struggles into inspirational material.

== Music and spirituality ==
Lazer's spirituality and love of people is rooted in his early life at home where his family participated in the national A Better Chance program. Lloyd grew up in a house full of kids from all backgrounds all sharing music and family in a warm caring environment. Lazer's mother was instrumental in starting the first Reform Temple in Madison, CT. "Music was always being played in our home" according to his father, Joel' (Note: personal correspondence quote from Joel Blumen), who introduced him to blues, folk, rock, and jazz music, and took him to concerts by George Benson, Carlos Santana, and Stevie Ray Vaughan, inspiring him to pursue music. Lazer met and was inspired to move to Israel by folk-singer and spiritual guide Rabbi Shlomo Carlebach through a chance encounter with Rabbi Chaim Shimon Wahrman at the Millinery Center Synagogue in New York City. Lazer often tells the story at shows as an example of the potential importance and positive impact of every person and experience in our lives.

== Equipment ==
Lloyd's first guitar was a Fender Lead Bullet 3 bought at Manny's Music in New York, and he played mostly Telecasters throughout college. He enjoys searching for vintage guitars on the road and regularly changes his main instrument – often working on upgrades and improvements before trading on to the next guitar. In addition to maintaining his carefully curated collection of guitars, Lloyd often plays LaGrange Guitars – an Israeli luthier which endorses him and makes guitars to his specifications. Lazer Lloyd uses D'addario strings on his guitars.

== Discography ==
=== Solo albums ===
- For Zion (L'ma'an Tzion) (as Eliezer Blumen) (Gal Paz, 2000)
- A New Song (Shi Chadash) (as Eliezer Blumen) (Gal Paz, 2000)
- Straight to You (Yashar Alecha) (as Eliezer Blumen) (Gal Paz, 2002)
- Higher Ground (independent, 2004)
- As the River's Flow (as Eliezer Blumen) (2008)
- Haneshama (2011)
- King of Blues (with David Orbach) (2012)
- My Own Blues (2012)
- Insides Out (Lots of Love, 2014)
- Lazer Lloyd (Lots of Love, 2015)
- Guitar Jams (Lots of Love, 2016)
- Freedom's Child (Lots of Love, 2017)
- Tomorrow Never Comes (Lots of Love, 2020)

==== Live and acoustic albums ====
- Lazer Lloyd Unplugged (2011; acoustic)
- Blues in Tel Aviv (2011; live)
- Lost on the Highway (Blues Leaf, 2013; acoustic)
- The Moose is Loose: Live at the Kankakee Moose Lodge (Lots of Love, 2016; live)

==== Singles ====
- "Ha'am Sheli (My People)" (2013)
- "Moroccan Woman" (2014)
- "Broken Dreams" (2015)
- "Burning Thunder" (2015)
- "America" (2017)
- "Love After The Flood" (2017)
- "Backstreets" (2017)

=== With Reva L'Sheva ===
- Higia HaZman (Voices Along the Path, 1996)
- Kumu (Noam Hafakot, 1998)
- Etz Chaim Hee (Voices Along the Path, 1999)
- Ahavat Chinam (Mayim/Welcome Music, 2001)
- 10: Live (Noam Hafakot, 2004)
- V'Sham Nashir (Noam Hafakot, 2005)

=== With Yood ===
- Passin'over (2007)
- Real People (2008)
