= TravelCenters of America =

American truck stop and travel center company

TravelCenters of America LLC

- TA travel center near Knoxville, Tennessee (I-75) (2026)
- Type: Subsidiary
- Traded as: Nasdaq: TA
- Industry: Truck stops
- Founded: 1972; 54 years ago
- Headquarters: Westlake, Ohio, United States
- Number of locations: 272 (2021)
- Areas served: United States
- Key people: Debi Boffa (CEO); Barry Richards (president); Peter J. Crage (EVP, CFO, treasurer)
- Brands: Petro Stopping Centers; TA Express; TA; TravelCenters of America; GOASIS; Country Pride; Iron Skillet
- Revenue: US$ 6.1 billion (2019)
- Number of employees: 20,259 (2018)
- Parent: BP
- Divisions: TA Restaurant Group; TA Truck Service
- Website: ta-petro.com

TravelCenters of America LLC is a full-service truck stop and travel center company in the United States. The company operates full service centers, convenience stores, and restaurants under the TravelCenters of America brands TA, Petro Stopping Centers, TA Express, and GOASIS. TravelCenters of America is headquartered in Westlake, Ohio, operates in 44 U.S. states, and employs nearly 20,000 people, as of 2021.

In May 2023, BP acquired the company.

== Description and corporate affairs ==
TravelCenters of America (TA) is an operator of truck stops and travel centers in the United States, with approximately 270 full-service locations along the Interstate Highway System in 44 U.S. states and in Canada, plus standalone restaurants in more than 10 states, as of 2018. The publicly traded limited liability company is headquartered in Westlake, Ohio and employs nearly 20,000 people.

Divisions of TA include TA Restaurant Group and TA Truck Service. Brands include TravelCenters of America, TA, and Petro Stopping Centers; approximately 40 restaurants generally operate under the Quaker Steak & Lube brand. Together, these brands offer diesel fuel and gasoline, full service and fast food restaurants, maintenance and repair service for trucks, and groceries and convenience goods, among other products and services. (TA) divested Quaker Steak & Lube in April 2021 to an undisclosed buyer for $5 million.

Jon Pertchik became chief executive officer (CEO) in 2019. Barry Richards is president, and in 2020, Peter J. Crage was named executive vice president (EVP), chief financial officer (CFO), and treasurer.

== History ==
TravelCenters of America was established by Phil Saunders in 1972 as Truckstops of America. The company was among the first truck stop chains in the nation, and was purchased by Ryder later that year. Standard Oil of Ohio acquired the chain in 1984. After Standard Oil of Ohio was purchased by BP, the multinational oil and gas company sold TA to Clipper Group in 1993. The chain merged with National Auto/Truckstops in 1997, resulting in the new name TravelCenters of America Inc. (TA). In the late 1990s.The National Auto/Truckstops was historically rooted to the Pure Oil Company, which began its truck stop business in the 1950s. Post the acquisition of Pure Oil by The Union Oil of California in 1965 and Auto/Truckstops outlets were rebranded as 76 stations. Post 1997 the former National Auto/Truckstops removed their 76 branding. TA purchased seventeen Burns Bros. Travel Stops, then merged with over a dozen units of Travel Ports of America. By 2000, the company had 160 locations in 40 U.S. states, 12,500 employees, and annual sales of $1.5 billion. TA was acquired by Oak Hill Capital Partners in 2000.

TA ranked #94 and #60 on Forbes' list of the largest private companies in 2005 and 2006, respectively. In 2006, Hospitality Properties Trust (HPT) agreed to acquire the company for approximately $1.9 billion. The acquisition was completed in January 2007, and TA shares started being traded on the American Stock Exchange on February 1. TA continued operating as a fully owned subsidiary of HPT, which continued to be TA's largest shareholder, as of mid 2015. In May 2007, TA acquired the operating businesses of the El Paso-based Petro Stopping Centers, and leased 40 Petro locations from HPT.

RDG Capital Management encouraged TA to implement a $100 million share repurchase plan in 2015 to increase its stock price, in addition to leasing and selling more company-owned properties. TA elected to sign an approximately $400 million sale leaseback deal with HPT. In mid 2016, the company's board of directors rejected a buyout submitted by the private equity firm Golden Gate Capital in December 2015. The offer was for $14 per share, valuing TA at $540 million. TA filed a lawsuit against Comdata in November in response to the payment processor provider's allegations that TA breached agreements. The Delaware Court of Chancery ordered Comdata to abide by contract terms and reimburse TA for excess fees charged since February 2017, plus interest and attorney's fees. The court's final ruling is pending, as of March 2018. On May 4, 2015, TA bought 54 stores in Missouri and Kansas from GasMart USA.

During 2015–2017, TA remodeled 56 Minit Mart and 24 Petro or TA locations. The company has also focused on providing truckers with electronic logging devices, following a mandate issued by the Federal Motor Carrier Safety Administration in 2015. TA ranked number 17 in CSP magazine's late 2017 list of the largest U.S. convenience store chains. The company was also recognized by the Women's Forum of New York for having a board with 40 percent female representation. In November 2017, president and CEO Thomas O'Brien announced his resignation effective December 31. The board promoted Barry Richards, then serving as EVP, to the president and chief operating officer role, and named William Myers, who held the senior vice president and chief accounting officer position, to EVP, CFO and treasurer. Adam Portnoy replaced O'Brien as the board's managing director. Andrew Rebholz became CEO in early 2018, having previously been EVP, CFO, and treasurer. TA sold its Minit Mart brand by the end of 2018.

TA partnered with Wex in February 2018 to provide fuel card services to all TA and Petro locations throughout the U.S. The company also confirmed sponsorship of the "truck service challenge" competition for the Monster Energy NASCAR Cup Series and NASCAR Xfinity Series. TA expanded its Westlake headquarters in March 2017 by purchasing a nearby building.

In December 2019, Jon Pertchik was appointed as chief executive officer upon Andrew Rebholz's resignation.

TA fundraises for the St. Christopher Truckers Development and Relief Fund, which helps truck drivers who struggle financially as the result of health issues, annually since 2010. The company is the fund's largest contributor. The company has been included on the Fortune 500 list for ten years, and ranks #470, as of 2018.

TA previously operated a single Canadian travel center in Woodstock, Ontario, but the company closed that location in 2022, leaving it with solely a U.S. presence.

In January 2023, TA and Electrify America announced a partnership to install 1,000 electric vehicle fast charging stations at roughly 200 TA and Petro branded locations. The installations are planned to begin in 2023 and occur over the next five years.

In February 2023, it was announced that BP had reached an agreement to purchase TA for $1.3 billion in cash. The acquisition finalized in May 2023.

== Divisions ==
=== TA Restaurant Group ===
TA Restaurant Group, a division of TravelCenters of America LLC, had 43 national and regional restaurant brands and approximately 6,200 employees, as of April 2016. The division operates around 850 restaurants and food stores branded as Country Pride, Iron Skillet, and Quaker Steak & Lube, among others. In the aftermath of the COVID-19 pandemic, many locations have closed their full service sit down restaurants.

TA completed its purchase of the Quaker Steak & Lube restaurant chain in April 2016. There are approximately 40 Quaker Steak & Lube restaurants in 12 states, as of 2021. Quaker Steak & Lube continues to focus on franchise development.

=== TA Truck Service ===
A TravelCenters of America truck service and maintenance facility

The TA Truck Service division offers truck maintenance and repair facilities nationwide. The TA Truck Service Commercial Tire Network was unveiled in November 2016, and includes around 1,000 truck service repair shops, approximately 3,000 truck service technicians, and around 2,000 roadside assistance and maintenance vehicles, as of September 2017. It is considered the nation's largest independent commercial tire dealer.

In 2017, TA created the "TA Certified" label, and partnered with auction companies to certify used truck conditions before being sold. The TA Truck Service National Call Center and Emergency Road Side Assistance operations were relocated to a new facility in Westlake in September 2017. The facility houses other TA customer support staff.
