= Crocker Park =

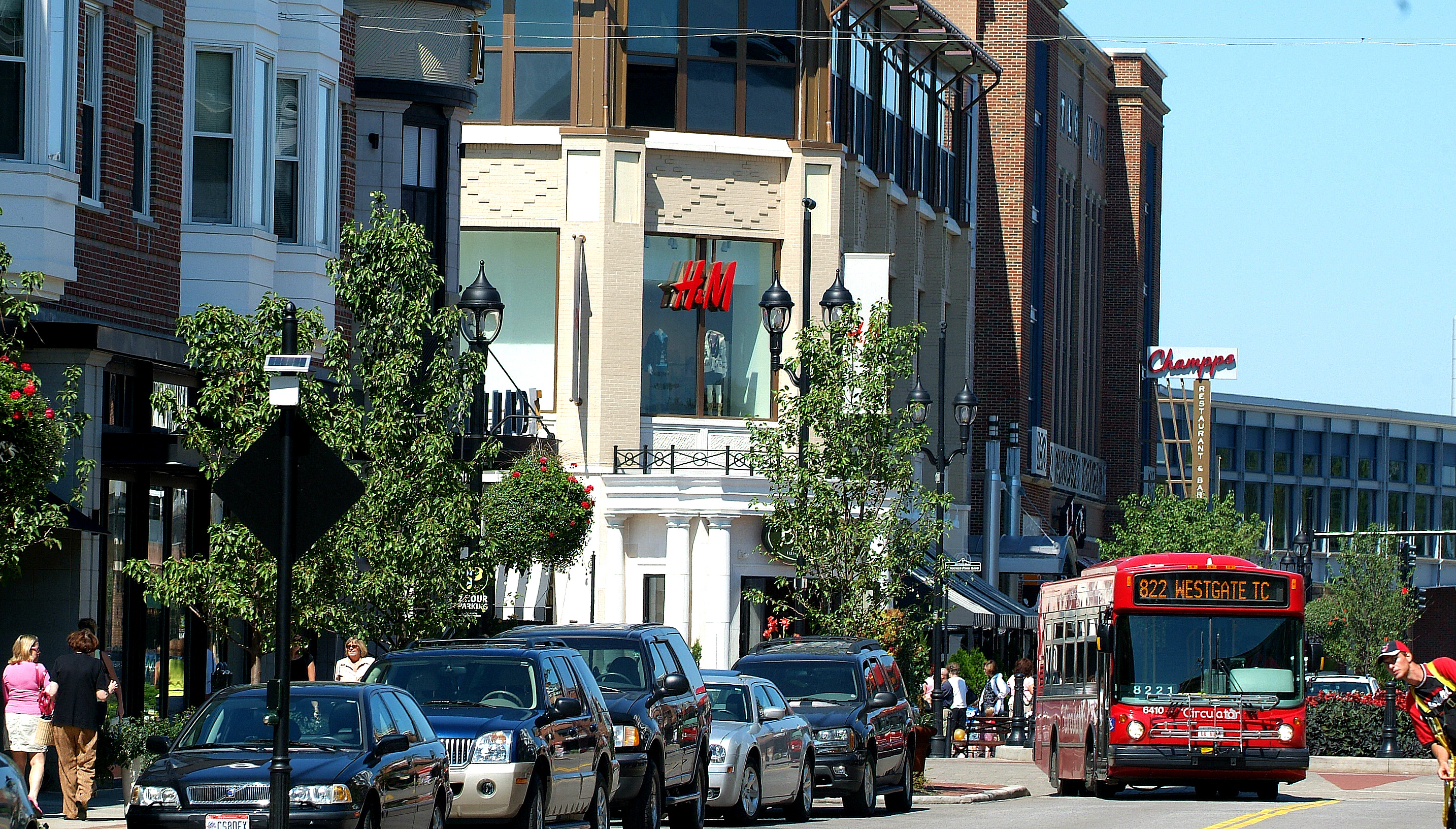
- Location: Westlake, Ohio, United States
- Coordinates: 41.46°N 81.95°W
- Address: 177 Market St
- Opened: October 29, 2004; 22 years ago
- Developer: Robert L. Stark Enterprises
- Manager: Robert L. Stark Enterprises
- Owner: Robert L. Stark Enterprises
- Architect: Bialosky and Partners Architects
- Num. of stores: 100+
- Num. of anchor tenants: 4
- Floor area: 1,050,000 sq ft (98,000 m^{2})
- Floors: 1
- Public transit: RTA: 26, 55C
- Website: crockerpark.com

Crocker Park is a lifestyle center and mixed-use development in Westlake, Ohio, United States. With the first phase opened in 2004, the center comprises 1,050,000 sq ft (98,000 m^{2}) of retail, 650 residential units, and 100,000 sq ft (9,300 m^{2}) of office space.

== History ==
The $200 million project was developed by Stark Enterprises and The Carney Foundation. It features restaurants, retailers, residential, and entertainment. The project also includes office space.

The first phase opened October 29, 2004. Upon opening, it comprised a lifestyle center featuring Barnes & Noble and Dick's Sporting Goods.

Borders vacated the center in 2011 and was replaced by a Nordstrom Rack in 2013. The final phase, which was completed in 2014, includes a new corporate headquarters for American Greetings. During the construction of the American Greetings headquarters building, on March 10, 2016, a propane tank ignited and exploded, creating a large fireball that towered over buildings and a blast that could be heard from over a mile away. There were no injuries reported, and no cause was determined. In August 2024, Macy's opened their first small format store in the Promenade, in the former Bed Bath & Beyond. In April 2025, Dick's Sporting Goods relocated to adjacent Avon, Ohio, following the conclusion of their 20 year lease.
