= Reva L'Sheva =

Israeli Jewish rock band

Reva L'Sheva רבע לשבע
- Origin: Jerusalem, Israel
- Genres: Jewish rock, folk rock, world music, soul, jam band
- Years active: 1994–2006, 2014
- Past members: Yehudah Katz; Nitzan Chen Razel; Chanan Elias; Lazer Lloyd; Yitzhak Attias; David "Harpo" Abramson; Brian Levine; Danny Roth; Adam Wexler
- Website: www.revalesheva.com

Reva L'Sheva (Hebrew: רבע לשבע, "a quarter to seven") was an Israeli Jewish rock band formed in 1994 by lead singer Yehudah Katz.

They released six studio albums before disbanding around 2006. On January 7, 2014, the band performed at Zappa Jerusalem, their first show in seven years, and stated that they were open to recording another album together.

== Members ==
The original line-up was Yehudah Katz, David "Harpo" Abramson, Adam Wexler, Zvi Yechezkeli and Avi Yishai.

- Yehudah Katz is from New York, but spent a lot of time in Los Angeles before moving to Israel. He is a self-described "close student" of Rabbi Shlomo Carlebach, with whom he studied for 23 years. He plays guitar and sings.
- Adam Wexler grew up in Minneapolis and immigrated to Israel in 1990. He plays bass and guitar. Wexler was formerly a member of the Diaspora Yeshiva Band.
- David "Harpo" Abramson immigrated to Israel in 1969. Following a stint in the army, he returned to the U.S., but came back to Israel in 1991. Abramson died in fall 2010. He played guitar, harmonica and sings.
- Lazer Lloyd (Eliezer Blumen) joined Reva L'Sheva after making Aliyah to Israel. Blumen replaced founding member "Harpo" and toured with the band for a decade starting in 1996. Lazer Lloyd performs as a solo artist singer/songwriter and guitarist.
- Zvi Yechezkeli was born in Jerusalem and studied in New York. He considers himself not religious. He is a percussionist.
- Avi Yishai is the drummer.

== Musical style ==
The band is heavily influenced by 1970s rock and roll groups such as the Grateful Dead, Bob Dylan, and by Jewish artists such as Carlebach.

== Discography ==
Studio albums

- Come Close (Voices Along the Path, 1993)
- Higia HaZman ("The Time Has Come") (Voices Along the Path, 1996)
- Kumu ("Arise") (Noam Hafakot, 1998)
- Etz Chaim Hee: Secrets (Voices Along the Path, 1999)
- Ahavat Chinam: One Love (Mayim/Welcome Music, 2001)
- V'Sham Nashir ("There We Will Sing") (Noam Hafakot, 2005)

Live albums

- 10: Live (Noam Hafakot, 2004)

== See also ==
- Moshav (band)
