= Westlake, Ohio =

City in the United States

- City
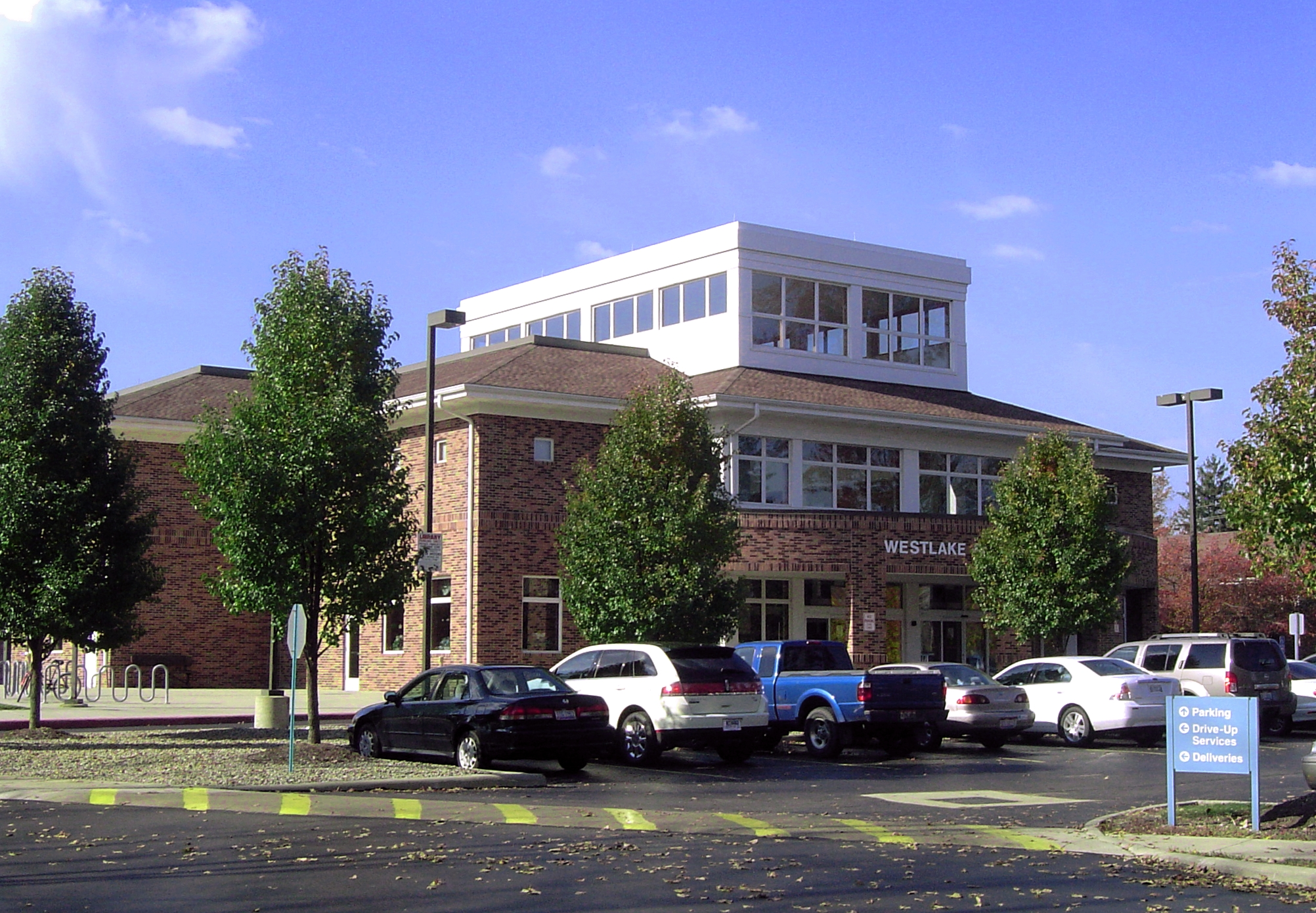
- Westlake Porter Public Library

- Seal
- Motto: Pride, tradition, community
- Interactive map of Westlake, Ohio
- Location within Ohio Location within the United States
- Coordinates: 41°27′16″N 81°55′43″W
- Country: United States
- State: Ohio
- County: Cuyahoga
- Settled: October 10, 1810
- Incorporated: 1911 (village); 1957 (city)

Government
  - Type: Mayor-council
  - Mayor: Dennis M. Clough (R)

Area
  - Total: 15.94 sq mi (41.28 km^{2})
  - Land: 15.93 sq mi (41.27 km^{2})
  - Water: 0.0039 sq mi (0.01 km^{2}) 0%
- Elevation: 709 ft (216 m)

Population (2020)
  - Total: 34,228
  - Density: 2,148.2/sq mi (829.44/km^{2})
- Time zone: UTC−5 (EST)
  - Summer (DST): UTC−4 (EDT)
- ZIP Code: 44145
- Area code: 440
- FIPS code: 39-83622
- GNIS feature ID: 1061762
- Website: www.cityofwestlake.org

Westlake is a city in Cuyahoga County, Ohio, United States. It is a suburb located 12 miles (19 km) west of downtown Cleveland. The population was 34,228 at the 2020 census.

== History ==
The area now known as the city of Westlake was first settled by European Americans on October 10, 1810. At the time, it was part of Dover Township.

In 1901, the northern part of the township seceded to form Bay Village. In 1912, a southern portion left to join North Olmsted. The remaining township residents formed Dover Village in 1913, taking with it a portion of Olmsted Township.

In order to avoid confusion with the city of Dover in Tuscarawas County, Dover Village was renamed Westlake in 1940. The village of Westlake became a city in 1957.

In September 1966, a house in Westlake which had recently been bought by John R. Compton, a black pastor, was firebombed. No one was injured, although the bombing did cause around $10,000 of damage, equivalent to $99,231 in 2025. According to the Cleveland Press, the mayor of Westlake, Alexander R. Roman, "criticized the parties involved in the sale of the home... He said no one was notified so the community could be prepared to accept a Negro family."

== Geography ==
Westlake is located at 41°27′16″N 81°55′43″W (41.454439, −81.928657).

According to the United States Census Bureau, the city has a total area of 15.93 square miles (41.26 km^{2}), all land.

== Demographics ==
Historical population
Census	Pop.	Note	%±
1920	1,754		—
1930	2,453		39.9%
1940	3,200		30.5%
1950	4,912		53.5%
1960	12,906		162.7%
1970	15,689		21.6%
1980	19,475		24.1%
1990	27,018		38.7%
2000	31,719		17.4%
2010	32,729		3.2%
2020	34,228		4.6%

=== Racial and ethnic composition ===
Westlake city, Ohio – Racial and ethnic composition Note: the US Census treats Hispanic/Latino as an ethnic category. This table excludes Latinos from the racial categories and assigns them to a separate category. Hispanics/Latinos may be of any race.
Race / Ethnicity (NH = Non-Hispanic)	Pop 2000	Pop 2010	Pop 2020	% 2000	% 2010	% 2020
White alone (NH)	29,199	29,279	29,020	92.06%	89.46%	84.78%
Black or African American alone (NH)	299	498	773	0.94%	1.52%	2.26%
Native American or Alaska Native alone (NH)	18	15	16	0.06%	0.05%	0.05%
Asian alone (NH)	1,325	1,595	1,963	4.18%	4.87%	5.74%
Native Hawaiian or Pacific Islander alone (NH)	4	18	9	0.01%	0.05%	0.03%
Other race alone (NH)	26	40	146	0.08%	0.12%	0.43%
Mixed race or Multiracial (NH)	446	472	1,144	1.41%	1.44%	3.34%
Hispanic or Latino (any race)	402	812	1,157	1.27%	2.48%	3.38%
Total	31,719	32,729	34,228	100.00%	100.00%	100.00%

=== Income ===
The median income for a household in the city was $72,917, and the median income for a family was $98,223 (these figures had changed to $63,252 and $90,397 respectively as of a 2007 estimate). Males had a median income of $60,429 versus $36,999 for females. The per capita income for the city was $56,515. About 1.3% of families and 2.5% of the population were below the poverty line, including 1.7% of those under age 18 and 2.8% of those age 65 or over. Of the city's population over the age of 25, 50.1% hold a bachelor's degree or higher, while 81.3% spoke English, 1.62% Arabic, 1.5% Spanish, 1.3% Greek, and 0.7% German and Chinese.

=== 2020 census ===
As of the 2020 census, Westlake had a population of 34,228. The median age was 47.4 years. 18.1% of residents were under the age of 18 and 25.4% of residents were 65 years of age or older. For every 100 females there were 92.0 males, and for every 100 females age 18 and over there were 89.5 males age 18 and over.

100.0% of residents lived in urban areas, while 0.0% lived in rural areas.

There were 14,618 households in Westlake, of which 22.8% had children under the age of 18 living in them. Of all households, 49.4% were married-couple households, 18.4% were households with a male householder and no spouse or partner present, and 27.5% were households with a female householder and no spouse or partner present. About 35.3% of all households were made up of individuals and 16.3% had someone living alone who was 65 years of age or older.

There were 15,508 housing units, of which 5.7% were vacant. The homeowner vacancy rate was 0.8% and the rental vacancy rate was 8.5%.

Racial composition as of the 2020 census
Race	Number	Percent
White	29,358	85.8%
Black or African American	794	2.3%
American Indian and Alaska Native	23	0.1%
Asian	1,968	5.7%
Native Hawaiian and Other Pacific Islander	11	0.0%
Some other race	412	1.2%
Two or more races	1,662	4.9%
Hispanic or Latino (of any race)	1,157	3.4%

=== 2010 census ===
As of the census of 2010, there were 32,729 people, 13,870 households, and 8,443 families living in the city. The population density was 2,054.6 inhabitants per square mile (793.3/km^{2}). There were 14,843 housing units at an average density of 931.8 per square mile (359.8/km^{2}). The racial makeup of the city was 91.2% White, 1.6% African American, 0.1% Native American, 4.9% Asian, 0.1% Pacific Islander, 0.6% from other races, and 1.6% from two or more races. Hispanic or Latino people of any race were 2.5% of the population.

There were 13,870 households, of which 26.2% had children under the age of 18 living with them, 51.4% were married couples living together, 6.9% had a female householder with no husband present, 2.5% had a male householder with no wife present, and 39.1% were non-families. Of all households 34.2% were made up of individuals, and 13.2% had someone living alone who was 65 years of age or older. The average household size was 2.30 and the average family size was 3.01.

The median age in the city was 45 years. Of the residents 21.5% were under the age of 18; 5.7% were between the ages of 18 and 24; 22.8% were from 25 to 44; 31% were from 45 to 64; and 19% were 65 years of age or older. The gender makeup of the city was 47.4% male and 52.6% female.

=== 2000 census ===
As of the census of 2000, there were 31,760 people, 12,830 households, and 8,186 families living in the city. The population density was 1,995.2 inhabitants per square mile (770.4/km^{2}). There were 13,648 housing units at an average density of 858.5 per square mile (331.5/km^{2}). The racial makeup of the city was 91.65% White, 0.95% African American, 1.36% Native American, 4.21% Asian, 0.01% Pacific Islander, 0.33% from other races, and 1.51% from two or more races. Hispanic or Latino people of any race were 1.27% of the population.

There were 12,826 households, out of which 28.5% had children under the age of 18 living with them, 55.9% were married couples living together, 5.8% had a female householder with no husband present, and 36.1% were non-families. Of all households 32.0% were made up of individuals, and 12.7% had someone living alone who was 65 years of age or older. The average household size was 2.37 and the average family size was 3.06.

In the city, the population was spread out, with 22.8% under the age of 18, 5.6% from 18 to 24, 26.8% from 25 to 44, 26.6% from 45 to 54, and 18.2% who were 55 years of age or older. The median age was 42 years. For every 100 females, there were 89.4 males. For every 100 females age 18 and over, there were 85.3 males.

== Economy ==
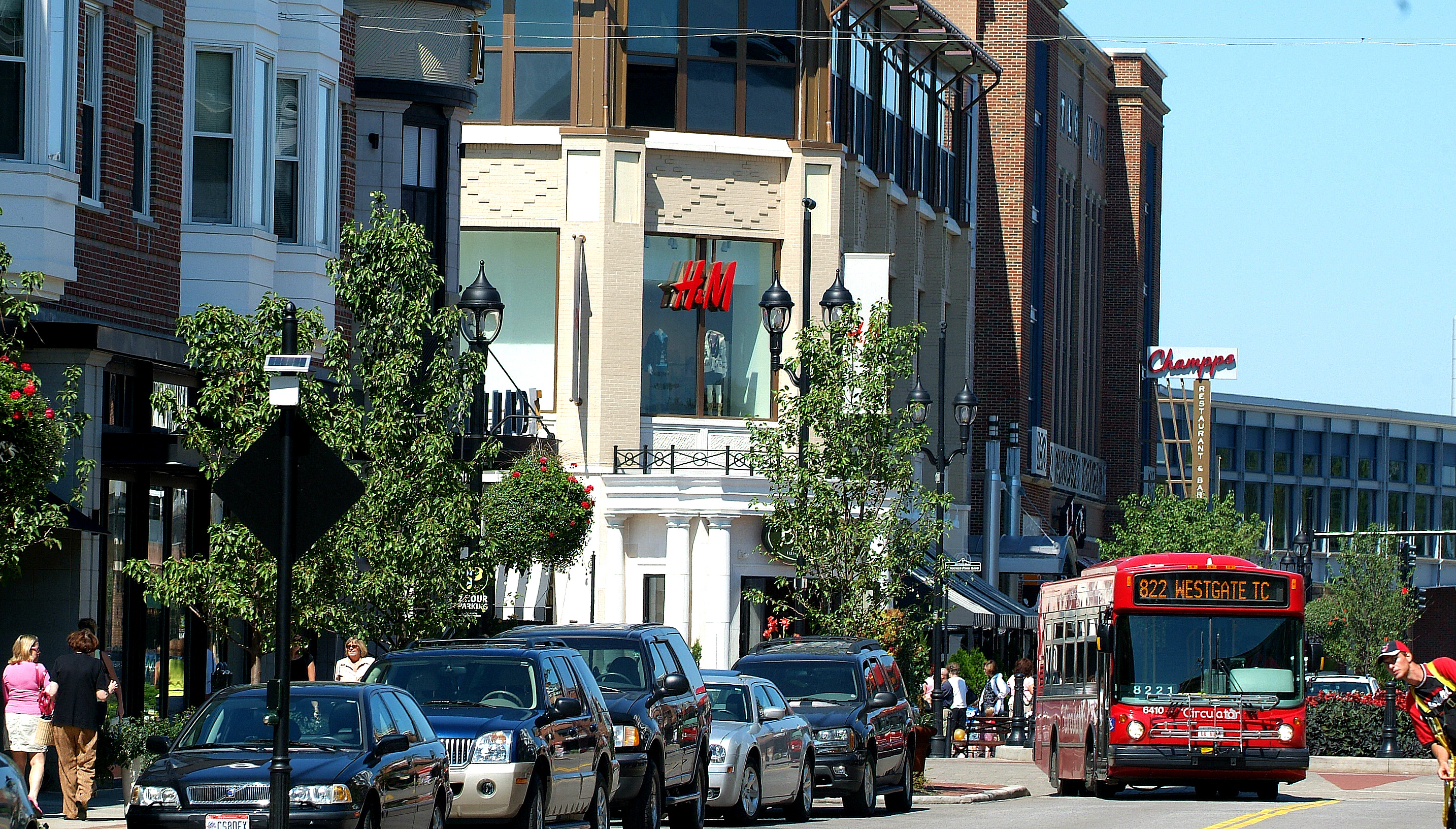
Crocker Park in 2006

Companies headquartered in Westlake include Nordson, American Greetings, Hyland Software, and Scott Fetzer Company, TravelCenters of America, and Equity Trust.

Crocker Park is a lifestyle center and mixed-use development compromising 1,050,000 sq ft (98,000 m^{2}) of retail space, 650 residential units, and 100,000 sq ft (9,300 m^{2}) of office space based on a small French town-type setting.

=== Top employers ===
According to the city's 2021 Comprehensive Annual Financial Report, the top employers in the city are:

#	Employer	# of employees
1	University Hospitals Health System	3,202
2	Hyland Software, Incorporated	1,987
3	American Greetings Corporation	1,167
4	TA Operating, LLC	835
5	Westlake City School District	707
6	City of Westlake	413
7	Equity Administrative Services	412
8	The Cleveland Clinic Foundation	395
9	Budget Dumpster, LLC	333
10	KeyBank National Association	199

== Arts and culture ==
Westlake is served by the Westlake Porter Public Library.

Also found in Westlake is Lakewood Country Club, "the only Northern Ohio Club to host the PGA-based, Web.com televised golf tour."

Clague House Museum showcases the history of Westlake (formerly Dover). This house was built in 1876.

Clague Playhouse is a community theatre producing five plays a season from the classic and contemporary repertoire.

The White Oaks Restaurant was a lucrative speakeasy during the Prohibition era. Dover Gardens Tavern was also a speakeasy with an upstairs ballroom during Prohibition.

== Education ==
The Westlake City School District consistently places within the top 4% of statewide districts on the state education report card. The district received an achievement grade of 89.0% for the Performance Index and a grade of 95.% for the Indicators Met on the Ohio Department of Education's 2013–2014 District Report Card.

The district mission statement is "We Educate for Excellence."

- Westlake Elementary School (grades K–4)
- Dover Intermediate School (grades 5–6)
- Lee Burneson Middle School (grades 7–8)
- Westlake High School (grades 9–12)

Westlake High School is home to WHBS-TV, the Westlake High school Broadcasting System. WHBS-TV is seen on channels 99 and 18 on AT&T U-Verse and WOW! cable, respectively, in the Westlake area.

== Notable people ==
- Travis Kelce, NFL Tight End, Kansas City Chiefs
- Bernie Moreno, U.S. Senator from Ohio
- Jake Paul, YouTuber and boxer
- Logan Paul, YouTuber, actor, former professional boxer, and WWE wrestler
- Brian K. Vaughan, comics and television writer

== Sister cities ==
Westlake's first sister city partnership with the Town of Tralee in Ireland was founded in 2009 and is recognized by Sister Cities International. In 2012 Westlake also became sister city to the Canadian town of Kingsville, Ontario.

- (Republic of Ireland) Tralee, County Kerry, Ireland
- Kingsville, Ontario, Canada
