= Mike's Place =

Israeli chain of bars

Mike's Place (מייקס פלייס)
- Industry: Bar
- Founded: Israel (1992; 34 years ago)
- Headquarters: Tel Aviv, Israel
- Number of locations: 3
- Area served: Israel
- Products: Hamburgers, chicken, french fries
- Website: www.mikesplacebars.com/

Mike's Place (Hebrew: מייקס פלייס) is an Israeli chain of bars, with three bars around the country.

== History ==
In 1992 Michael Vigodda, a photojournalist, opened Mike's Place in downtown Jerusalem. Vigodda named the bar after another bar called "Mike's Place" located at the Carleton University Students' Center in Ottawa, Ontario, Canada. This was, in turn, named after former Canadian Prime Minister and statesman Lester B. "Mike" Pearson, who won the 1957 Nobel Peace Prize for his role in defusing the Suez Crisis.

In 1995, Assaf Ganzman, an Israeli blues musician and vocalist for a band called SOBO, became an owner of the bar after Vigodda returned to Canada.

== Locations ==
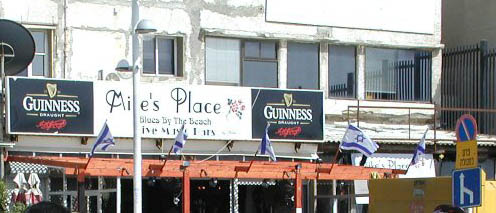
Mike's Place on the beachfront promenade in Tel Aviv

In 1999, the bar moved to Jerusalem's Russian Compound and in 2005 to Jaffa Road. In 2001, a second branch was opened in Tel Aviv, next to the American Embassy on the Tel Aviv beachfront. The Jerusalem branch closed on 4 January 2009, when the 19th-century building in which it was housed was demolished. In October 2010, Mike's Place re-opened in Jerusalem at a new location also on Jaffa Road. The Jerusalem branch, the first Mike's Place franchise, is owned and operated by Jerusalem architect Reuben Beiser.

As of 2020, there are three branches of Mike's Place:

- Tel Aviv, promenade
- Jerusalem
- Eilat

== Kashrut ==
The Jerusalem location is kosher. The other locations are in primarily secular areas of Israel where Jews do not typically keep the laws of Shabbat. Therefore, if the locations were to be kosher they must close on Friday nights, a very popular night for bars in secular areas.

== Suicide bombing ==
On 30 April 2003, a Palestinian suicide bombing perpetrated by British Muslims killed three civilians and wounded 50 others at Mike's Place in Tel Aviv.

== See also ==
- Culture of Israel
- Israeli cuisine
- Economy of Israel
- List of restaurants in Israel
